= 1944 in Iran =

- Decades: 1920s; 1930s; 1940s; 1950s; 1960s
- See also: Other events of 1944; Years in Iran

The following lists events that happened during 1944 in Pahlavi Iran.

== Incumbents ==
- Shah: Mohammad Reza Pahlavi
- Prime Minister: Ali Soheili (until April 6), Mohammad Sa'ed (April 6 – November 25), Morteza-Qoli Bayat (starting November 25)

== Events ==
- 1943–44 Iranian legislative election.

== Births ==
- January 20 – Farhad Mehrad, Iranian singer and guitarist.
- January 20 – Nasser Aghaei, Iranian boxer.
- January 22 – Khosrow Golsorkhi, Iranian journalist, poet, and communist activist.
- February 2 – Mehrab Shahrokhi, Footballer.
- February 4 – Manouchehr Vossough, Iranian film producer and actor.
- February 29 – Saeed Poursamimi, Iranian actor.
- March 4 – Mohammad Nasehi, Iranian weightlifter.
- March 6 – Abbas Anvari, Iranian physicist.
- March 21 – Jafar Kashani, Iranian footballer.
- March 23 – Jamshid Hashempour, Iranian actor.
- March 24 – Levon Davidian, Iranian politician.
- March 25 – Hossein Jafarian, Iranian cinematographer.
- March 26 – Moslem Eskandar-Filabi, Iranian wrestler.
- March 27 – Khosrow Shakibai, Iranian actor.
- March 27 – Nouri Khodayari, Iraqi footballer Iranian footballer.
- April 10 – Ramezan Kheder, Iranian amateur wrestler.
- April 13 – Cleopatra Broumand, Iranian-born American fashion designer.
- April 16 – Davoud Akhlaghi, Iranian cyclist.
- April 21 – Guity Novin, Canadian artist.
- April 28 – Mohammad Mehdi Behkish, Iranian academic.
- May 30 – Fadhil al-Milani, religious leader and scholar.
- June 13 – Ali Sayad Shirazi, Iranian general.
- June 28 – Sohrab Shahid-Saless, filmmaker.
- July 6 – Hossein Ziai, Muslim philosopher.
- July 14 – Lili Golestan, Iranian translator and gallerist.
- July 27 – Dariush Arjmand, Iranian actor.
- August 19 – Ali Hatami, Iranian film director.
- September 1 – Ahmad Alamolhoda, Iranian cleric leader.
- September 1 – Farhang Holakouee, Iranian economist, psychologist and writer.
- September 7 – Houshang Moradi Kermani, Iranian author and novelist.
- September 8 – Dariush Mostafavi, Iranian footballer.
- September 11 – Morteza Aghili, Iranian film director and actor.
- September 15 – Akbar Behkalam, painter and sculptor.
- September 15 – Jamal Bakhshpour, Iranian painter.
- September 28 – Mohammad-Hossein Malekzadegan, Iranian military officer.
- September 29 – Hassan Abbaspour, Iranian politician.
- October 6 – Ali Akbar Nategh-Nuri, Iranian cleric.
- October 11 – Younan Nowzaradan, doctor famous for operating on morbidly obese patients.
- October 19 – Mohammad-Ali Taskhiri, Iranian ayatollah.
- October 26 – Saeed Rad, Iranian actor.

== Deaths ==
- July 25 – Reza Shah, Shah of Iran from 1925 to 1941 and founder of the Pahlavi Dynasty.
- December 10 – Haji-Mirza Hassan Roshdieh, Iranian cleric and educator.
- ? – Aqa Najafi Quchani, Shia Muslim scholar of 14th century AH.
- ? – Hassan Esfandiari, Iranian politician.
- ? – Mirza Rida Quli Shari'at-Sanglaji, Iranian akhoond and theologian.
- ? – Nari (poet), poet.
- ? – Soleiman Eskandari, Iranian Qajar prince, historian and socialist politician.
- ? – Ahmad Ahmadi, executioner.
