= 1945 in Iran =

- Decades: 1920s; 1930s; 1940s; 1950s; 1960s
- See also: Other events of 1945; Years in Iran

The following lists events that happened during 1945 in Pahlavi Iran.

== Incumbents ==
- Shah: Mohammad Reza Pahlavi
- Prime Minister: Morteza-Qoli Bayat (until May 13), Ebrahim Hakimi (May 13 – June 6), Mohsen Sadr (June 6 – October 30), Ebrahim Hakimi (starting October 30)

== Births ==
- January 4 – Sima Bina, Iranian musician, researcher, singer, painter.
- January 6 – Haik Hovsepian Mehr, Iranian bishop.
- January 11 – Karo Haghverdian, footballer.
- January 19 – Fariborz Raisdana, Iranian civil rights activist.
- January 20 – Mansour Pourheidari, Iranian footballer and coach.
- January 21 – Behzad Farahani, Iranian actor.
- January 23 – Hossein Kalani, Iranian footballer.
- February 5 – Ramzi Garmou, Iranian Catholic priest.
- March 2 – Parvaneh Massoumi, Iranian actress.
- March 3 – Haydar Hatemi, Iranian artist.
- March 15 – Shahriar Shafiq, Iranian royal.
- March 17 – Homeyra, Iranian singer.
- March 18 – Hadi Mirmiran, Iranian architect.
- March 21 – Mojtaba Mirzadeh, Iranian violinist.
- March 25 – Massoud Azarnoush, Iranian archaeologist.
- March 27 – Enayatollah Bakhshi, Iranian actor.
- April 4 – Atash Taqipour, Iranian actor.
- April 10 – Aboutaleb Talebi, Olympic wrestler.
- April 15 – Hamid Ahmadi (historian), Iranian historian.
- May 4 – Gholam-Ali Haddad-Adel, Iranian politician and former chairman of the Parliament.
- May 9 – Manucher Ghorbanifar, Iranian arms trader.
- May 30 – Nasser Mohammadifar, Iranian military officer.
- June 11 – Siavash Ghomayshi, Iranian singer-songwriter and musician.
- June 24 – Ali Akbar Velayati, Iranian politician and physician.
- July 7 – Bijan Elahi, Iranian poet and translator.
- July 9 – Akbar Alemi, Iranian photographer, cinematographer and film director.
- July 11 – Gholamhossein Farzami, Iranian association football player.
- July 13 – Faramarz Aslani, Iranian guitarist, songwriter and Persian folk/pop singer.
- August 18 – Juliet Geverkof, Iranian athletics competitor.
- August 21 – Bahaedin Adab, Iranian politician, engineer.
- September 16 – Nazli Bayat Makoo, Iranian athletics competitor.
- September 23 – Behrouz Rahbar, Iranian cyclist.
- September 25 – Evin Agassi, Singer.
- September 30 – Afshin Moghaddam, Iranian singer.
- October 1 – Mohammad Nassiri, Iranian weightlifter.
- October 18 – Abdollah Eskandari, Iranian make-up artist.
- October 23 – Ali Fallahian, Iranian cleric.
- October 31 – Zahra Rahnavard, Iranian academic and politician.
- November 15 – Amir Mahmud Anvar, Iranian academic and poet.
- November 25 – Seyed Ali Asghar Dastgheib, Iranian cleric.

== Deaths ==
- January 30 – Louise Aslanian, WWII French-Armenian resistance activist.
- February 15 – Arpiar Aslanian, Armenian lawyer and resistance fighter.
- October 1 – Gahraman Mirza Salur, Iranian historian.
- ? – Hossein Pirnia, Iranian politician.
