= 1948 in Iran =

- Decades: 1920s; 1930s; 1940s; 1950s; 1960s
- See also: Other events of 1948; Years in Iran

The following lists events that happened during 1948 in Pahlavi Iran.

== Incumbents ==
- Shah: Mohammad Reza Pahlavi
- Prime Minister: Ebrahim Hakimi (until June 13), Abdolhossein Hazhir (June 13 – November 9), Mohammad Sa'ed (starting November 9)

== Events ==
- Insurgency in Balochistan.
- Iran at the 1948 Summer Olympics.

== Births ==
- January 3 – Kamran Qadakchian, Iranian film director.
- January 5 – Khosro Haghgosha, cyclist.
- January 8 – Reza Mansouri, Iranian physicist.
- January 14 – Nasrollah Mardani, Iranian poet.
- February 2 – Aziz Espandar, Iranian footballer.
- February 7 – Majid Halvaei, Iranian association football player.
- February 24 – Bahiyyih Nakhjavani, Iranian writer, author of the novel The Saddlebag.
- February 25 – Parvaneh Etemadi, Iranian painter.
- March 7 – Majid Jahanpour, Iranian association football player.
- March 11 – Shahram Shabpareh, Iranian pop singer and former actor.
- March 21 – Ayoub Bodaghi, Iranian athletics competitor.
- March 22 – Mohammad Reza Khalatbari (footballer, born 1948), association football player.
- March 25 – Mehdi Asgarkhani, Iranian footballer.
- April 4 – Hossein Kazerani, Iranian footballer.
- April 4 – Jila Mossaed, Iranian-Swedish author.
- April 10 – Abdolhamid Fathi, Iranian fencer.
- May 18 – Mohsen Nourbakhsh, Iranian politician.
- May 19 – Ali Nobakht, professor.
- May 22 – Sarkis Assadourian (fencer), Iranian fencer.
- May 31 – Kambiz Yeganegi.
- June 12 – Sadegh Zibakalam, Iranian academician.
- June 16 – Mansour Sattari, Iranian military man.
- July 13 – Rasoul Montajabnia, Iranian politician.
- July 14 – Marjan (singer), Iranian singer and actress.
- July 27 – Mohsen Safaei Farahani, Iranian politician.
- August 7 – Firouzeh Vokhshouri, Jordanian princess.
- August 7 – Sadreddin Hejazi, Iranian actor.
- August 15 – Mahmoud Hashemi Shahroudi, Iranian Ayatollah.
- August 18 – Massoud Rajavi, Iranian political activist.
- August 20 – Yahya Rahmat-Samii, American engineer.
- September 24 – Mahmoud Khordbin, Iranian footballer.
- October 11 – Mehrdad Abedi, Electric machinery researcher.
- October 18 – Hassan Arianfard, cyclist.
- October 27 – Faramarz Assef, Iranian singer.
- November 12 – Hassan Rouhani, President of Iran from 2013 to 2021.
- November 23 – Morteza Alviri, Iranian politician.
- December 1 – Mohammad Reza Navaei, Iranian amateur wrestler.
- December 8 – Habib Fatahi, Iranian amateur wrestler.
- December 10 – Masoud Jafari Jozani, Iranian filmmaker.
- December 20 – Azar Nafisi, Iranian-American writer.

== Deaths ==
- March 4 – Fatemeh Sayyah, Iranian essayist.
- December 31 – Ghaffar Djalal, Iranian diplomat.
- ? – Mohammad-Hosayn Ayrom, Iranian general.
- ? – Muhammad Amin al-Imami al-Khu'i, Iranian Islamic jurist and writer.
