= 1942 in Iran =

- Decades: 1920s; 1930s; 1940s; 1950s; 1960s
- See also: Other events of 1942; Years in Iran

The following lists events that happened during 1942 in Pahlavi Iran.

== Incumbents ==
- Shah: Mohammad Reza Pahlavi
- Prime Minister: Mohammad Ali Foroughi (until March 9), Ali Soheili (March 9 – August 9), Ahmad Qavam (starting August 9)

== Births ==
- January 4 – Ebrahim Ashtiani, Iranian footballer.
- January 23 – Bahman Farmanara, Iranian film director.
- February 16 – Djamchid Chemirani, Iranian musician and composer.
- February 20 – Arby Ovanessian, Iranian film director, writer and playwright.
- March 15 – The Iron Sheik, Iranian-American professional wrestler and actor.
- March 23 – Jalal Talebi, Iranian football player and manager.
- March 27 – Firouz Abdolmohammadian, Iranian water polo player.
- April 2 – Esmaeil Hosseini, Iranian cyclist.
- April 8 – Sonia Balassanian, Iranian-born Armenian artist, poet.
- April 10 – Hayedeh, Iranian singer.
- April 21 – Mohammad Mokhtari (writer), Iranian writer.
- April 23 – Kazem Sadegh-Zadeh, German academic of Iranian descent.
- April 24 – Shahla Lahiji, Iranian writer.
- April 26 – Mahbanoo Tata, Ph.D. Purdue University 1967; 1942-2023.
- May 24 – Esfandiar Zarnegar, Iranian fencer.
- May 29 – Kambiz Derambakhsh, Iranian designer.
- June 1 – Faramarz Zelli, Iranian footballer.
- June 5 – Abbas Duzduzani, Iranian politician.
- June 6 – Mahmoud Kashani, Iranian politician, academic, writer and lawyer.
- June 9 – Amir Taheri, Iranian author.
- June 11 – Fereydoon Shahbazyan, Iranian composer.
- June 18 – Jamshid Momtaz, Iranian legal scholar.
- June 20 – Homayoun Behzadi, Iranian footballer.
- July 11 – Mehdi Fakhimzadeh, Iranian actor, screenwriter, film producer and film director.
- July 27 – Hossein Erfani, Iranian Voice Actor and Actor.
- August 15 – Bahman Mofid, Iranian actor.
- August 23 – Torab Haghshenas, Iranian revolutionary activist, writer and translator.
- August 24 – Abdollah Saedi, Iranian association football player.
- August 25 – Abd-al-Hussain Borunsi, Iranian military personnel.
- August 29 – Mohammad Hashemi Rafsanjani, Iranian politician.
- September 4 – Alireza Shapour Shahbazi, Iranian archaeologist.
- October 9 – Ali Mirzaei (footballer), Iranian association football player.
- October 23 – Kazem Rahimi, Iranian footballer.
- November 11 – Ali Babachahi, Iranian poet and writer.
- November 17 – Homa Katouzian, Iranian economist, writer and researcher.
- December 22 – Asadollah Badamchian, Iranian politician.
- December 22 – Asghar Sharafi, Iranian footballer and coach.
- December 26 – Reza Naji, Iranian actor.
- December 27 – Hossein Zakeri, Iranian mathematician.
- ? – Abd al-Rahim Aqiqi Bakhshayishi, Iranian religious writer.

== Deaths ==
- April 29 – Naser Divan Kazeruni, Iranian politician.
- August 29 – Hassan Ali Nokhodaki Isfahani, Iranian mystic.
- November 27 – Mohammad Ali Foroughi, Iranian writer and politician.
- December 20 – Nezam Al Olama Estahbanati, Islamic jurist and scholar.
- December 29 – Vahid Dasgardi, Iranian poet, literary and journalist.
- ? – Agha Zia ol Din Araghi, 19th-century Persian Shia jurist.
- ? – Gulamrza Sharifzade, Azerbaijani actor, publisher, engineer, director of the Azerbaijan State Theater.
- ? – Muhammad Hossein Gharavi, Iraqi-Iranian faqih and poet.
