= 1943 in Iran =

- Decades: 1920s; 1930s; 1940s; 1950s; 1960s
- See also: Other events of 1943; Years in Iran

The following lists events that happened during 1943 in Pahlavi Iran.

== Incumbents ==
- Shah: Mohammad Reza Pahlavi
- Prime Minister: Ahmad Qavam (until February 15), Ali Soheili (starting February 15)

== Births ==
- January 2 – Ziya Movahed, Iranian writer.
- February 1 – Büyük Vatankhah, Iranian footballer and manager.
- February 4 – Shamseddin Seyed-Abbasi, Olympic wrestler.
- March 12 – Mina Assadi, Iranian-born poet, author, journalist and songwriter.
- March 19 – Alireza Hajghasem, association football player.
- March 19 – Karam Nirlou, Iranian footballer.
- March 22 – Katayun Mazdapour, Iranian linguist.
- March 22 – Nazem Ganjapour, Iranian footballer.
- March 22 – Rahim Aliabadi, wrestler.
- March 25 – Hassan Tavanayanfard, Iranian economist.
- April 2 – Zhaleh Kazemi, Iranian voice actress.
- April 24 – Mohammad Ghorbani (wrestler), Olympic wrestler.
- May 18 – Ebadollah S. Mahmoodian, Iranian mathematician.
- May 23 – Kevin Boyle (lawyer), Northern Irish civil rights activist, barrister and educator.
- May 31 – Valiollah Momeni, Iranian Actor.
- June 16 – Hossein Ghafourizadeh, Iranian sprinter.
- July 5 – Farshid Mesghali, Iranian animator and children's illustrator.
- July 19 – Nasrollah Pourjavady, Iranian philosopher, translator and essayist.
- July 22 – Hadi Khorsandi, Iranian writer.
- July 28 – Ebrahim Javadi, Olympic wrestler.
- August 5 – Hassan Ghafourifard, Iranian politician.
- August 6 – Ali Asghar Mohtaj, painter.
- August 14 – Abdolali Bazargan, Iranian politician.
- September 2 – Ateghe Sediqi, Iranian politician.
- September 25 – George Bournoutian, Iranian-American professor and historian.
- October 14 – Mohammad Khatami, President of Iran from 1997 to 2005.
- October 28 – Ali Akbar Saremi, architect.
- November 17 – Amir Hassanpour, Iranian scholar.
- November 22 – Hassan Shamaizadeh, Iranian musician.
- November 27 – Reza Allamehzadeh, Persian filmmaker.
- November 27 – Reza Mafi, Iranian calligrapher.
- December 7 – Akbar Eftekhari, Iranian footballer.
- December 18 – Mohammad Reza Aslani, Iranian writer, poet, film director and screenwriter.
- December 22 – Amin Faghiri, Iranian playwright.
- ? – Ahmad Kamyabi Mask, writer and educator from Iran.
- ? – Ali Akbar Entezami, Iranian writer.
- ? – Ali Mohammad Ranjbar, Indian academic.
- ? – Azam Taleghani, Iranian journalist.
- ? – Farideh Mostafavi Khomeini, Iranian religious scholar.
- ? – Gholamreza Aavani, Iranian Philosopher.

== Deaths ==
- January 7 – Mohammad Hassan Mirza, Qajar prince.
- ? – Soleiman Eskandari, Iranian Qajar prince, historian and socialist politician.
