= French branch of the Armenian Relief Committee =

Communist, pro-Soviet organization

- Founded: 1925
- Founders: Kourken Tahmazian
- Dissolved: 1937
- Location: France, Paris
- Subsidiaries: Hog, Zangou

The French branch of the Armenian Relief Committee (Armenian: Hay(astali) Oknoutian Gomidé, HOG) was established in 1925 to foster closer ties between the Armenian diaspora in France and Soviet Armenia, while also providing support to Armenian communists in France. From its inception in 1925 until its dissolution in 1937, the organization played a pivotal role in shaping the Armenian labor movement in France. It aligned itself with the French Communist Party (PCF) and played a role in publishing and supporting numerous periodicals. It also conducted training programs for activists, notably Missak Manouchian, and claimed up to 3,500 members across France.

== History ==
=== Origins and foundation ===
In 1921, the Relief Committee for Armenia (HOG, for Hay Oknoutian Gomidé) was established in Yerevan, Soviet Armenia. The HOG replaced the HOM (Hay Oknoutian Marmin, or Commission for Aid to Armenia), an organization established by the First Republic of Armenia to obtain material aid. The HOG is an international organization with a communist orientation that seeks to obtain material aid and, more generally, to forge links between the Armenian diaspora and Armenia.

The French branch of the HOG was formally established in 1925, shortly after the recognition of the USSR by France at the end of 1924. The date of its official inception is 29 May. Nevertheless, the decision to establish itself in France preceded this recognition, as evidenced by the organization's statutes, which cite its creation in April 1924. Indeed, the organization had already commenced operations in 1924. The responsibility of establishing this organization was assigned to Kourken Tahmazian (1890-1936; and potentially also Haïg Kaldjian), an Armenian communist who had previously been a member of the Social Democrat Hunchakian Party.

The statutes of the French branch of the HOG set forth the following objectives: to facilitate the reconstruction and contribute to the economic recovery of Armenia, to establish mutually beneficial relations, to disseminate information about Soviet Armenia among Armenians in the diaspora, to encourage their repatriation (in accordance with the principle of nationalities), and so forth. The organization claims to "pursue no political aim", which is demonstrably false. It functions as a conduit for Moscow's propaganda and as an instrument to counter the influence of the Armenian Revolutionary Federation (ARF, also known as the Dashnak party), a prominent force within the Armenian diaspora.

=== The HOG and the PCF, two linked organizations ===
In 1924, the PCF established language groups to oversee the activities of foreign workers, including a group of Armenian workers. This group subsequently became the Armenian subsection of the PCF in 1926.

Kourken Tahmazian played a pivotal role in the consolidation of the Parisian wing of the Hentchak party within the PCF. He spearheaded the formation of this new subsection, which was composed of militants who were among the first members of the PCF.

Kourken Tahmazian was appointed General Secretary of the French Branch of the HOG from 1925 to 1931. He continued to play a pivotal role in the organization's direction until his death in March 1936. Additionally, he was the primary figure within the Armenian section of the PCF, thereby exerting control over the two pivotal points of the Armenian communist and pro-Soviet movements in France. The members of this Armenian subsection of the PCF, which grew from 450 in 1927 to less than a hundred after the anti-communist repression of the Poincaré government, were also often closely associated with the HOG. As observed by Astrig Atamian, "the majority of the members of the Armenian subsection joined the PCF through their involvement with the HOG and their dedication to Soviet Armenia."

The PCF was aware of the HOG's indispensable role within the Armenian left, as evidenced by the existence of a HOG Commission within the Armenian subsection of the PCF. While the PCF and the HOG were intertwined in many respects, the former sought to rally Armenian communists to French social struggles, while the latter sought to dissuade them and instead direct them towards the Soviet horizon.

=== In the 1920s ===
The HOG established itself in France when Armenians had only recently begun to arrive in the country. In 1925, while they were mainly in Marseille, their militant activity was relatively limited. However, this situation evolved rapidly as they found themselves increasingly unemployed. The HOG capitalized on this situation, which was further exacerbated by administrative measures limiting their employment prospects in 1928.

Additionally, the founder, Kourken Tahmazian, assumed an editorial role, overseeing the publication of successive editions that served as the official organ of the HOG in France. The French Branch of the HOG provided partial funding for the publication of works by Armenian communists, including Hay Panvor (1924), Panvor-Parizi (1924-1925), Verelk (1926-1927), Erevan (1925-1930), and Mer Oughine (1931-1932). Upon his arrival, Eghia Tchoubar, an agent dispatched from Yerevan, initiated the publication of Verelk, which served as the organ of the Central Executive Committee of the Armenian Workers' Cells of the PCF, based in the offices of L'Humanité. This publication was subsequently succeeded by Panvor (1928-1929). At the beginning of 1931, Kourken Tahmazian undertook a four-month trip to Armenia, during which he obtained the financial resources to launch a new periodical, Mer Oughine, intended to replace Erevan. The writers were gradually recruited locally in France, among orphans of the genocide who had turned to communism through their experience in factories and unemployment, which had a particularly adverse effect on foreigners in the aftermath of the 1929 crisis.

As is the case with a significant proportion of the Armenian left in France, the HOG commemorates 29 November each year, marking the Sovietization of Armenia following its invasion by the Red Army. In contrast, the remainder of the community, primarily organized by the Armenian Revolutionary Federation, commemorates the independence of the First Republic of Armenia on 28 May. The competition between the two organizations is intense. For example, Der Bagdassarian, a member of the French Section of the HOG, was killed on 2 May 1926 in Lyon. He had come to disrupt a lecture given by Avetis Aharonian and was killed by a knife blow from a member of the ARF (or possibly by a gunshot). In June, Archbishop Krikor Balakian issued a condemnation of the event, calling for calm and unity among Armenians.

Additionally, the French police monitored Armenian communists, resulting in the expulsion of five individuals from the country in February 1925. The French authorities were concerned about the growth of this communist movement, which, in February 1927, boasted of having gathered 1,500 people for a meeting in Marseille in support of unemployed Armenians. The surveillance of Armenian communists was also motivated by a desire to prevent clashes between anti- and pro-Soviet factions, as well as between different factions of the Armenian communist movement. In the city of Marseille, for instance, the French branch of the HOG was rivaled by another association led by Haïk Serengulian, a militant of the PSU, which had 600 members.

A number of early Armenian communists relocated to Soviet Armenia in the 1920s with the assistance of the HOG, driven by a conviction in the ideology, but also compelled by economic necessity or the threat of police repression.

=== In the 1930s, under Haïg Kaldjian ===
In 1933, Dr. Haïg Kaldjian was appointed to the position of Secretary General. In the mid-1930s, a new generation of Armenian communists and intellectuals began to gather around him. From 1933 onward, and during the Popular Front, the HOG and the PCF attracted numerous Armenians from France. Consequently, at the time of Haïg Kaldjian's appointment, the HOG had established 16 sections within the Paris region. Additionally, it had 52 sections and 2,000 members throughout France. By the end of the three years, the number of sections had increased to 68, with a total membership of 3,500. This growth can be attributed to some factors, including the rise of fascism in Europe (as evidenced by the crisis of 6 February 1934, in France), which prompted the Comintern to abandon the "class against class" tactic at its Seventh Congress (summer 1935). Additionally, the USSR's opening to the outside world, the rise of the PCF, and the advent of the Popular Front also contributed to this growth.

In February 1933, the organization inaugurated the publication of a magazine, entitled Hog, which was designated as the official organ of the organization.

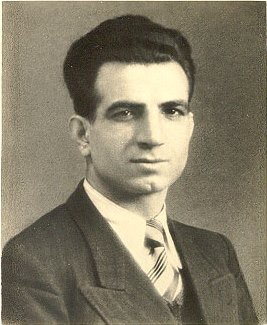
Missak Manouchian.

The rivalry between the two groups continued into the 1930s. For example, some Armenian communists characterized the members of the ARF as fascists. On 26 February 1933 communists disrupted an ARF meeting in Grenoble with shouts of "Long live Communist Armenia!" The ensuing brawl resulted in the death of a man. In Valence, the town hall refused to rent rooms to Armenians for certain festivities due to the frequent brawls.

At the conclusion of each year, the HOG held a gala. It was at the 1934 gala that Mélinée Manouchian, then responsible for the financial affairs of the organization, first encountered Missak Manouchian. He joined the organization that same year, accompanied by the PCF.

In July 1935, the HOG Congress was convened to elect its Central Council, with each section represented by a delegate. One of the Congress's primary objectives was facilitating the election of numerous young individuals and women to the Central Committee. Missak and Mélinée were selected as delegates by their respective sections and, as a result, were in attendance at the Congress. They were subsequently elected to the Central Committee and, thereafter, encountered each other daily within the organization's offices. Additionally, Missak Manouchian was chosen to assume the newly established role of Second Secretary and appointed as the editor of the newspaper Zangou.

In 1935, the French branch of the HOG was banned by the French authorities, who expressed concerns about its progress. However, this ban was largely theoretical, and the HOG continued to exist until its parent organization was dissolved in 1937 or even 1938.

The HOG played a pivotal role in the repatriation of numerous Armenian refugees in France to Armenia during the 1920s and 1930s. This was particularly the case on 9 May 1936, when 1,734 Armenians (or perhaps 1,800 families according to Le Petit Provençal, or 3,000 people), most of whom were communists and members of the HOG, were repatriated. Some Armenians then sought to join the HOG and the PCF to participate in this repatriation.

The repatriation of numerous Armenian communists, often the most ardent supporters, resulted in a significant reduction in the French branch of the HOG. Furthermore, these individuals soon became disillusioned and cautioned their relatives who remained in France, urging them to refrain from joining them. The Great Stalinist Purges, which reached their zenith in the Moscow Trials, contributed to the HOG's waning appeal and rapid decline in France.

From 1936 onward, the decline of the HOG permitted the PCF to partially regain control over Armenian communists in France. These individuals were increasingly integrated into French society, and their communist commitment was increasingly directed through the PCF rather than the HOG.

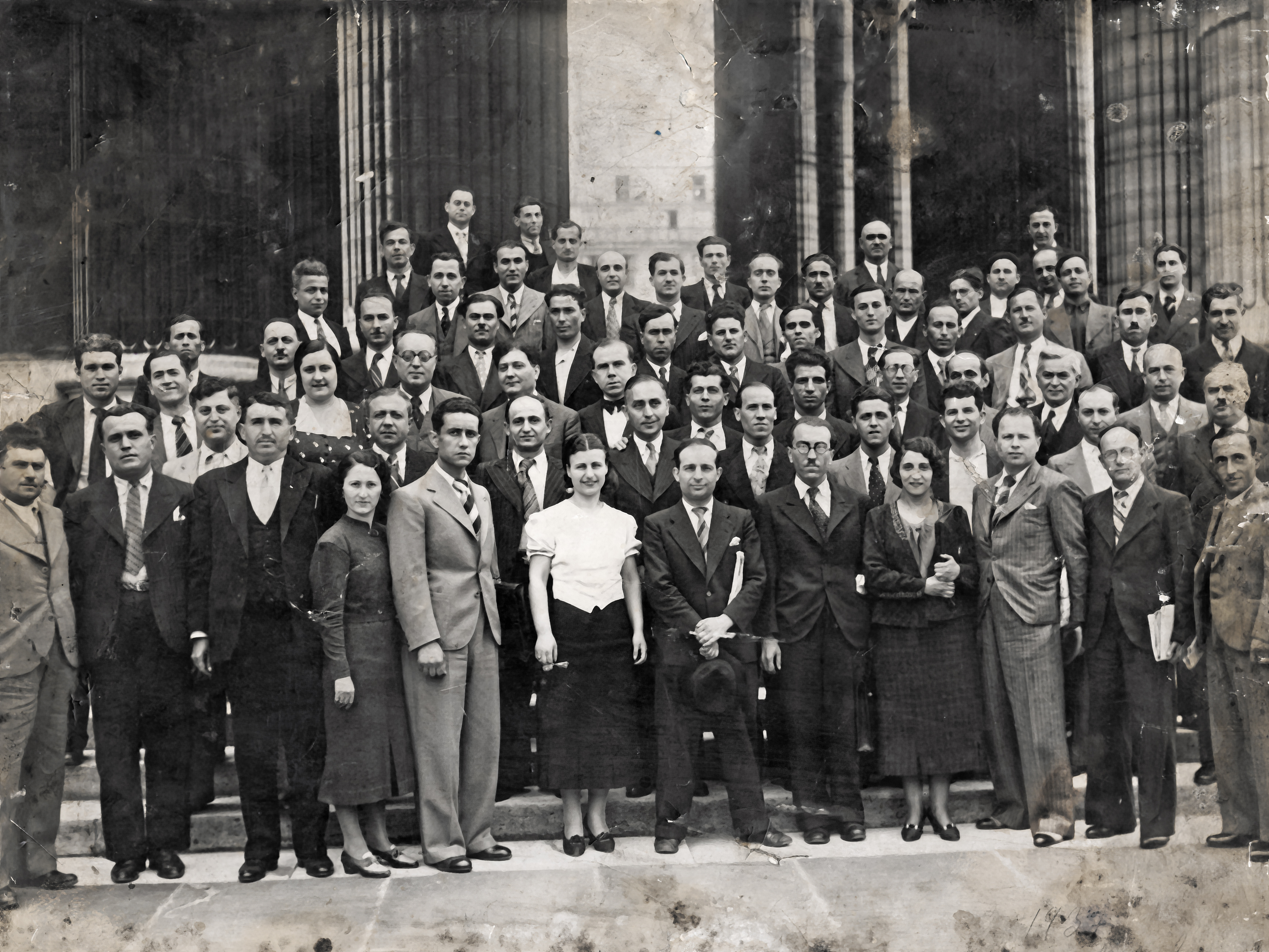
Members of the 6th HOG Congress on 25 June 1937 in front of the Panthéon. They included Mélinée Manouchian, Louisa Aslanian, Missak Manouchian and Mihran Mazlemian.

=== Dissolution and the Union Populaire Franco-Arménienne (1937-1939) ===
Following the dissolution of the HOG in 1937, its French members were left disoriented and also faced financial difficulties. In response, they created a new structure in 1938: the Union Populaire Franco-Arménienne (or simply Union Populaire Arménienne, Hay Joghovourtagan Mioutioun), based on rue Saulnier. Its leaders were Haïg Kaldjian and Missak Manouchian.

Subsequently, Missak Manouchian undertook a tour of Armenian communities in France intending to promote the newly established organization. Following a meeting in Décines with the young Henri Karayan, the latter proceeded to join the Union. In his own words, Karayan asserted that "Manouchian's organization was dedicated to the emancipation and cultural advancement of the Armenian people."

The organization's leaders were apprehended at the onset of hostilities in early September 1939, preceding the dissolution of the organization on 26 September (simultaneous with the PCF and all its affiliated entities).

Despite the police sealing the organization's headquarters, Mélinée Manouchian was able to gain access with the assistance of Louise and Arpiar Aslanian. Her objective was to retrieve compromising documents, including membership lists, and destroy them before they could be seized.

== Organization ==
The HOG's headquarters were situated in Paris on rue Bourdaloue. The organization was characterized by a high degree of centralization, led by a Secretary General and a Central Committee, and composed of local Committees, with a minimum of 10 members, except for Marseille and Paris.

In the capital, the HOG comprised numerous sections (16 in 1933). For example, Missak Manouchian was a member of the Latin Quarter committee, mainly composed of intellectuals, while Mélinée Assadourian was active in the Belleville committee, which was largely made up of workers.

In the Rhône-Alpes region, for instance, a local committee was established in Valence as early as 1925. This committee was led by Mirhan Dersarkissian, a former member of the Hentchak party. By the end of 1932, the HOG's membership in the region was estimated to be approximately 300 individuals. This figure was distributed across several localities, including 45 members in the department of Vienne, 18 in Pont-de-Chéruy, 94 in Décines, 52 in Grenoble, 20 in Villard-Bonnot, and 42 in Valence.

== Related figures ==
- Kourken Tahmazian: founder, Secretary General (1925-1931).
- Haïg Kaldjian: Secretary General (1933-1937).
- Missak Manouchian: a member of the Latin Quarter Committee (1934), member of the Central Council (1935), and Second Secretary (1935-1937).
- Mélinée Manouchian: member in the early 1930s after graduating from the Tebrotzassère school, member of the Belleville committee, member of the Central Council (1935).
- Guiragos Karayan, father of Henri Karayan: Secretary of the Décines section.
- Louise Aslanian
- Arpiar Aslanian
- Diran Vosguiritchian

== Related journals ==
- Hay Panvor (1924)
- Verelk (1926-1927)
- Erevan (1925-1930)
- Tzolk (1928)
- Mer Oughine (1931-1932)
- Hog (1933-1935)
- Zangou (1935-1937)
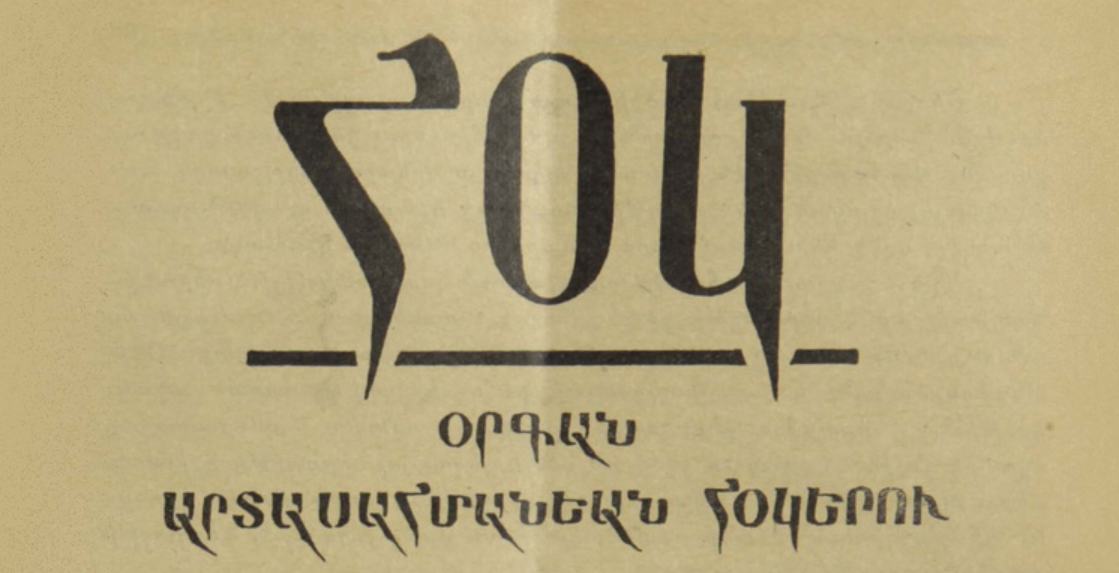
Hog cuff.

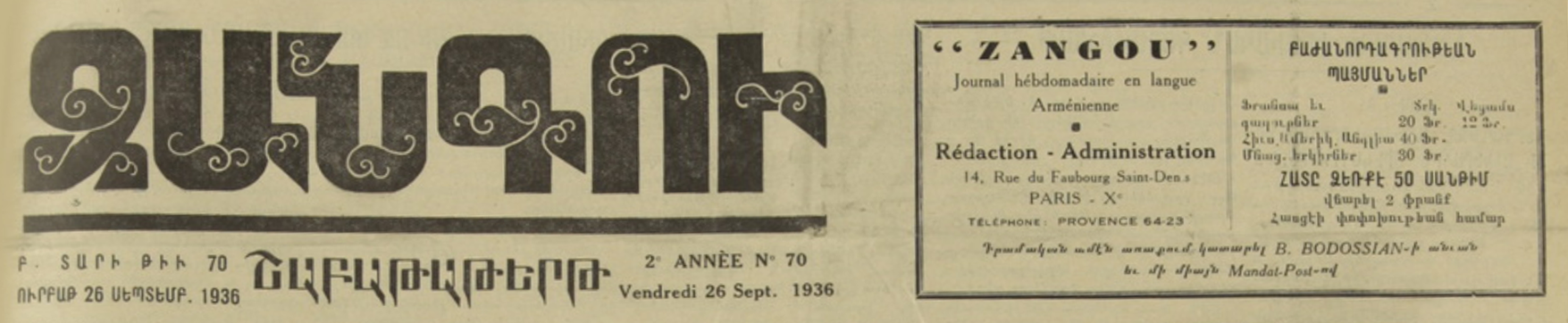
Zangou cuff.

== Bibliography ==
- Manouchian, Mélinée (1974). Manouchian (in French). Paris: Les Éditeurs français réunis. OCLC 1167648.
- Ter Minassian, Anahide (1997). Histoires croisées : Diaspora, Arménie, Transcaucasie, 1880-1990 (in French). Parenthèses. ISBN 978-2863640760. Archived from the original on 17 March 2023.
- Beledian, Krikor (2001). Cinquante ans de littérature arménienne en France : Du même à l'autre (in French). CNRS Éditions. ISBN 978-2-271-05929-1.
- Le Tallec, Cyril (2001). La communauté arménienne de France, 1920-1950 (in French). L'Harmattan. ISBN 978-2-7475-0480-5. Archived from the original on 31 July 2024.
- Atamian, Astrig (2007). "Les Arméniens communistes en France, une histoire oubliée" (PDF). Amnis, Revue de civilisation contemporaine (in French) (7 « Histoire de l'immigration, traces et mémoires »). doi:10.4000/amnis.853.
- Huard, Jean-Luc (2007). "La présence arménienne dans l'entre-deux-guerres dans la région Rhône-Alpes". Hommes et Migrations (in French). 1265 (1265 « Diaspora arménienne et territorialités »): 34–52. doi:10.3406/homig.2007.4565. Archived from the original on 16 August 2024.
- Mouradian, Claire; Kunth, Anouche (2010). Les Arméniens en France, du chaos à la reconnaissance. Exils (in French). Paris: Éditions de l'attribut. ISBN 978-2-916-00218-7.
- Lewis, Mary D (2010). "V « Asile ou exclusion ? »". Les frontières de la République : Immigration et limites de l'universalisme en France (1918-1940). Contre-feux (in French). Agone. pp. 213–267. ISBN 978-2748901276. Archived from the original on 29 November 1998.
- Atamian, Astrig (2013). "Des Arméniens dans les Brigades internationales". Études arméniennes contemporaines (in French) (2): 7–25. doi:10.4000/eac.216. Archived from the original on 15 April 2024.
- Atamian, Astrig (2014). La mouvance communiste arménienne en France : entre adhésion au PCF et contemplation de l'Ararat : Les "rouges" de la communauté arménienne de France, des années 1920 aux années 1990 (PhD thesis) (in French). Paris: INALCO.
- Atamian, Astrig; Mouradian, Claire; Peschanski, Denis (2023). Manouchian : Missak et Mélinée Manouchian, deux orphelins du génocide des Arméniens engagés dans la Résistance française (in French). Éditions Textuel. ISBN 978-2-84597-961-1.
- Manessis, Dimitri; Vigreux, Jean (2024). Avec tous tes frères étrangers : De la MOE aux FTP-MOI (in French). Libertalia. ISBN 978-2377293193.
