= 1858 in Iran =

- Decades
- See also: Other events of 1858; Years in Iran

The following lists events that happened during 1858 in Qajar era.

== Incumbents ==
- Monarch: Naser al-Din Shah Qajar

== Births ==
- January 6 – Mirza Ali Asghar Khan Amin al-Soltan, Prime Minister of Iran.
- ? – Bibi Khanoom Astarabadi, Iranian writer, satirist, and one of the pioneering figures in the women's movement of Iran..

== Deaths ==
- ? – Fakhr Jahan Khanum, daughter of Fath ‘Ali Shah and calligrapher.
