= 1885 in Iran =

- Decades
- See also: Other events of 1885; Years in Iran

The following lists events that happened during 1885 in Qajar era.

== Incumbents ==
- Monarch: Naser al-Din Shah Qajar

== Births ==
- May 22 – Akbar Mass'oud, Persian prince.
- October 17 – Mahmud Khan Puladeen, Iranian general.
- ? – Abbas Adham, Iranian physician and politician.
- ? – Ahmad Ahmadi, executioner.
- ? – Ali-Akbar Davar, Iranian politician.
- ? – Gholam Hossein Tabrizi, Islamic cleric.
- ? – Jabbar Baghtcheban, Iranian educator and inventor, founder of the first Iranian kindergarten and school for the deaf..
- ? – Muhammad Amin al-Imami al-Khu'i, Iranian Islamic jurist and writer.
- ? – Taqi Rafat, Iranian poet.

== Deaths ==
- ? – Nader Mirza Qajar, Qajar writer.
