= 1859 in Iran =

- Decades
- See also: Other events of 1859; Years in Iran

The following lists events that happened during 1859 in Qajar era.

== Incumbents ==
- Monarch: Naser al-Din Shah Qajar

== Births ==
- December 17 – Haj Aqa Nourollah, Iranian grand ayatollah.
- ? – Abdolkarim Haeri Yazdi, Iranian Grand Ayatollah.
- ? – Mohammad-Ebrahim Khan Ghaffari, Iranian politician.
