= Mohammad Mehdi Behkish =

Iranian academic

- Born: 28 May 1944
- Education: (PhD) Indiana University in Bloomington, Indiana, USA (MA) University of Western Ontario in Canada (BA) University of Tehran
- Awards: Knight of the Order of the Star of Italian Solidarity (cavaliere) (2009)
- Scientific career
- Fields: Economic Development and Econometrics, Economics of Globalization, Iranian Economic Issues

Mohammad Mehdi Behkish (Persian: محمد مهدی بهکیش; born 28 May 1944) is an Iranian economist and retired Associate professor at the Allameh Tabatabaei University of Tehran. He served as president of the Iran-Italy Chamber of Commerce for more than 21 years (1992-2013), and is currently president of the Presidency Council.

He has been the executive director (Secretary General) of the Iranian National Committee of ICC (International Chamber of Commerce) in Iran since 1985.

== Early life and education ==
Behkish was born in Mashhad, Iran, where he attended high school. He earned his B.A. in Economics in Tehran University (1967), his M.A. in Economics in University of Western Ontario in Canada (1971), and his Ph.D. in Econometrics & Economic Development in Indiana University in Bloomington, Indiana, United States (1977).

Upon returning to Iran in 1978, he joined Abureyhan University, which was later integrated with various other universities and institutions to establish Alameh Tabatabaei University after the Islamic Revolution.

== Career ==
Behkish's career was formed in an environment in which his business experiences complemented his academic work in the university. He began his various positions in different Chamber in Iran with a consultative position, before being raised sharply to higher positions such as Secretary General of Iran Chamber of Commerce, Vice Chairman & S.G. of ICC in Iran, and President of Iran-Italy Chamber (for which he received Knight of the Order of the Star of Italian Solidarity (cavaliere) from the President of State of Italy in 2009).

Behkish is among a few economists whose advice is well considered in both the Private Sector and Public Sector. He strongly believes in market economy, and has pushed strongly for joining Iran to WTO before it became almost impossible. He has tried continuously to push the government to liberalize the economy, using his seat in the University or his official positions in chambers.

Due to Behkish's work with the ICC (International Chamber of Commerce) for more than 25 years, he is well aware of the benefits of globalization, and hence, in addition to writing his books on such related subjects, he kept a window open in the country to connect interested businessman to international business communities.

== Publications ==
=== Books ===
Behkish has published four books, with the latest being "Iranian Economy in the Context of Globalization" in Persian, which used IMD (International Institute for Management Development) as a model for measuring competitiveness of an economy.

His other books are primarily applications of economic liberalization, conducted with the cooperation of two other colleagues from his work with the Ministry of Mines & Metals.

=== Articles ===
Behkish is also a columnist in a variety of economic newspapers & magazines. His list of published contains more than 250 articles & 150 interviews.
