= Hossein Zakeri =

Iranian mathematician (born 1942)

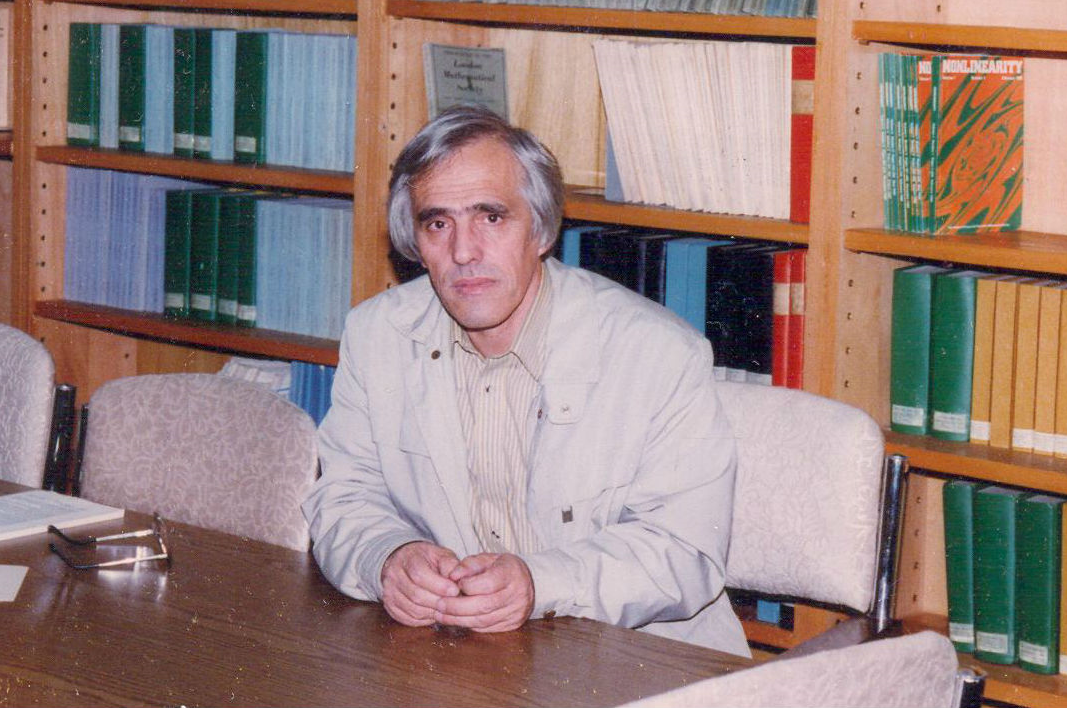
Zakeri

Hossein Zakeri (Persian حسین ذاکری) (born 27 December 1942) is an Iranian mathematician. Along with R. Y. Sharp, he is a cofounder of generalized fractions, a branch in theory of commutative algebra which expands the concept of fractions in commutative rings by introducing the modules of generalized fractions. This topic later found applications in local cohomology, in the monomial conjecture, and other branches of commutative algebra.

== Biography ==
Zakeri was born in Urmia, the capital of West Azerbaijan Province. He was accepted in Sharif University of Technology as a top student and studied Electrical Engineering there for a few months. But he then resigned due to family's financial status. He worked as a schoolteacher for 3 years before choosing mathematics as his major and he completed his B.S. in University of Tabriz (1968 to 1972). He then studied his M.Sc. in the Institute of Mathematics of Kharazmi University in Teheran, directed at the time by Prof. Gholamhossein Mosaheb (1972 to 1974). He then did another M.Sc. (1979 to 1980), and a Ph.D. degree (1980 to 1982) under supervision of Prof. R. Y. Sharp in University of Sheffield, England. His thesis title was "Modules of Generalized Fractions and Their Applications in Commutative Algebra" which is the first published paper on the topic.

Zakeri is currently retired and works part-time. He was married to Parivash Tousheh in 1974. They have a daughter and a son.

== Academic career ==
Zakeri was the head of department of mathematics of Tarbiat Modares University (1988 to 1990), head of the Institute of Mathematics of Kharazmi University (1991 to 1994), head of mathematics section of Institute for Research in Fundamental Sciences (1994 to 1996), and head of the commutative algebra research team in that institute (1994 to 1999).

Zakeri has been named the father of commutative algebra of Iran in 2012, for his efforts and contributions in Commutative Algebra to Iranian mathematical community. The 10th seminar of "Commutative Algebra and Related Topics" of Institute for Research in Fundamental Sciences (December 2013), and the 24th Iranian Algebra Seminar (November 2014), were held in honor of him and as appreciation of his work.

Zakeri has supervised 81 M.Sc. students, and 22 Ph.D. students until now. He has 34 published papers, most of which related to Generalized Fractions. In general there are more than 120 published articles (by him or others) citing Generalized Fractions in their content.

== Awards ==
- First Grade Graduate Medal (1972), department of mathematics, Tabriz University.
- ATM Flett prize in pure mathematics for doctoral thesis, University of Sheffield, England (1982).
- Abbas Riazi Kermani prize (1999).
- Award for the outstanding visiting professor of Tarbiat Modares University (1999–2000).

== Selected publications ==
Papers

- R. Y. Sharp, H. Zakeri (June 1982). "Modules of generalized fractions". Mathematika. 29 (1): 32–41. doi:10.1112/s0025579300012134.
- R. Y. Sharp, H. Zakeri (December 1982). "Local cohomology and modules of generalized fractions". Mathematika. 29 (2): 296–306. doi:10.1112/s0025579300012389.
- J. Tang, H. Zakeri (1994). "Co-Cohen-Macaulay modules and modules of generalized fractions". Communications in Algebra. 22 (6): 2173–2204. doi:10.1080/00927879408824960.
- Zakeri, Hossein (1994). "An Application of modules of generalized fractions to grades of ideals and Gorenstein rings". Colloquium Mathematicum. 67 (2): 281–288. doi:10.4064/cm-67-2-281-288.

Books

- Linear Algebra, Mohammad Javad Emami, Hossein Zakeri, Adineh Mohammad Narenjani (1988).

Translations

- Algebra, Thomas W. Hungerford. Translated by Aliakbar Alemzadeh, Hossein Zakeri, (1996). ISBN 964-5624-13-4
