= Nouri Khodayari =

Iraqi-Iranian footballer

Personal information
- Full name: Nouri Qahraman Khodayari
- Date of birth: March 27, 1944
- Place of birth: Baghdad, Kingdom of Iraq
- Date of death: March 6, 2013 (aged 68)
- Place of death: Ahvaz
- Position: Midfielder

Senior career*
Years	Team	Apps	(Gls)
1970–1972	Pas Ahvaz		
1973–1974	Navard Ahvaz		
1974–1977	Niroo Ahvaz		
1977–1978	F.C. Aboumoslem		

International career
1973	Iran U20		
- * Club domestic league appearances and goals

Nouri Khodayari (Arabic: نوري خضيري, Persian: نوری خداياری) was a Iraq–Iranian football player.

He was born in Baghdad and played for Al-Omma and Aliyat Al-Shurta (only one match scoring four goals). He was known in Iraq as Nouri Qaraman. He was a Fayli Kurd and because he did not possess a certificate of nationality he was unable to sign for Aliyat Al-Shurta (one of the best teams in Iraq in the 1960s and 1970s), which was why he left Iraq as he was unable to sign for any club. Khodayari died at dawn on March 6, 2013 in Ahvaz after a heart attack. He is survived by five children, two sons and three daughters.

== Playing career ==
=== Club career ===
Nouri moved to Iran in 1970, Ahvaz, the capital of Khuzestan province. He played for a number of clubs from Ahvaz and then spend a season with F.C. Aboumoslem.

=== National career ===
Nouri was a member of Iran national under-20 football team in 1973 AFC Youth Championship.

== Managerial career ==
Nouri has held various coaching positions (technical director, head coach, assistant coach) with Khuzestani club sides.
