= Manouchehr Vossough =

Iranian actor and film producer (1944–2022)

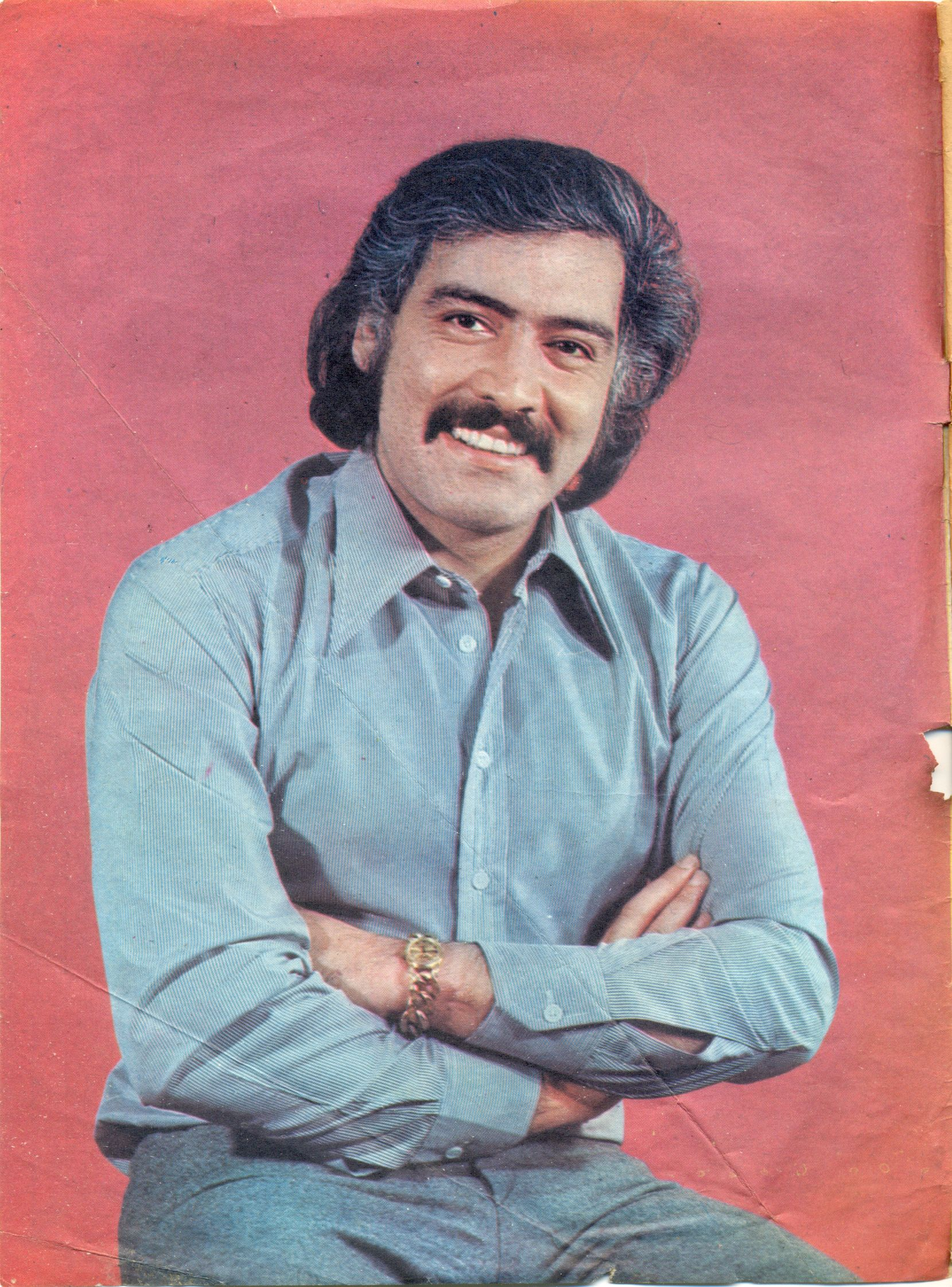
Vossough in 1974

Manouchehr Vossough (Persian: منوچهر وثوق, born Abbas Rezayi Vossough (عباس رضایی وثوق); 4 February 1944 – 27 February 2022) was an Iranian actor and film producer.

== Life and the beginning ==
the beginning Abbas Rezaee Wathouq was born on 4 February 1944 in Ray St., Tehranm Urab. He completed his education at Badr High School. He was interested in sports since he was a teenager and was active in athletics. At this time, Vathouq turned to acting in the theater together with Saeed Qaim Maqami and performed in the theater for organizations such as Peshahangi and Iran's Shir and Khursheed Red Sun Jamiat. With the formation of the "Kaveh Theater Group" by Saeed Qaim-maqami, Vathouq also started his cooperation with this group by performing in live theaters with Iran's national television.[3]

before the revolution

Vathouq's career in the cinema began in 1964 with the role in the movie Jahlha and Zhigulha. After that, he played his first leading role in the movie "Invisible Man" and became more famous after playing in the movie "Chark Begazi" directed by Mehdi Amirqasem Khani in 1968. In the beginning, he was compared to Mohammad Ali Fardin because of his appearance. But later he showed himself as an independent actor. He acted in more than 90 movies. He was one of the regular actors of the Parsfilm studio owned by Ismail Kushan.[2] In addition, in the same half of the 1960s, he played the lead role in the works of filmmakers such as Mehdi Jurek and Mehdi Raeesfirouz.

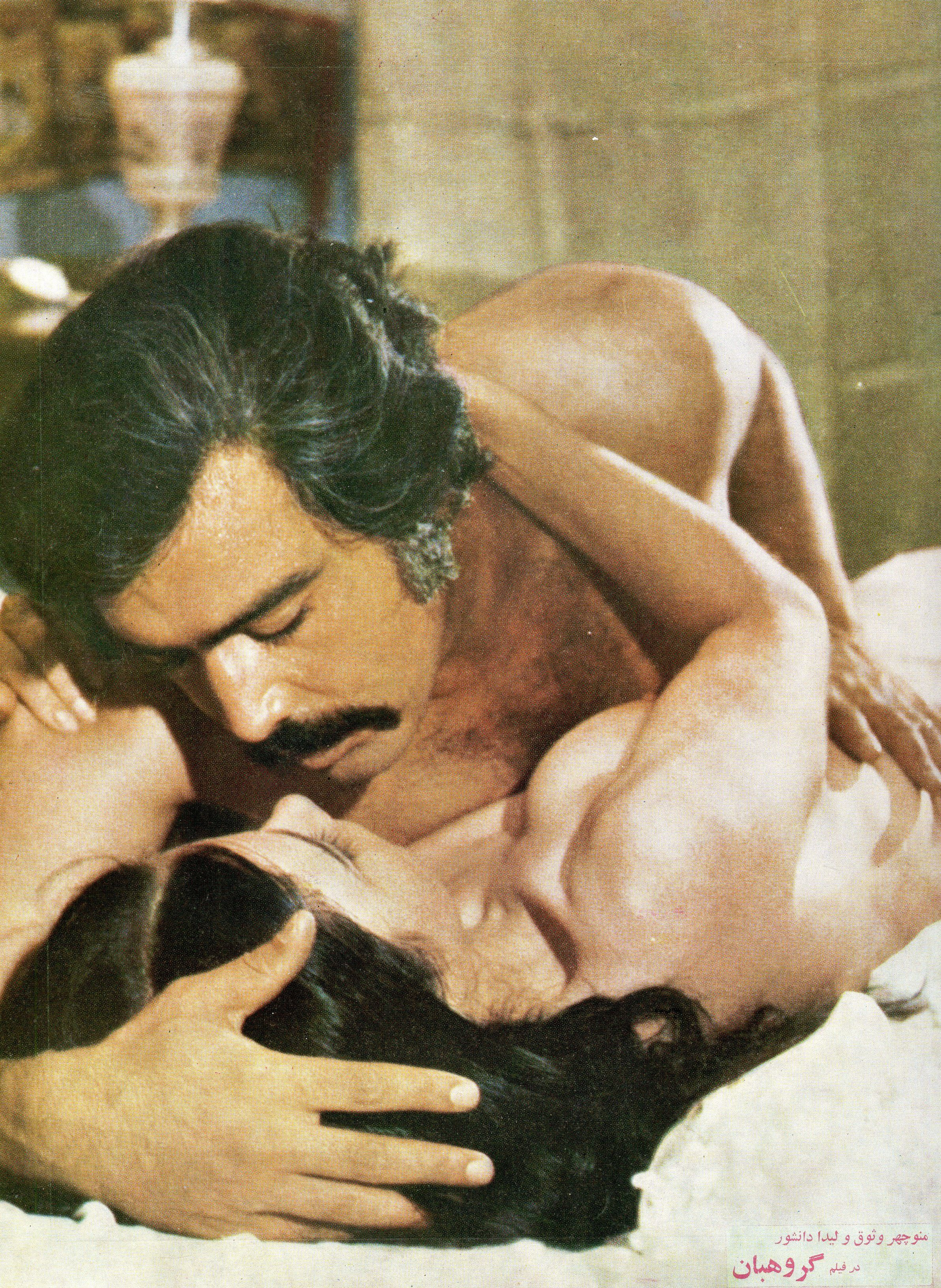
Bossough and Lida Daneshvar in the movie Sergeant (1972)

Until the end of the 1960s, Vathouq went in front of the camera in popular films alongside famous actors. [2] Haq and Nahaq, Zarakhrid and Zaghan Khanjar Rafiq were among the last films he starred in before the 1979 Islamic Revolution.

After the departure of Mohammad Reza Shah and before the victory of the 1979 revolution, Vathouq was outside Iran. He returned to Iran with calls from Iran. But after returning, he was banned from working in cinema. Therefore, he continued acting in Lalezar theaters. But for some time, along with some other artists, he was summoned to the Revolutionary Court of Evin Prison from interrogation and submission of a proposal after doing something according to Islamic standards. But he was never given the opportunity to continue his artistic activities.[3][2][4]

After living in Iran for five years and being unemployed, Vathouq secretly went to Pakistan and immigrated to England from there. In the first years of his arrival in London, he acted in the Akhundi variety show, produced by Reza Fazli and directed by Reza Sofa. The then Minister of Culture and Islamic Guidance knew about the actors before the revolution.[4] He collaborated with Me and To network. [3]

After suffering from cancer for several months, Wathouq died on 27 February 2022 at the age of 78 in London, and a few days later his body was cremated according to his will.

== Filmography ==
- 1980 Mosht-e mard as Ali
- 1979 Hokm-e tir
- 1973 The Kiss on Blood Lips as Shahbal
- 1973 Zan-e bākere as Borzū
- 1972 Lollipop as Rahbar
- 1971 Badnām as Mortezā
- 1971 Kākoū
- 1971 Khoshgeltarin zan-e 'ālam
- 1970 Bride of Bianca
- 1968 Charkh-e bāzigar
- 1968 The Daughter of the King of Fairies
- 1968 Pol-i be sū-ye behesht
- 1966 Hossein Kord Shabestari as Eskandar KhKn
