= Mehrdad Abedi =

Iranian electrical engineer

- Born: 11 October 1948 (age 77); Tehran, Iran
- Education: University of Tehran, Imperial College London , Newcastle University
- Scientific career
- Fields: electrical engineering and power engineering
- Workplaces: Amirkabir University of Technology

Mehrdad Abedi (مهرداد عابدی،; born 1948) is an electrical engineer and electric machinery researcher and professor of power engineering at Amirkabir University of Technology.

== Life and career ==
Abedi was born in 1948 in Tehran, Iran. He graduated from the University of Tehran with a degree in electrical engineering In 1970, he received an MS degree from Imperial College London in 1973 and a Ph.D from Newcastle University, both in electrical engineering with a speciality in electric machinery and power engineering.

After graduation, he worked at General Electric Company plc as a researcher for one year and then returned to Tehran and began his work at Amirkabir University of Technology as an instructor. He is principally known as the author of some textbooks for undergraduate electrical engineering students (in Persian).

Abedi is a member of the Iranian Academy of Sciences.

== Books written in Persian (until 2008) ==
- Basic of Electrical Machines (12th Edition), 2007
- Power System Analysis (3rd edition), 2006
- Modern Power System Analysis (4th edition), 2003 (books of the year)
- Distribution Systems, (2nd edition), 1990
- Electrical Machines with Power Electronic Applications, (7th edition 2008), (book of the year)
- Electrical Machines, Analysis, Operation and Control (15th edition), 2008
- Basic Circuit Analysis (7th edition), 2008
- Basic Control Systems, (2nd edition), 2002
- Electric Circuits (4 Volumes), 2008
- Electrical Machines (4 Volumes), (2nd Edition), 2008
- Basics of Electrical Machines, 2007
- Basics of Electrical Circuits, 2007

== Awards and honors ==
- Distinguished professor of Amirkabir University, 1994, Iran
- Distinguished researcher, ministry of energy, 1993, Iran
- Member of Iranian academy of science, Iran, 1991-now
- Distinguished author (book of the year), Tehran university, 1995, Iran
- Member of scientific committee of annual international conference in power systems, Iran, 1993-now
- Member of scientific committee of Iranian international conference in electrical engineering, 1993-now
- Member of editorial board of Amirkabir Journal of science and technology, Amirkabir university, Iran, 1987–2005
- Member of editorial board, Journal of Electricity, ministry of energy, Iran, 1993-now
- Distinguished professor and prize winner all over Iran selected by ministry of Higher Education 2001.
- Distinguished author (book of the year) selected by Iranian Energy Committee. 2001
- Prizewinner as innovator, selected by Iranian Elect. Eng. Society. 2003.
- Head of Electrical Engineering Section Iranian Academy of Science.2003-2006
- Appointed as Honorary Lecturer, University of Birmingham, U.K, 2007
