= Farhang Holakouee =

Iranian-American radio personality and sociologist

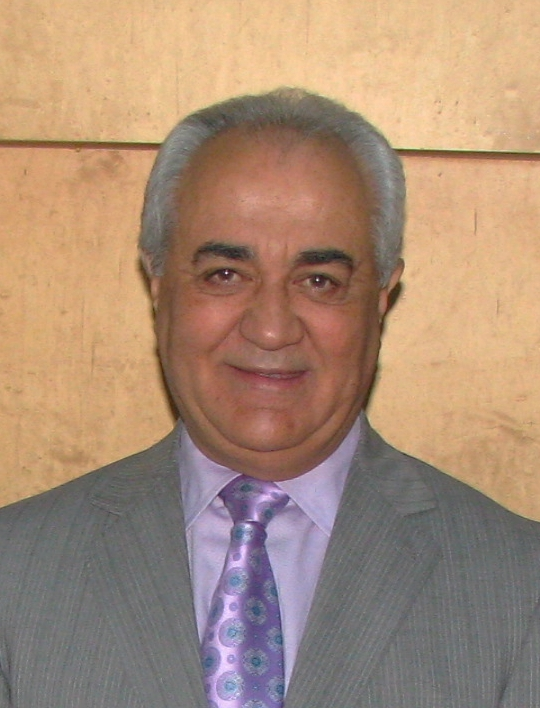
- Holakouee in 2009
- Born: Farhang Holakouee–Naeinee; August 31, 1944 (age 82); Shiraz, Iran
- Education: University of Utah (PhD)
- Children: 2
- Website: www.drholakouee.com

Farhang Holakouee–Naeinee (Persian: فرهنگ هُلاکویی نایینی; born 31 August 1944), simply known as Doctor Holakouee, is an Iranian-born American radio personality, sociologist, and economist. His radio program—hosted in the past by 670 KIRN, and currently by "Radio Hamrah"—offers relationship advice to callers in Persian. Holakouee was born in Shiraz, Iran, and currently resides in Los Angeles, California.

== Education ==
Holakouee has master's degrees in psychology, economics, and family counseling. He taught at the University of Tehran, before moving to the United States, where he completed a PhD in sociology at the University of Utah in 1974. During the Iranian revolution, he was dismissed from his position in University of Tehran for being member of the Bahá'í Faith.

== Works ==
Holakouee has written books and journal articles. Many of his lectures on family counseling and psychology are available on tape or online.

Although he doesn't have a Ph.D. in psychology, he often engages in telephone psychotherapy of patients via a live program where people refer to him as "Dr. Holakouee" when asking for psychological assessments and/or advice. Iranian listeners will call in to get advice on generational and cultural conflicts from far away places such as Sweden or Canada.
