= Arpiar Aslanian =

Armenian lawyer and resistance fighter

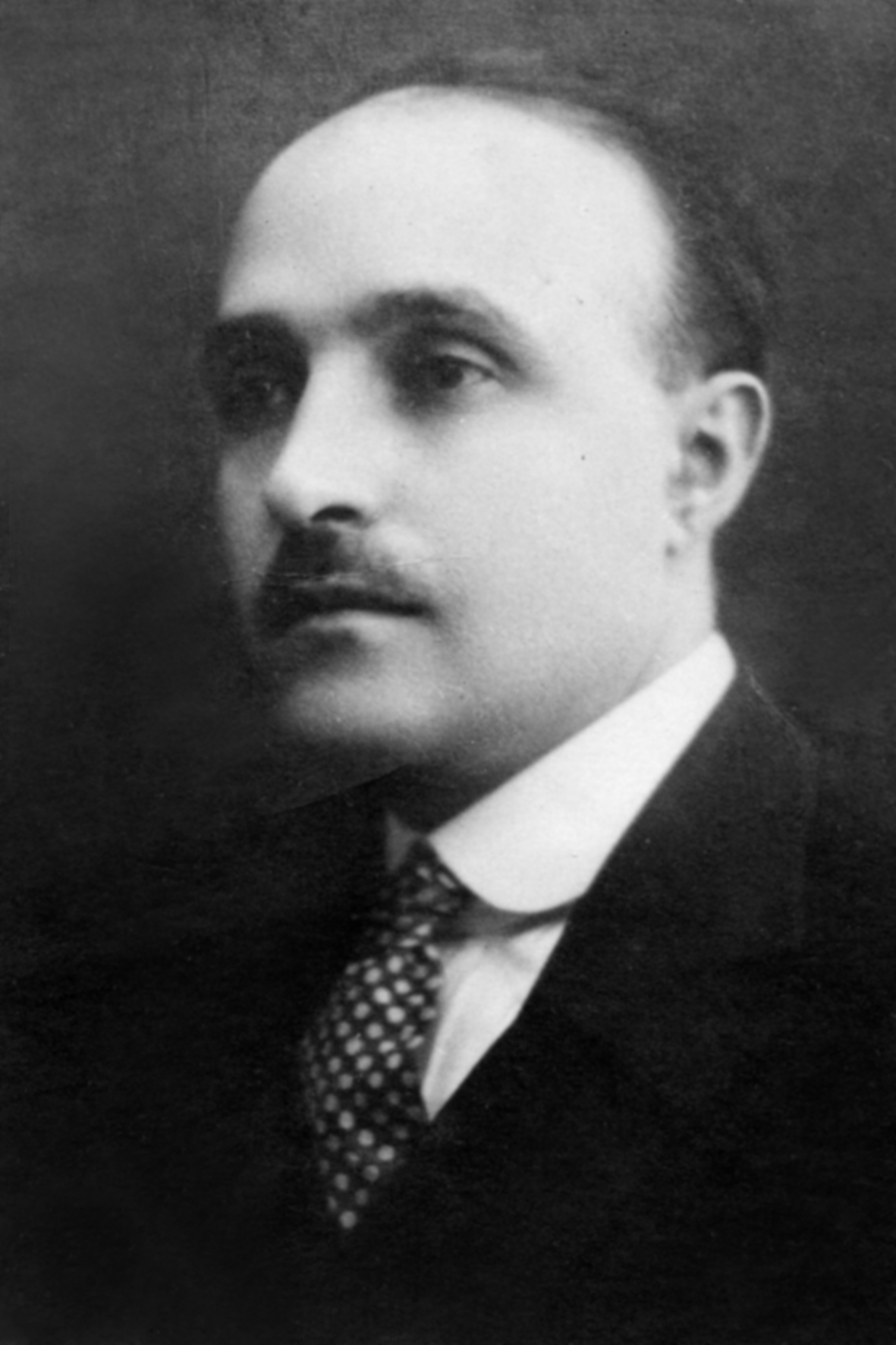
- Arpiar Aslanian, French-Armenian Resistance fighter
- Born: 16 December 1895; Etchmiadzin, Russian Armenia
- Died: 15 February 1945 (aged 49); Mittelbau-Dora concentration camp, Germany
- Other name: Արփիար Ասլանյան
- Occupations: political activist, French Resistance fighter
- Organization: FTP-MOI
- Political party: French Communist Party (from 1940)
- Movement: French Resistance, Anti-fascism
- Spouse: Louise Aslanian

Arpiar Aslanian (Armenian: Արփիար Ասլանյան; 16 December 1895 – 15 February 1945) was a French anti-fascist of Armenian descent, communist, husband of the writer Louise Aslanian, and a prominent figure in the French Resistance.

== Early life ==
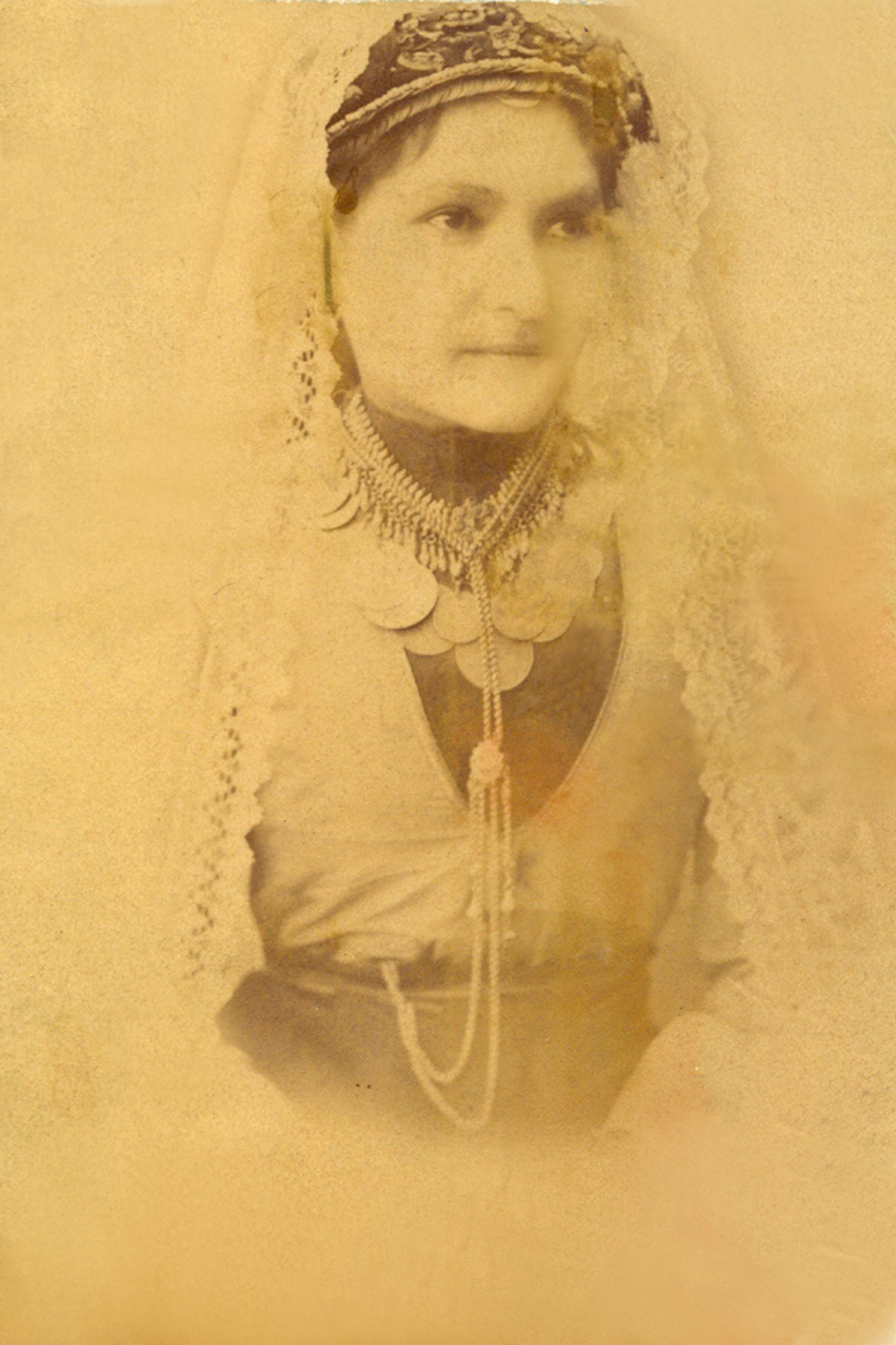
Varvara Aslanian, mother of Arpiar Aslanian

Arpiar Levonovich Aslanian was born on 16 December 1895 in Etchmiadzin (Russian Armenia) in the family of Levon and Varvara Aslanian. He had an older brother, Derenik, and a sister, Arpik. His father, Levon, was a principal in a school and also worked in the Etchmiadzin monastery, where he was in charge of the library collections.

Aslanian received a juridical education in Tsarist Russia and became a lawyer.

Aslanian was a member of the Dashnaktsutyun. He had to leave Armenia to avoid prosecution by Bolsheviks. Aslanian travelled to Tabriz, where in 1923 he married Louise Grigorian, more than ten years younger than him.

== Life in France ==
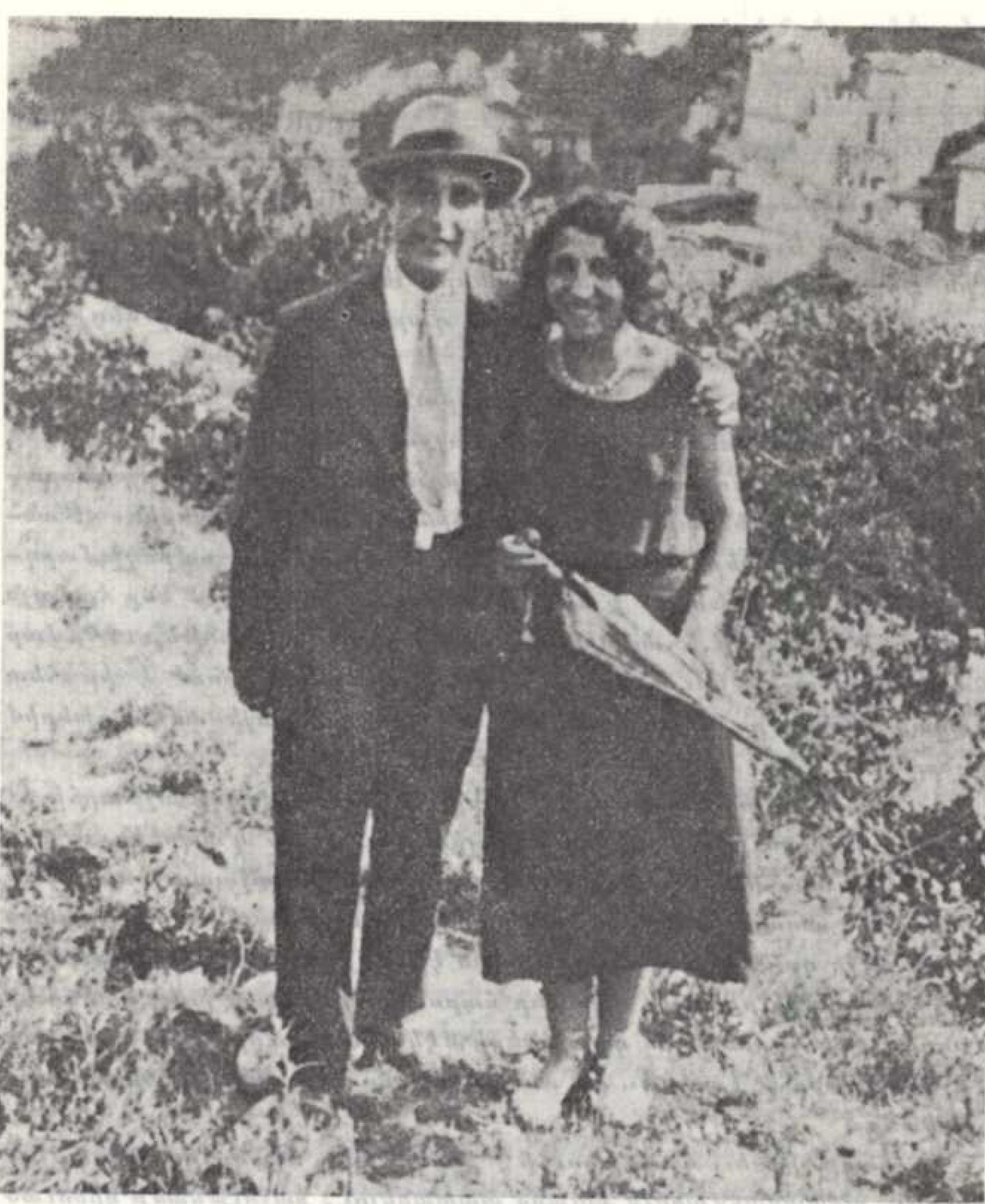
Louise and Arpiar Aslanians in France

In 1923, the couple moved to Paris, taking with them Mania and Arshaluys (Louise's mother and sister, respectively). In Paris Louise wanted to continue her musical education playing piano. In order to let her do that, Aslanian, an educated lawyer, who was unable to practice in a foreign country, became a general laborer.

In 1940 Aslanian joined the French Communist Party.

== French Resistance ==
After the Nazis occupied France, the Aslanians joined the French Resistance in 1940. The Aslanians worked in an underground publishing house and actively engaged in supplying fighters of the French Resistance with weapons. Aslanians had connections with Resistance activists : Missak Manouchian, Mélinée Manouchian, Arpen Tavitian, Ayk Dpirian, Shag Taturian and others.

== Arrest, concentration camp, death ==
On 26 July 1944 both Aslanians were arrested in France by the Nazis. Louise's diaries and manuscripts were captured and destroyed, in particular, «Histoire de la Resistance» and «La Chute de Paris».

On 15 August 1944, they were taken from Toulouse to Buchenwald. Arpiar was then transferred to the camp Dora-Mittelbau, while Louise was taken to Ravensbrück.

On 15 February 1945, Aslanian, was killed at camp Dora-Mittelbau. Louise Aslanian was killed presumably in Ravensbrück after 2 February 1945.

== See also ==
- Armenians in France
