= Hossein Ziai =

Iranian historian of philosophy (1944–2011)

Academic background
- Education: Harvard University (PhD)
- Thesis: Suhrawardi's Philosophy of Illumination (1976)

Academic work
- School or tradition: Illuminationism
- Institutions: UCLA, NELC, Iranian studies

Hossein Ziai (July 6, 1944 – August 24, 2011) was a professor of Islamic philosophy and Iranian studies at UCLA, where he held the inaugural Jahangir and Eleanor Amuzegar Chair in Iranian Studies until his death. He received his B.S. in intensive physics and mathematics from Yale University in 1967 and a Ph.D. in Islamic philosophy from Harvard University in 1976. Prior to UCLA, Ziai taught at Tehran University, Sharif University, Harvard University, Brown University, and Oberlin College. As director of Iranian studies at UCLA, where he taught since 1988, Ziai established an undergraduate major in Iranian in the Department of Near Eastern Languages and Cultures—the first such degree in North America—and developed the strongest and most rigorous Iranian studies program in the U.S.

Ziai authored eleven books on Islamic philosophy, published numerous articles and encyclopedia entries, and as founding editor of Bibliotheca Iranica: Intellectual Traditions Series, published fourteen titles on a variety of subjects related to Iranian thought, literature and civilization. Beginning with his Ph.D. dissertation under the direction of Professor Muhsin Mahdi (d. 2007) in the Department of Near Eastern Languages and Cultures at Harvard (NELC), he focused his research and publications on elucidating the rationalist principle in Iranian Illuminationist philosophy and its founder, Shihab al-Din Yahya Suhravardi (1154-1191) otherwise known as Sheikh al-Ishraq (Master of Illumination).

In December 2010, Ziai was elected President of Société Internationale d'Histoire des Sciences et de la Philosophie Arabes et Islamiques (SIHSPAI), an international academic society for the study of Persian and Arabic Islamic philosophical and scientific heritages.

Outside his academic career he also had an interest in art, producing oil paintings, pen and ink drawings, calligraphy and watercolors.

== Biography ==
Born in Mashhad, the capital of the Khorasan province of Iran, on 6 July 1944, he belonged to a family known for producing politicians and academicians, one of his earliest well-known ancestors being Mirza Abu'l-Qasem Qa'em-Maqam, a man of letters who briefly served as Prime Minister of Iran in the 19th century.

Outside Persian and classical Arabic, he had a reading knowledge of German and classical Greek and studied Sanskrit with Daniel H. H. Ingalls Sr.

== Education ==
He received his B.S. in Intensive Math and Physics from Yale University in 1967. He received his Ph.D. in Islamic Philosophy from Harvard University in 1976.

== Death ==
On 24 August 2011, at the age of 67, Hossein Ziai died in Los Angeles, United States.

== Research ==
- Development of Illuminationist philosophy in the 13th and 14th centuries and its continuity in Iranian intellectual traditions;
- Advanced Persian grammar with emphasis on stylistics and its typology in Persian.

== Publications ==
=== Books ===
1. Philosophy of Mathematics. Edited and translated, with Introduction, Notes and Glossary of Technical Terms, by Hossein Ziai. Tehran: Iranian Center For the Study of Civilisations [sic], 1980. Pp. 216.
2. Anwâriyya: Early 17th century Persian commentary on Suhrawardî's Philosophy of Illumination, by Muhammad Sharîf al-Harawî. Edited with Introduction and Notes by Hossein Ziai. Tehran: Amir Kabir, 1979. Pp.xxx, 261. (Second edition, Tehran: Amir Kabir, 1985. See also below, C.28).
3. Knowledge and Illumination: A Study of Suhrawardî's Hikmat al-Ishrâq. Brown Judaic Studies 97; Atlanta: Scholars Press, 1990. Pp. xi, 223.
4. Shams al-Dîn Muhammad Shahrazûrî's Sharh Hikmat al-Ishrâq, Commentary on the Philosophy of Illumination. Critical edition, plus English and Persian Introductions, Notes and Indexes. Cultural Studies and Research Institute, no. 736: Tehran, 1993. Pp. xxxix, 766. Second printing, 2002. Pp. xxxix, 766.
5. Suhrawardî's The Book of Radiance [Partow Nâmeh]. A parallel English-Persian Text, Edited and Translated with an Introduction By Hossein Ziai. Costa Mesa: Mazda Publishers: Bibliotheca Iranica: Intellectual Traditions Series No. 1, 1998.
6. The Ball and Polo Stick. A Parallel Persian-English Text, Edited and Translated with an Introduction and Notes by W.M. Thackston Jr. and Hossein Ziai. Costa Mesa: Mazda Publishers: Bibliotheca Iranica: Intellectual Traditions Series, No.3, 1999.
7. The Philosophy of Illumination. English translation of Suhrawardî's Hikmat al-Ishrâq, plus a new critical edition of the Arabic text, with Introduction, Notes, and Glossaries of technical terms, by John Walbridge and Hossein Ziai. Islamic Philosophy Translation Series (IPTS): Provo, Utah: Brigham Young University Press, 2000.
8. Ibn Kammûna's Al-Tanqîhât fî Sharh al-Talwîhât. Refinement and Commentary on Suhrawardî's Intimations: A Thirteenth Century Text on Natural Philosophy and Psychology. Critical Edition, with Introduction and Analysis by Hossein Ziai & Ahmed Alwishah. Bibliotheca Iranica: Intellectual Traditions Series No. 9: Costa Mesa, California: Mazda Publishers, 2002. Pp. ix, 48, 490.
9. Nur al-Fu'ad: A 19th Century Persian Text in Illuminationlist Philosophy by Shihab al-Din Muhammad ibn Musa Buzshallu'i Kumijani. Edited, with introduction and notes by Hossein Ziai [English Introduction] and Muhammad Karimi Zanjani Asl [Persian Introduction]. Bibliotheca Iranica: Intellectual Traditions Series No. 14: Costa Mesa, California: Mazda Publishers, 2012 (posthumous).
10. Sadr al-Din Muhammad ibn Ibrahim Shirazi "Mulla Sadra." al-Ta'liqât, Part I, with Qutb al-Din Shirazi's Commentary on Suhrawardî's Hikmat al-Ishrâq. Edited by Hossein Ziai. Tehran: Bonyad-e Eslami-ye Sadra 1392 (posthumous).

=== Chapters in Edited Books ===
1. "Bîrûnî and Ammonius' Treatise on the 'Differences of Opinions Concerning Principles'." Bîrûnî Memorial Volume. Tehran: Tehran UP, 1976, pp. 185–202. [Includes unpublished segments of Ammonius' treatise, Ikhtilâf al-Arâ' fi'l-Mabâdî' (the Arabic title means "Differences of Opinions Concerning Principles," and the Greek text is lost), edited and published for the first time.].
2. "Beyond Philosophy: Suhrawardî's Illuminationist Path to Wisdom." In, Myth and Philosophy. Edited by Frank E. Reynolds and David Tracy. New York: State University of New York Press, 1990. Chapter 8, pp. 215–243.
3. "Source and Nature of Authority: A study of Suhrawardî's Illuminationist Political Doctrine." In, The Political Aspects of Islamic Philosophy, edited by Charles Butterworth. Cambridge: Harvard University Press, 1992, pp. 304–344.
4. "Definition and the Foundations of Knowledge in Illuminationist Philosophy: Section on Expository Propositions (al-Aqwâl al-Shâriha), of the [unpublished] Text, al-Mashâi' wa al-Mutârahât." In, Papers in Honor of 'Ostâd' Javad Mosleh. Edited by Borhan Ibneh Yousef, Los Angeles: Research & Education Center, 1993, pp. 108–130.
5. "Hâfez, Lisân al-Ghayb of Persian Poetic Wisdom." In Papers in Honor of Annemarie Schimmel, edited by J.C. Bürgel and Alma Giese. Bern: Verlag Peter Lang, 1995, pp. 449–469.
6. "Shihâb al-Dîn Yahyâ Suhrawardî." In, The Routledge History of Islamic Philosophy. Edited by S.H. Nasr and Oliver Leaman. London: Routledge, 1995. Ch. 28, pp. 434–464.
7. "The Illuminationist Tradition." In, The Routledge History of Islamic Philosophy. Edited by S.H. Nasr and Oliver Leaman. London: Routledge,.1995. Ch. 29, pp. 465–496.
8. "Sadr al-Dîn al-Shîrâzî: 17th c. Synchretism in Islamic Philosophy." In, The Routledge History of Islamic Philosophy. Edited by S.H. Nasr and Oliver Leaman. London: Routledge,.1995. Ch. 35, pp. 635–642.
9. "Suhravardî va Siyâsat." In, Muntakhkabî az Maqâlât-I Fârsî Dar-bâri-yi Shaykh-I Ishrâq Suhravardî. Edited by Hossein Seeyed Arab. Tehran: Enteshârât Shafî'î, 1999, pp. 105–125. (First published in Iran Nameh. Vol. IX, no. 3 [Summer, 1991], pp. 396–410.)
10. "Knowledge and Authority in Shî'î Philosophy." In, Shî'ite Heritage: Essays on Classical and Modern Traditions. Edited by Linda Clarke. Binghamton And New York: GLOBAL PUBLICATIONS, Binghamton University, 2001, pp. 359–374.
11. "Nûr al-Fu'âd, A Nineteenth-Century Persian Text in Illuminationist Philosophy by Shihâb al-Dîn Kumîjânî." In The Philosophy of Seyyed Hossein Nasr. The Library of Living Philosophers Volume XXVIII. Edited by Lewis Edwin Hahn, Randall E. Auxier, and Lucian W. Stone Jr. Chicago and La Salle, Illinois: Open Court, 2001, pp. 763–774.

=== Selected articles ===
1. "Translations From the Dîvân-i Shams of Mawlânâ Jalâl al-Dîn Rûmî." The Yale Literary Magazine, New Haven, 1965. (6 pages).
2. "The Bipolar Principle in Rûmî's Mathnawî." In, Mevlânâ. Ankara, 1972, pp. 63–86.
3. "Algorithm and Muhammad ibn Mûsâ al-Khwârizmî." Algorithm, vol. 2, no. 1 (1979), pp. 31–57. [Includes discussion of computational and approximation methods as major advancements in mathematicsS"Algorithm" is Latinized "al-Khwârizmî."].
4. "Truth and Necessity in Mathematics," by Hilary Putnam, translated by Hossein Ziai. Bulletin of the Iranian Mathematical Society (BIMS), no. 9 (Winter, 1979), pp. 135–151.
5. "Elements of Intuitionism." BIMS, no. 11 (Summer, 1980). [Includes a comparison of Brouwer's concept of "primary intuition," with ideas in Islamic philosophy.]. ARTICLE
6. "Modal Propositions in Islamic Philosophy." BIMS, no. 12 (Winter, 1980), pp. 58–74.
7. "Problems in the Philosophy of Mathematics." Algorithm, vol. 2, no. 2 (1980). [Compares and contrast foundations of mathematical knowledge among the three schools of the philosophy of mathematics: Logicism, Formalism, and Intuitionism; and includes a discussion of the realm of "formal" things in Islamic philosophy.]
8. "Vision, Illuminationist Methodology and Poetic Language." Irân Nâmeh. Vol. VIII, no. 1 (Winter, 1990), pp. 81–94. ARTICLE
9. "The Manuscript of al-Shajara al-Ilâhiyya, A 13th c. Philosophical Encyclopedia by Shams al-Dîn Muhammad Shahrazûrî." Iranshenasi. Vol. II, no. 1 (Spring, 1990), pp. 89–108.
10. "Review of Persian Literature, edited by Ehsan Yarshater. Bibliotheca Persica: Columbia Lectures on Iranian Studies, no. 3; Albany, N.Y.: The Persian Heritage Foundation, SUNY Press, 1988. Pp. xi, 526" In Iran Nameh. Vol. VIII, no. 4 (Fall, 1990), pp. 641–650.
11. "Persian Poetry and Poetic Wisdom: Sources for Manuscript Painting Traditions." In, Dragons Heroes and Lovers, edited by Pamela R. Miller. Seattle: Wing Luke Asian Museum, 1991, pp. 10–17.
12. "On the Political Doctrine of Illuminationist Philosophy." Iran Nameh. Vol. IX, no. 3 (Summer, 1991), pp. 396–410.
13. "Explaining the Philosophical Meaning of Sadr al-Dîn Shîrâzî's 'Metaphysical Philosophy,' Hikmat-e Mota'âliyeh." Iranshenasi. Vol. V, No. 2 (Summer, 1993), pp. 354–364.
14. "al-Suhrawardî, Shihâb al-Dîn," in the Encyclopedia of Islam, Second Edition, qv, pp. 781–784.
15. "Dreams, Interpretation of." In, Encyclopedia Iranica. Edited by Ehsan Yarshater, Volume VII, 5, pp. 549–551.
16. "Edition and Translation of the Persian Text, Treatise on Substance and Accident, by Suhrawardî." In, Papers in Honor of Seyyed Jalal Ashtiyani (Jashn-Nameh-ye Ostad Jalal-e Ashtiyani), ed. M. Arab and K. Fani. Tehran: Farzan-e Ruz, 1998. The edition is based on the single known extant copy, at UCLA's Special Collections.
17. "Ebn Sahlân Sâwî." In Encyclopedia Iranica. Edited by Ehsan Yarshater, Volume VIII, pp. 52–53.
18. "Illuminationist Philosophy." In The Routledge Encyclopedia of Philosophy. Ten Volumes, General Editor, Edward Graig. London: Routledge, 1998. Volume 4, pp. 700–703.
