= Djamchid Chemirani =

Iranian musician (1942–2025)

- جمشید شمیرانی
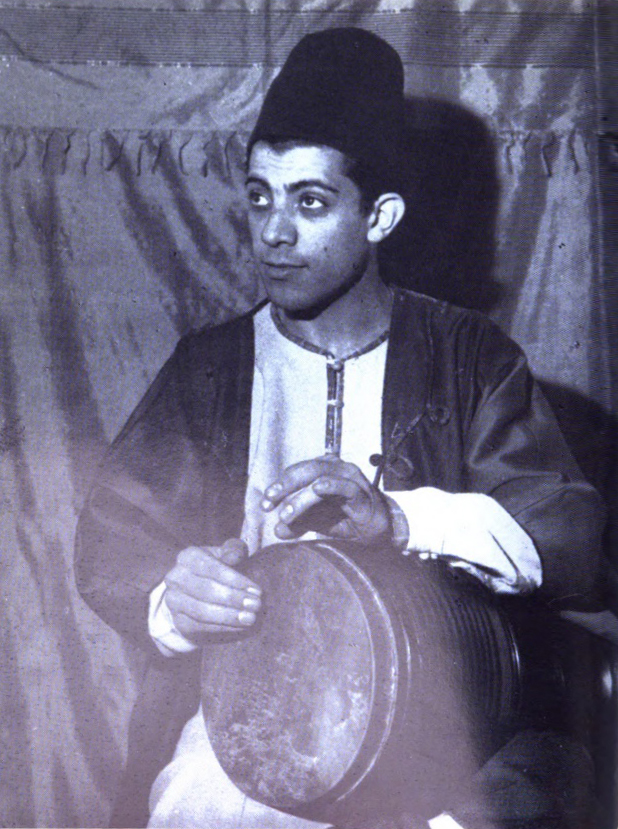
- Chemirani in 1966
- Born: 1942; Tehran, Iran
- Died: 5 November 2025 (aged 83); Manosque, France
- Occupation: Musician

Djamchid Chemirani (Persian: جمشید شمیرانی; 1942 – 5 November 2025) was an Iranian musician and composer.

Chemirani was best known for playing the tombak and for teaching Iranian music at the University of Paris. In 2012, he performed at the Au fil des voix with his sons Keyvan and Bijan.

Chemirani died in Manosque on 5 November 2025, at the age of 83.

== Discography ==
- Musique persane
- Cantigas de Santa Maria (1976)
- Les Maîtres du zarb (1977)
- Radif Tradition musicale de l'Iran (1977)
- Musique iranienne (1980)
- Le Mahabaharata (1980)
- Let the Lover Be (1995)
- An-Ki (1996)
- Zarb Duo Et Solo (1997)
- Estampies italiennes du XIVe siècle (1998)
- Tchechmeh (2004)
- Istampitta - Danses florentine du Trecento (2007)
- Tradition classique de l’Iran (Vol II) : Le tar et le zarb
- Tambours de la terre II
