= Qahraman Mirza Salor =

Iranian prince and governor (1871–1945)

- Eyn os-Saltaneh
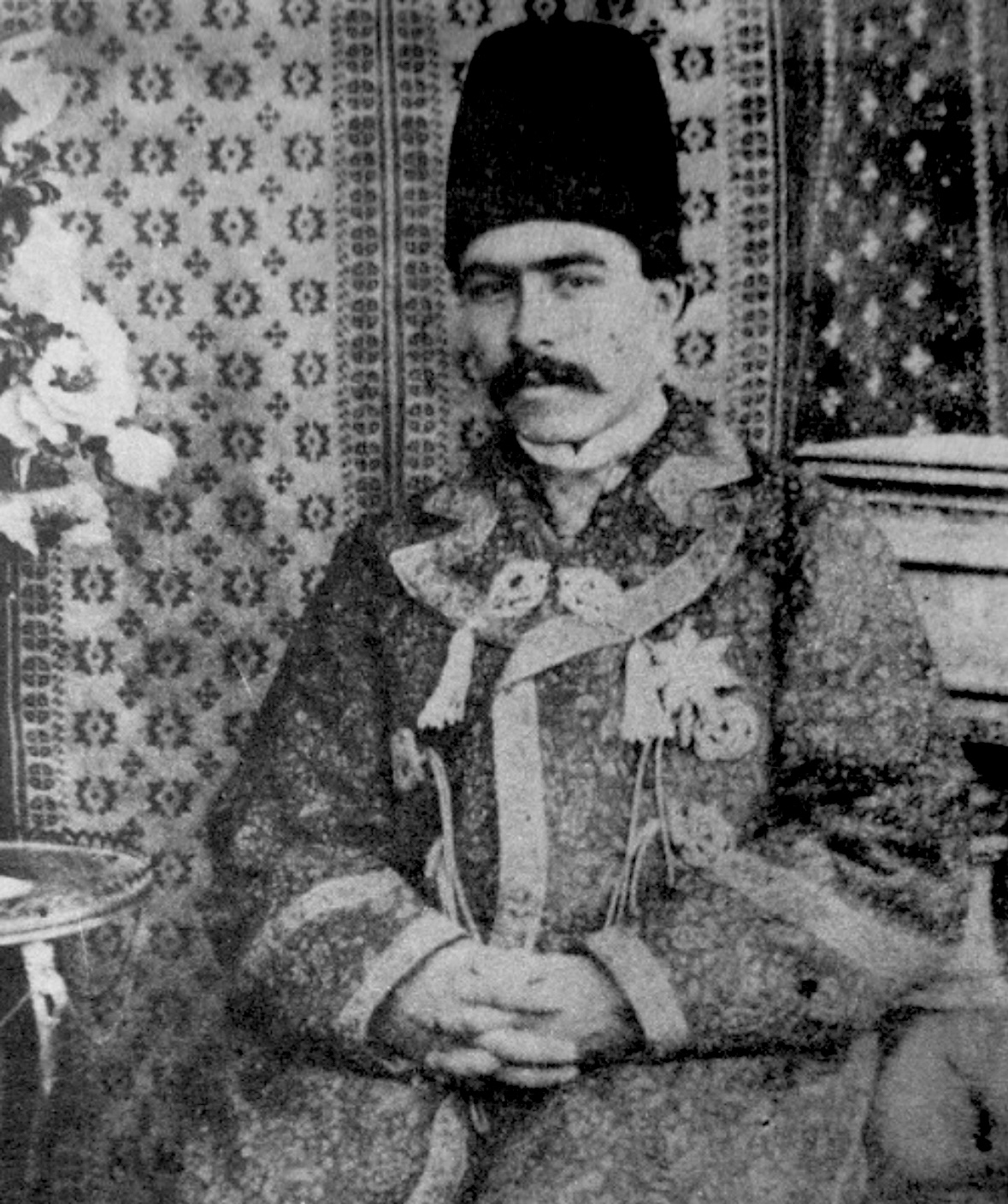
- Born: 21 January 1871; Tehran, Qajar Iran
- Died: 1 October 1945 (aged 74); Tehran, Pahlavi Iran
- Dynasty: Qajar
- Father: Abdol-samad Mirza Ezz ed-Dowleh

Qahraman Mirza Salor Eyn os-Saltaneh (Persian: قهرمان میرزا سالور عین‌السلطنه; 21 January 1871 – 1 October 1945) was an Iranian governor and prince of the Qajar dynasty. He is most notable as a diarist of a multi-volume personal diary.
