= Hadi Mirmiran =

Iranian architect

Seyed Hadi Mirmiran سید هادی میرمیران
- Born: March 18, 1945; Qazvin, Iran
- Died: April 18, 2006 (aged 61); Berlin, Germany
- Occupation: Architect
- Awards: "Ostad Pirnia" Award (2000); Winner of “Mehraz Prize”(2002)
- Practice: Naghsh-e Jahan - Pars
- Projects: Iranian Consulate in Frankfurt; Iran National Library

Seyed Hadi Mirmiran (in Persian سید هادى ميرميران) was an Iranian architect, and manager of Naghsh-e Jahan - Pars Consulting Company. He was born in 1945 in Qazvin, received his M.A. in architecture from the faculty of fine arts of Tehran University in 1968.

== Career ==
His professional life can be divided into three periods:

- 1968 to 1979 : Chief architect in architectural workshop of National Iranian steel Company, Town planning Department.

- 1980 to 1988 : Chief architect in design department of Khanesazi-e-Iran Company and the chief architect in the design department of Isfahan's General office of housing and urban development.

- 1988 to 2006 : Director and the principal architect of Naghsh-e-Jahan Pars Consulting Engineers.

Notable projects (alone or with Naghsh-e-Jahan Pars):

- Rafsanjan Sport Complex.
- The Embassy of I.R. Iran in Berlin.
- First prize in the competition of National Academies of Islamic Republic of Iran, 1994.
- First prize in the competition for Museum of Center of Presidential Documents, 1994.
- First prize in the competition of New Building of Ministry of Energy Headquarters, 1996.
- First prize in the competition for the design of Export Development Bank of Iran Headquarters, 1997.
- First prize in the competition held for Integration of Imam Reza's Shrine and Its Surrounding Urban fabric, 1998.
- The selected project in the competition held for the design of History Museum of California- FREZNO, 1999.

Teaching Positions

- Professor of Architecture, Faculty of Architecture, Elm-o-Sanaate Iran
- University, from 1991 to 1997.
- Professor of Architecture, Faculty of Architecture, Islamic Azad
- University of Tehran, 1992 to present.
- Professor of Architecture, Faculty of Architecture, Islamic Azad
- University of Shiraz, 1995 to present.
- Professor of Architecture, Faculty of Architecture, Islamic Azad
- University of Hamedan, 1995 to present.

== Sources ==
- https://web.archive.org/web/20090316083736/http://njp-arch.com/biography.htm
