= Mahbanoo Tata =

Indian-born Iranian statistician (1942–2023)

- Born: 26 April 1942
- Died: 7 August 2023 (aged 81)
- Known for: Contributions to Iranian statistics
- Scientific career
- Fields: Statistician
- Workplaces: Purdue University, Sharif University of Technology, Shahid Bahonar University of Kerman

Mahbanoo Tata (26 April 1942 – 7 August 2023) was an Indian-born Iranian statistician. She was widely regarded as the founder of statistics in Iran.

== Education ==
A Zoroastrian (Parsi) from Bombay, she attended her local university to obtain her bachelor's and master's degrees before attending Purdue University where she studied and graduated with a Ph.D. in statistics in 1967. After completing her education, she pursued a career in academia, eventually becoming a professor of statistics at several universities in Iran.

== Career ==
Tata came to Iran after five years of teaching at Michigan State University and spent two years as a statistics professor at Sharif University of Technology. Thereafter, over the course of the following 16 years, she established statistics as a subject at the Institute of Education, Statistics and Informatics, the Higher School of Computer Planning and Application, Iran Azad University, and Allameh Tabatabai University.

In 1989, she moved to Kerman to work in the statistics department of the Department of Mathematics and Computer Science at Shahid Bahonar University of Kerman. She oversaw the same department for many years.

Tata was a member of scientific organisations including the International Institute of Statistics, the Iranian Society of Mathematicians, and the Iranian Society of Statistics. She was named as "Mother of Statistics of Iran" for all the contributions she made to Iran's statistical expertise.

== Death ==
Mahbanoo Tata died on 7 August 2023, at the age of 81.
