= Ali Asghar Mohtaj =

Iranian painter and designer (born 1943)

Ali Asghar Mohtaj علی‌اصغر محتاج
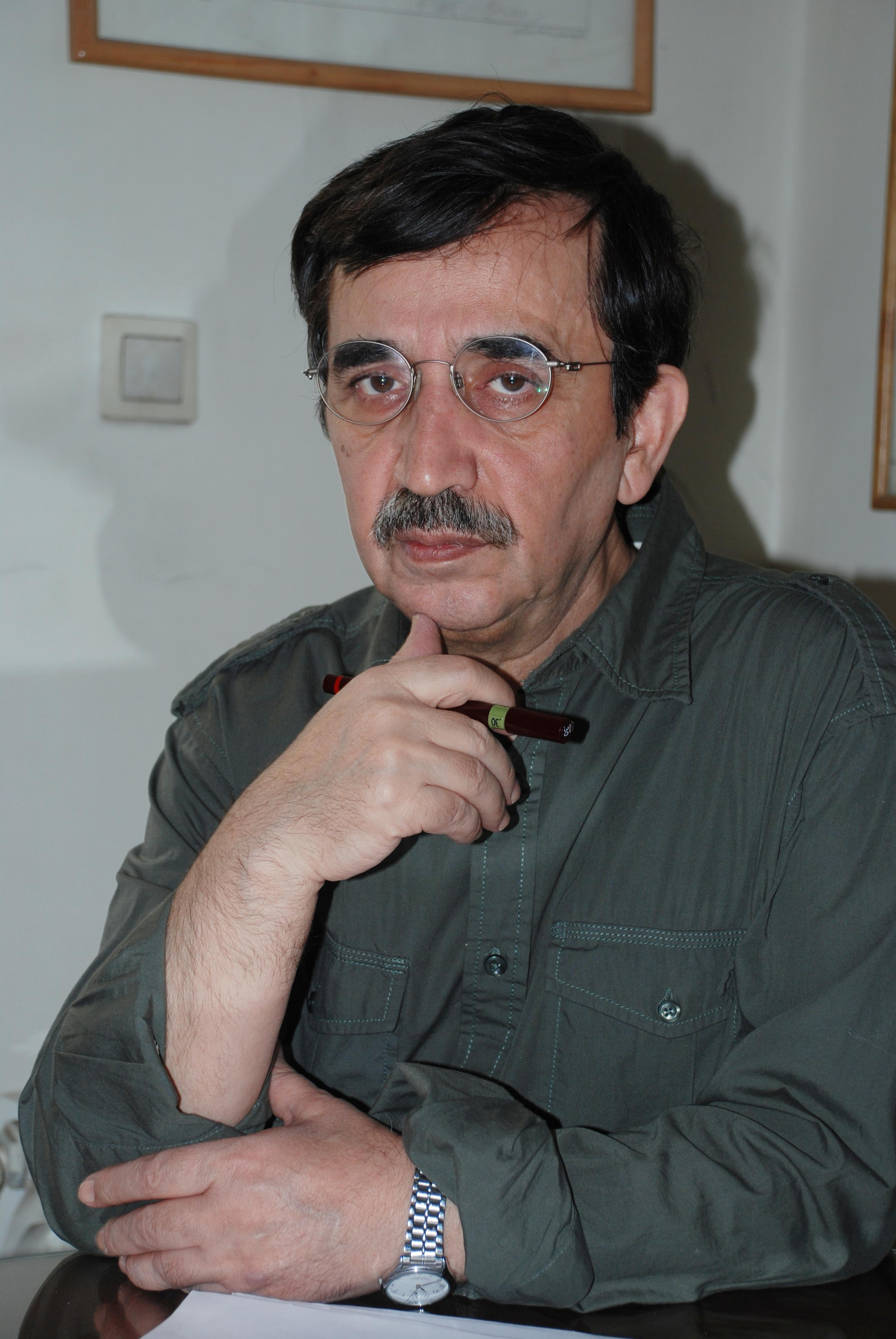
- Ali Asghar Mohtaj
- Born: December 27, 1943; Hamedan, Iran
- Education: Painting at Tehran University
- Known for: Graphic Design, Painting, Poetry, Literature
- Notable work: Cast of Dalirane Tangestan

Ali Asghar Mohtaj (Persian: علی‌اصغر محتاج; b. 1943) is a contemporary Iranian painter and Graphic Designer. He studied painting and graduated from the Faculty of Fine Arts at Tehran University in 1966.

He was employed at National Iranian Radio and Television in 1972 and worked as a graphic designer at Soroush Publication. One of his most prominent works of art was creating the title sequence of "Dalirane Tangestan" series in the form of animation. He designed the poster for the film "Mina of the Silent City" (original title Minā-ye Shahr-e Khāmoush) directed by Amir Shahab Razavian. He was secretary of the first Biennial of Iranian Graphic Design.

== Exhibitions ==
- Ghandriz Gallery – Group Exhibition – 1966
- Sabz Gallery – Solo Exhibition – 1996
- Homa Gallery – Solo Exhibition – 2007
- Imam Ali Museum – “A selection of Iranian Theatre Posters from 1970 to 1990” – Group Exhibition – 2013
- A Gallery – “Marked Designer”, Arapik Baghdasarian's Artworks – Group Exhibition – 2017

== Academic career ==
He has been professor of graphic design at the University of Tehran.
