= Louise Aslanian =

WWII French-Armenian resistance activist

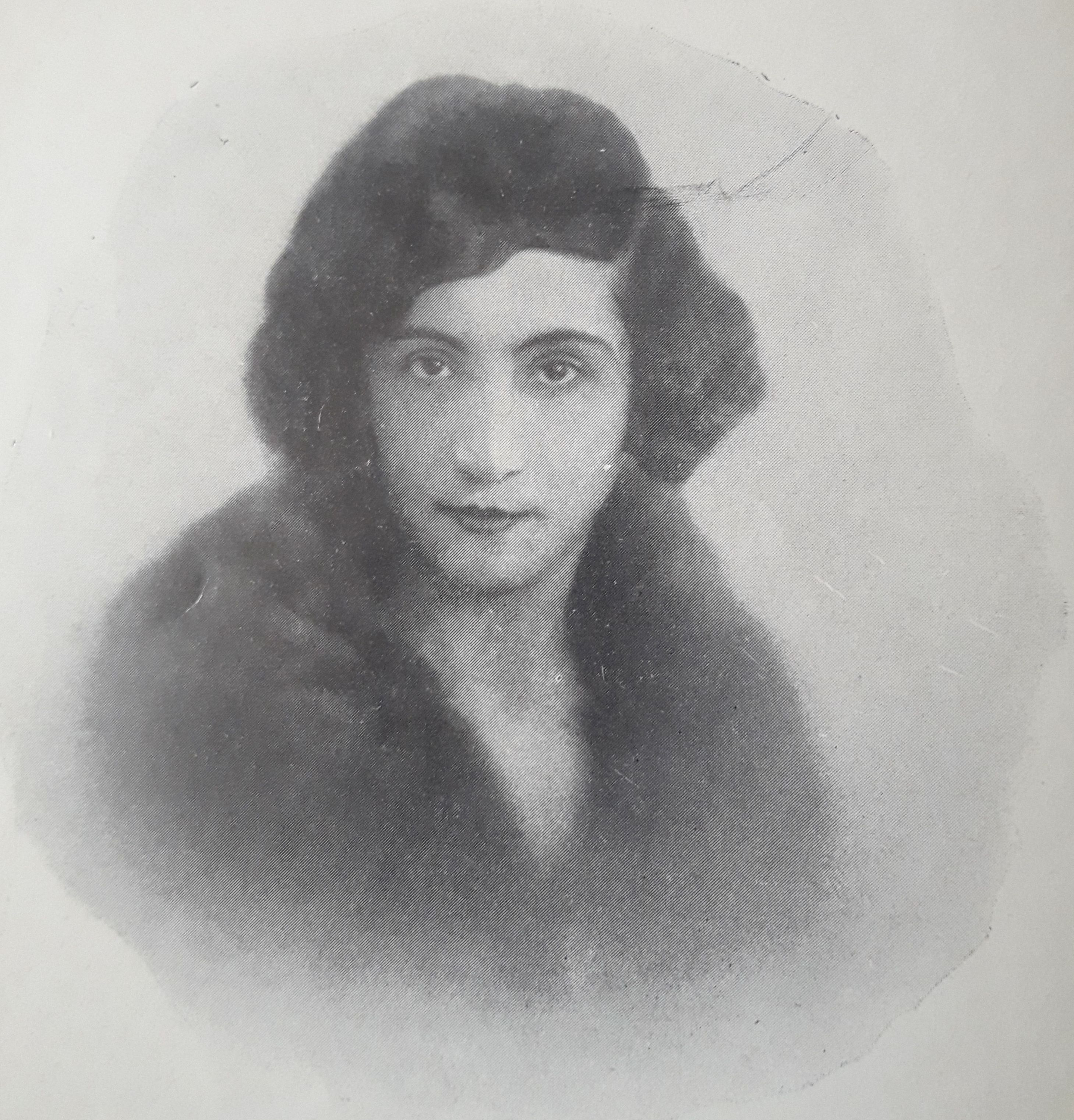
- Born: 5 May 1904; Tabriz, Qajar Iran
- Died: 30 January 1945 (aged 40); Ravensbrück concentration camp, Nazi Germany
- Other names: Լուիզա Ասլանյան; LAS (lit.); Madeleine (polit.)
- Occupations: Trade unionist, writer, poet, political activist
- Organization: FTP-MOI
- Political party: French Communist Party (from 1936)
- Movement: French Resistance, Anti-fascism
- Spouse: Arpiar Aslanian

Louise Aslanian (pseudonym LAS; French: Louise Aslanian, Lass, Armenian: Լուիզա Ասլանյան; 5 May 1904 – 30 January 1945) was a French-Armenian communist and anti-fascist activist, writer, novelist, poet and a prominent figure in the French Resistance.

== Biography ==
=== Early life ===
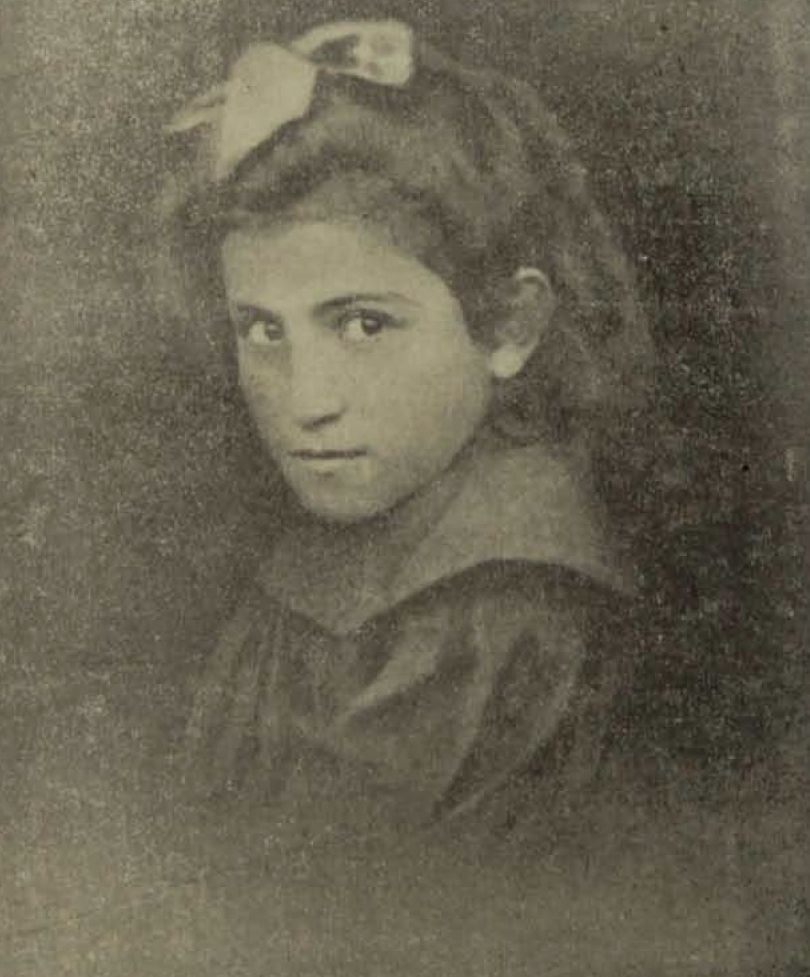
Louise Aslanian at age 6

Louise Srapionovna Aslanian (Grigorian) was born on 5 May 1904 in Tabriz (Iran) to Armenian parents Srapion Grigorian and Maria (née Shahbazian). Louise graduated from a primary school in Tabriz and then continued her studies at a Tiflis Russian gymnasium. She demonstrated her literary gift in school by writing lyrical poems, and making literature translations from Russian and French. Aslanian started playing piano from an early age. Upon her return to Tabriz, in 1923 she married the lawyer Arpiar Aslanian.

=== Life in France ===
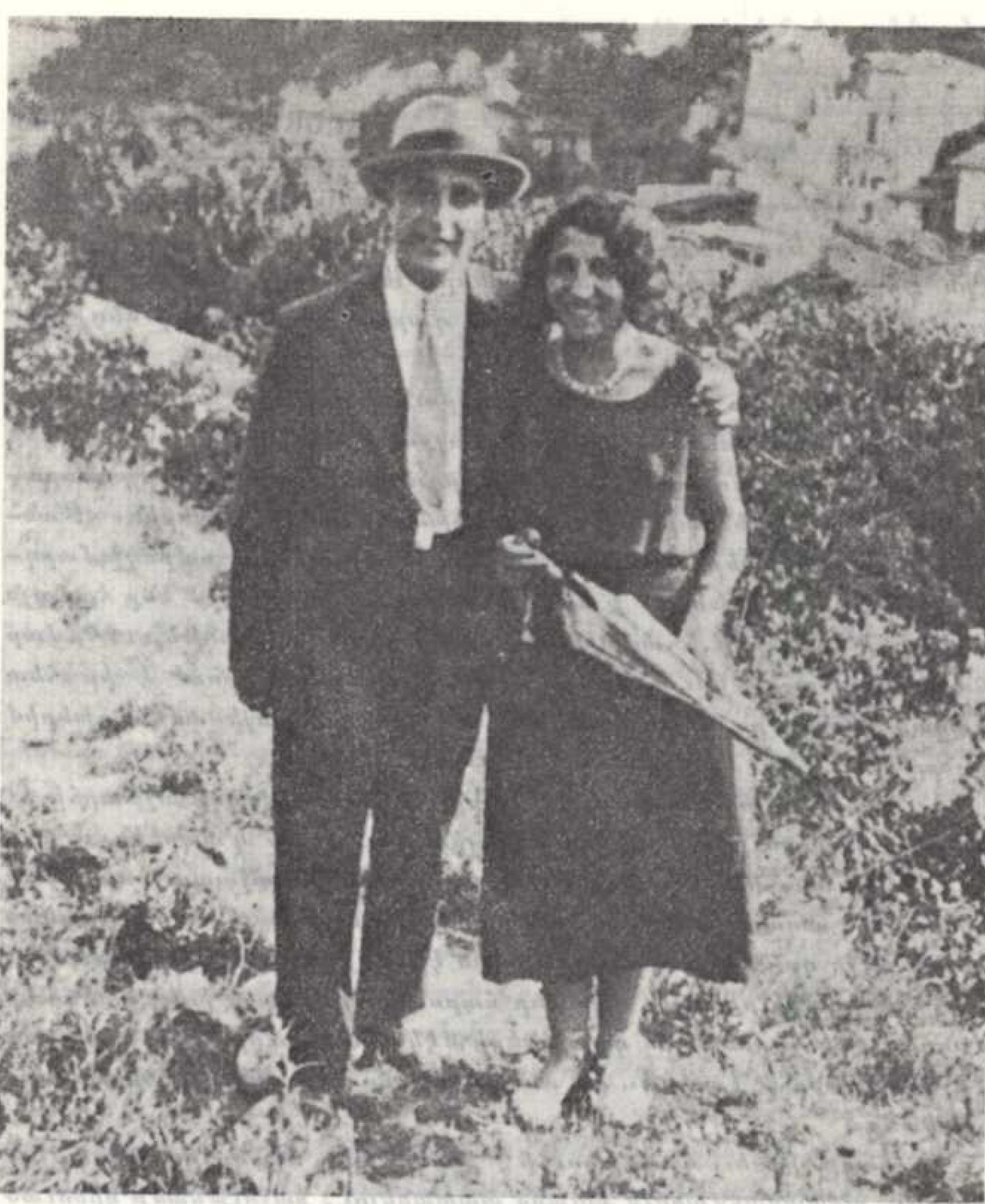
Louise and Arpiar Aslanians in France

In 1923, the couple moved to Paris, taking with them Mania and Arshaluys (Louise's mother and sister, respectively). In Paris, Aslanian wanted to continue her musical education playing piano, but due to lack of money she had to give up her dream. Instead, she went to the faculty of literature at the Sorbonne. In Paris she took an active part in the work of the Armenian-French writers' society, worked in newspapers, acquired acquaintances in literary circles and took the pseudonym "LAS".

In the mid-twenties she published several short stories in the French-Armenian press: "a Coin Collection", "An Iron Wine Seller", "The Swamp", etc.

In 1936, Aslanian joined the French Communist Party and began to collaborate with the Armenian newspaper Manouchian "Zangou". She also worked in the newspaper "New life". In the same year she published her novel "Kaskatsneri Ughiner" ("The Way of doubt»), in two volumes (also published after Aslanian's death in 1959 in Yerevan).

In 1937, Las became the Chairman of the Committee of assistance to Armenia (HOC), as well as the Chairman of the Union of Armenian women of Paris. Aslanian was a member of the Union of Armenian writers France.

=== French Resistance ===
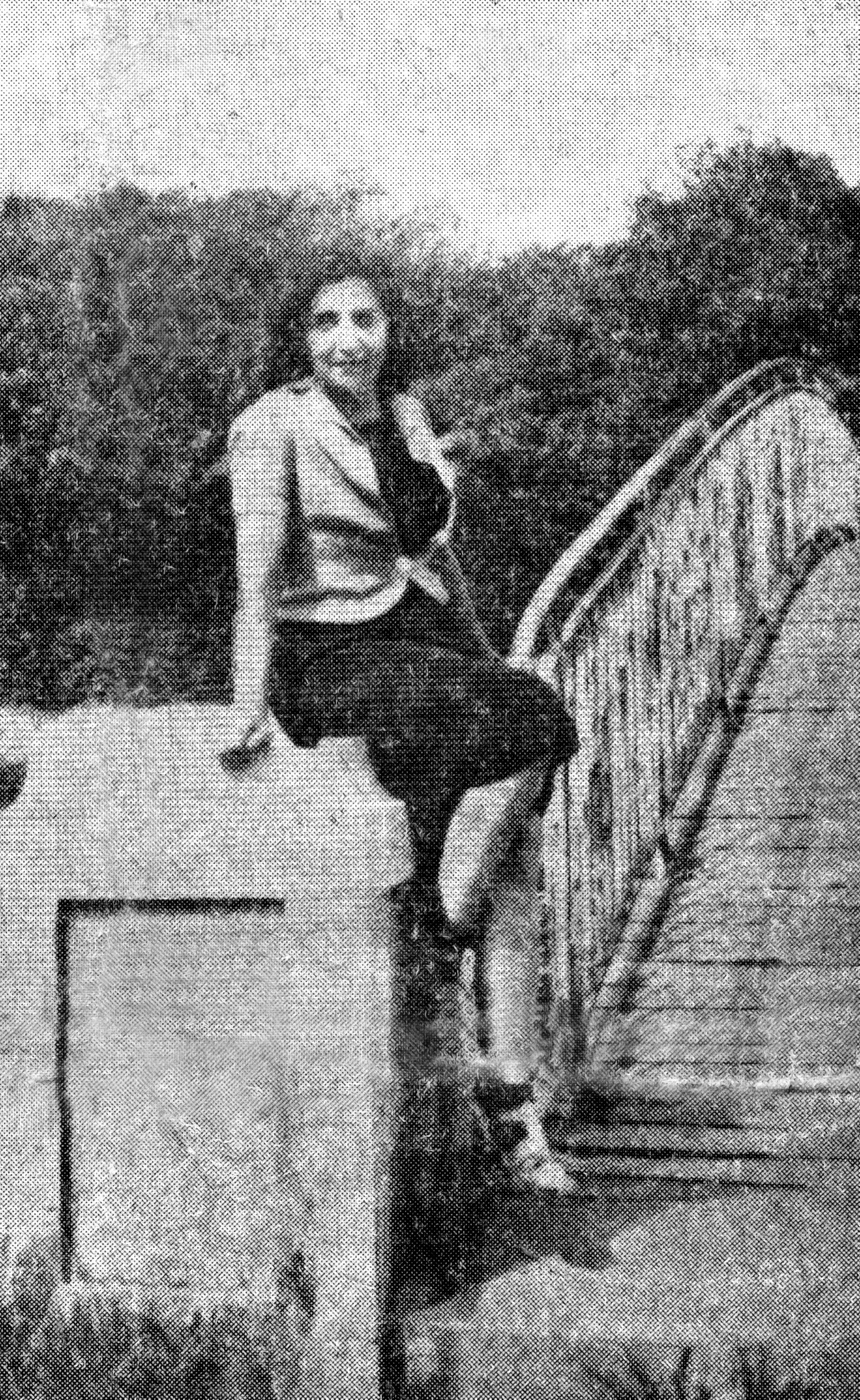
Louise Aslanian on a bridge in France. One of the last photographs of her before the arrest (24 July 1944)

After the Nazis occupied France in 1940, the Aslanians joined the French Resistance. According to the memoirs of Henry Karajan (member of the "Group of Manouchian"), Louise was a recruiter for (Francs-Tireurs et Partisans) in a combat cell of the French Communist Party, formed in late 1941. The Aslanians also worked in an underground publishing house and actively engaged in supplying fighters of the French Resistance with weapons. Las opened the women's division of the French Resistance and was responsible for the Armenian Resistance in the Northern France. Aslanian had connections with Resistance activists: Missak Manouchian, Mélinée Manouchian, Arpen Tavitian, Ayk Dpirian, Shag Taturian and others. In the French Resistance, Aslanian was called "Madeleine". During the Resistance, the Aslanians taught math and chess to the young Charles Aznavour.

=== Arrest, concentration camp, death ===
On 26 July 1944 both Aslanians were arrested in France by the Nazis. Arrest happened at the sight of their family and neighbors at their residence (8 rue d'Elix 10, Paris, France). The couple were put into the Fresnes Prison.

Louise's diaries and manuscripts were captured and destroyed, in particular, «Histoire de la Resistance» and «La Chute de Paris».

On 15 August 1944, they were taken from Toulouse to Buchenwald. Arpiar was then transferred to the camp Dora-Mittelbau, while Louise was taken to Ravensbrück, arriving there approximately on 1 September 1944. She was assigned the camp number 57440. As early as 4 September 1944, Louise was transferred to work at the factory camp HASAG in the vicinity of Leipzig, which was a satellite camp to Buchenwald. Here she was registered under the number of 4460. Las was held in this camp with Lise London. There is some archival information concerning Aslanian's presence at camp Stalag IV-E.

While in concentration camps, Aslanian wrote the poem "Gortsaranum" ("The plant") and the unfinished poem "Mala" (an abbreviation of 4 names of those dear to her: "M" — mom Mania; A — sister Arshaluys; "L" — she, Louise; A — husband, Arpiar). The poem has been preserved thanks to her friends: Nicole Ritz and Lise London.

On 27 January 1945, Louise was taken back to Ravensbrück, where she died 3 days later under unknown circumstances. On 15 February 1945, her husband, Arpiar, was killed at camp Dora-Mittelbau.

== Legacy ==
Manuscripts of the last years of her life, as well as diaries and correspondence, are thought to have been completely destroyed by the Nazis. Only her earlier stories and a novel have outlived the Nazis. Some fragments of her letters have also been preserved. Her archive is kept at the Museum of Literature and Arts after Yeghiche Charents in Yerevan, Armenia.

In 1956 her collection of stories "Gtsits durs" ("Beyond the line") was published in Beirut, Lebanon with an introduction by Armenian writer and journalist Siran Seza.

The Arabic fund of the Matenadaran has a collection of Eastern medieval miniatures with Sufi themes that belonged to Aslanian.

In her works, Las talked about the life of the Armenian diaspora communities that had lost themselves; about their disunity and backward customs, such as blindly following local cultures. She saw the restoration of national integrity as a return to distinctiveness, in a search for a unique path of development, associated with repatriation and strong links to Armenia. As a member of the French Communist Party, she promoted the achievements of the Soviet Union. Her last verses were devoted to the struggle against fascism and the impending victory over it.

=== Novels ===
- 1936 — "The Way of doubt"

=== Tales ===
- 1920 — "The Coin Collection»
- 1920 — "the Iron wine Seller»
- 1920s — "the Swamp"
- 1928 — "Khan"
- 1956 — "Beyond the line"

=== Verse ===
- 1944–1945 — "At the Factory"
- 1944–1945 — "MALA"

=== Historical works ===
- 1940s — "The History of Resistance." The manuscript is considered to be destroyed by Gestapo in 1944-1945.
- 1940s — "The Fall of Paris". The manuscript is considered to be destroyed by Gestapo in 1944-1945.

== See also ==
- Armenians in France
