= Muhammad Amin al-Imami al-Khu'i =

Iranian faqih and writer

Muhammad-Amin al-Imami al-Khu'i
- محمد أمين الإمامي الخوئي
- Born: 1885; Najaf, Baghdad vilayet, Ottoman Empire
- Died: 1948; Tehran, Imperial State of Iran
- Resting place: Najaf
- Occupations: Islamic jurist; writer; historian
- Writing career
- Language: Arabic and Persian
- Genre: Religious history

Muhammad-Amin al-Imami al-Khu'i (Arabic: محمد أمين الإمامي الخوئي, romanized: Muhammad Amīn al-Imāmī al-Khūʾī), honorifically titled as Sadr al-Islam (Arabic: صدر الإسلام, romanized: Ṣadr-al-Islām; 1885 – June 1948) was an Iranian Ja'fari jurist and writer. An Azeri-Asadi by ancestry, Najafi by birth and Khoei by origin, he was recognized as a first-class mujtahid of Tehran from 1920 to the 1940s, and played an effective role in post-constitutional years. A well-known religious historian and author of many fiqh-related works in Arabic and Persian, however, most have remained as handwritten. In addition, Al-Khu'i was noticed as a book collector and scribe of rare books. He died in Tehran at the age of 63.

== Biography ==
His nasab is Muhammad Amin bin Yahya (1860–1945) bin Asadallah (?–1917) bin Hussein bin Hassan bin Ali-Naqi bin Abd al-Nabi (1738–1788) bin Sharaf al-Din Muhammad bin Ajaq Quli. He traces his paternal lineage to Habib ibn Muzahir Al-Asadi, and maternal to Al-Hurr Al-Riyahi, who she was a daughter of Hussein Khan Donboli. His ancestors migrated from Tasuj to Khoy and settled there. They were known from around the 18th century for their interests in religious, linguistic and literary sciences. Muhammad Amin al-Imami was born in Najaf in 1303 AH/ 1885 AH when his father was a student in Iraq. His father returned to Khoy and Muhammad Amin was four years old. When he reached the age of majority, he began his Islamic education, such as logic, literary sciences and jurisprudence with the scholars of Khoy, including his father and maternal uncle. To complete his studies, he went to Najaf in 1908 stayed there for ten years. He studied with Mohammed Kazem Yazdi, Abdallah Mazandarani, Hassan al-Sadr, Ahmad Shirazi, Ali Muhammad Najafabadi, Muhammad Kazim Khurasani and Fethullah Qa'ravi Isfahani. Some ijazah was issued to him by Isfahani and al-Sadr declaring that he attained the rank of ijtihad in May 1918.

In 1919 he returned to Iran and settled in Tehran as a mujtahid. He worked in religious affairs and devoted himself to writing, teaching, and researching, and wrote more than fifty works. He was also interested in literature and composed two poems in Persian and Arabic. He had an abundant love for collecting books, made a large library, and was an scribe of rare books. His library contained in its shelves more than 7,500 books, including about 120 manuscripts and an original copy, plus his own works. Most of his handwritten works were transferred to the Mar'ashi Najafi Library in Qom in 1993.

Al-Khu'i died in Sha'ban 1367 AH/ June 1948 in Tehran at the age of 63. His body was transferred to Najaf and buried next to his father.

== Works ==
He wrote many books, books, exegesis and essays on different topics of fiqh in Persian and Arabic, most of them are handwritten, including:

- Arabic: مرآة الشرق في تراجم عمدة ذوي الأثار من رجال الشيعة الكرام, romanized: Mirʼāt al-Sharq : mawsūʻat tarājim aʻlām al-Shīʻah al-Imāmīyah fī al-qarnay al-thālith ʻashar wa-al-rābiʻ ʻashar, lit. 'The Mirror of the East; On the biography of the great sequel men of the honorable Shias',
- Arabic: مذكرات شاهد عيان عن ثورة النجف 1336 ه / 1918 م /, romanized: Mudhakkirāt shāhid ʻiyān ʻan thawrat al-Najaf 1336 H / 1918 M, about Siege of Najaf (1918)
- Arabic: فرحة المهموم فيما انتخبناه من الأحراز والختوم
- Arabic: مفتاح السعادة ومنهاج السيادة
- Arabic: قاموس العرفان في تاريخ المصاحف وتعريف القرآن
- Arabic: غرائب العهد
- Arabic: الفرق بين الحق والحكم
- Arabic: لؤلؤة الزمان في أحوال من أدركناه من الفضلاء والأدباء والمشايخ الأركان
- Arabic: مفتاح السعادة ومنهاج السيادة
