= 1861 in Iran =

- Decades
- See also: Other events of 1861; Years in Iran

The following lists events that have happened in 1861 in the Qajar dynasty.

== Incumbents ==
- Monarch: Naser al-Din Shah Qajar

== Event ==
- Mozaffar ad-Din Shah Qajar was named as crown prince. He was also appointed as governor of Azerbaijan and sent to Tabriz.
