= Mélinée Manouchian =

French resistance member

- Մելինէ Մանուշեան; Մելինե Մանուշյան
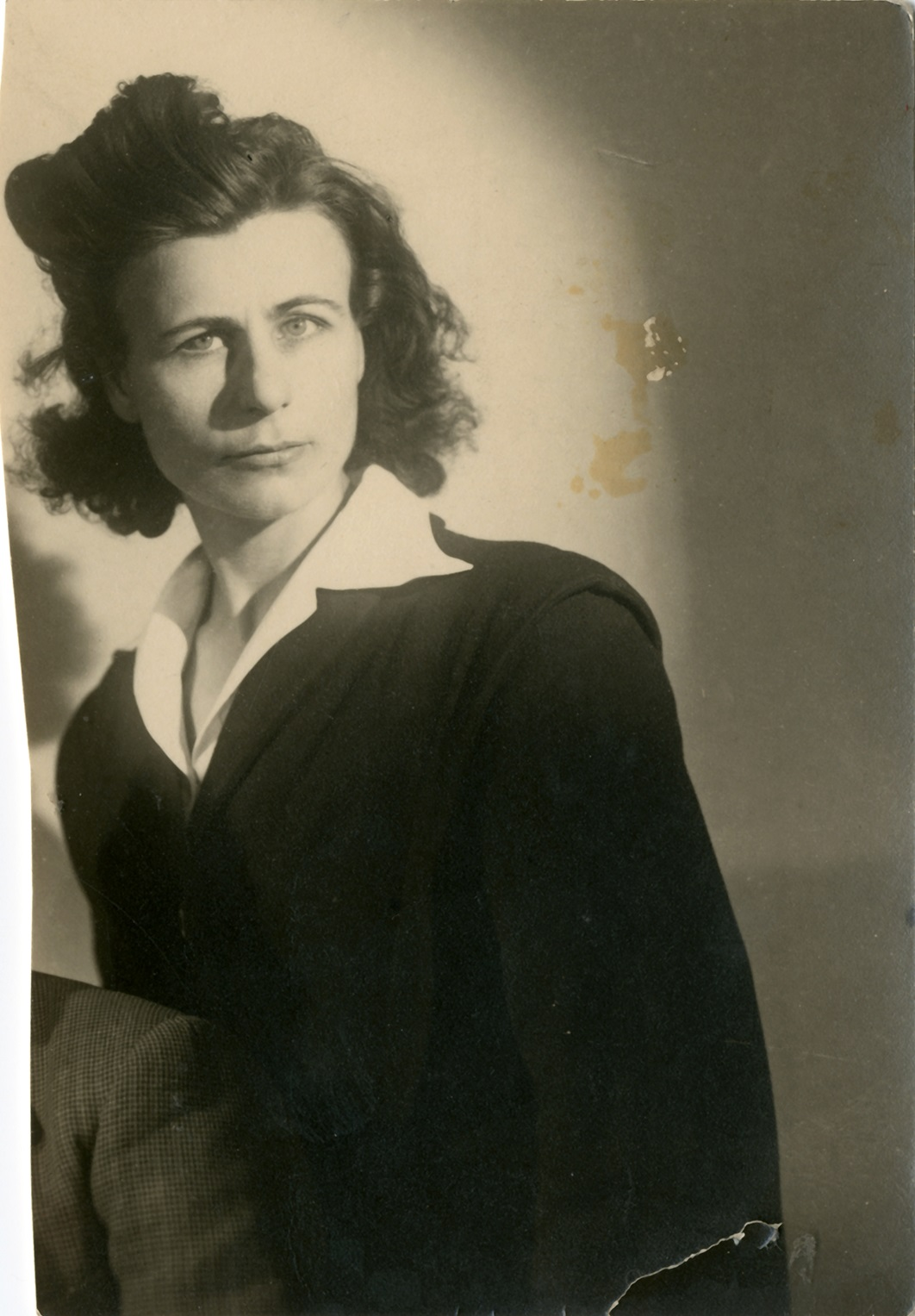
- Manouchian c.1945
- Born: Melina Soukémian; 13 November 1913; Constantinople, Ottoman Empire
- Died: 6 December 1989 (aged 76); Fleury-Mérogis, France
- Burial place: Ivry Cemetery (with Missak Manouchian, until 21 February 2024); Panthéon (with Missak Manouchian, from 21 February 2024)
- Other name: Melina Assadourian
- Organization: Armenian Relief Committee, French Branch
- Political party: French Communist Party
- Spouse: Missak Manouchian (m. 1936; died 1944)
- Writing career
- Occupations: Secretary; writer; French resistance fighter; teacher
- Pen name: Jacqueline Albertini
- Language: French; Armenian
- Notable works: Manouchian, 1974

Signature
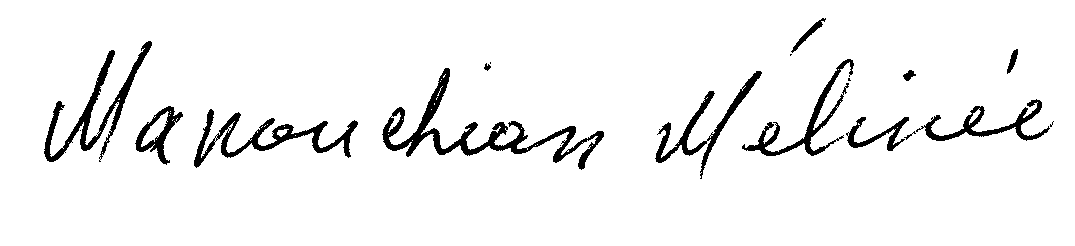

Mélinée Manouchian (Western Armenian: Մելինէ Մանուշեան, Armenian: Մելինե Մանուշյան; 1913–1989) was a French-Armenian secretary, writer, French resistance fighter and teacher, known for being the widow of Missak Manouchian.

== Biography ==
Melina Soukémian was born on 13 November 1913 in Constantinople, Ottoman Empire (present-day Istanbul, Turkey) to an Armenian family. During the Armenian genocide she lost her parents and was taken, along with her elder sister, to a Protestant orphanage in Smyrna. Then she moved to Corinth, Greece. After 1926 she lived in Marseille, France, where she learned French and studied accounting. She met her future husband Missak Manouchian in 1934. In 1935 she became secretary of the Armenian Relief Committee. She was in close contact with Charles Aznavour's family. According to Aida Aznavour, the Manouchians "during the long years — and what years! — played an outstanding role in the life of our family". During the French Resistance she became a heroic companion to her husband. She "posed incognito at the scene of a guerilla attack to observe carefully the movements of each actor and note the results of the operation and the reaction of the public". From the early 1940s she regularly made, copied and distributed forbidden anti-fascist literature. When Missak was arrested for the first time, she asked Micha Aznavourian to take her to the camp at Compiègne on his bicycle. She succeeded in passing some food to her husband (prisoner number 351) and even visited him for a second.

After the last arrest of Missak, she was sentenced to death in absentia, but was hidden and saved by the Aznavourians. After World War II she lived and worked in Yerevan, then in the 1960s she returned to Paris. In 1954 she wrote her memoirs about Missak.

In her interview in the 1985 documentary Des terroristes à la retraite Manouchian implied strongly that the individuals who betrayed the Manouchian Group could be found in the leadership of the French Communist Party. In particular, Manouchian accused Boris Holban of being the man responsible for her husband's arrest, claiming that he refused her husband's request to locate the FTP-MOI group out of Paris and threatened to have him shot as a deserter if he did leave Paris. The American scholar Brett Bowles suggested that Mosco Boucault, the film's director, went out of his way to portray Manouchian in the most favorable light possible. She launched a public debate by stating that comrades of the victims had done nothing to prevent their capture and execution.

== The last letter ==
My dear Mélinée, my beloved little orphan,

In a few hours I will no longer be of this world. We are going to be executed today at 3:00. This is happening to me like an accident in my life; I don't believe it, but I nevertheless know that I will never see you again.

What can I write you? Everything inside me is confused, yet clear at the same time.

I joined the Army of Liberation as a volunteer, and I die within inches of victory and the final goal. I wish for happiness for all those who will survive and taste the sweetness of the freedom and peace of tomorrow. I'm sure that the French people, and all those who fight for freedom, will know how to honor our memory with dignity. At the moment of death, I proclaim that I have no hatred for the German people, or for anyone at all; everyone will receive what he is due, as punishment and as reward. The German people, and all other people, will live in peace and brotherhood after the war, which will not last much longer. Happiness for all ... I have one profound regret, and that's of not having made you happy; I would so much have liked to have a child with you, as you always wished. So I'd absolutely like you to marry after the war, and, for my happiness, to have a child and, to fulfill my last wish, marry someone who will make you happy. All my goods and all my affairs, I leave them to you and to my nephews. After the war you can request your right to a war pension as my wife, for I die as a regular soldier in the French army of liberation.

With the help of friends who'd like to honor me, you should publish my poems and writings that are worth being read. If possible, you should take my memory to my parents in Armenia. I will soon die with 23 of my comrades, with the courage and the serenity of a man with a peaceful conscience; for, personally, I've done no one ill, and if I have, it was without hatred. Today is sunny. It's in looking at the sun and the beauties of nature that I loved so much that I will say farewell to life and to all of you, my beloved wife, and my beloved friends. I forgive all those who did me evil, or who wanted to do so, with the exception of he who betrayed us to redeem his skin, and those who sold us out. I ardently kiss you, as well as your sister and all those who know me, near and far; I hold you all against my heart.

Farewell. Your friend, your comrade, your husband,

Manouchian Michel

P.S. I have 15,000 francs in the valise on the rue de Plaisance. If you can get it, pay off all my debts and give the rest to Armenia. MM

In 1955, on the occasion of the dedication of a street in the 20th arrondissement of Paris named for the Manouchian group, Louis Aragon wrote a poem, "Strophes pour se souvenir", loosely inspired by the last letter that Missak Manouchian wrote to his wife Mélinée:

Mélinée oh my love my orphaned one,
I tell you to live and bear children.

After the execution of Missak, Mélinée never remarried, nor had children.

After the war, Mélinée lived in Yerevan.

== In popular culture ==
Manouchian was portrayed in the 1976 film The Red Poster (French: L'Affiche rouge) by Malka Ribowska, and in the 2009 film The Army of Crime (French: L'Armée du crime) by Virginie Ledoyen.

== Articles ==
- Bowles, Brett (2011). "Historiography, Memory, and the Politics of Form in Mosco Boucault's Terrorists in Retirement". In Sandra Ott (ed.). War, Exile, Justice, and Everyday Life, 1936–1946. Reno: University of Nevada. ISBN 978-1-935709-09-1.
