= 1946 in Iran =

- Decades: 1920s; 1930s; 1940s; 1950s; 1960s
- See also: Other events of 1946; Years in Iran

The following lists events that happened during 1946 in the Imperial State of Iran.

== Incumbents ==
- Shah: Mohammad Reza Pahlavi
- Prime Minister: Ebrahim Hakimi (until January 28), Ahmad Qavam (starting January 28)

== Events ==
=== January ===
- January 19 – The United Nations Security Council took up a formal by Iran against the Soviet Union, for the Soviet occupation of Iranian Azerbaijan.
- January 22 – A Kurdish nation, the Republic of Mahabad, was proclaimed in the north of Iran by Qazi Muhammad, who became president.
- January 26 – Ahmad Qavam was elected by the Majlis of Iran as the new prime minister with a vote of 51.
