= 1941 in Iran =

- Decades: 1920s; 1930s; 1940s; 1950s; 1960s
- See also: Other events of 1941; Years in Iran

The following lists events that happened during 1941 in Pahlavi Iran.

== Incumbents ==
- Shah: Reza Shah (until September 16), Mohammad Reza Pahlavi (starting September 16)
- Prime Minister: Ali Mansur (until August 27), Mohammad Ali Foroughi (starting August 27)

== Events ==
- 1941 Iranian legislative election.

== Births ==
- January 6 – Golnoush Khaleghi, Iranian music researcher, composer and musical arranger.
- January 14 – Hamid Behbahani, Iranian politician.
- January 19 – Khosrow Sinai, Iranian film director, screenwriter, and composer.
- January 23 – Ghobad Shiva, Iranian graphic designer and academic.
- February 2 – Bahram Atef, footballer.
- February 2 – Mahnaz Afkhami, Minister of gender equality, Human rights and gender equality activist.
- February 6 – Bahman Sholevar, Iranian writer.
- February 27 – Khosrow Jahanbani, Iranian royal.
- February 28 – Moussa B. H. Youdim, Israeli-Iranian neuroscientist.
- March 8 – Hamid Shirzadegan, Iranian footballer.
- March 15 – Esfandiar Monfaredzadeh, Iranian film director and composer.
- May 5 – Armen Hakhnazarian, Iranian-Armenian architect.
- May 15 – Ali Ashraf Sadeghi, Iranian linguist.
- July 11 – Nasser Taghvai, Iranian film director.
- July 14 – Ali Akbar Heidari, Iranian olympic wrestler.
- July 24 – Jalal Maghami, Iranian Voice Actor and Actor.
- July 29 – Masoud Kimiai, Iranian film director, screenwriter.
- August 13 – Mostafa Arab, Iranian footballer.
- August 25 – Ali Ashraf Darvishian, Iranian novelist and short story writer.
- August 29 – Kioumars Saberi Foumani, Iranian satirist, writer, and teacher.
- September 9 – Mehdi Chamran, Iranian architect and conservative politician.
- September 11 – Parviz Poorhosseini, Iranian actor.
- September 12 – Jalaledin Moayerian, Iranian film and television makeup artist.
- September 23 – Majid Kiani, Iranian musician and researcher.
- September 29 – Behzad Nabavi, Iranian politician.
- September 29 – Mir-Hossein Mousavi, Iranian architect and politician.
- October 5 – Mohammad Gharazi, Iranian politician.
- October 19 – Anoushirvan Arjmand, Iranian actor.
- November 15 – Bijan Najdi, Iranian writer.
- November 17 – Faramarz Gharibian, Iranian actor and film director.
- November 29 – Ali Ravaghi, Iranian academic.
- December 1 – Shamsi Fazlollahi, Iranian actress and voice actress.
- December 12 – Davood Parsa-Pajouh, Iranian academic.
- December 19 – Rafael Minaskanian, Iranian pianist.
- December 20 – Gholamhossein Saber, Iranian painter.
- ? – Abdul Rahman Haji Ahmadi, Iranian Kurdish militant leader.
- ? – Ali Karimi Jahromi, Iranian Ayatollah.
- ? – Asadollah Bayat-Zanjani, Iranian grand ayatollah.
- ? – Hamid Mojtahedi, Iranian film director and cinematographer.
- ? – Hashem Bathaie Golpayegani, Iranian politician.

== Deaths ==
- January 21 – Abbas Qomi, Iranian Shia cleric.
- April 5 – Parvin E'tesami, Iranian poet.
- August 25 – Gholamali Bayandor, Iranian admiral.
