= Kourosh Safavi =

Iranian linguist and translator (1956–2023)

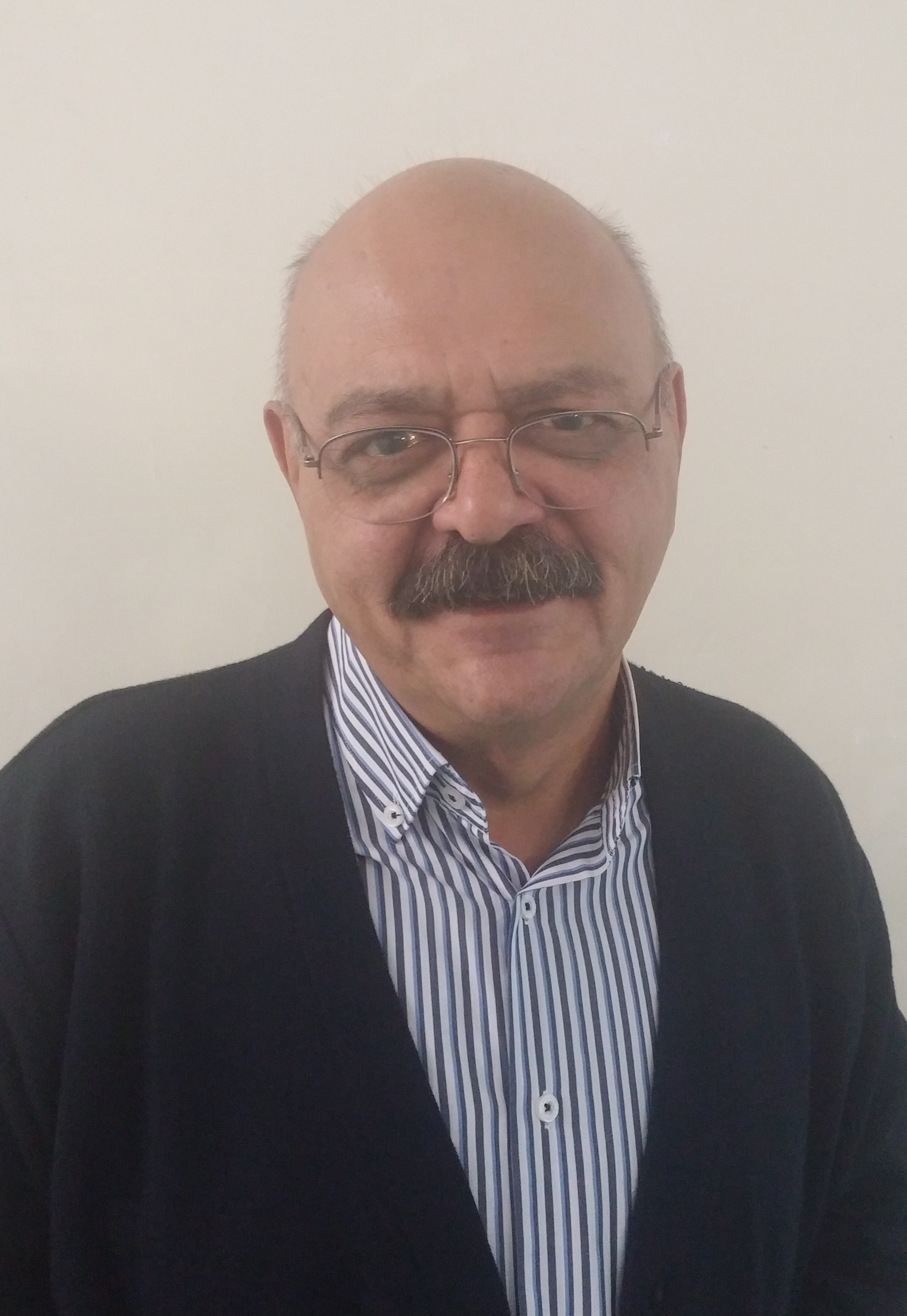
- Born: 27 June 1956; Tehran, Iran
- Died: 11 August 2023 (aged 67)
- Occupation(s): Linguist, translator, professor
- Known for: Authorship, translation

Kourosh Safavi (Persian: کورش صفوی; 27 June 1956 – 11 August 2023) was an Iranian linguist, translator, and university professor. He was the vice-president of the Linguistics Society of Iran and a professor at Allameh Tabataba'i University in Tehran. His work focused on semantics, semiotics, history of linguistics, and the relationship between linguistics and literature.

A prolific translator and writer on linguistics, Safavi authored such books as An Introduction to Linguistics, Wandering in the Philosophy of Literature, Logic in Linguistics, Literature from Linguistics Standpoint, Acquaintance with Written Systems, Introduction to the History of Iranian Languages, and Applied Semantics. He also translated into Persian books written by many notable linguists and writers such as Noam Chomsky (Language and Mind and Language and Thought), Roman Jakobson, Ferdinand de Saussure (Course in General Linguistics), Hösle, Goethe (West-östlicher Diwan) and Jostein Gaarder (Sophie's World).

== Early life and career ==
Kourosh Safavi was born in Tehran, Iran on 27 June 1956 to father Dr. Ahmad Emad al_Din Safavi and mother Parvindokht Javidpour. When he was two months old, the family migrated to Switzerland, Germany and finally Austria. Fourteen years later they returned to Iran where he earned a Mathematics diploma from Hadaf High School in Tehran. He first studied Chemical Engineering at Shiraz University, but returned to Tehran and studied German language and literature at Tehran University. There, he attended Persian literature courses taught by Dr. Shafi'ee Kadkani and Dr. Ali Ravaghi.

In his youth, Safavi was accustomed to linguistic and philological debates, as his father would have such discussions with many notable people, such as Dr. Parviz Natel Khanlari.

Safavi received his Bachelor's degree in German Language in 1971, a Master's degree of Linguistics in 1979, and a Linguistics doctorate in 1993 from Tehran University.

== Death ==
Kourosh Safavi died on 11 August 2023, at the age of 67.

== Bibliography ==
=== As writer ===
- 1981. Darâmad-i bar Zabânšenâsi [An Introduction to Linguistics]. Tehran: Bongâh-e-Tarjomeh va Nashre-e Ketâb.
- 1982.Vâženâme-ye Zabânšenâsi [Glossary of Linguistics]. Tehran: Nashr-e- Mojarrad.
- 1988. Negâh-i be Pišine-ye Zabân-e Fârsi [A short History of Persian Language]. Tehran: Nashr-e- Markaz.
- 1992. Haft Goftâr darbâre-ye Tarjome [ Seven Essays on Translation].Tehran: Nashr-e Markaz.
- 1994. Az Zabânšenâsi be Adabiyyât [ From Linguistics to Literature. Vol. 1: Verse]. Tehran: Nashr-e- Cheshmeh.
- 2000. Darâmad-i bar Ma’nišenâsi [An Introduction to Semantics]. Tehran: Pazhuheshgâh-e Farhang o Honar-e Eslâmi.
- 2001. Goftârhâ-yi dar Zabânšenâsi [Essays on Linguistics]. Tehran: Hermes.
- 2001. Az Zabânšenâsi be Adabiyyât [From Linguistics to Literature, Vol. 2: Poetry]. Tehran: Pazhuheshgâh-e Farhang o Honar-e Eslâmi.
- 2001. Manteq dar Zabânšenâsi [Logic in Linguistics]. Tehran: Pazhuheshgâh-e Farhang o Honar-e Eslâmi.
- 2003. Ma’nišenâsi-ye Kârbordi [Applied Semantics]. Tehran: Hamshahri.
- 2006. Farhang-e Towsifi-ye Ma’nišenâsi [Descriptive Dictionary of Semantics]. Tehran: Farhang-e Mo’âser.
- 2007. Âšnâyi bâ Ma’nišenâsi [Understanding Semantics]. Tehran: Pezhvak.
- 2007. Âšnâyi bâ Nezâmhâ-ye Neveštâri [An Introduction to Writing Systems]. Tehran; Pezhvak
- 2007. Âšnâyi bâ Târix-e Zabânšenâsi [A Short History of Linguistics]. Tehran: Pezhvak.
- 2007. Âšnâyi bâ Târix-e Zabânhâ-ye Irâni [A Short History of Iranian Languages]. Tehran: Pezhvak.
- 2006. Adabiyyât o Zabânšenâsi [Literature and Linguisitcs]. Tehran: Anjoman-e `â’erân-e Irân.

=== As translator ===
- Palmer, F.R. 1976. Semantics: A New Outline. K. Safavi (trsn. Persian). 1987. [Negâh-i Tâze be Ma’nišenâsi]. Tehran, Nashr-e Markaz.
- Gaur, A. 1986. A History of Writing- 1988 [Târix-e Xatt]. Tehran: Nashr-e Markaz.
- Bürgel, J. Ch. 1976. Drei Hafiz Studien- 1986. [Se Resâle darbâre-ye Hâfez]. Tehran: Nashr-e Markaz.
- Jakobson, R. 1976. Main Trends in the Science of Language - 1997[Ravandhâ-ye Bonyâdin dar Dâneš-e Zabân] Tehran: Hermes.
- Chomsky, N.1968. Language and Mind - 1998 [Zabân o Zehn]. Tehran: Hermes.
- Saussure, F. de. 1916. Course de Linguistique Générale - 1998 [Dowre-ye Zabânšenâsi-ye Omumi]. Tehran: Hermes.
- Thrax, Dionysius, 2nd Century B.C. Tekhne Grammatike - 1998 [Fann-e Dastur]. Tehran: Hermes.
- Historisches Wörterbuch der Philosophie. (12 Essays) - 1999 [Zabânšenâsi o Adabiyyât]. Tehran: Hermes.
- Gaarder, J.1992. Sofies Welt. K. Safavi (trans. Persian) - Tehran: Pazhuheshgâh-e Farhangi.
- Culler, J.D. 1976. Ferdinand de Saussure - 2000. [Ferdinând do Sosur]. Tehran: Hermes.
- Chomsky, N. 1976. Language and Thought - 2000 [Zabân o Andiše]. Tehran. Hermes.
- Goethe, J.W. von.1819 West Östliches Diwan - 2000 [Divân-e- Qarbi-Šarqi]. Tehran: Markaz-e-Goftogu-ye Tamaddonhâ and Hermes.
- Collinge, N.E. (ed.). 1990. An Encyclopaedia of Language (4 Essays) - 2005. [Zabânhâ-ye Donyâ]. Tehran. So’âd.
