= Bahman Sholevar =

Iranian writer (born 1941)

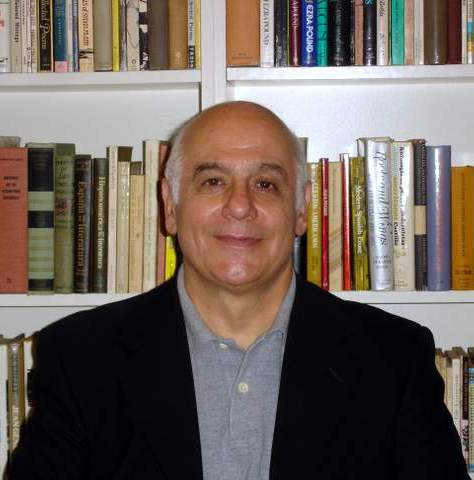
- Born: February 6, 1941 (age 85); Tehran, Iran
- Occupations: Poet, writer, translator, critic and psychiatrist.

Bahman Sholevar (Persian: بهمن شعله‌ور) is an Iranian-American novelist, poet, translator, critic, psychiatrist and political activist. He began writing and translating at age 13. At ages 18 and 19 he translated William Faulkner's The Sound and the Fury and T. S. Eliot's The Waste Land into Persian, and these still are renowned as two classics of translation in modern Persian literature. In 1967, after his first novel The Night's Journey was banned in Iran, he immigrated to the United States and in 1981 he became a dual citizen of the United States and Iran. Although most of his writings in the past 42 years have been in English, published outside Iran; although The Night's Journey has never been allowed republication, though sold in thousands of unlicensed copies; and although the Persian version of his last novel, Dead Reckoning, has never been given a "publication permit" in Iran, at their latest re-appraisals some Iranian critics have named him "the most influential Persian writer of the past four decades," "one who has had the most influence on the writers of the younger generations."

He has had other careers as diplomat, physician, psychiatrist, professor of psychiatry and of literature, radio and television commentator, and an international lecturer on “the creative process,” and on “the psychology of arts and artists.” In the past 42 years he has divided his time between writing, translating, practicing medicine and psychiatry, teaching literature and psychiatry at various American universities, lecturing around the world, and fighting against tyranny in Iran in general, and for freedom and human rights of Iranian people, especially Iranian women and Iranian writers and artists. He writes in five languages, namely, Persian, English, Spanish, Italian, and French.

== Biography ==
Bahman Sholevar was born in Tehran on February 6, 1941, in a politically conscious family. His paternal grandfather had fought alongside Sattar Khan and Bagher Khan in the Constitutional Revolution of 1905 of Iran, and his paternal grandmother was the sister of the famous Sheikh Mohammad Khiabani, another of the freedom fighters for the Iranian Constitution. His father, born in Tabriz, was the first graduate of the Law School of the University of Tehran. He was a judge, a lawyer, and the publisher and editor of the newspaper Sholevar. He also had published a small book of verse in his youth. Bahman's mother was among the first group of nurses graduating from the University of Tehran.

Bahman Sholevar finished his elementary and secondary educations in Tehran. He studied medicine at the University of Tehran, but left his studies before receiving his MD degree to accept a diplomatic post in Turkey, as the Economic Secretary of the Central Treaty Organization (CENTO). He used this position to get the publication permit in Iran for his novel The Night's Journey, a novel which he had written six years earlier but which no publisher had dared to send to the censors' office for a publication permit. He had foreseen that the novel would be banned after publication and that his life would be in danger. The Night's Journey was banned a few months after its publication and the author was able to escape to the United States on his diplomatic passport. He received a fellowship to the University of Iowa's International Writing Program for 1968–1969 and a scholarship to study for a Ph.D. in English at the University of Iowa. (He had a Diploma of English Studies from the University of Cambridge and a B.A. in English from the University of North Texas.) After receiving degrees of M.F.A., M.A. , and Ph.D. in English and Modern Letters (1968–1973) he re-studied medicine at Hahnemann University of Philadelphia and received his M.D. degree in 1976. He followed specialty training in psychiatry at the Medical College of Pennsylvania and became a diplomate of the American Board of Psychiatry and Neurology and began teaching at Thomas Jefferson University and other Philadelphia area universities. He has been an elected Fellow of the Philadelphia College of Physicians and an elected member of New York Academy of Sciences.

From 1968 to 1979 Sholevar was an active and vocal opponent of the Shah's regime and an advocate for freedom and human rights in Iran, until the latter's overthrow by the Iranian revolution of 1979. Immediately after that revolution, he became an equally vocal and active opponent of the corrupt theocratic tyranny that replaced the corrupt secular tyranny of the Shah. In a satiric poem "An Ode to the Revolution" which he published in 1980 he wrote:

        This well-favored fiend, one more 
        Time after a thousand, has deceived us...
        The crowned butcher is gone; on his 
        Throne sits the turbaned butcher.
        But the play is the same,
        The same the players, 
        With a thousand new masks,
        But with one difference:
        Yesterday's wolves are today's lambs.

And in his novel Dead Reckoning, the protagonist returns to Iran to attend his mother's funeral, after 15 years of being away, only to be handcuffed and blindfolded and be taken away to Evin prison, to be tortured by the same torturers who had tortured his brother to death 17 years earlier. The only difference is that this time the torturers have full beards and praying beads and recite "In the name of Allah the Compassionate, the Merciful," before they torture.

In 2007, after 42 years in self-imposed exile, Sholevar returned to Iran at the invitation of a group of writers and publishers. His translations of Faulkner and T. S. Eliot had been given the reprint permits and the Persian version of his latest novel, Dead Reckoning, had been submitted by a publisher to the Censors' Office (euphemistically called "the Office of Islamic Guidance."Even though the program to honor him at the "House of Art" was banned by the authorities, the reception and welcome by the writers and the newspapers and magazines were so profuse that finally even the government's radio and television decided to join the flood of interview-seekers.

He extended his self-imposed exile in the United States indefinitely and became a citizen of the United States in 1981. He did not visit Iran again until 2007, after 42 years of absence. Even though his translations have been allowed republication in Iran, his original writings still are under a ban. His last novel in Persian, titled Bi Lengar, has been awaiting a publication permit for nearly two years from the Censorship office of the Islamic Republic of Iran (euphemistically called “Department of Culture and Islamic Guidance.”

Sholevar currently resides in Pennsylvania and writes in five languages, English, Persian, Spanish, Italian, and French. Though most of his publications in the past forty years have been in English, or other European languages.

=== Major works ===
==== Poetry ====
1. Epic of Life, Epic of Death, حماسۀ مرگ ، حماسۀ زندگیٍ (Tehran: 1960).
2. Making Connection: Poems of Exile (Philadelphia: 1979).
3. ”An Ode to Revolution” (Satirical poem), Iranshahr, vol. iii, no. 7, May 1960.
4. ”A Blood Covenant”, Iranshahr, vol. iii, no. 16, July 1960.
5. The Angel with Bush-Baby Eyes and other poems (Philadelphia: 1982)
6. The Love Song of Achilles and other poems (Philadelphia: 1982)
7. Odysseus' Homecoming (Philadelphia: 1982)
8. The New Adam: Poems of Renewal (Philadelphia: 1982)
9. Rooted in Volcanic Ashes (Philadelphia: 1988)
10. "Four poems" in North Atlantic Review: Writers in Exile, no. 4, 1992.
11. Il Rimpatrio d'Odysseo/ Odysseus' Homecoming (Italian-English) (Philadelphia: 2009)

==== Novel ====
1. سفرشب (Safar-e-Shab) , Khoosheh Publications, (Tehran :1976)
2. The Night's Journey & the Coming of the Messiah, No. 7 in Modern Persian Literature Series of Columbia University's Bibliotheca Persica, (Philadelphia: 1984)
3. Excerpts from the novel Dead Reckoning, in North Atlantic Review: Writers in Exile, No 4, 1992.
4. Dead Reckoning (English Original) (Philadelphia: 1992)
5. A La Deriva (Spanish Translation) (Philadelphia: 2009)
6. Alla Deriva (Italian Translation) (Philadelphia: 2009)
7. À La Dérive (French Translation) (Philadelphia: 2009)
8. بی لنگر (Bi Lengar) (Persian Translation) (Philadelphia: 2009)
9. Koppelnavigation (German translation ) (Philadelphia:2026)
10. سفر شب وظهور حضرت (Safar-e-Shab va Zohoor-e-Hazrat) (Philadelphia: 2009)
11. Perfection of Pearl (2025)
12. La Perfeccion de la Perla (In Spanish) (2025)
13. La Perfezione de la Perla (In Italian) (2025)
14. La Perfection de la Perle (In French) (2025)
15. A Perfeciao da la Perola (In Portuges) (2025)
16. Perfektion Der Perle (In German) (2025)

==== Criticism ====
1. ”About William Faulkner and The Sound and the Fury,” Translator's Preface, Tehran, 1959.
2. ”About T. S. Eliot’s The Waste Land,” Translator's Preface, Arash, vol. ii, no. 2, Tehran, 1963.
3. ”A New Look at T. S. Eliot’s The Waste Land,” Cheshmeh Publications, Tehran 2007.
4. "The Creative Process: A Psychoanalytic Discussion" in The Arts in Psychotherapy Journal, vol. 8, no. 2, 1981, New York.
5. The Creative Process: A Psychoanalytic Discussion (with W. G. Niederland) (Philadelphia: 1984)
6. "Iran: A history of mysticism, poetry and revolution," The Philadelphia Inquirer, January 5, 1986.
7. "Afraštah, Mohammad Ali"', in Encyclopædia Iranica, Vol. 1, Fascicle 6, London, Boston, Melbourne and Henley, 1984.

“I still remember that voice” . Critical essay in memory of Ahmad Shamloo, Shahrvand Emrooz, no. 61, (Tehran: 2007)

==== Major translations into Persian ====
1. Short Stories by Steinbeck, Hemingway & Chekhov, with a critical preface, Tehran, 1953
2. William Faulkner, The Sound and the Fury, (Tehran: 1956, 1957, 1958...2007).
3. Ralph Nading Hill, The Doctors Who Conquered Yellow Fever, (Tehran: 1957).
4. Sterling North, From Log Cabin to the White House: A Biography of Lincoln, (Tehran: 1958).
5. T. S. Eliot, The Waste Land, Arash, with a critical preface, Vol. II, No.2, (Tehran: 1963).
6. T. S. Eliot, The Waste Land, with a new critical preface, Cheshmeh Publications (Tehran: 2007).

==== Editing ====
1. The Creative Process: A Psychoanalytic Discussion (Philadelphia: 1984).
2. Cereminies: A Book of Poems by John High, (Philadelphia: 1984).

== Critiques of his writings ==
- در باره حماسه مرگ، حماسه زندگی، سیروس پرهام، راهنمای کتاب، فروردین 1340، شماره اول.
- جلال آل احمد: نقد از رمان سفر شب، مجله آرش (سردبیر سیروس طاهباز) ، دی ماه 1346.
- جلال آل احمد: نقد ازرمان سفر شب "سلوکی در هرج و مرج"، ، در کارنامه سه ساله، کتاب زمان، تهران، 1346.
- نادر ابراهیمی: "سفری کوتاه در سفر شب"، روزنامه آیندگان، 5 بهمن ماه 1346.
- کامبیز فرخی: نقد از رمان سفر شب، مجله خوشه (با همکاری غلامحسین ساعدی و احمد شاملو)، شماره 12، خرداد 1347.
- تلویزیون ملی ایران، برنامه آینه، نقد از رمان سفر شب، 30 شهریور1347.
- حسن میرعابدینی : صد سال داستان نویسی در ایران، تهران، 1377.
- محمد علی سپانلو: نقد ازرمان سفر شب، در نویسندگان پیشرو ایران، تهران، 1381.
- حسن میرعابدینی :فرهنگ داستان نویسان ایران از آغاز تا امروز، تهران، 1386.
- Beth Brown: A Critique of Making Connection: Poems of Exile' in Edebiyat: A Journal of Middle Eastern and Comparative Literature, vol. III, No. 2, Philadelphia, 1980.
- کینگا مرکوش: نقد بر فر شب و رجعت مسیح The Night's Journey & the Coming of the Messiah، در ایران نامه، سال پنجم، شماره 1، پائیز 1365.
- محمود کیانوش:"جلوه دوگانگی در یگانگی". نقدی برمجموعه شعرRooted in Volcanic Ashes در فصل کتاب، سال اول، 2 و 3، تابستان و پائیز 1367.
- A Critique of Rooted in Volcanic Ashes in the newspaper of Philadelphia Writers' Organization
- (PWO), 1988.
- A Critique of Rooted in Volcanic Ashes in The Book Report, January–February issue, 1988
- Publishers Weekly, Review of Dead Reckoning, September 28, 1992.
- Rapport Magazine: Review of the Novel Dead Reckoning, Los Angeles, 1992.
- Clarissa Harris Raymond of University of Maryland: A Critique of the novel Dead Reckoning, Chanteh Magazine, vol. 1, no. 2, Washington, D.C., Winter 1993.
- محمد رضا قانون پرور: عصا کش، نقدی بر رمان Dead Reckoning، در ایران شناسی، سال پنجم، شماره 3، پائیز 1372.
- یونس تراکمه: "انتقام یا ادای دین: مروری بر رمان سفرشب "، روزنامه شرق، ششم و هشتم بهمن 1382.
- یونس تراکمه: "نوشتن، رویا— کابوس: مروری بر رمان سفر شب"، شهروند امروز، 2 دی 1386.
- مهدی یزدانی خرم/محسن آزرم: "مردی که زیاد می داند"، نقد نوشته های بهمن شعله ور، شهروند امروز، 2 دی 1386.
- یاسر نوروزی: "شب زنجیری: نگاهی به رمان سفر شب"، شهروند امروز، 2 دی 1386.
- فارش باقری: "زیبائی شناسی تاریکی"، نقدی از رمان سفر شب، روزنامه اعتماد، ویژه نامه، 6 دی 1386.
- مهدی یزدانی خرم: "از روزگار رفته حکایت"، نقد نوشته های بهمن شعله ور، روزنامه روزگار،29 مهر 1385.
- مهدی یزدانی خرم: "روزهای بلند خیابان های شمیران" نقد نوشته های بهمن شعله ور، روزگار، 30 مهر 1385.
- محسن حکیم معانی: "تاملی به حضور روشنفکری در رمان سفر شب"، روزنامه اعتماد، 12 دی ماه 1386
- حسین مرتضائیان آبکنار:"زبان فارسی در حال احتضار"،نقد از سفر شب، گفت و گو با دیباچه،23 خرداد 1386
- علی شروقی: "در باره سفر شب: طرح سرگیجه"، روزنامه اعتماد، 12 دی ماه 1386
- امیر حسین خورشیدفر: "بازیابی زمان گمشده"، نقدی بر رمان سفر شب، روزنامه اعتماد، 12 دی ماه 1386.
- حسین جاوید: "من نویسنده ای ایرانیم"، نقدی از نوشته های بهمن شعله ور، تهران امروز، 13 دی */1386.
- مریم منصوری: "فقط شعر زنده می ماند"، نقد کارهای بهمن شعله ور، روزنامه اعتماد،12 و15 دی ماه 1386.
- فرشته احمدی: " تراژدی شکست نویسندگان یک نسل"، روزنامه اعتماد، 15 دی ماه 1386
- محسن آزرم: "آوریل ستمگرترین ماه هاست" نقدی از" سرزمین هرز "The Waste Land" تی. اس. الیوت، ترجمه بهمن شعله ور، روزنامه'ارگزاران، 22 اردیبهشت 1387.

== Interviews, presentations and discussions ==
- "To justify living is the goal of the poet-novelist," The Daily Iowan, Iowa City, November 1, 1968.
- "Physician: Humanist or Technician?" The Medical College of Pennsylvania, April 13, 1978.
- "The Creative Process: A Psychoanalytic Approach." The Medical College of Pennsylvania, Philadelphia, May 24, 1978.
- "Lecture Series on Psychodynamic Approaches to Literature." The Medical College of Pennsylvania, Philadelphia, September 1978 to May 1979.
- "Struggle for Democracy in Iran." Close-Up TV program, ABC, Pittsburgh, December 14, 1978.
- Canada-AM News Show, Canadian Network (CTV), Toronto, Canada, January 26, 1979.
- MacNeil-Lehrer Report, Public Broadcasting System TV (PBS), February 1, 1979.
- Interview with A. O. Sulzberger Jr., The New York Times, February 1, 1979.
- Interview with A. O. Sulzberger Jr., The Bulletin, February 1, 1979.
- Interview with A. O. Sulzberger Jr., The Globe and Mail of Canada, February 1, 1979.
- Canada-AM News Show, Canadian Network CTV), Toronto, Canada, February 5, 1979.
- "The Revolution & Beyond in Iran: The Psychology of Power." Princeton University, February 7, 1979.
- "The Creative Process and Psychoanalysis." Jefferson Medical College, Thomas Jefferson University, Philadelphia, October 3, 1979.
- "Psychopathology of Multiple Personality," in As It Happens Program, The Canadian Broadcasting Radio (CBC), February 11, 1981.
- "Current Events on Iran." 2-hour panel discussion on The Weekend World, British Independent Television (ITV), February 11, 1979.
- Canada-AM News Show, Canadian TV Network (CTV), Toronto, Canada, March 20, 1979.
- Canada-AM News Show, Canadian TV Network (CTV), Toronto, Canada, April 10, 1979.
- Canada-AM News Show, Canadian TV Network (CTV), Toronto, Canada, November 14, 1979.
- KYW News Radio, Philadelphia, December 1, 1979.
- WCAU-CBS News Radio, Philadelphia, December 1, 1979.
- Channel 10 News, CBS Television, February 7, 1979.
- Channel 3 News, NBC Television, December 2, 1979.
- Channel 3 News, NBC Television, Philadelphia, December 9, 1979.
- Canada-AM News Show, Canadian TV Network (CTV), Toronto, Canada, December 4, 1979.
- MacNeil-Lehrer Report, Public Broadcasting System TV (PBS), December 6. 1979.
- Canada-AM News Show, Canadian TV Network (CTV), Toronto, Canada, January 31, 1980.
- Channel 10 News, CBS Television, Philadelphia In March 1980.
- "News Media and Coverage of International Affairs." New York University, March 1980.
- Canada-AM News Show, Canadian TV Network (CTV), Toronto, Canada, March 11. 1980.
- "The New Cold War: Psychology of Mass Media". Columbia University, April 9, 1980.
- Canada-AM News Show, Canadian TV Network (CTV), Toronto, Canada, July 8, 1980
- Canada-AM News Show, Canadian TV Network (CTV), Toronto, Canada, June 16. '1981
- Canada-AM News Show, Canadian TV Network (CTV), Toronto, Canada, June 30, 1981.
- Canada-AM News Show, Canadian TV Network (CTV), Toronto, Canada, July 30. 1981
- Canada-AM News Show, Canadian TV Network (CTV), Toronto, Canada, September 1, 1981.
- The University City Press Monthly of Philadelphia, "Exiles from the Third Revolution," February 1982.
- "Multiple Personality." Newsprobe, WTAF Channel 29 Television, Nov. 12 & Nov. 28, 1982.
- Invited speaker and discussion group leader on at American Institute of Medical Education's Second Annual Conference on CREATIVITY & MADNESS: Psychological Studies of Art & Artists. Kauai Island, Hawaii, March 26 to April 2, 1983. Presentations included:
  - "Ego Functions in the Creative Act."
  - "A Discussion group on the Creative Process."
- Major speaker at American Institute of Medical Education's Third Annual Conference on Creativity and Madness: Psychological Studies of Art & Artists, Hawaii, April 14 to 21, 1984. Presentations included:
  - Ascent to Heaven: A Psychological Study of the Life and Poetry of Dante Alighieri.
  - Descent into Hell: A Study of Basic Mistrust and Ego Despair in the Poetry of Sylvia Plath and Anne Sexton.
- Major speaker at American Institute of Medical Education's Fourth Annual Conference (Sixth Hawaiian Program) on Creativity and Madness: Psychological Studies of Art & Artists, Hawaii, March 30 to April 7, 1985. Presentations included lectures on:
  - The Journey Motif in Art and Literature and the Quest for Inner Discovery.
  - Order and Chaos in Life and Art.
  - Workshop on the Creative Process.
- Major speaker at American Institute of Medical Education's Fifth Annual Conference on Creativity and Madness: Psychological Studies of Art & Artists, Hawaii February 15 to 22, 1986. Presentations included lectures on:
  - Psychology of Love.
  - Psychology of Aggression.
- A Discussion of the Play Master Harold & the Boys by South African Playwright Athol Fugard.
- Major speaker at American Institute of Medical Education's First European Conference on Creativity and Madness: Psychological Studies of Art & Artists. May 10 to May 25, 1986. Presentation on:
  - Radical Innocence. Marc Chagall, Artist as Lover.
- American Institute of Medical Education's Second European Conference on Creativity and Madness: Psychological Studies of Art & Artists. Presentations included:
  - A Psychological Study of the Life & Art of Claude Monet, Paris, September 12, 1986.
  - A Psychological Study of the Life & Art of Marc Chagall, Cannes, France, September 24, 1986.
  - A Psychological Study of the Life & Art of Rembrandt van Rijn, Amsterdam, September 29, 1986.
- Keynote speaker at the American Medical Education's Conference on Creativity and Madness: Psychological Studies of Art & Artists. New York City (Plaza Hotel), November 29, 1986. Major lecture on:
  - Marc Chagall: Creation as an Act of Love
- "Psychodynamic Psychotherapy of Creative Individuals." Interviewed by Dave Davies on WHYY Radio, Philadelphia, September. 14, 1983.
- "Psychodynamic Psychotherapy of Artists and Scientists." Interviewed by Ralph Collier on WFLN-AM/FM Radio, Philadelphia, September 14, 1983.
- "Emotional Problems Specific to Artists & Creative Individuals." Interviewed by Judy Baca. Today's Post of New Jersey, November 2, 1983.
- "Understanding and helping the Creative Mind." Interviewed by Barbara S. Rothschild. The Courier Post of New Jersey, February 12, 1984.
- "Shakespeare's Hamlet and the Tempest: Resolution of the Oedipus Complex." Presentation at the Third Annual Conference on Creativity and Madness, Hawaii, April 24, 1984.
- "Creativity & the Practice of Medicine." Panel Discussion. Philadelphia Area Physicians' Art Festival. Philadelphia College of Physicians. May 5, 1984.
- "Can Great Literature Make you a Better Doctor?" Interviewed by Helen Mathews Smith in MD Magazine, November 1984.
- "Creative Patients—Creative Analyst." Interviewed by Jaan Kangilaski in Medical Tribune, December 19, 1984.
- "Psychotherapy of Writers and Other Artists." Interviewed by Patricia Lehigh Brown. The Philadelphia Inquirer, December 30, 1984.
- "High Creativity vs. Problem Solving." Presentation at Jefferson Medical College of Thomas Jefferson University, Philadelphia, January 15, 1985.
- "The Creative Urge and the Creative Impulse." Presentation at Philadelphia Writers' Organization (PWO), March 7, 1985.
- "Creativity and Bipolarity". Interviewed by Science Magazine, August 15, 1985.
- "Arts & Medicine." Panel Discussion. Philadelphia College of Physicians. September 11, 1985.
- "Scholar, Physician, Poet, Exile," Interviewed by Nena Baker in Hahnemann Magazine, vol. 5, no. 3, Philadelphia, Fall 1985.
- "Flight from the Shah's 'censors'" Feature Article by Nena Baker in The Medical Post of Canada, Toronto, December 10, 1985.
- "Psychotherapy of Artists & Other Creative Individuals." Broadcast on CNN on July 5, 6, 7, & 8, 1985.
- "La Psicologia dell'Amore e dell'Aggressione e le loro Manifestazioni nell'Arte e nella Letteratura", 1986 Congress of Orthopsychology, Rome.
- "Marc Chagall: La Creazione come Atto d'Amore", 1986 Congress of Orthopsychology, Rome.
- Interviewed by B. Afagh and Mahmood Kianoosh about his literary works on BBC Radio, Persian Program. September 9, 1987.
- Interviewed by Taghi Mokhtar on author's literary works, on the Mirror Program on Channel 56 TV, Washington, January 3, 1988.
- Interviewed by Frank Ford on WDVT Radio, Philadelphia, December & January 1985.
- Interviewed on Frank Ford Radio Show, WDVT Radio, by Jack McKinney, Philadelphia Daily News Columnist, on, January 8, 1988.
- "In Memoriam: A Personal & Historical Assessment of Gholam-Hossein Saedi (1935-1985) and his place in Modern Persian Literature." Presentation at George Washington University, December 14, 1985. Simulcast by BBC and VOA.
- "Psychology of Love & Aggression & their Manifestations in Art & Literature." Presentation at Saint Elizabeth Hospital (in memory of Ezra Pound), Washington, D.C., April 27, 1987.
- Interviewed by Jeremy Taylor of BBC Television on "Creative Individuals & Bipolar Disorder," on September 8, 1987.
- "Culture and Psychiatry." Presentation at State University of New York, Health Science Center at Brooklyn, November 18, 1987.
- WBUX-AM Radio, Interviewed by Joan Stack, Pennsylvania, January 18, 1988.
- "Special Problems—and Responses—of a Creative Mind." 'interviewed by Columnist Darrell Sifford, in The Philadelphia Inquirer, January 25, 1988.
- WBUX-AM Radio, Interviewed by Louis Collins, Pennsylvania, March 18, 1988.
- WXPN-AM Radio, Interviewed by Joan Schuman, Pennsylvania, April 8, 1988.
- Lectures on "The Creative Process," with references to Virginia Woolf, Robert Lowell, John Berryman, Sylvia Plath, Anne Sexton, Dylan Thomas, Vincent Van Gogh, Ezra Pound, and Robert Wagner, in a 17-day seminar, sponsored by International Medical Seminars. Delivered in Indonesia, Thailand, and Burma, February 17 to March 2, 1988.
- Lectures on "The Creative Process," with references to Virginia Woolf, Robert Lowell, John Berryman, Sylvia Plath, Anne Sexton, Dylan Thomas, Vincent Van Gogh, Marc Chagall, and Robert Wagner, in a 17-day seminar, sponsored by International Medical Seminars. Delivered in Kenya and Tanzania, September 2 to 18, 1988.
- Lectures on "The Creative Process," with references to Dante Alighieri, Shakespeare, Robert Lowell, John Berryman, Sylvia Plath, Anne Sexton, Dylan Thomas, Vincent Van Gogh, Marc Chagall, Ezra Pound, and Robert Wagner, in a 17-day seminar, sponsored by International Medical Seminars. Delivered in Egypt in May, 1988.
- "From Don Quixote to Guernica: The Spanish Psyche as represented through Spanish Art & Literature". Two week lectures with special references to Cervantes, Velasquez, Zurbaran, El Greco, Goya, Picasso & Garcia Lorca. Delivered in Madrid, Spain. Sponsored by American Institute of Medical Education. Madrid, September 1989.
- Presentation & Panel Discussion: "Iranian Fiction Writers Writing in a Second Language."
- A Study of Cultural Emigration & Exile, 23rd Annual Meeting of MESA, Toronto, Canada. Broadcast by BBC and Voice of America. November 17 & 18, 1989.
- Iowa City Press Citizen, Interview about Dead Reckoning, September 28, 1992.
- BBC Radio, Persian Program, April 21, 1992.
- BBC Radio, Persian Program, "Oppression and Mass Depression," May 14, 1992.
- BBC Persian Program.' "Like a Ship without an anchor: A dialogue with Bahman Sholevar," by Elias Ahmadi, Tehran, December 12, 2007
- Press TV. "Universality and Modern Persian Literature," Tehran, June 27, 2009.

== See also ==
- Intellectual movements in Iran
- Radio Zamaneh, Bahman Sholevar, Interview & Critique, January 7,2010
- Radio Farda, Bahman Sholevar, Interview & Critique: "Rooted in American Culture," Oct 18, 2009
- Gooya Newspaper, Bahman Sholevar, Interview & Critique: "Modern Persian Poetry Lags Behind World Poetry," Mar 29, 2009
- Voice of America, Interview & Critique of Bahman Sholevar's Works, Dec 15, 2009, Part I on YouTube
- Voice of America, Interview & Critique of Bahman Sholevar's Works, Dec 15, 2009, Part II on YouTube
- Voice of America, Interview & Critique of Bahman Sholevar's Works, Dec 15, 2009, Part III on YouTube
- Shahrvand-e-Emrooz, Life & Works of Bahman Sholevar: "The Man Who Knows Too Much," January 2009, Part I
- Shahrvand-e-Emrooz, "Writing: Dream-Nightmare," A Critique of the Night's Journey, January 2009, Part II
- Shahrvand-e-Emrooz, "Serial Night," A Review of The Night's Journey, January 2009, Part III
- Aftab-e-Yazd Newspaper, Bahman Sholevar, Interview & Critique: "Modern Persian Poetry Lags Behind World Poetry," Apr 6, 2008
- ISNA News, Bahman Sholevar, Interview & Critique: "Modern Persian Poetry Lags Behind World Poetry," Apr 5, 2008
- ISNA News, News Report, "Bahman Sholevar Publishes his Works in IRAN," Dec 16, 2007
- ISNA News, News Report "A Review of Bahman Sholevar's DEAD RECKONING," Dec 14, 2007
- ISNA News, News Report "Homage to Bahman Sholevar After Forty Two Years," Dec 14, 2007
- BBC, "Like a Ship without a Rudder," Bahman Sholevar Inverviewed by Elyas Ahmadi, Dec 18, 2007
- BBC, "Homage to Bahman Sholevar: Giving out the Awards of Critics & Journalists," Dec 14, 2007
- Radio Farhang, Mohsen Maani's Interview with Bahman Sholevar: A Critique of The Night's Journey & his other Works, December 2007, Part I
- Radio Farhang, Mohsen Maani's Interview with Bahman Sholevar: A Critique of The Night's Journey & his other Works, December 2007, Part II
- Radio Farhang, Mohsen Maani's Interview with Bahman Sholevar: A Critique of The Night's Journey & his other Works, December 2007, Part III
- List of Books Banned in Iran
- Davat News, "Authors Leaving The Scene"

- Tabyan, A Dialogue With Bahman Sholevar, April 8, 2008
- Tadane, Reportage, A Night's Journey With Bahman Sholevar, December 13, 2007
- DiacheE News, "The Persian Language In Extremis" by Hossein Mortezaiian Abkenar
- Etemad Newspaper, "Remembrance of Things Past," A Dialogue With Bahman Sholevar, January 2, 2008
- "Concerning The Narrative in The Novel The Night's Journey," by Mahmoud Hamidi, November 5, 2008
- Kapookoore News, A Critique of The Night's Journey, September 17, 2007
- Davaat News, A Dialogue With Bahman Sholevar, Parts I & II
- Irib TV2, Interview With Bahman Sholevar in Documentary Film about Jalal-e-AleAhmad
- Tehran-e-Emrooz Newspaper, A Dialogue With Bahman Sholevar, Author of The Night's Journey November 5, 2008
- Etemad Melli, Homage To 5 Distinguished Literary Figures on The Fifth Anniversary of publication of Goharan, Literary Quarterly, December 16, 2007
- A Glimpse at T.S. Eliot's Life and Works
- "Translator As An Artist", A Dialogue With Vazrik Darsahakian
- Derakht Neshin, "Records of Zahra Movasagh
- In Memory of Gholam Hossein Saedi, Distinguished Iranian Writer and Dramatist
- Medad News, "Concerning Authenticity & Literature", October 6, 2007
