= Gholamhossein Saber =

Iranian painter (born 1941)

- غلامحسین صابر
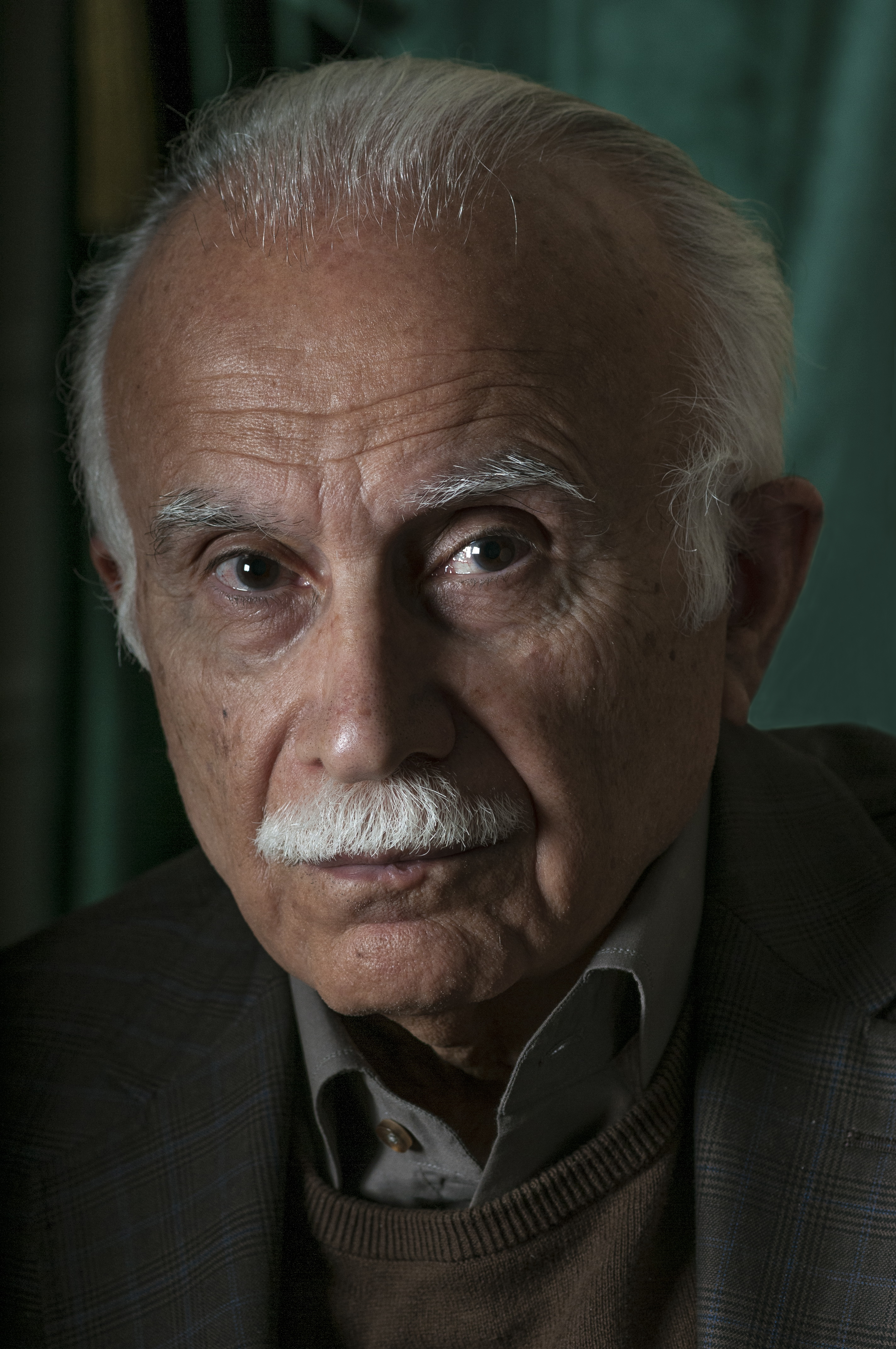
- Saber in 2018
- Born: 20 December 1941 (age 84); Shiraz, Iran
- Education: Bachelor of Arts in History and Geography
- Alma mater: Shiraz University
- Known for: Painting, photography, teaching art
- Style: Realism, expressionism, impressionism, post-impressionism
- Spouse: Zahra Entezari
- Children: Nima Saber, Omid Saber

Gholamhossein Saber (Persian: غلامحسین صابر; born 1941) is an Iranian artist known for painting, photography, and teaching art. Saber's art spans a wide range of styles from Realism and Expressionism to Impressionism and Post-Impressionism. His primary subject matters are portraits, mostly of ordinary people, and Impressionist landscapes from southern Iran.

== Early life and education ==
Saber was born in 1941 in Shiraz, Iran, to Mohammad Hassan and Rezvan Saber. His great-grandfather, Mirza Mehdi Saber, who was contemporary with Mohammad Shah Qajar and Naser al-Din Shah Qajar, was a poet and a calligrapher. Saber's talent and interest in painting was noticed by his school teachers from an early age. While still in grade 10, he was convinced he wanted to become an artist. At the suggestion of his sister, he enrolled in weekly private lessons with Khalil Negargar, a Shirazi painter indirectly influenced by Kamal-ol-molk. Negargar taught him the basics of making oil paint from color pigments, building canvases, and copying from the old masters' works, a common practice among the painters of that period in Iran. He also recounted stories about the great painters, particularly Raphael, Titian, and Rembrandt, inspiring the young student and further fanning the flames of his passion for art. In a group exhibition of students works, where Saber had submitted a copy of a portrait by Repin, he met Jahangir Mehraban-poor, a medical student and a friend of Saber's sister. Jahangir was a well-read person, knew English, and painted in his free time. Jahangir told Saber that copying was a waste of time and encouraged him to draw and paint from real life and the people on the street. The two became friends and started going out for live sketches.

In 1960, after finishing high school, Saber was admitted to the History and Geography Bachelor's program in the Faculty of Literature of the Shiraz University. The university's scholarly and innovative environment offered him a broader and deeper perspective of the world. He made new friends among the university students, discovered writers he didn't know about before, and got familiar with classical music. Starting in 1960, the University of Pennsylvania was assisting the Iranian government in modernizing Pahlavi University based on American-style higher education. Consequently, the university's central library was going through a major upgrade, acquiring large collections of English books, including a large number of books on visual arts. Saber spent a lot of time in the library, studying the works of the old masters. Gradually, he became acquainted and fascinated with the Impressionists, particularly Monet, and Camille Pissarro.

Saber graduated with a B.A. in History and Geography in 1964. The next year he completed a one-year program at the Tehran Teacher Training University (later renamed to Kharazmi University) to qualify for employment by the Ministry of Education.

== Career ==
Upon completion of the program in 1965, he was hired as a high school teacher by the Ministry of Education and was transferred to Khoramshahr, a small inland port city on the eastern shore of the Karoun river. The three years he spent in Khorramshahr were very critical in his career development as an Impressionist artist. At the same time, the paintings from that period have a strong Realistic and Expressionist bent and reflect the struggles and the sufferings of the people within the vast and rich landscapes of the South.

In 1968, he was transferred to his hometown, Shiraz, and started teaching art, history, and geography at Mehrayeen and Shapoor high schools. He continued painting in his free time. As in the Khorramshahr years, his early Shiraz works, especially his portraits, with darker colors and strong brush strokes, had a certain Expressionistic look. Starting with mid-seventies, he gradually abandoned that approach. His colors become more vivid and he developed a refined, Pre-Raphaelite-like, style, while employing an Impressionist palette. During the eighties, this disposition towards more vivid and pure colors continues and solidifies into a unique Impressionist and Pointillist style owed as much to the blazing Sun and the dazzling sky of the Fars province.

== Teaching art ==
In October 1968, the Ministry of Arts and Culture opened a cultural center on Ferdowsi street in Shiraz. The general director of the ministry in the Fars province, Nasser Kojoori, asked Saber to join as the painting instructor. The center was called the House of Culture Number One (Persian: خانه فرهنگ شماره یک). This was the beginning of Saber's secondary arts-related career as a painting teacher. Anyone who showed interest in painting could join the classes. Apart from drawing and painting techniques, the classes included art theory and art history sessions, as well as casual talks and discussions on literature, photography, cinema, and classical music. For 32 years Saber trained hundreds of students, many of whom have become accomplished artists and art instructors. In 2000, Saber retired from teaching at the public center and with his wife Zahra Entezari opened the Ofogh private art school. He continued teaching there for almost 20 years.

== Photography ==
Saber became familiar with photography when he was a university student. Initially encouraged by Yeprem Artonians, aka Monsieur George, who ran a photography studio in Shiraz, he gradually became more vested in photography, following it with the same dedication as he did painting. The subjects of his photographs, similar to his paintings, range from still lives to portraits and countryside landscapes. In 2003 he had a show of his photographs in the Sabz Gallery in Tehran.

== Awards and recognition ==
Commemorating Gholamhossein Saber, Shiraz, 2019

Saber was born and lived the first 60 years of his life in a 200-year old heritage building in a historic neighborhood in Shiraz. In 2001, the Fars provincial government purchased this house and 20 of Saber's works in order to turn it into a museum. In 2003 a ceremony was held and the museum was officially opened to the public. Unfortunately this did not last long and within a few years the works were moved to an unknown location and the museum was closed.

In the Spring of 2005, the Meshkinfam Art Museum in Shiraz held a retrospective of Saber's works in recognition of his lifetime contributions to Shiraz' art.

In 2019, an official ceremony was held by the Ministry of Islamic Culture and the City of Shiraz to honor Saber's contribution to the Fars province's art and culture. This coincided with unveiling the book on Saber's selected works, "A Paradise of Light and Color", and a postal stamp in the artist's commemoration.

== Early works ==
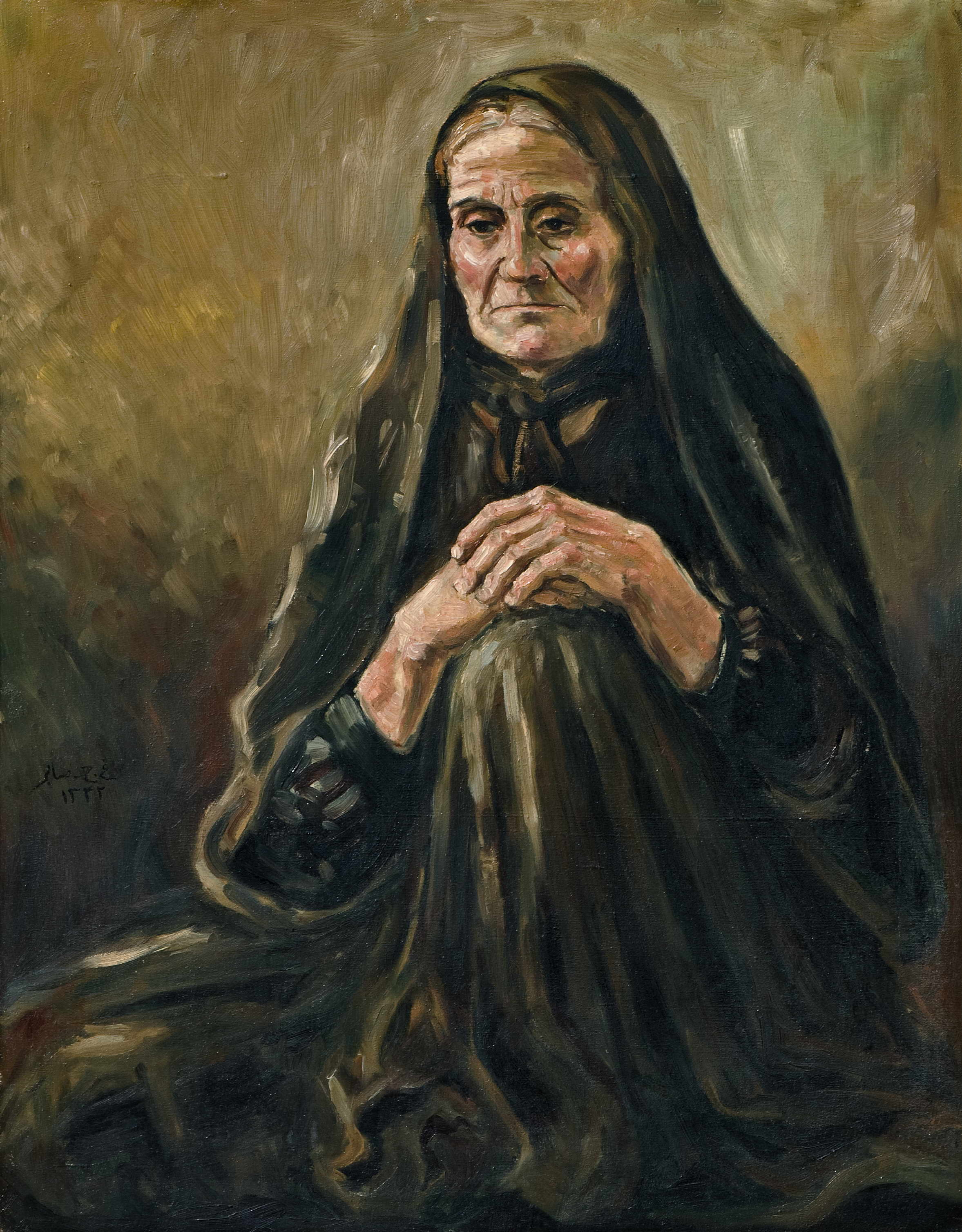
Old Woman, 1963, Oil on canvas

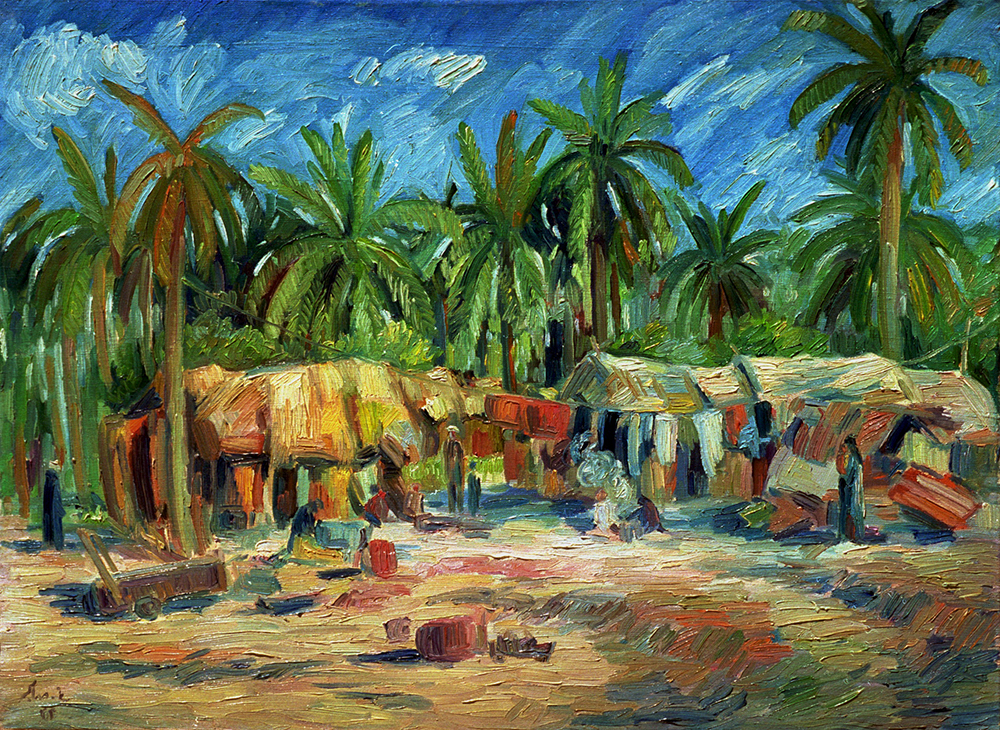
Villagers Huts in Khoramshahr, 1965, Oil on canvas

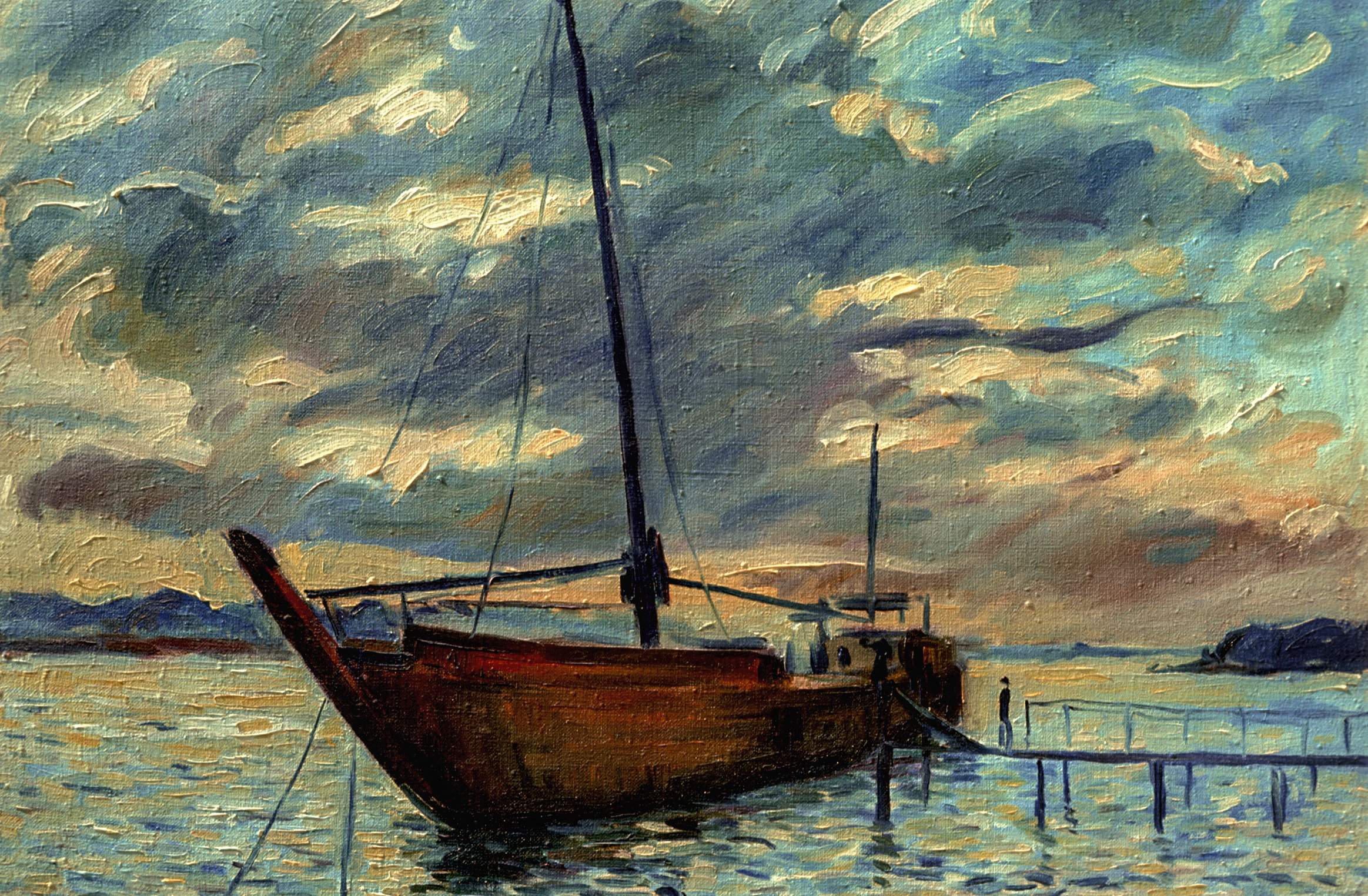
Boat on Karun, 1966, Oil on canvas

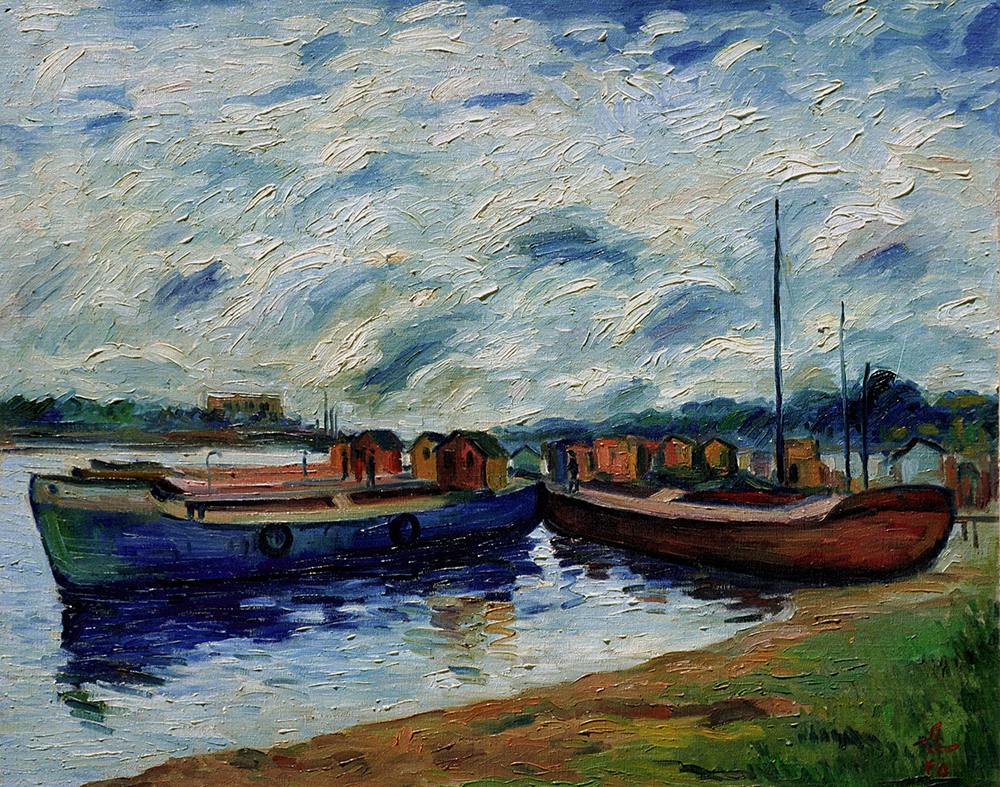
Boats on Karun, 1966, Oil on canvas

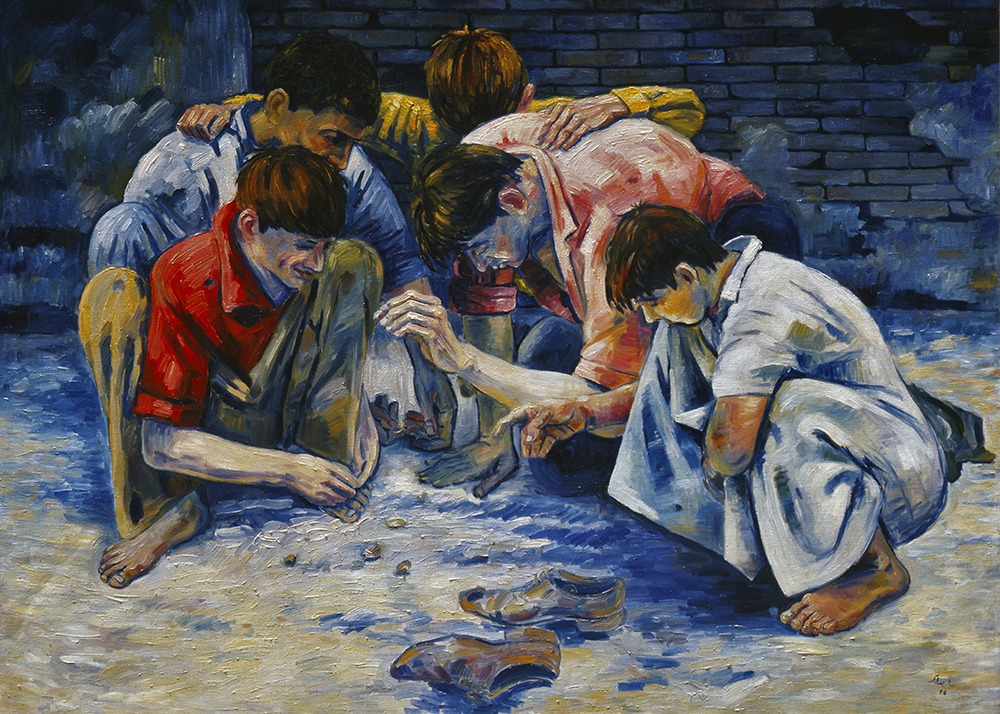
The Gamblers, 1966, Oil on canvas

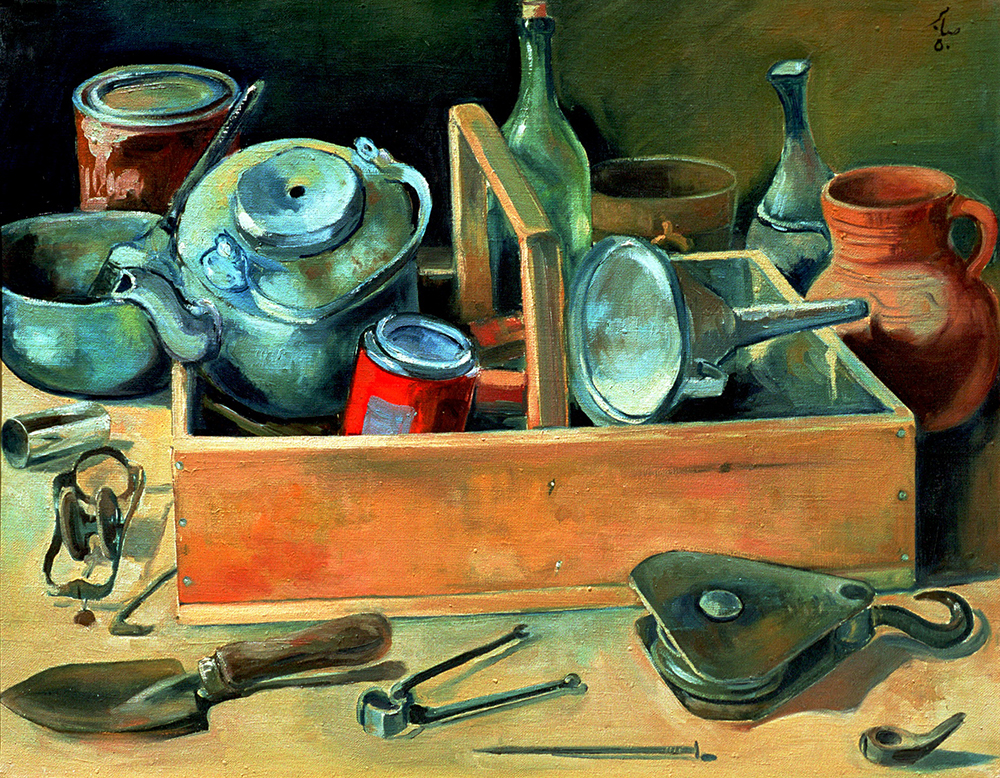
Still Life, 1971, Oil on canvas

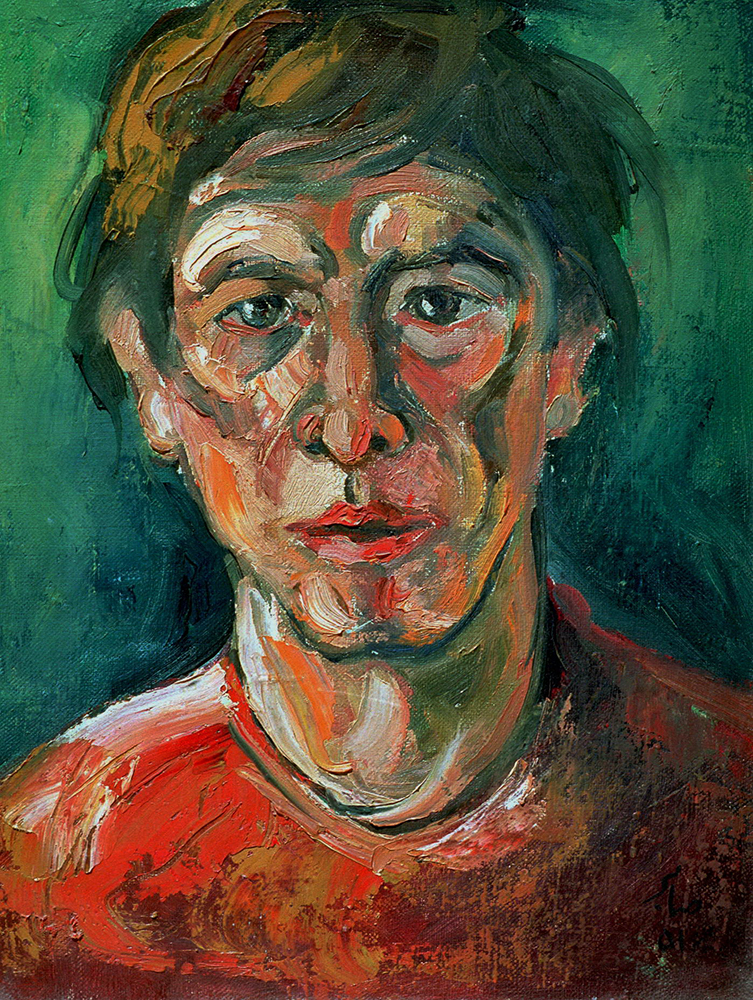
Madman, 1972, Oil on canvas

== Impressionist works ==
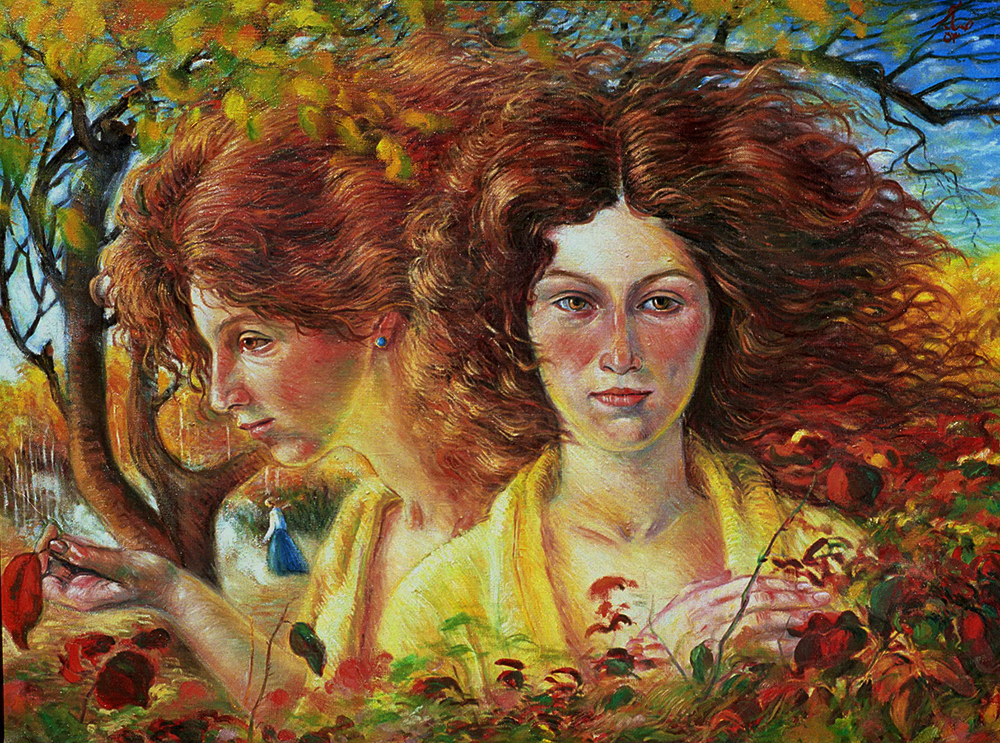
Sara, 1975, Oil on canvas

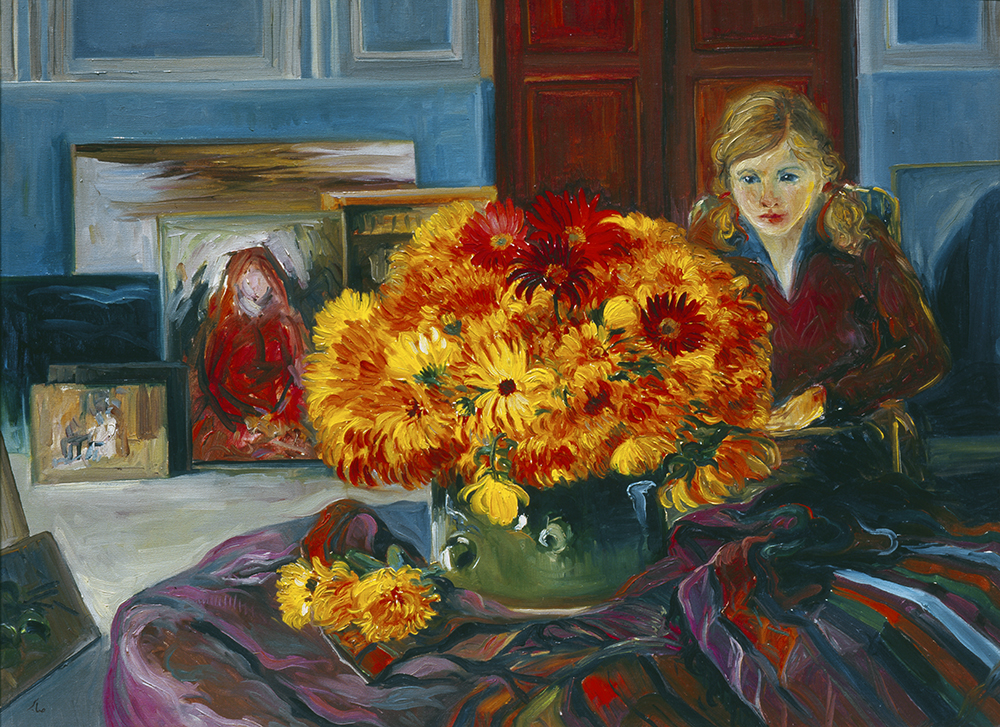
Girl in the Studio, 1976, Oil on canvas

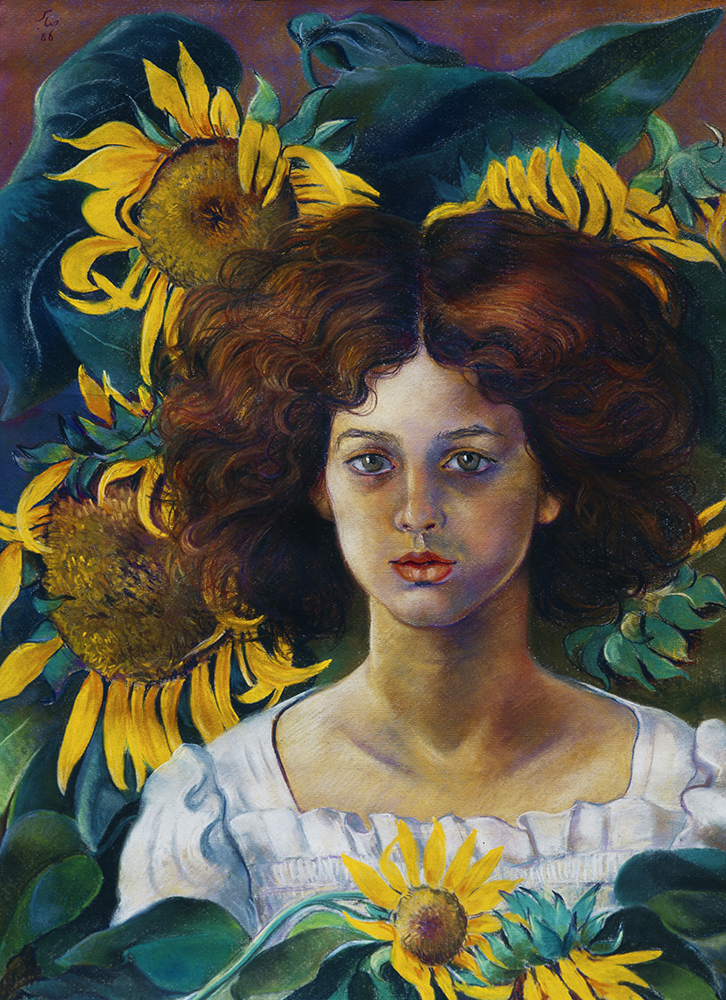
Rokhsareh, 1976, Pastels

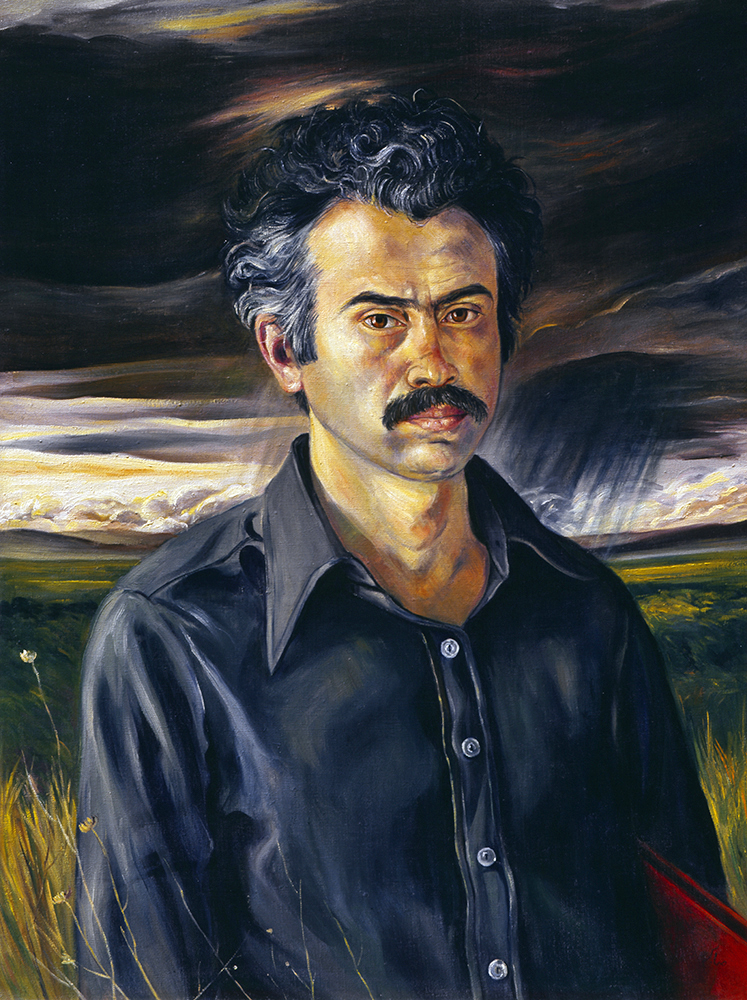
Self Portrait, 1977, Oil on canvas

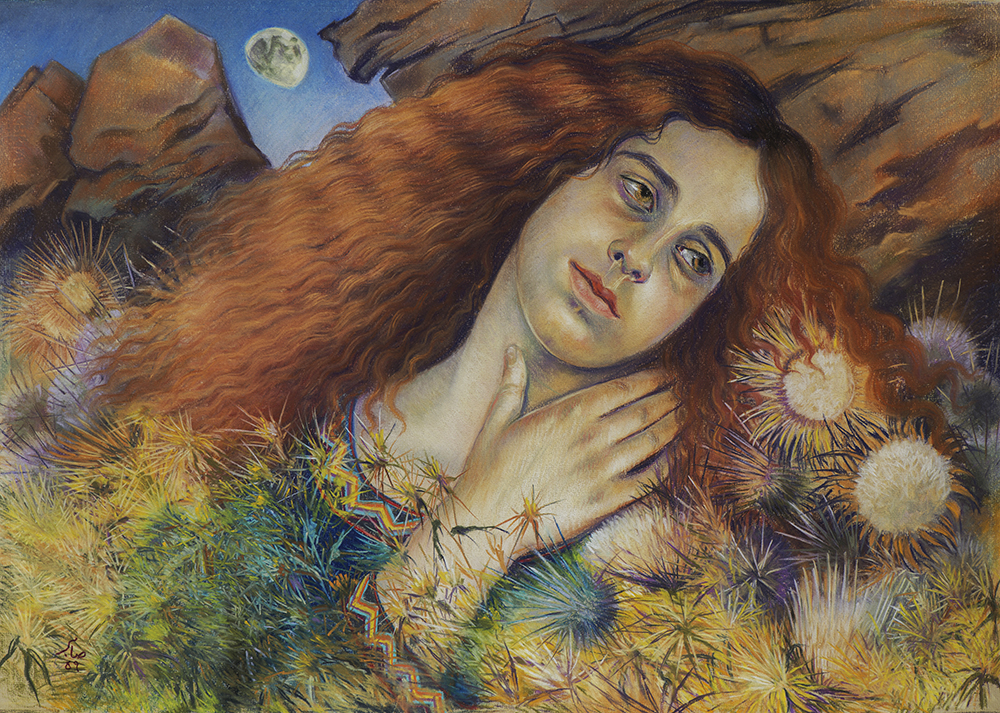
Thorns, 1980, Oil on canvas

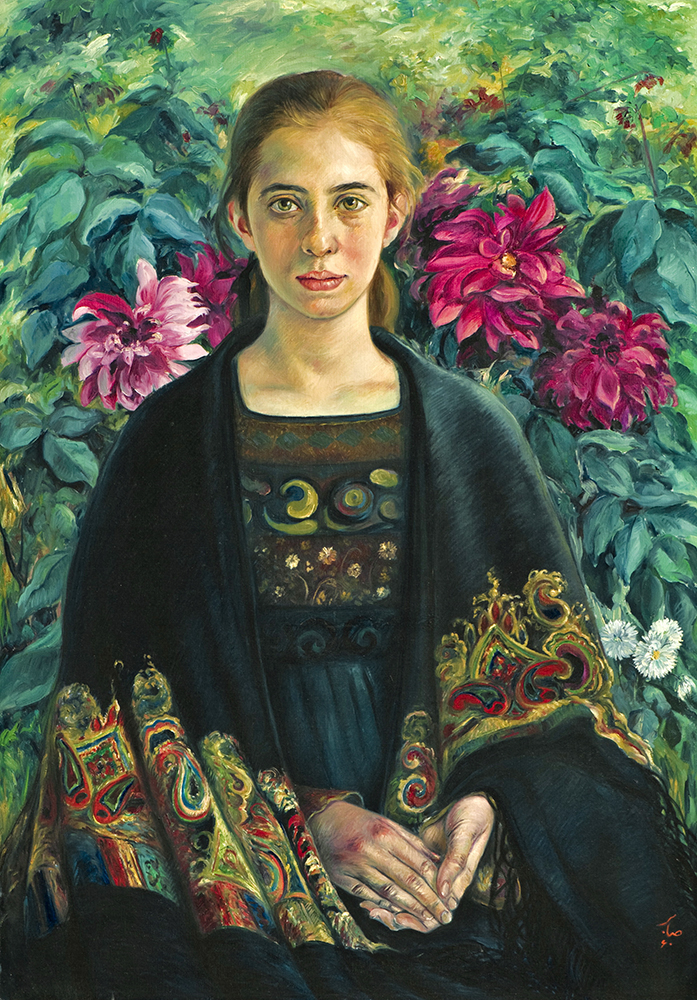
Zahra, 1981, Oil on canvas

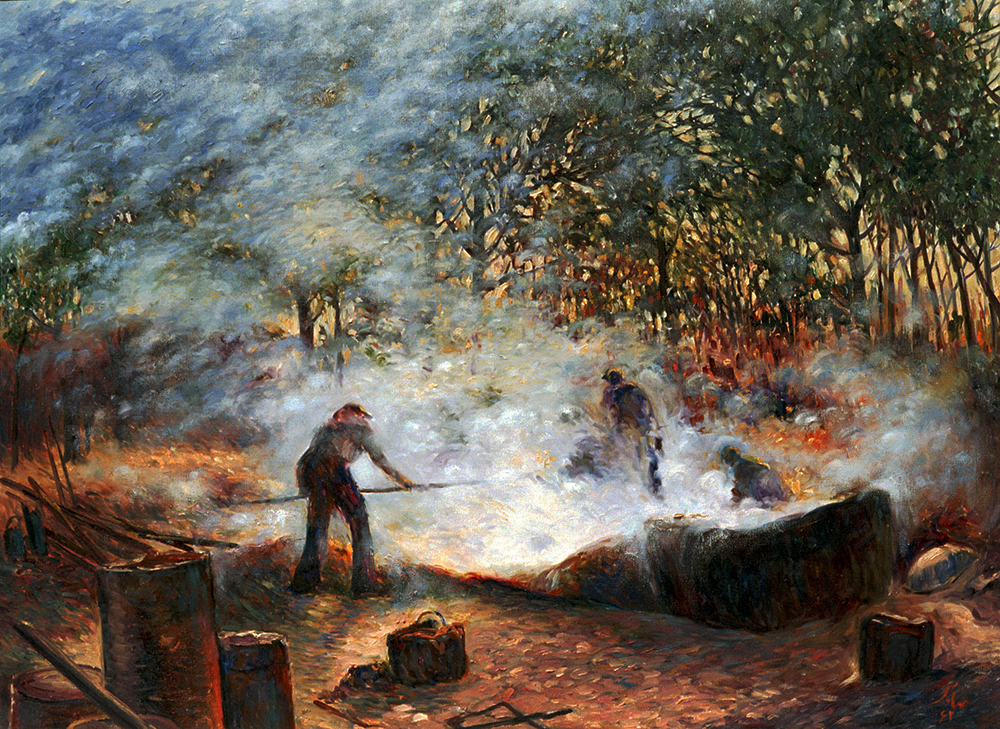
Asphalt Workers, 1983, Oil on canvas

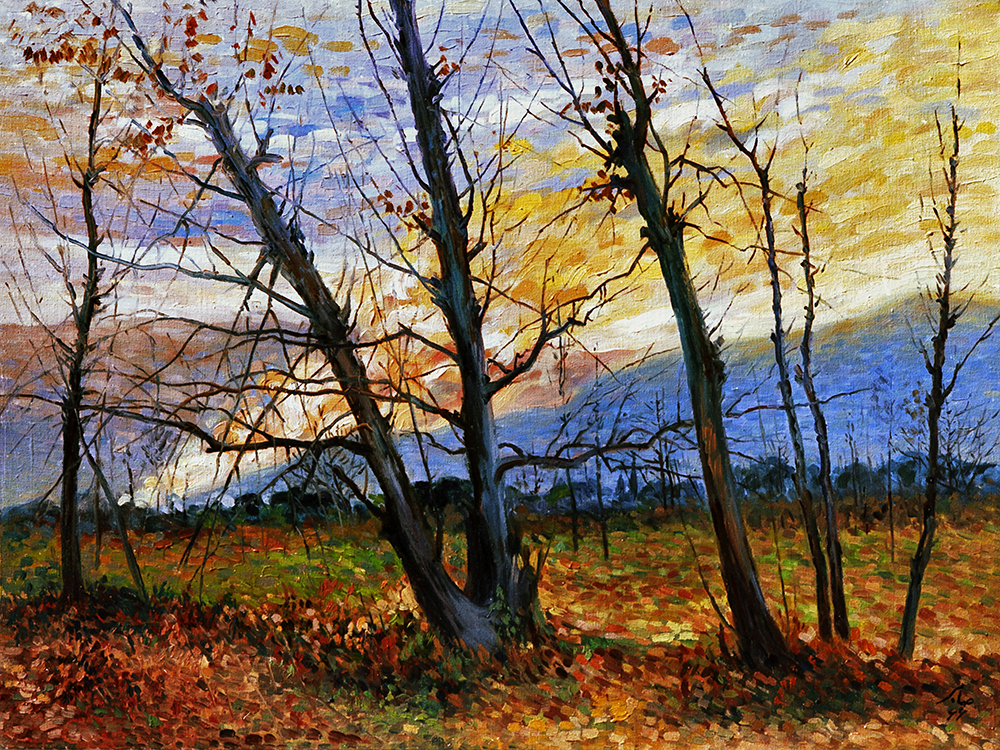
Sunset, 1984, Oil on canvas

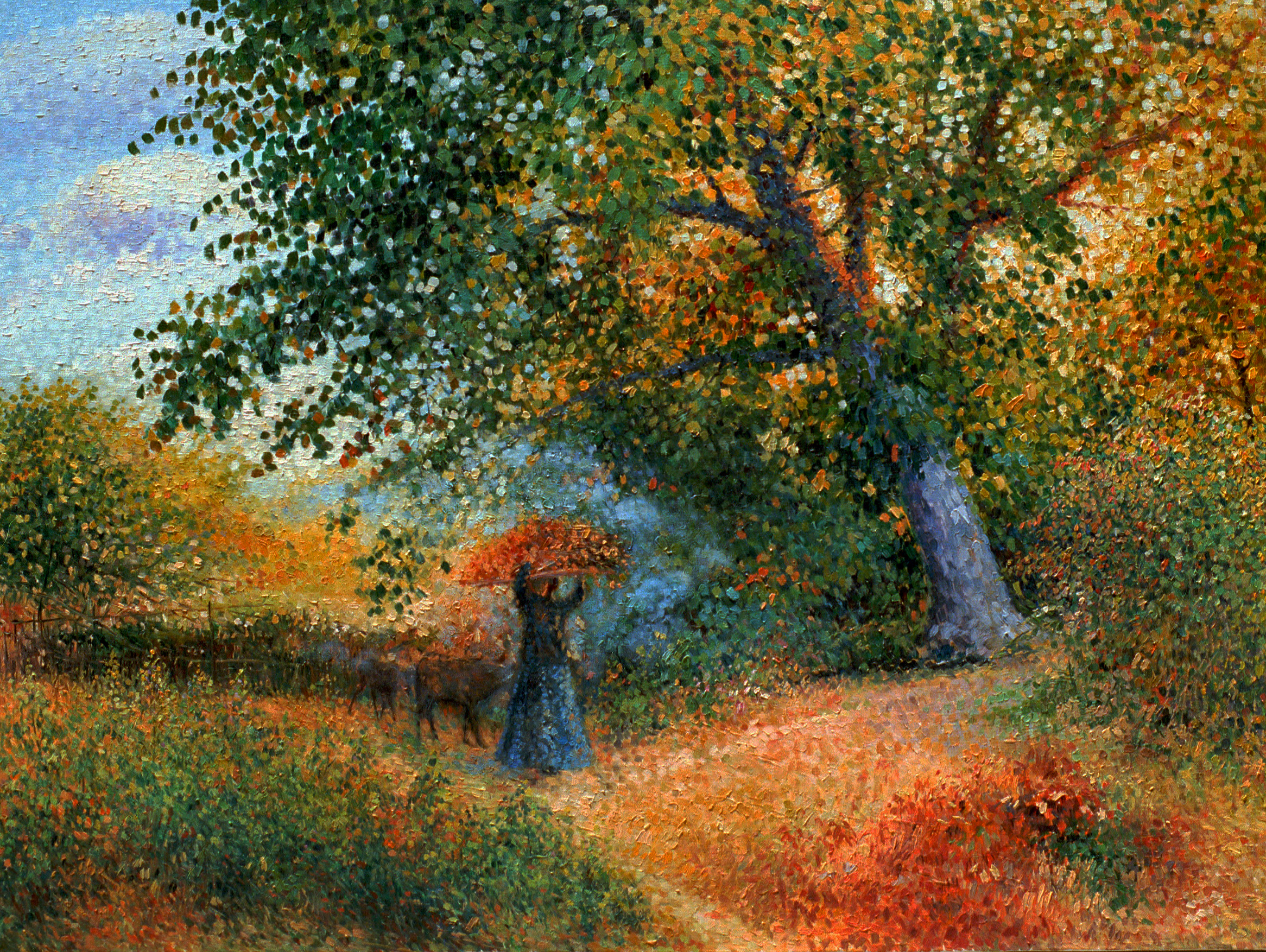
In the Garden, 1986, Oil on canvas

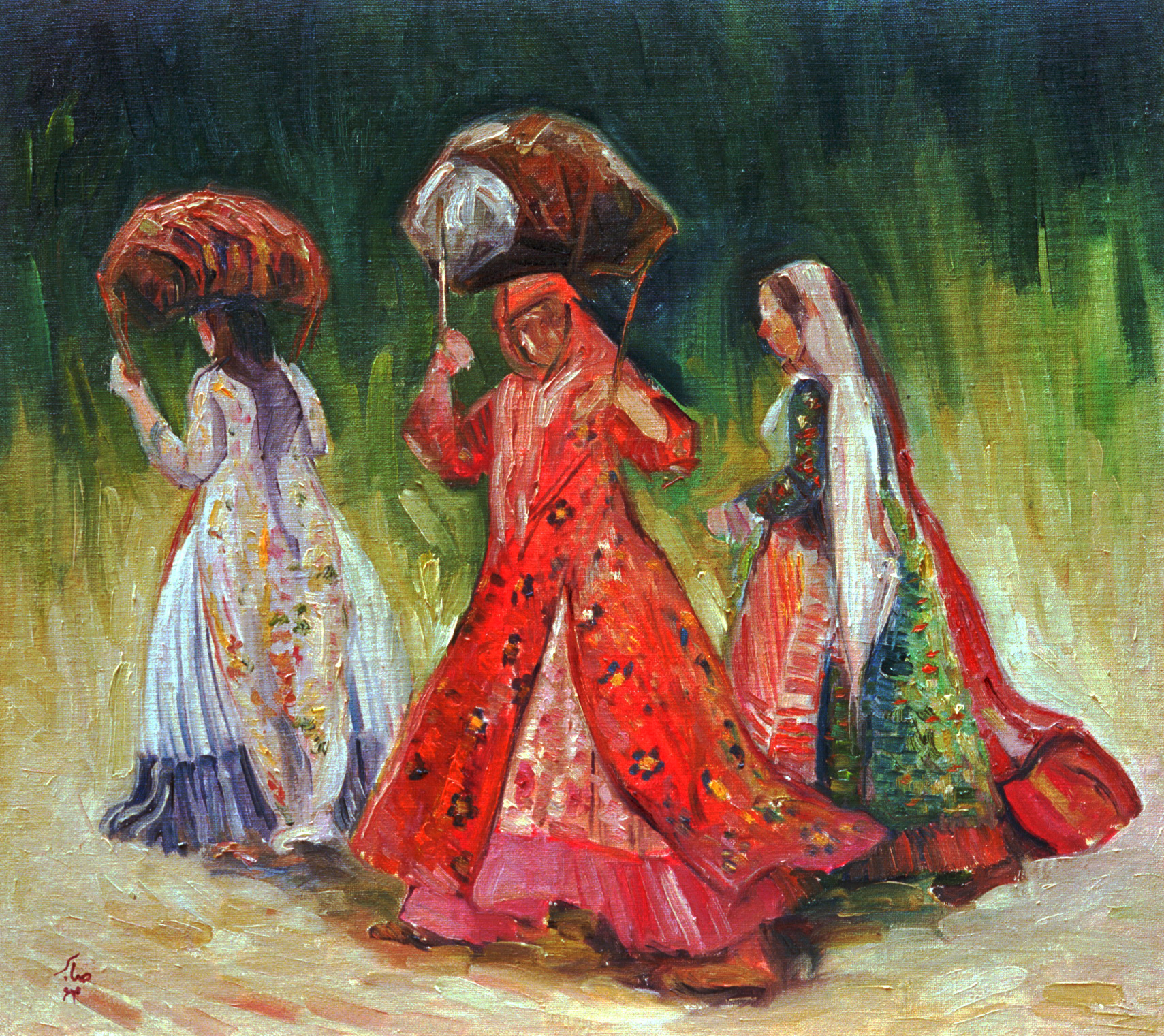
Nomad Women, 1987, Oil on canvas

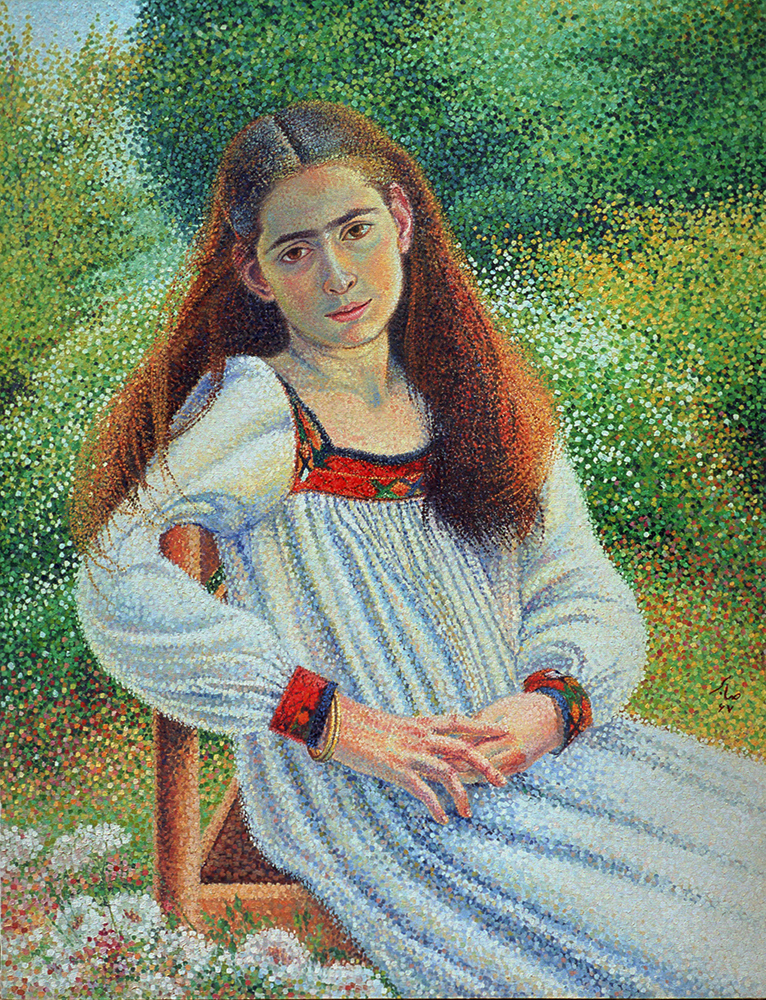
Leila, 1988, Oil on canvas

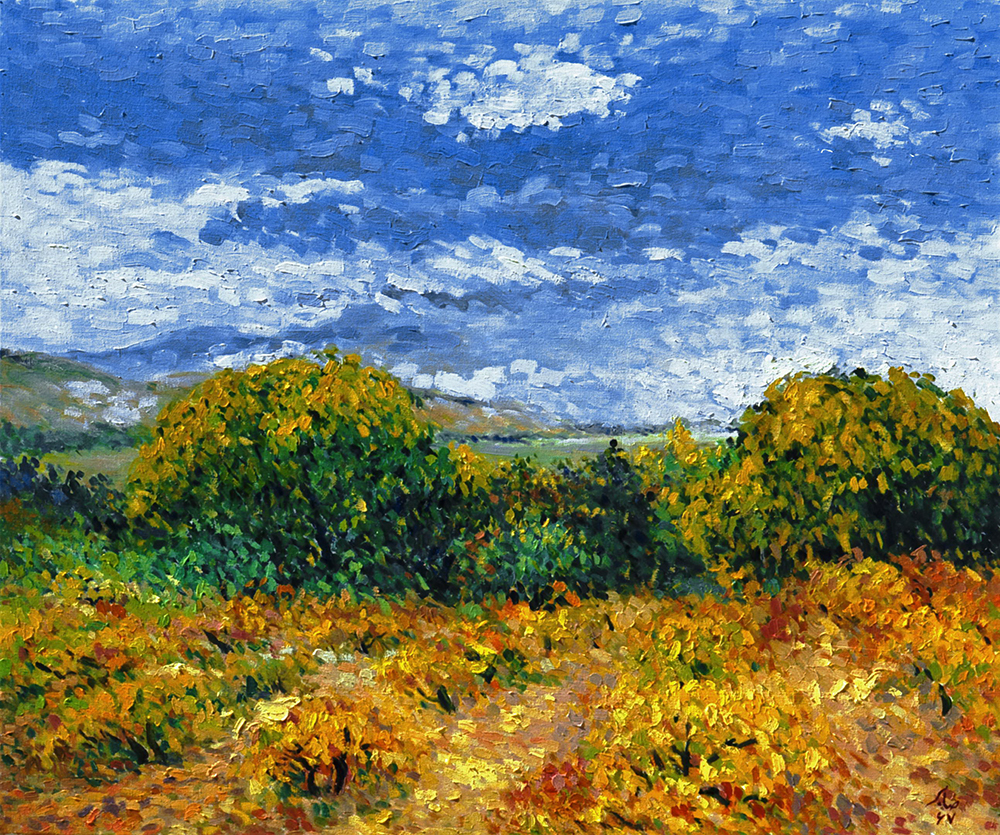
Posht-e-Moleh, 1988, Oil on canvas

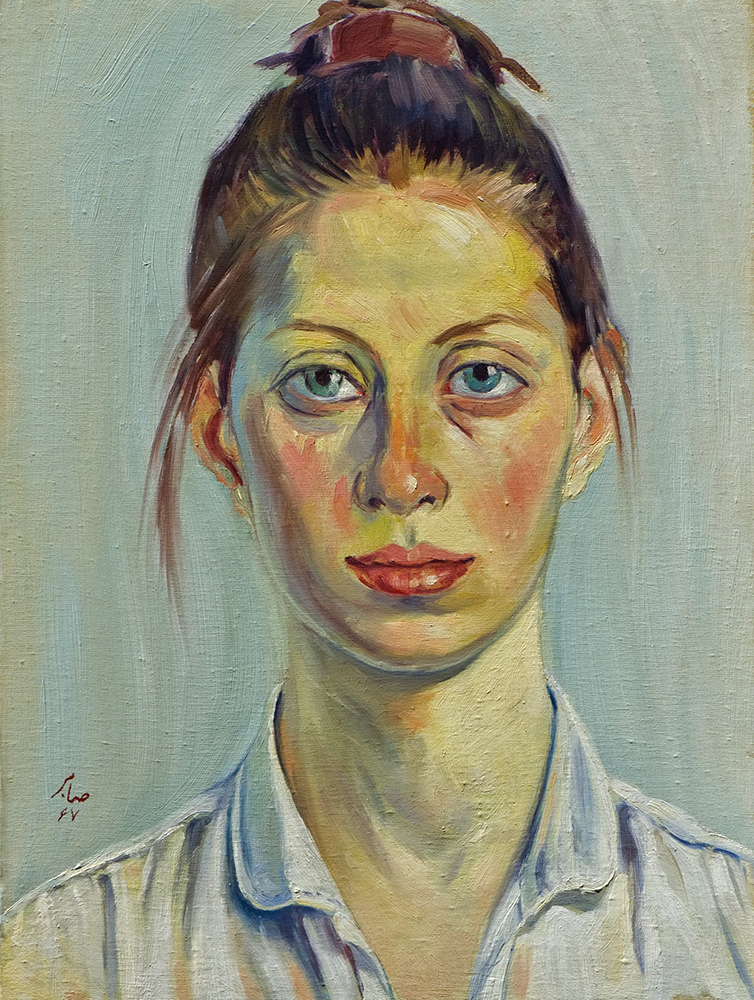
Portrait of Zahra, 1988, Oil on canvas

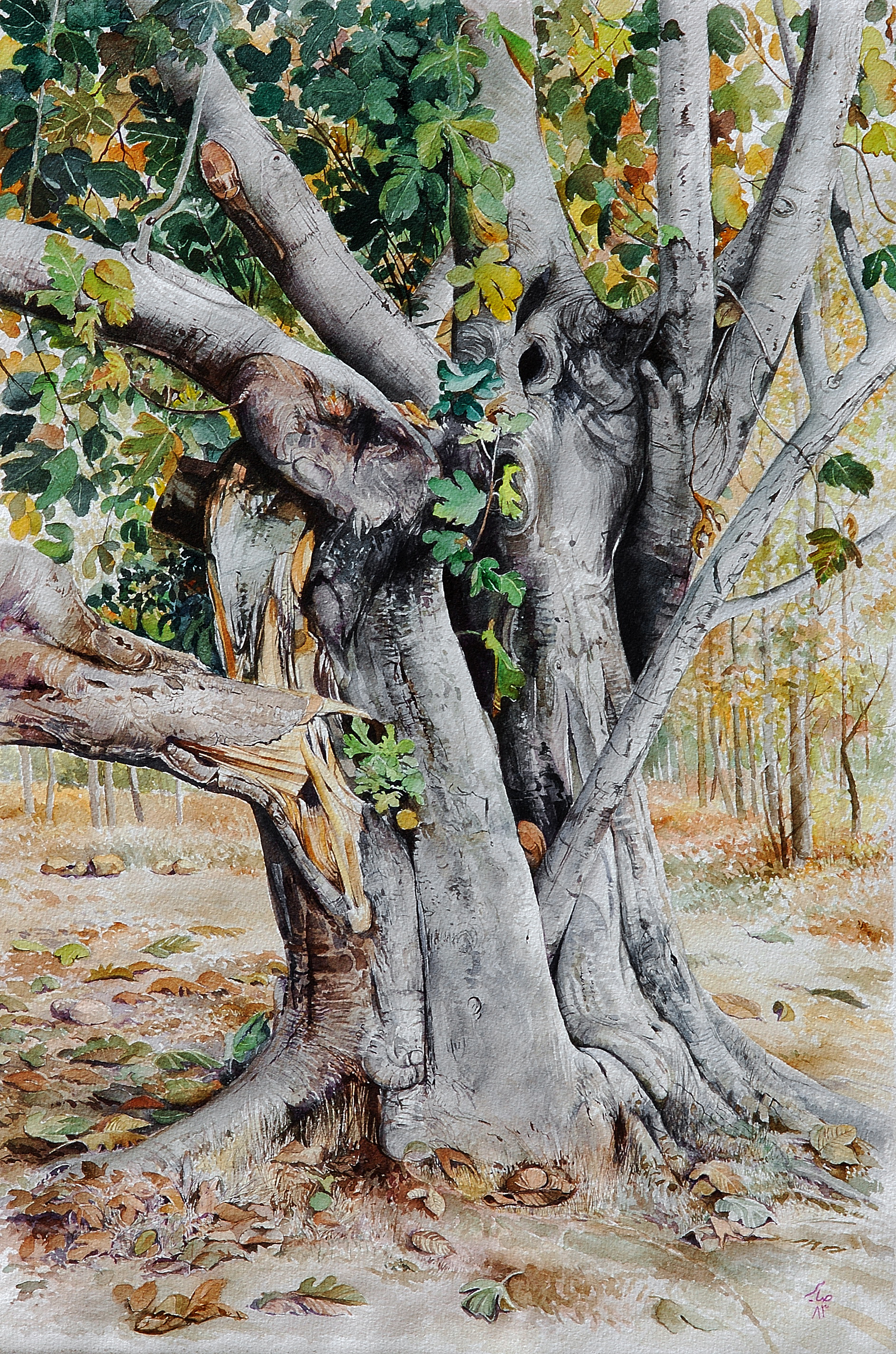
Fig Tree, 2004, Watercolor

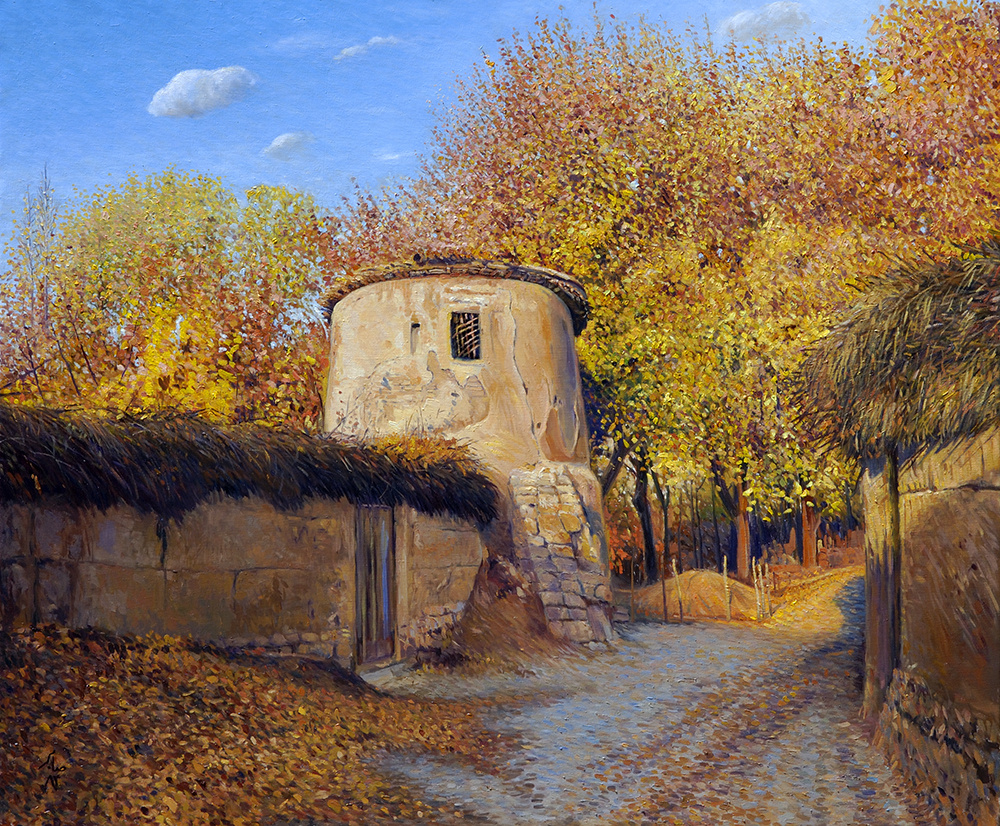
Autumn, 2005, Oil on canvas

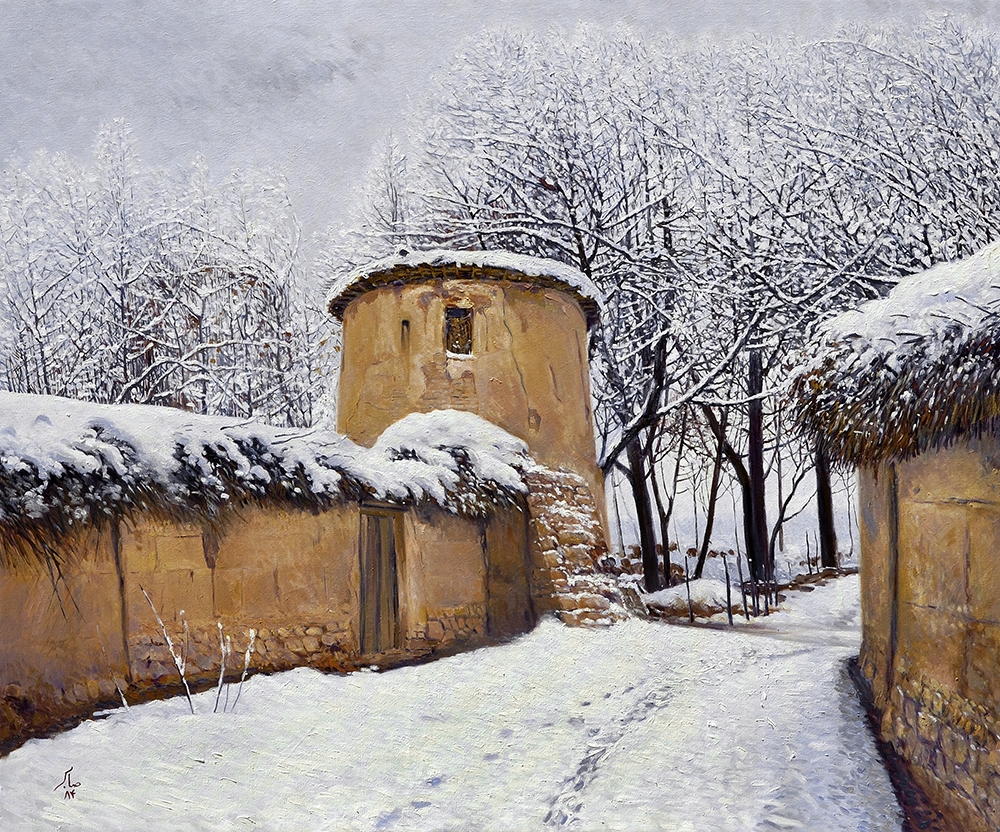
Winter, 2005, Oil on canvas

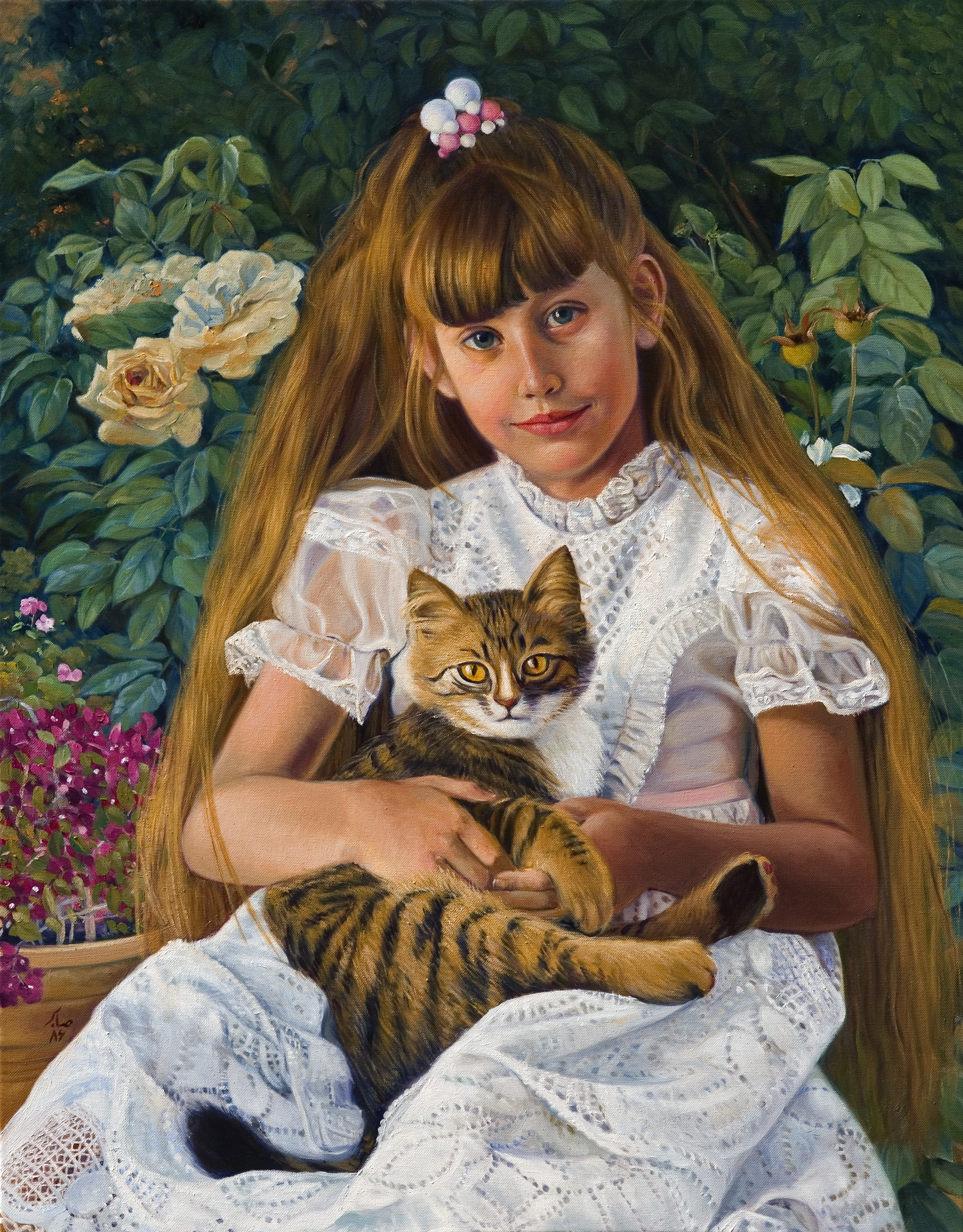
Leila K. 2007, Oil on canvas

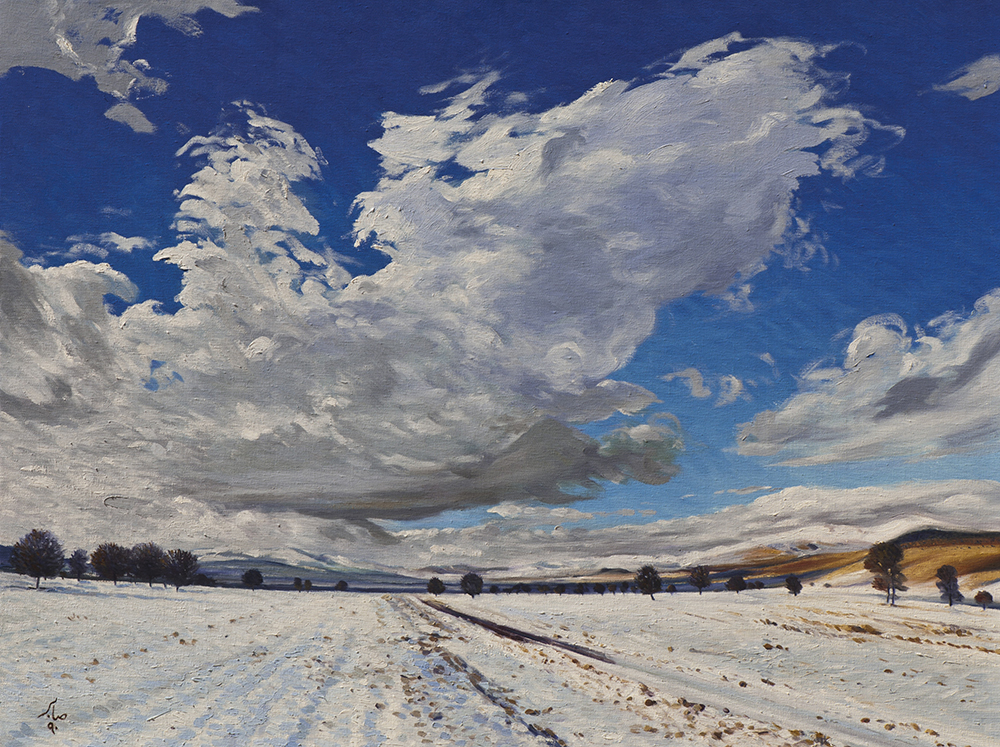
A Landscape, 2011, Oil on canvas

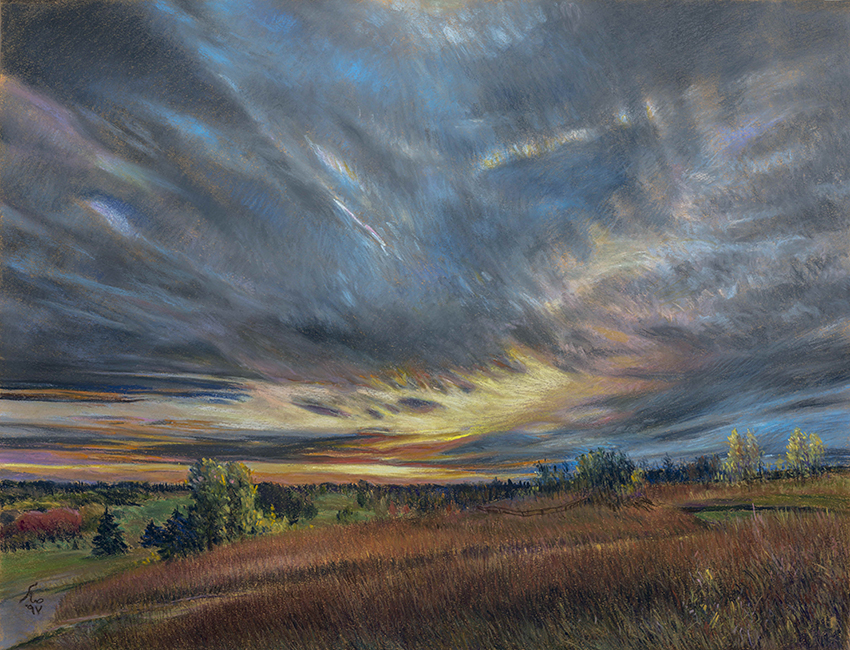
North West Landscape, 2019, Pastels

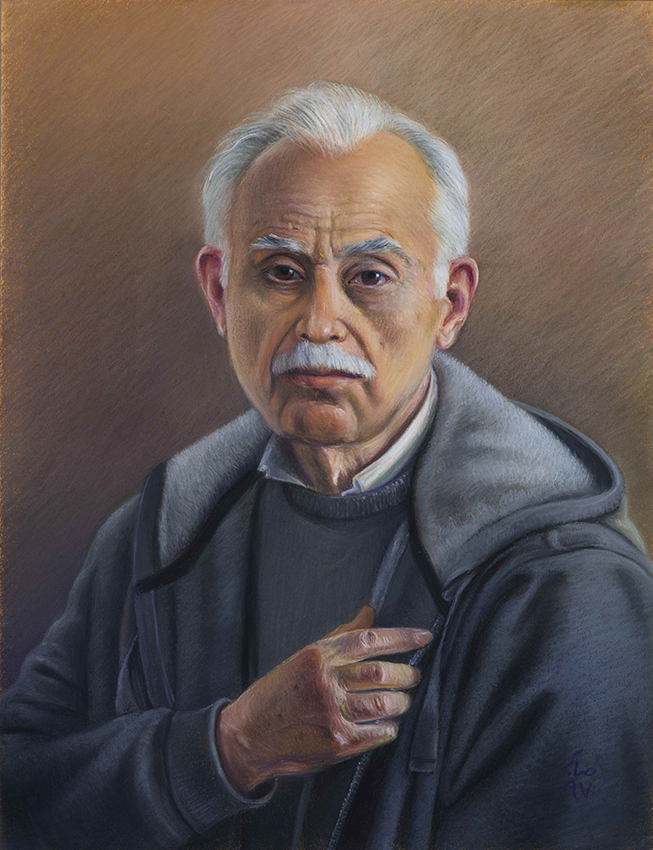
Self Portrait, 2019, Pastels

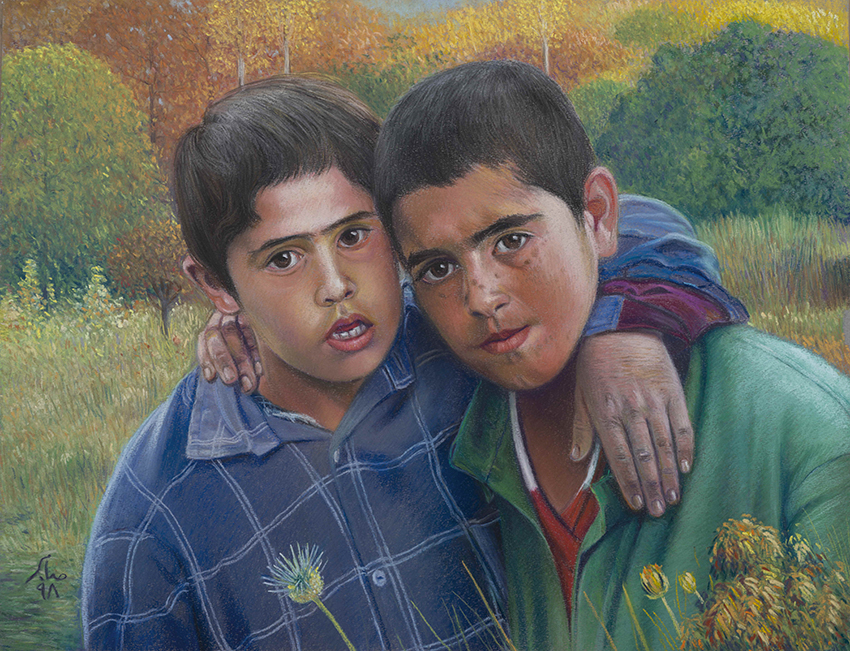
Country Kids, 2020, Pastels

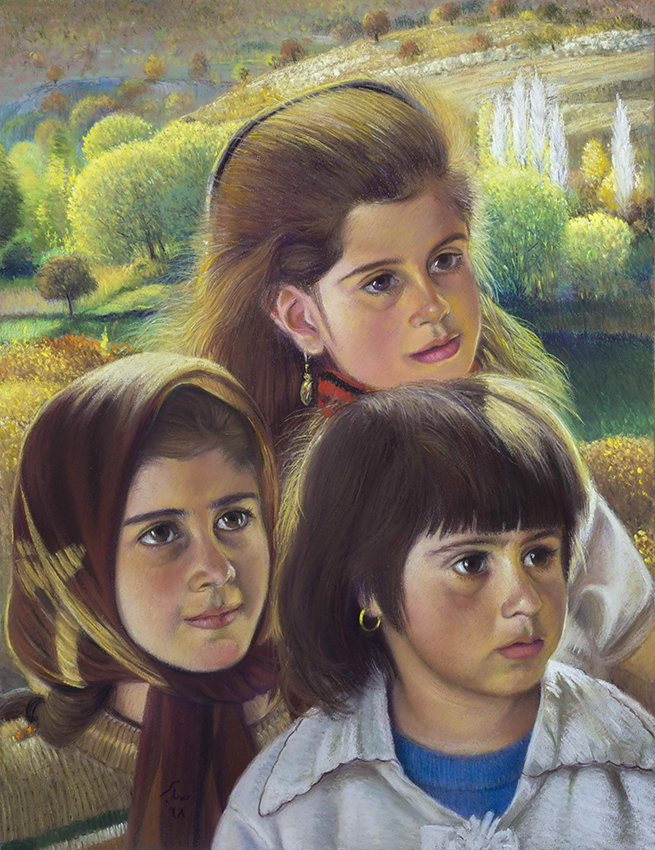
Country Girls, 2020, Pastels

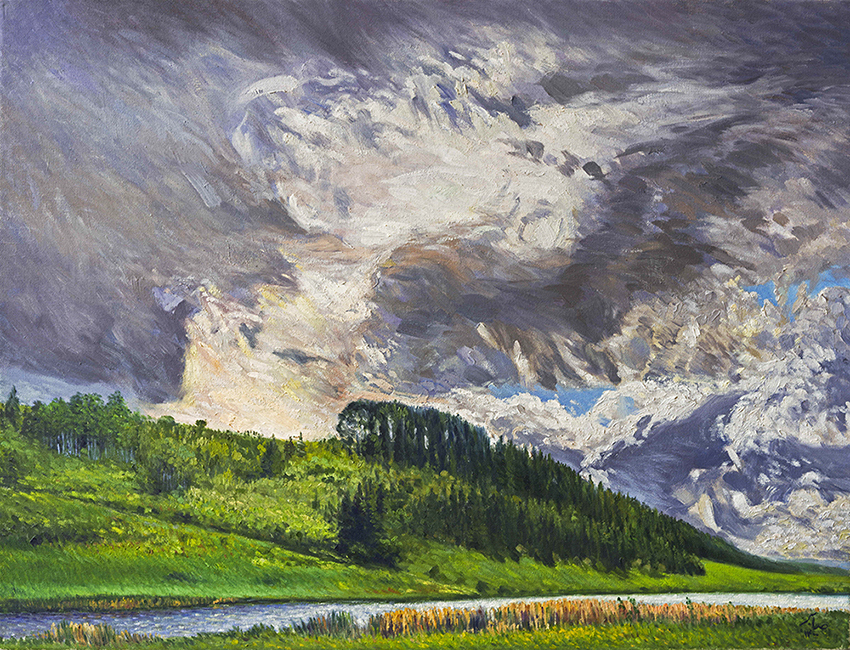
Stormy Clouds, Calgary, 2021, Oil on canvas

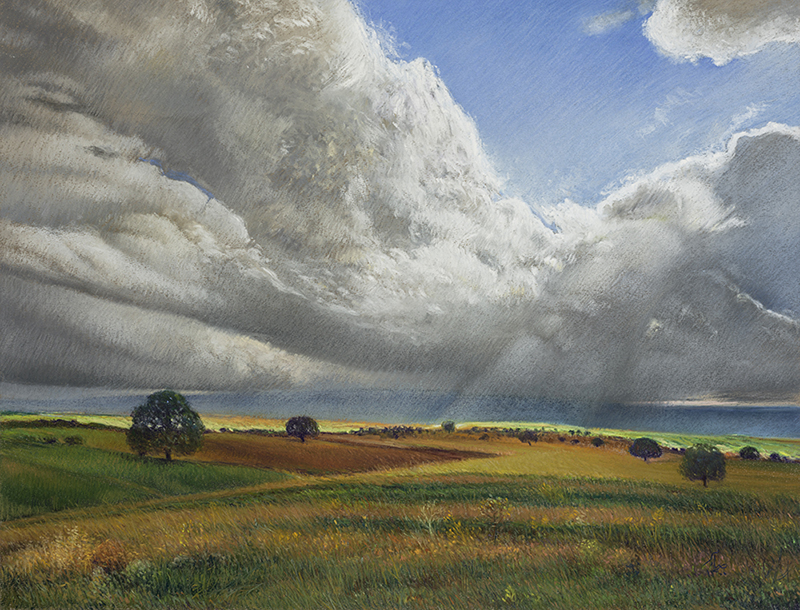
Doshman-Ziyari, 2021, Pastels

== Exhibitions ==
- Vesal Gallery, Shiraz, Iran, 2019
- Meshkinfam Art Museum, Shiraz, Iran, 2005
- Sabz Gallery, Tehran, Iran, 1997
- Seyhoun Art Gallery, Tehran, Iran, 1983
- Group show at Sheikh Art Gallery, Tehran, 1977
- Vesal Art Gallery, Shiraz, 1977
- Vesal Art Gallery, Shiraz, 1975
- Exhibition at Faculty of Literature in Shiraz University, Shiraz, 1963
