= Linguistics Society of Iran =

Academic society in Iran

The Linguistics Society of Iran (LSI) (Persian: انجمن زبان‌شناسی ایران) was founded in 2001 in Tehran, Iran and recognized as an academic society by the Iranian Ministry of Science, Research and Technology in 2004. Its objectives and activities include promotion of linguistic and cultural researches, collaboration with science and research centers in projects related to linguistics and language studies, providing educational, research and technical services at national and international levels, organizing and hosting local, regional, and world conferences, and publication of books, journals and newsletters.

== Departments ==
LSI has fifteen specialized departments:

- Dept. of Phonetics and Phonology
- Dept. of Translation Studies
- Dept. of Sociolinguistics and ethnolinguistics
- Dept. of Psycholinguistics and Neurolinguistics
- Dept. of Computational Linguistics
- Dept. of Applied Linguistics
- Dept. of Morphology
- Dept. of Lexicography
- Dept. of Philosophy of Language and Formal Logics
- Dept. of Dialectology
- Dept. of Historical Studies of the Iranian Languages and Mythology
- Dept. of Theoretical and Applied Semantics
- Dept. of Syntax and Language Typology
- Dept. of Semiotics and Literary Studies
- Dept. of Terminology
