= Ali Ravaghi =

Iranian academic (b. 1941)

Ali Ravaghi (Persian: علی رواقی; born 29 November 1941, in Mashhad, Iran) is a Persian literature master, professor emeritus, Qur'an researcher, and a member of the Academy of Persian Language and Literature.
