= Mohsen Adeli =

Iranian chemist

- محسن عادلی
- Born: June 30, 1972; Khorramabad
- Education: Sharif University of Technology (Postdoc), University of Tabriz (PhD, MSc), Lorestan University (BS)
- Known for: works on polymer chemistry
- Scientific career
- Fields: chemistry
- Institutions: Lorestan University; Free University of Berlin
- Thesis: Synthesis of the dendritic supramolecules and their applications as nanocarrier agents (2005)
- Doctoral advisor: Hassan Namazi
- Other academic advisors: Rainer Haag; Ali Akbar Entezami

Mohsen Adeli (born 20 March 1972) is an Iranian chemist and Distinguished Professor of Chemistry at Lorestan University and guest professor at the Free University of Berlin. He is known for his research in the field of macromolecular chemistry, nanomaterials and materials chemistry.

== Career ==
After high school in Khorramabad, where he graduated in 1992, he studied Pure Chemistry at Lorestan University 1993-1997. He received his MSc in Organic Chemistry in 2001 under supervision of Aliakbar Entezami, and subsequently his PhD in the same field under supervision of Hasan Namazi in 2005 at Tabriz University. Adeli graduated with his thesis entitled Synthesis of citric acid dendrimers and their application as drug delivery agents. He received a research fellowship in the Department of Chemistry at Dortmund University under Rainer Haag in 2005. Then in 2007 he joined Sharif University of Technology Institute of Science and Nanotechnology as a postdoctoral researcher. Since 2014, he has been a visiting professor at the Free University of Berlin.

Adeli’s multidisciplinary research focuses on organic chemistry, polymer science and nanomedicine and addresses several innovative subjects such synthesis of new polymeric architectures and investigation of their physicochemical properties as well as their applications in the field of nanomedicine. An understanding of the mechanism of in plane polymerizations and their properties at biointerfaces has resulted in development of new antimicrobial, antiviral, anticancer and wound healing therapeutics. He is developing new methods for the construction of organic frameworks.
