= Entezami =

Entezami (Persian: انتظامی, adjective form of Persian/Arabic انتظام (intiẓām) meaning "discipline", "order") is a Persian surname and may refer to:

- Ali Akbar Entezami (1943–2015), Iranian chemist
- Ezzatolah Entezami (1924–2018), Iranian actor
- Majid Entezami (born 1948), Iranian musician, composer, conductor, and oboist

== See also ==
- Entezam
