= Servatian =

Servatian (Persian: ثروتیان) is an Iranian surname and may refer to:

- Behrouz Servatian (1937–2012), Iranian literary scholar and university professor
- Golnar Servatian (born 1977), Iranian cartoonist and book illustrator, Behrouz' daughter
