= Lorestan University =

Iranian research university

- دانشگاه لرستان
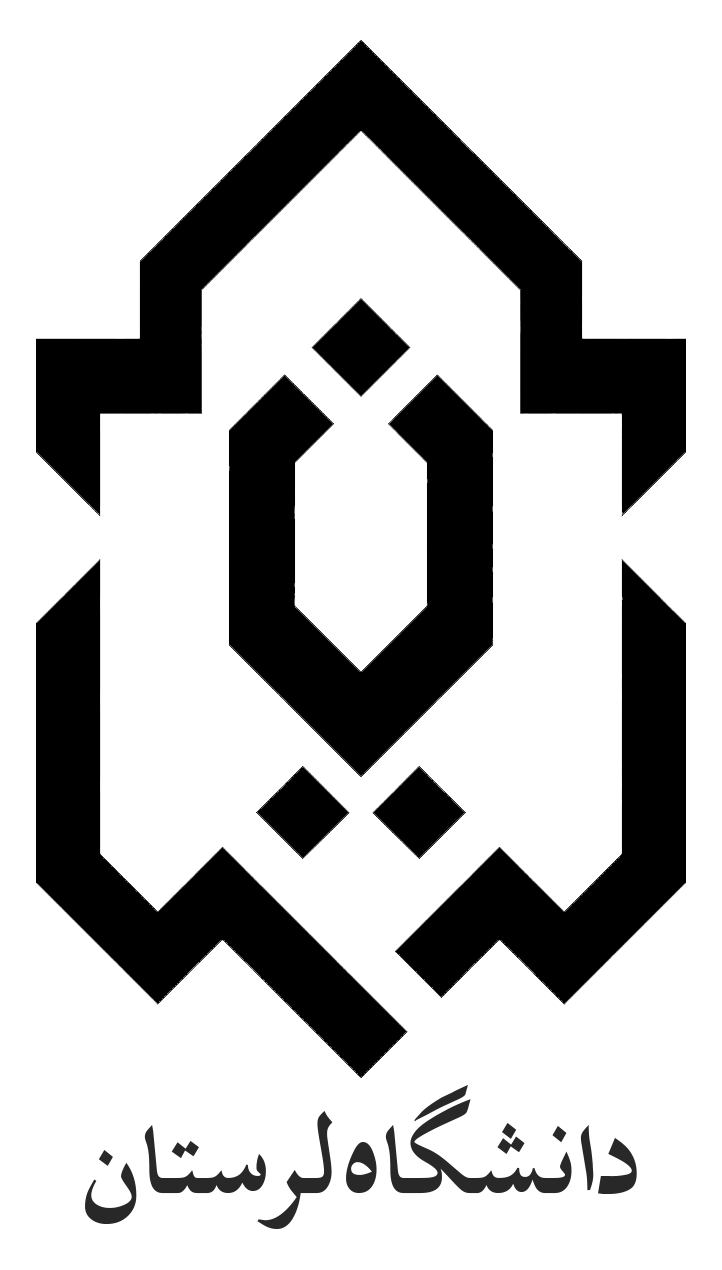
- Former name: Lorestan Higher Education Center
- Type: Public research university
- Established: 1977; 49 years ago
- Budget: 5080 billion rials (2024)
- President: Mehrdad Dadsetani
- Academic staff: 405
- Students: 7837
- Undergraduates: 4876
- Postgraduates: 1916
- Doctoral students: 807 (PhD), 227 (ProfDoc)
- Location: Khorramabad, Lorestan, Iran; 33°28′42″N 48°25′12″E
- Campus: Urban, suburban
- Website: www.lu.ac.ir

Lorestan University (LU) (Persian: دانشگاه لرستان) (Note: Romanized as Daneshgah-e Lorestan) is a public university of science and engineering in Iran, offering undergraduate and postgraduate studies. Located in Lorestan province of Iran, the university is among the public universities and research institutes in Iran.

The university has campuses in the city of Khorramabad and smaller campuses across the province of Lorestan offering degrees in over 100 different specialties leading to B.A., B.Sc., M.A., M.Sc., D.V.M., and Ph.D. degrees.

== History ==
The university was founded in 1977 as the northerin branch of Ahvaz Jundishapur University and later became independent after the Islamic Revolution and continued its activities under the title of Lorestan Higher Education Center with four academic departments: Mathematics, Physics, Chemistry, and Biology.

In 1993 it was upgraded from a higher education center to a university.

== Campuses and buildings ==
Lorestan University currently has eight faculties: Basic Sciences, Engineering and Technology, Literature and Humanities, Economics and Administrative Sciences, Agriculture, Natural Resources, Veterinary Medicine, and Chemistry. It has four affiliated higher education centers located in the cities of Nurabad, Aleshtar, Kuhdasht, and Pol-e Dokhtar as well.

All faculties are located on the University’s central campus, except for the Faculties of Agriculture and Natural Resources, which are situated on the southern edge of the city of Khorramabad, at kilometer 11 of the Khorramabad–Andimeshk road.

The Faculty of Veterinary Medicine initially shared facilities with the Faculty of Engineering and Technology, but it is now housed in an independent building called the Mostafa Ahmadi Roshan Building. This faculty has seven specialized laboratories and one dissection hall.

The Specialized Veterinary Hospital was also established in October 2016 on the southern side of the university, with the aim of providing educational and clinical services, in a facility with a floor area of 700 square meters.

== Endowment ==
Lorestan University is a public university. For the top-rank students from the national universities entrance exam, education is free in all public universities. Students with ranks below the normal capacity of the universities will be required to pay part or all of the tuition fee.

== Language of instruction ==
Although the official language of instruction in Lorestan is Persian, a number of lecture materials, reference books, homework assignments and even exams are in English.

== Academic year ==
The academic year is divided into three academic terms.

== Publishing ==
The university's publishing arm, the Lorestan University Press, has published academic books and journals.

== Student organisations ==
There are student organisations throughout the university.

== Population ==
The 2016 National Census reported a population of 652 people in five households. (Note: As a locality in Dehpir-e Jonubi Rural District of the Central District in Khorramabad County)

== Notable faculty ==
- Mohsen Adeli

== See also ==
- Education in Iran
- Higher education in Iran
- National Library of Iran
- List of Iranian Research Centers
- List of Iranian scientists from the pre-modern era
- Modern Iranian scientists and engineers
