= Adela Mohseni =

Afghan activist (born 1950)

- عادله محسنی
- Born: Maidan Wardak Province, Afghanistan
- Education: BA, Judicial law, University of Tabriz

Adela Mohseni (Dari: عادله محسنی) is an Afghan women's rights activist.

== Background ==
She was born in the Wardak province of Afghanistan and migrated with her family to Iran in 1978 at six years old. Mohseni attended the University of Tabriz and received a BA in Judicial Law. Mohseni returned to Afghanistan after the 2001 United States invasion and started working on women's rights in 2005 for the Heinrich Böll Foundation. In 2007, Mohseni began working as a program officer in the Kabul office of Rights and Democracy, a Canadian non-governmental organisation. Hamid Saboory, director in charge of the Kabul office, described Mohseni as "a very active member of Afghan civil society, helping Afghan women secure their rights".

== Refugee status ==
In February 2012, Mohseni received death threats and her family fled to India, hoping to emigrate to Canada with the help of her employer. While in India, Mohseni was granted refugee status by the United Nations Refugee Agency but was not processed for resettlement. Rights and Democracy was shut down by the Canadian government in April 2012, so Mohseni and her family were stranded in India and remained there until they returned to Kabul in December 2013. A year later, Mohseni traveled to the United Kingdom on a visitor's visa to attend a conference about Afghanistan and was granted refugee status and residence there.
