= Azim Gheychisaz =

Iranian mountaineer

Azim Gheichisaz
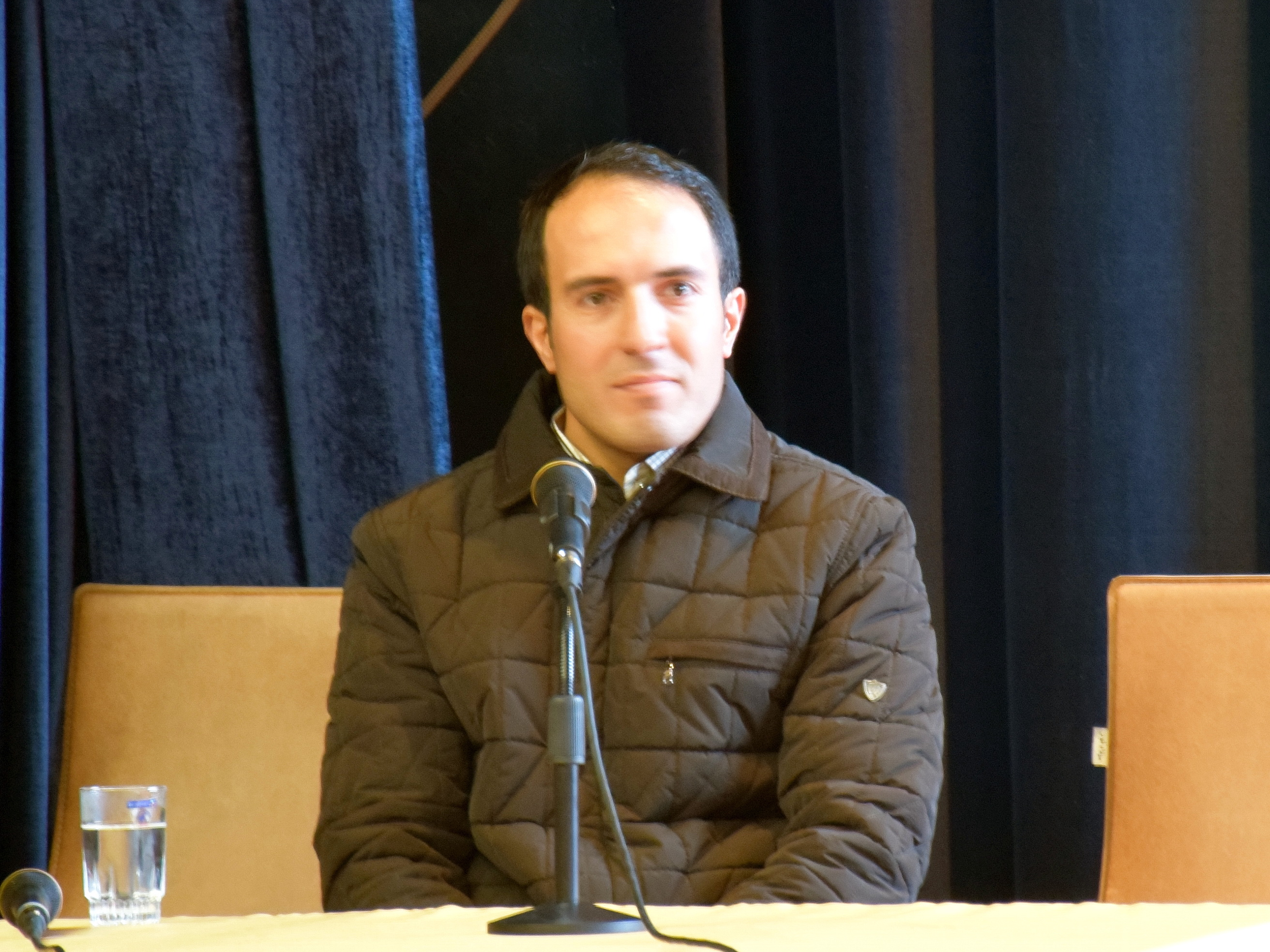
- Azim Gheichisaz (2016)

Personal information
- Nationality: Iranian
- Born: 1981 (age 44–45) Tabriz, Iran

Climbing career
- Known for: First Iranian to climb all 14 eight-thousanders without supplemental oxygen

Azim Gheychisaz (Persian: عظیم قیچی‌ساز) is an Iranian climber and summiter of all 14 Eight-thousanders without supplemental oxygen. Marble Wall peak in Kazakhstan was his first professional climbing in 2000. He is a member of Iranian national mountaineering team. He is considered as one Iran's most influential mountaineers, mentor, and role model to many new generations of elite Iranian climbers such as Andrew Aziz.

== Life ==
He was born on 1981 in Tabriz, Iran. He graduated from technical high school with a degree in machinery. He is student of Physical Education at University of Tabriz

== Successful ascents ==
Azim's successful ascents include following peaks

- 2002- Marble Wall Peak (6400 m)
- 2003- Gasherbrum I (up to 7800m)
- 2004- Diran Peak (up to 5500m)
- 2004- Spantik
- 2005- Everest (with supplementary oxygen)
- 2005- Ararat
- 2005- Damavand
- 2006- Noshaq
- 2008- Broad Peak
- 2009- Pobeda Peak
- 2010- Dhaulagiri, the first Iranian ascent
- 2010- Nanga Parbat, the first Iranian ascent
- 2011- Kangchenjunga, the first Iranian ascent
- 2011- Gasherbrum II
- 2011- Gasherbrum I
- 2012- Annapurna, the first Iranian ascent
- 2012- K2
- 2012- Manaslu
- 2013- Makalu, the first Iranian ascent
- 2013- Cho Oyu, the first Iranian ascent
- 2014- Shishapangma, the first Iranian ascent
- 2016- Everest (2nd ascent, without supplementary oxygen)
- 2017- Lhotse
