= Andrew Aziz =

Canadian trader, author, investor

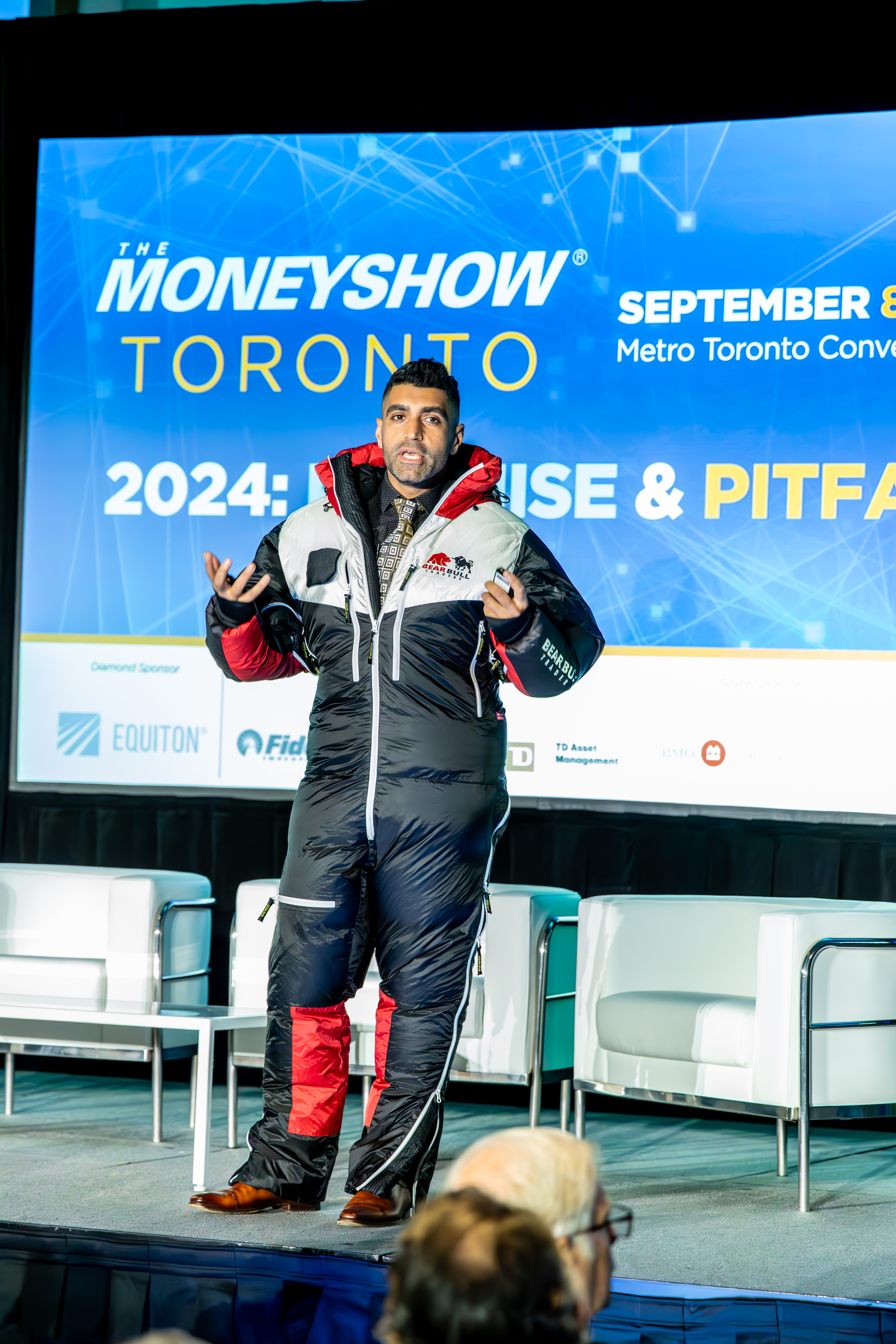
- Andrew Aziz presenting in a climbing suit at MoneyShow, Toronto in 2023
- Born: September 20, 1983 (age 43)
- Citizenship: Canada, Iran
- Education: University of British Columbia PhD in chemical engineering
- Occupations: Trader, investor, author, high-altitude mountaineer
- Years active: 2014–present
- Known for: 1) First Iranian man to climb Vinson Massif in Antarctica 2) First Iranian man to climb 7 highest peaks in 7 continents 3) Trading and investing books 4) "How to Day Trade for a Living" book

YouTube information
- Channel: Bear Bull Traders
- Years active: 2017–present
- Genres: Day Trading; investing
- Subscribers: 623,000
- Website: bearbulltraders.com

Andrew Aziz is a Canadian trader, investor and high-altitude mountaineer. He is known for his books on trading and investing, specially How to Day Trade for a Living. His books are considered classics in day trading and have been published in 20 languages worldwide and have been a best seller since 2016. He is the first Iranian man to climb Vinson Massif in Antarctica, and the first Iranian man to complete the Seven Summits challenge, climbing the highest peaks on seven continents.

In 2025, the University of British Columbia established the Andrew Aziz Graduate Award in the Department of Chemical and Biological Engineering to support international students who demonstrate initiative in expanding their skills beyond their primary field of research, reflecting the broader mindset Aziz believes UBC instilled in him.

== Personal life and career ==
Andrew was born and raised in Iran, but moved to Canada at age of 25 for PhD studies. He studied at Sharif University of Technology for masters, and graduated from the University of British Columbia with a PhD in chemical engineering. After completing his PhD, he worked as an engineer in Vancouver for AFCC, a Mercedes-Benz Group and Ford Motor Company research center until he lost his engineering position in 2014 and moved away from engineering to learn trading and investing.

In 2015, he published his first book, How to Day Trade for a Living, which received attention from traders and investors, garnering overall positive reviews. Since 2022, Investopedia and Business Insider recognized Aziz's book as one of the best trading books of the year.

He published How to Day Trade for a Living while he was climbing Everest first in 2015, where the Nepal 2015 earthquake happened. He had to spend 1 month extra in Khumbu valley near Everest basecamp, where he finished his first edition. All Everest expeditions were cancelled in 2015.

In 2020, he founded Peak Capital Trading, a propriety trading firm in Vancouver, Canada, with focus trading the US stock equity market. Peak Capital Trading is developing algorithms for opening range breakouts with research publications in the field.

== Day trading research ==
Since 2023, Andrew Aziz has co-authored several academic research papers with Carlo Zarattini and Andrea Barbon Professor of Finance at University of St Gallen, Switzerland, published on the Social Science Research Network (SSRN), analyzing the profitability of systematic day trading strategies in U.S. equity markets. Their studies focus on classic technical setups such as the Opening Range Breakout (ORB) and Volume Weighted Average Price (VWAP) strategies, testing them against passive benchmarks like the S&P 500 and Nasdaq ETFs.

One paper, Can Day Trading Really Be Profitable?, found that a disciplined ORB approach applied to leveraged ETFs such as TQQQ could generate annualized alpha exceeding 30% over multi-year periods, significantly outperforming passive buy-and-hold benchmarks. Another study, Volume Weighted Average Price (VWAP): The Holy Grail for Day Trading Systems, reported returns of over 8,000% using VWAP strategies on leveraged products during 2018–2023, with comparatively low drawdowns.

Further research explored intraday momentum strategies in Beat the Market: An Effective Intraday Momentum Strategy for S&P 500 ETF (SPY), which produced nearly 2,000% cumulative returns between 2007 and 2024 with Sharpe ratios above 1.3. In A Profitable Day Trading Strategy for the U.S. Equity Market, Aziz and Zarattini extended ORB testing to thousands of U.S. stocks, showing that trading "Stocks in Play" with high volume and catalysts could deliver net performance above 1,600% with a Sharpe ratio of 2.8.

Aziz also co-authored The Volatility Edge: A Dual Approach for VIX ETNs Trading with Carlo Zarattini and Antonio Mele, which examined volatility-based strategies using VIX exchange-traded notes between 2008 and 2025. The study tested constant and dynamic short-volatility approaches, showing that a rules-based strategy could deliver annualized returns of about 16 percent with a Sharpe ratio near 1 and low correlation to equity markets. The authors concluded that combining such volatility strategies with passive stock holdings could significantly enhance portfolio risk-adjusted performance, while cautioning that volatility products remain highly risky and require disciplined execution.

In addition to profitable strategies, Aziz and Zarattini examined deceptive practices in The Art of Financial Illusion: How to Use Martingale Betting Systems to Fool People, highlighting how such systems can mislead investors by producing seemingly consistent returns through statistical manipulation.

Together, these papers contribute to the academic debate over whether day trading can generate sustainable long-term profits, with their findings suggesting that disciplined, rules-based strategies executed on liquid instruments may achieve persistent excess returns.

=== Research work cited ===
- Aziz, Andrew and Zarattini, Carlo. Can Day Trading Really Be Profitable? Evidence of Sustainable Long-Term profits from Opening Range Breakout (ORB) Day Trading Strategy vs. Benchmark in the US Stock Market. SSRN Working Paper No. 4416622. First posted April 10, 2023; last revised April 21, 2025. Available at: https://ssrn.com/abstract=4416622
- Aziz, Andrew and Zarattini, Carlo. Volume Weighted Average Price (VWAP): The Holy Grail for Day Trading Systems. SSRN Working Paper No. 4631351. First posted November 13, 2023; last revised April 29, 2025. Available at: https://ssrn.com/abstract=4631351
- Aziz, Andrew and Zarattini, Carlo. Beat the Market: An Effective Intraday Momentum Strategy for S&P500 ETF (SPY). SSRN Working Paper No. 4824172. First posted May 10, 2024; last revised April 29, 2025. Available at: https://ssrn.com/abstract=4824172
- Aziz, Andrew and Zarattini, Carlo. A Profitable Day Trading Strategy for the U.S. Equity Market. SSRN Working Paper No. 4729284. First posted February 16, 2024; last revised April 29, 2025. Available at: https://ssrn.com/abstract=4729284
- Aziz, Andrew and Zarattini, Carlo. The Art of Financial Illusion: How to Use Martingale Betting Systems to Fool People. SSRN Working Paper No. 4678427. First posted December 28, 2023; last revised April 29, 2025. Available at: https://ssrn.com/abstract=4678427
- Aziz, Andrew, Zarattini, Carlo, and Mele, Antonio. The Volatility Edge: A Dual Approach for VIX ETNs Trading. SSRN Working Paper No. 5316487. First posted September 10, 2025. Available at: https://ssrn.com/abstract=5316487

== High-altitude climbing ==
He is one of Iran's prominent climbers known as the "third wave", a group marked by its more global outreach. This wave represents a significant evolution from the previous Iranian climbers generations, with climbers extending their expeditions beyond the local and regional mountains of Iran, and even past the renowned Himalayas and Karakoram ranges in Nepal and Pakistan. The second wave, which includes after Iranian Revolution climbers like Azim Gheichisaz, was known for pioneering ascents in Nepal and Pakistan. In contrast, the third wave climbers, often holding dual nationality Iranians living outside of Iran face fewer travel and visa restrictions. They are also typically well-funded and sponsored, allowing them to embark on ambitious climbing expeditions across various continents including Europe, South America, Oceania, and Antarctica. A summary of some of Aziz's recent climbs are:

Asia
Summit	Elevation (ft)	Elevation (m)	Country	Parent Mountain Range	Note
Everest	29,029 ft	8,848 m	Nepal	Himalayas	2023
Cho Oyu	26,864 ft	8,188 m	China	Himalayas	2024
Manaslu	26,781 ft	8,163 m	Nepal	Himalayas	2025
Ama Dablam	22,349 ft	6,812 m	Nepal	Himalayas	2026
Lobuche	16,109 ft	6,119 m	Nepal	Himalayas	2026
Damavand	18,406 ft	5,510 m	Iran	Alborz	2015 Winter ascent
Mount Ararat	16,854 ft	5,137 m	Turkey	Armenian Highlands	2023

Europe
Summit	Elevation (ft)	Elevation (m)	Country	Parent Mountain Range	Note
Mount Blanc	15,781 ft	4,810 m	Italy/France	Alps	2019
Dufourspitze	15,203 ft	4,634 m	Switzerland	Alps	2019
Weisshorn	14,783 ft	4,506 m	Switzerland	Alps	2019
Matterhorn	14,692 ft	4,478 m	Switzerland	Alps	2019
Dent Blanche	14,295 ft	4,357 m	Switzerland	Alps	2019

North America
Summit	Elevation (ft)	Elevation (m)	Country	Parent Mountain Range	Note
Denali	20,310 ft	6,190 m	(United States) US	Alaska Range	2023
Pico de Orizaba	18,491 ft	5,636 m	Mexico	Trans-Mexican Volcanic Belt	2018
Iztaccihuatl	17,160 ft	5,230 m	Mexico	Trans-Mexican Volcanic Belt	2018

South America
Summit	Elevation (ft)	Elevation (m)	Country	Parent Mountain Range	Note
Aconcagua	22,838 ft	6,961 m	Argentina	Andes – Principal Cordillera	2022
Ojos del Salado	22,615 ft	6,893 m	Chile	Andes	2025
Chimborazo	20,548 ft	6,263 m	Ecuador	Andes – Cordillera Occidental (Ecuador)	2020
Cotopaxi	19,347 ft	5,897 m	Ecuador	Andes – Cordillera Occidental (Ecuador)	2020
Cayambe	18,996 ft	5,790 m	Ecuador	Andes – Cordillera Occidental (Ecuador)	2020
Antisana	18,714 ft	5,704 m	Ecuador	Andes – Cordillera Occidental (Ecuador)	2022
Illiniza	17,218 ft	5,248 m	Ecuador	Andes – Cordillera Occidental (Ecuador)	2021
Sajama	21,463 ft	6,542 m	Bolivia	Andes – Cordillera Occidental (Bolivia)	2023
Illimani	21,122 ft	6,438 m	Bolivia	Andes – Cordillera Occidental (Bolivia)	2023
Huandoy	20,866 ft	6,360 m	Peru	Cordillera Blanca	2021
Chopicalqui	20,846 ft	6,354 m	Peru	Cordillera Blanca	2021
Chinchey	20,699 ft	6,309 m	Peru	Cordillera Blanca	2021

Africa
Summit	Elevation (ft)	Elevation (m)	Country	Parent Mountain Range	Note
Kilimanjaro	19,340 ft	5,895 m	Tanzania	Eastern Rift mountains	2021

Oceania
Summit	Elevation (ft)	Elevation (m)	Country	Parent Mountain Range	Note
Mount Giluwe	14,327 ft	4,367 m	Papua New Guinea	Southern Highlands Province	2019
Mount Wilhlem	14,793 ft	4,509 m	Papua New Guinea	Southern Highlands Province	2024

Antarctica
Summit	Elevation (ft)	Elevation (m)	Country	Parent Mountain Range	Note
Mount Vinson	16,050 ft	4,892 m	Antarctica	Sentinel Range, Ellsworth Mountains	2024

== Books and publications ==
1. Al-Mansoori, Aiman, Aziz, Andrew (2 April 2026) Complete Guide to Multiple Time Frame Analysis and Reading Price Action. ISBN 979-8-2515-5330-7
2. Aziz, Andrew, Sheehy-Kelly, Crede (10 August 2025). TradeBook: How to Build a Complete Day Trading System. ISBN 9-798-2962-8918-6
3. Aziz, Andrew, Baer, Micheal (11 May 2021). Introduction to Trading Psychology: A Practical Guide to Improve Your Trading Psychology. ISBN 979-8-7460-9637-1
4. Aziz, Andrew, Baer, Mike (19 November 2020). Mastering Trading Psychology: Improve Your Trading with Firsthand Reports by Real-Life Traders. ISBN 979-8-5634-5400-2
5. Aziz, Andrew, Aaziznia, Ardalan (14 October 2020). Stock Market Explained: A Beginner's Guide to Investing and Trading in the Modern Stock Market. ISBN 979-8-6958-5032-1
6. Aziz, Andrew, Pezim, Brian (2 October 2018). How to Swing Trade: A Beginner's Guide to Trading Tools, Money Management, Rules, Routines and Strategies of a Swing Trader. ISBN 978-1-7266-3175-4
7. Aziz, Andrew (12 June 2018). Advanced Techniques in Day Trading: A Practical Guide to High Probability Strategies and Methods. ISBN 978-1-7211-5126-4
8. Aziz, Andrew (28 July 2016). How to Day Trade for a Living: A Beginner's Guide to Trading Tools and Tactics, Money Management, Discipline and Trading Psychology. ISBN 978-1-5355-8595-8
