= Mohammad-Reza Pour-Mohammadi =

Former Iranian provincial governor

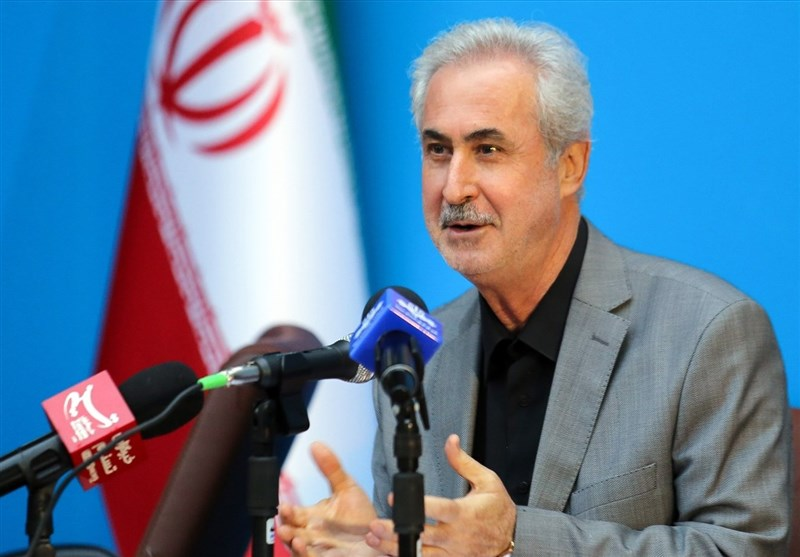

Governor-general of East Azerbaijan
- In office 28 November 2018 – 17 October 2021
- President: Hassan Rouhani
- Preceded by: Majid Khodabakhsh
- Succeeded by: Zeinolabedin Razavi Khorram

Personal details
- Born: 1958 (age 67–68) Tabriz, Iran
- Education: Cardiff University
- Occupation: Politician, Professor, Chancellor of the University of Tabriz
- Website: asatid.tabrizu.ac.ir/fa/pages/home.aspx?pourmohammadi

Mohammad-Reza Pour-Mohammadi (born 1958 in Tabriz, East Azerbaijan) is the former governor of East Azerbaijan province, from 2018 to 2021. He was the President of Tabriz University from January 2014 to September 2018 and also from 2002 to 2005 at Reform Government.

== Early life ==
Pour-Mohammadi was born in 1958 in Tabriz to Azerbaijani parents. He graduated high school in Tabriz, and graduated with a PhD in Urban Planning from Cardiff University.

== Background ==
- Chairman of the Tenth Congress of the International Conference of Civil Engineering in the University of Tabriz.
- Cooperation with educational institutions Nakhchivan.
- Cooperation with the Ganja State University.
- The host of Caucasus University Association in Tabriz.
- Specialized meetings begin with professors Tabriz and Baku Chaired by Pour-Mohammadi.

Academic offices
Preceded by Parviz Azhideh	President of Tabriz University; 2014–2018	Succeeded by Mir Reza Majidi
