= Golnar Servatian =

Iranian cartoonist and book illustrator (born 1977)

Golnar Servatian گلنار ثروتیان
- Born: 5 September 1977 (age 48); Tabriz, East Azarbaijan, Iran
- Known for: Illustrating, cartooning
- Family: Behrouz Servatian (father)
- Website: golnarservatian.com

Golnar Servatian (Persian: گلنار ثروتیان; also Romanized as "Golnār Servatiān", Persian pronunciation: [golˈnɒːɾ seɾvætiˈjɒːn]; born 1977 in Tabriz) is an Iranian cartoonist and book illustrator.

== Biography ==
Golnar Servatian was born in 1977 in Tabriz, East Azerbaijan Province, Iran. Her father, Behrouz Servatian, was a professor of the Persian language and literature. She began her career as Graphic designer and Cartoonist in 2006. She has spent most of her time focusing on illustrating children’s books and magazines, and has done this professionally since 2006. She has illustrated about 50 books for children and worked with different publishers inside Iran. Painting, writing stories and poems are a kind of hobby for her.

== Career ==
Servatian won the jury award in the competition with Brazil, Russia, Finland, Poland, Turkey, Mexico, and Italy at the Biennial Cartoon and Imagination Festival in China. She also won the 2016 "Berlin Audience Award and Certificate" of "7th International Cartoon Competition". Golnar Servatian was among the three Iranian illustrators whose works, along with works by other artists from France, Italy, Mexico, and the United States, were featured at the 16th Italy Teatrio Imagery Exhibition.

== Festivals and awards ==
- Audience Award and Certificate of "7th International Cartoon Competition", Berlin, 2016
- Selected title of "The International Eskişehir Cartoon Festival", Turkey, 2016
- Second rank at "1st International Festival of Muhammad, Prophet of Kindness" 2015
- First rank at "Poster Design at Shour and Sho'oor Festival, 2013
- First grade of "Linocut Print" in country level in the "14th Festival of Visual Arts", Hamedan, Iran, 2012
- First grade of "Linocut Print" in country level in the "13th Festival of Visual Arts", Kerman, Iran, 2011
- Selected title of "4th International Exhibition of Humorous Drawings on Sport", Fossano, Italy, 2011
- Selected title of The "International Illustration Contest" the Cannonball Lady, Teatrio, Italy, 2011
- Selected prize in "Master Cup International Cartoon and Illustration Biennial", China, 2007
- Selected title at the "Belgrade Biennial of Illustrations", Belgrade, Yugoslavia, 2007
- Third rank at "First Festival of Card Postal Creation of Academic Jihad Art Branch", 2007
- Acceptance of illustration in "Illustration Exhibition of 200th Annual of Hans Christian Andersen", 2005
- Honorary diploma at the "Second Festival of Text-Book Illustration", Tehran, 2005
- Second rank of illustration in country level at the "8th Festival of Visual Arts", 2005
- Honorary diploma at the "1st Festival of Primary Text-Books Illustration", Tehran, 2004
- First grade of illustration in country level at the "6th Festival of Visual Arts", 2003

== Publications ==
=== Persian ===
Servatian has written and illustrated more than 40 children books and magazines. Among her books as creator (writer and illustrator) are these Persian books:

- Mūrcheh [Ant], Tehran: Mashgh-e Honar, 2012
- Būzīneh [Ape], Tehran: Mashgh-e Honar, 2012
- Parvāneh [Butterfly], Tehran: Mashgh-e Honar, 2012
- Gāv [Cow], Tehran: Mashgh-e Honar, 2012
- Efrīt va Bāzargān [Demon and the Merchant], Tehran: Mashgh-e Honar, 2012
- Fīl-hā va Parastū-hā [Elephants and Swallows], Tehran: Mashgh-e Honar, 2012
- Golparī, Tehran: Mashgh-e Honar, 2012
- Hodhod [Hoopoe], Tehran: Mashgh-e Honar, 2012
- Mār [Snake], Tehran: Mashgh-e Honar, 2012
- Ankabūt [Spider], Tehran: Mashgh-e Honar, 2012
- Nahang [Whale], Tehran: Mashgh-e Honar, 2012
- Māhi-e Kūchūlū-ye Sargashte [The Little Bewildered Fish], translated by Shima Yazdi, illustrated by Golnar Servatian, Tehran: Shazde Kocholo Publications, 2019

She has been a co-author of these Persian secondary school textbooks:

- Tarrāhi-e Nešāneh, Tasvīrgari-e Ketāb-e Kūdak va Nezārat-e Čāp [Designing Signs, Children's Books Illustration and Print Supervision], a textbook for the 11th-graders, Technical and Professional Branch: Art Group, Photo-Graphic, Tehran: The Organization for Research and Educational Planning, 2017 (2nd impression: 2018), Chapter III, pp. 79–140
- Rāhnamā-ye Honarāmūz; Tarrāhi-e Nešāneh, Tasvīrgari-e Ketāb-e Kūdak va Nezārat bar Čāp [Tutorial Guide; Designing Signs, Children's Books Illustration and Print Supervision], a textbook for the 11th-graders, Technical and Professional Branch: Art Group, Photo-Graphic, Tehran: The Organization for Research and Educational Planning, 2017

=== English ===
- Our Colorful World, USA: Prolance Book Publishing, 2020

Servatian has also illustrated the books:

- My First Muslim Potty Book, written by Yousfa Janjua, USA: Prolance Book Publishing, 2020
- A Horse Named Horace: One of a Kind, written by Nayera Salam, USA: Prolance Book Publishing, 2021
