= University of Tabriz =

Public university in Tabriz, Iran

- دانشگاه تبريز; Dāneshgāh-e Tabriz
- Former names: Azerbaijan National University; University of Azarabadegan
- Motto: تزکيه و تعليم
- Motto in English: Refinements and Education
- Type: Public
- Established: 1947; 79 years ago
- Founder: Ja'far Pishevari
- Affiliations: FUIW; CUA
- Endowment: US$ 384.3 million (December 10, 2021)
- Chancellor: Mohammad Taghi Alami
- Faculty: 819 (2018)
- Administrative staff: 800
- Students: 24,000 (2010)
- Location: Tabriz, Iran; 38°03′49″N 46°19′43″E
- Campus: Urban, 1,445 acres (2.3 sq mi; 584.8 ha) land and 80 acres (32 ha) buildings and offices
- Colors: Navy blue, white, black
- Website: tabrizu.ac.ir/en

The University of Tabriz (Persian: دانشگاه تبريز, Dāneshgāh-e Tabriz) is a public university located in Tabriz, East Azerbaijan province, Iran. It is one of the top five high-ranked universities in Iran and one of the ten most selective universities in the country. The University of Tabriz is the second-oldest university in Iran after the University of Tehran, and has the second largest campus area in the country. The university is a member of the Caucasus University Association.

Funding for the University of Tabriz is provided by the Ministry of Science, Research and Technology. Admission to the university for Iranian applicants is through a national entrance examination which is administered annually by the Ministry of Science, Research and Technology, and for international applicants through specific regulations.

== History ==
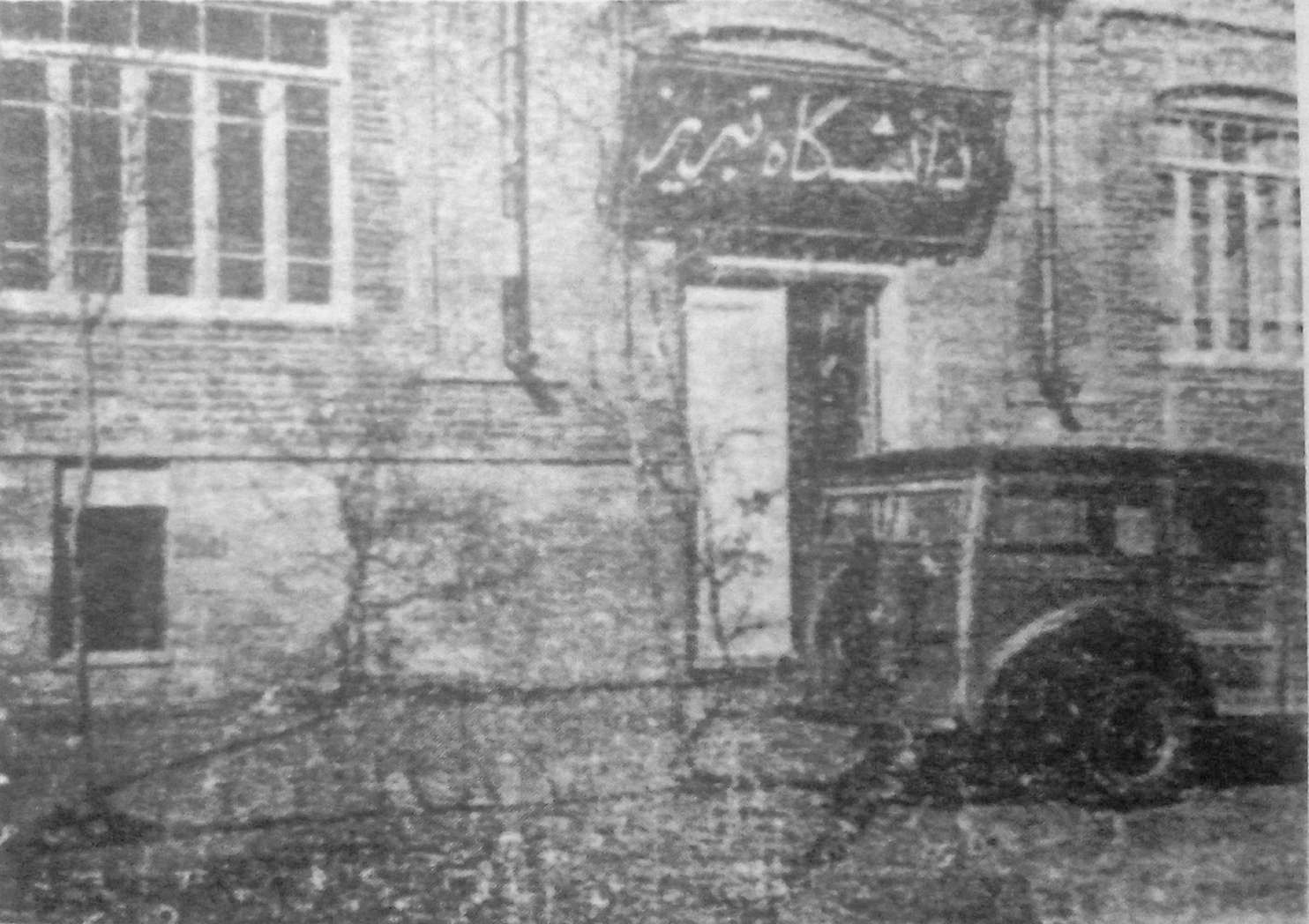
University of Tabriz, medical faculty, 1947

The history of the higher education in Tabriz, well known for being a cradle of civilization for centuries, goes back to 720 years ago when the Rab' l-Rashidi international complex was founded. Inheriting this background, the University of Tabriz, founded in 1947, is the second oldest university in Iran. The university started its activities under the name of the University of Azarabadegan with Faculties of Medicine, Agriculture, and Pedagogy in 1946, after legislation of the Establishment of the Universities in the Cities act by the National Parliament of Iran. The University of Azarabadegan was renamed as the "University of Tabriz" following the 1979 Islamic Revolution. In 1985 and following the approval of Islamic parliament all the faculties and centers affiliated to medical sciences in Iran were separated and started their work independently under the title of medical universities. Thereafter, Tabriz University of Medical Sciences was separated from the University of Tabriz and continued its activities under the supervision of the ministry of health and medical education.

== Academic profile ==
It is now educating more than 24,000 undergraduate and postgraduate students, with over 800 academic staff of whom about 750 are Ph.D. holders. Out of this teaching staff, 195 are full professors, 315 are associate professors, 270 are assistant professors and the remaining are instructors. A body of over 1,000 personnel is supporting academic activities. Today, the university provides both undergraduate and graduate programs in 22 main departments. The student body consists of about 14,000 undergraduate students and 7,000 graduate students from all over the country.

=== University entrance exam ===
Undergraduate admission to the University of Tabriz is limited to the top 3 percent of students who pass the national entrance examination administered annually by the Iranian Ministry of Science, Research, and Technology. For some competitive fields, it has to be between 1 percent. The participants of this exam must answer the questions of physics, mathematics and chemistry well in order to get admission. The master and doctorate exams are similar and the participants answer the specialized questions of their fields.

=== Reputation ===
The university is known to be strict and usually, the grade point average (GPA) of students is lower than their peers in other Iranian universities. Also the university has its own rules for grading (GPA), which is different from the system of most universities in the world. The University of Tabriz is well known as a tough university with a low GPA especially in Civil, Electrical and Mechanical engineering. As such, many students at the University of Tabriz believe their grades do not reflect their academic performance.

== Education and research ==
University of Tabriz has several research centers, including center of Control Systems consisting of Artificial Intelligence, MPC, CANS, Robotics, System Identification & Advanced Process Control labs, Center of Excellence in Mechatronics Systems, Center for Applied Physics and Astronomical Research, Biotechnology Center for Pharmaceutical Herbs, Research Center for Fundamental Sciences, Geographic Research Center, Three-Scholars Research Center (Se-Allameh Tabrizi), Center for Social Research, Center for History and Culture as well as Khaje-Nasireddin Toosi Observatory.

=== Statistics of researches ===
Based on the online statistics of the scientific measurement and ranking department of the university, CIVILICA database, which announces the number of articles produced in conferences in Iran, University of Tabriz with approximately 22,900 national articles and 19,600 international articles, It ranks 6th among the country's public universities in terms of the number of articles, journals and conferences.

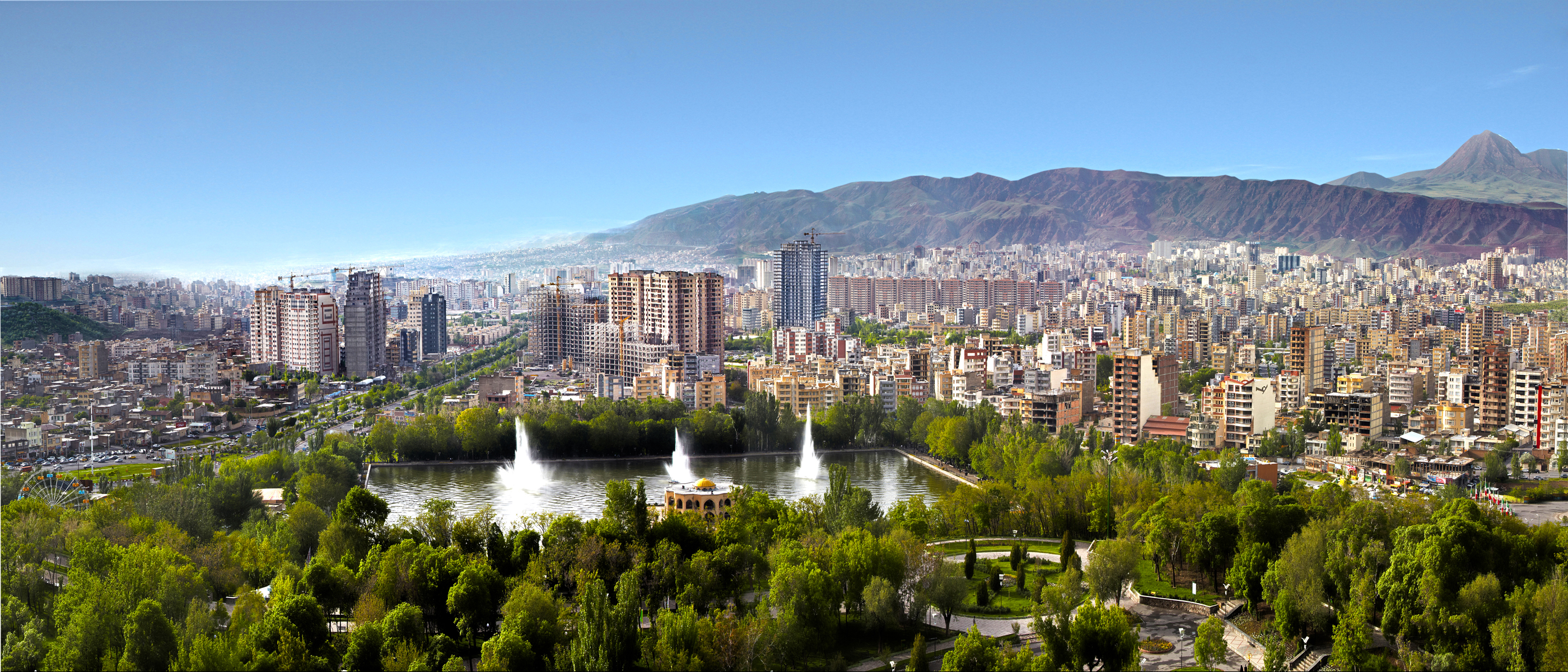
City of Tabriz

== Campuses ==
The University of Tabriz has its main campus in Tabriz, as well as three other satellite campuses, Aras International Campus, Miyaneh Technical College, and Marand Technical College, which in total area make up the second largest campus after Isfahan University of Technology in Iran.

- Main Campus in Tabriz
- Aras International Campus
- Miyaneh Technical College
- Marand Technical College

Also, University of Tabriz is the helper of universities in the northwest of Iran and supports and establishes schools in different cities. Mohaghegh Ardabili University, University of Maragheh and University of Bonab have branched from this university.

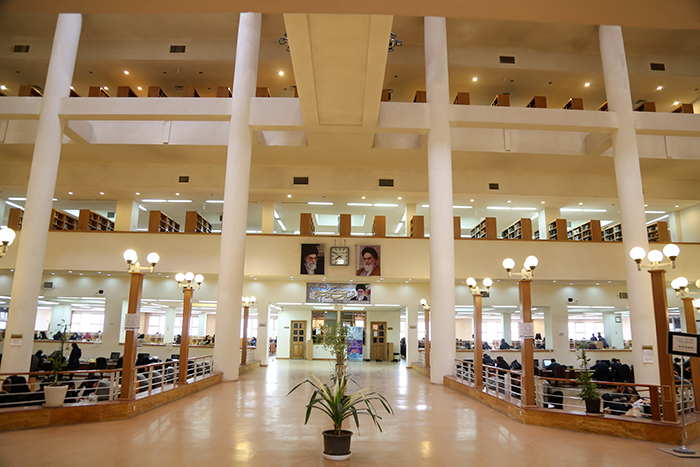
The Central Library of University of Tabriz

== Faculties ==
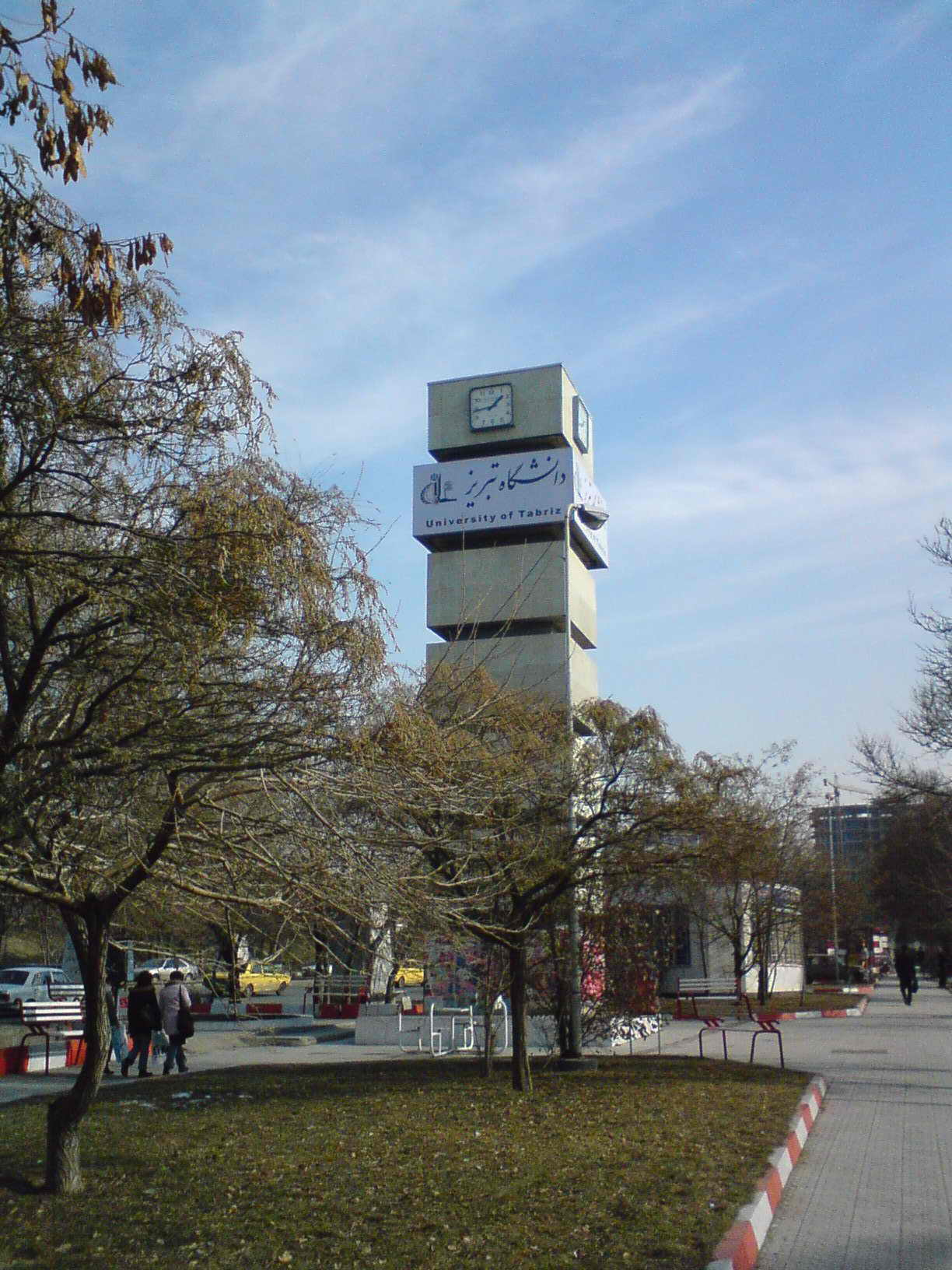
The Tower of University of Tabriz

- Ahar Faculty of Agriculture
- Faculty of Agriculture
- Faculty of Veterinary Medicine
- Faculty of Biology
- Faculty of Chemical and Petroleum Engineering
- Faculty of Chemistry
- Faculty of Civil Engineering
- Faculty of Planning and Environmental Sciences
- Faculty of Economics, Management & Business
- Faculty of Education & Psychology
- Faculty of Electrical & Computer Engineering
- Faculty of Engineering – Emerging Technologies
- Faculty of Law & Social Sciences
- Faculty of Mathematical Sciences
- Faculty of Mechanical Engineering
- Faculty of Natural Sciences
- Faculty of Persian & Foreign Languages
- Faculty of Physical Education & Sports Science
- Faculty of Physics

== World rankings ==
University rankings
- University of Tabriz

Global – Overall
- ARWU World: 701-800 (2023)
- CWUR World: 985 (2023)
- CWTS World: 463 (2022)
- QS World: =578 (2026)
- RUR World: 501 (2021)
- THE World: 501-600 (2023)
- USNWR Global: 521 (2024)

Regional – Overall
- QS Asia: 225 (2025)

In 2025, Performance Ranking of Scientific Papers for World Universities (NTU Ranking) ranked University of Tabriz 650-700th in the world. On 15 December 2025, University Ranking by Academic Performance (URAP) ranked University of Tabriz 535th in the world. The 2025 edition of the U.S. News & World Report Best Global University Ranking ranked it 584th in the category "Best Global Universities", with a score of 49.9. Based on SCImago Institutions Rankings, University of Tabriz's overall rank is 5238th in the world in 2025. The QS World University Rankings ranked University of Tabriz 225th in Asia in 2025. The Shanghai Ranking ranked University of Tabriz 901–1000 in the world in 2025.

=== Ranking in Iran ===
University of Tabriz is always a top 10 university in Iran and was ranked 5th among the comprehensive universities. Sixteen faculty members were among one percent top scientists of the world in 2021. Based on Thomson Reuters, it was included among the most influential universities in the world and ranked 4th among Iranian comprehensive universities.

=== Subject ranking ===
Times Higher Education World University Rankings in 2025

Subject	World Ranking	Ranking in Iran
General Engineering	601-800	9
Computer Science	601-800	10
Language, Literature & Linguistics	601-800	5
Health	601-800	13
Electrical Engineering	601-800	9
Civil Engineering	601-800	9
Sport sciences	601-800	5

Academic Ranking of World Universities in 2025

Subject	World Ranking
Water Resources	76-100
Instrument Science and Technology	151-200
Food Science and Technology	151-200
Mechanical Engineering	301-400
Civil Engineering	151-200
Chemical Engineering	301-400
Energy Science and Engineering	201-300
Electrical and Electronic Engineering	401-500

U.S.News Subject Ranking in 2025

Subject	World Ranking
Electrical Engineering	242
Mechanical Engineering	90
Civil Engineering	131
Chemical Engineering	129
Chemistry	188
Mathematics	360
Computer Science	559
Food Science and Technology	34
Agricultural Sciences	172
Physical Chemistry	364
Materials Science	486
Energy and Fuels	110
Plant and Animal Science	307
Environment/Ecology	313
Water Resources	41
Polymer Science	51

== Institutes ==
Due to its research work, the university is recognized as a Center of Excellence for six fields: Geographical Studies of Northwest Iran; Biology; Mechatronics; Molecular Plant Breeding; New Materials and Clean Chemistry; and Photonics and Plasma. Several research centres are housed on campus, including the Centre of Excellence in Mechatronics Systems, the Centre for Applied Physics and Astronomical Research, and the Biotechnology Centre for Pharmaceutical Herbs.

- Center of Excellence in Mechatronics Systems
- Applied Physics and Astronomy
- Fundamental Science
- Geography
- Iranian History and Culture
- Islamic & Humanity Science
- Social Science
- Environment
University view changing through the years

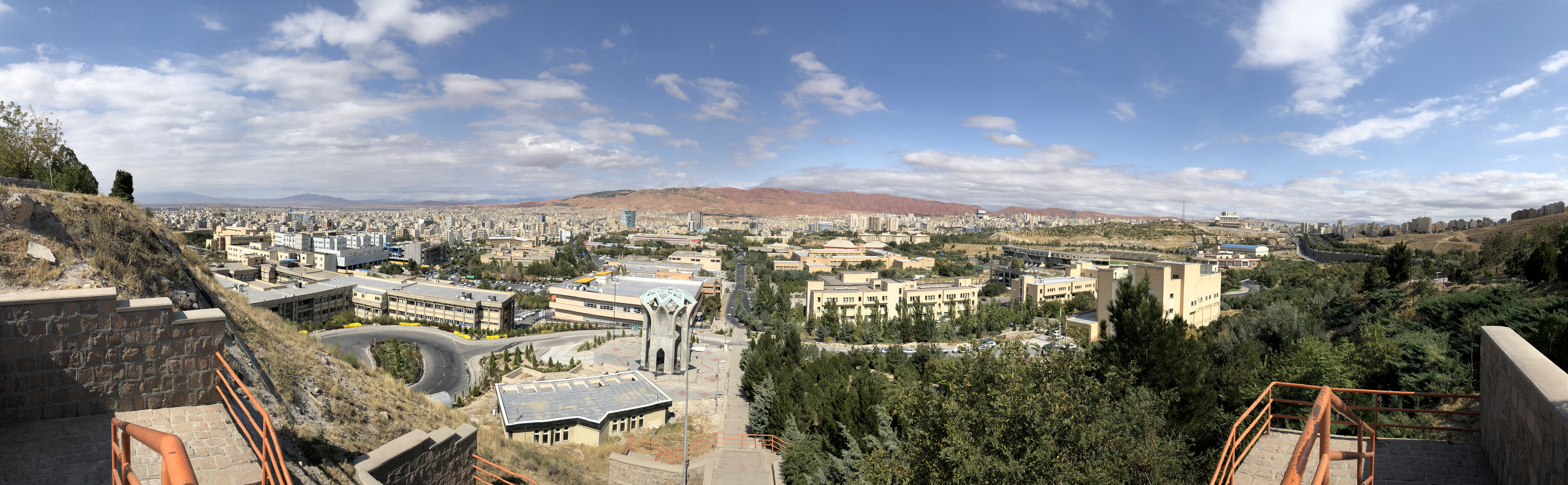
The new general view of University of Tabriz

== International collaboration ==
University of Tabriz has an active role in international associations, e.g. International Universities Council (IUC), Eurasian Silk Road Universities Consortium (ESRUC), and Association of Caucasian Universities (KUNIB). Furthermore, University of Tabriz was the full member of the Administrative Board of International Association of Universities (IAU) from 2008 to 2012. Moreover, it has signed 90 MOU with different universities in the world to conduct joint programs.

In the CWTS Leiden Ranking 2022 (in indicator of international collaboration), University of Tabriz ranked 581st of the world and 8th of Iran. The number of international students in university of Tabriz is over 1100 people.

== University notables ==
=== Chancellors ===
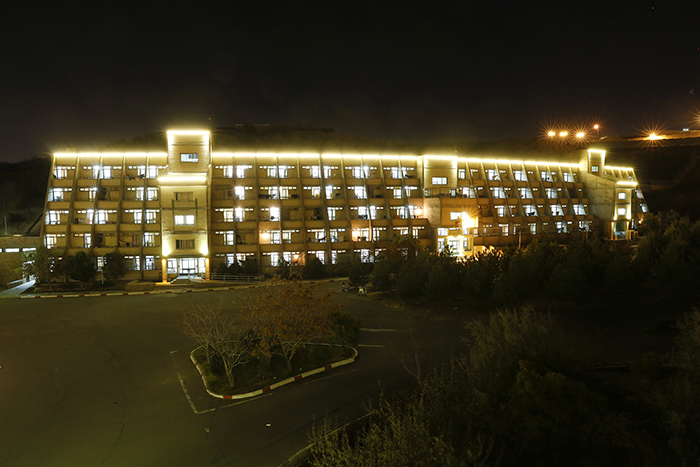
The Dormitory of University of Tabriz

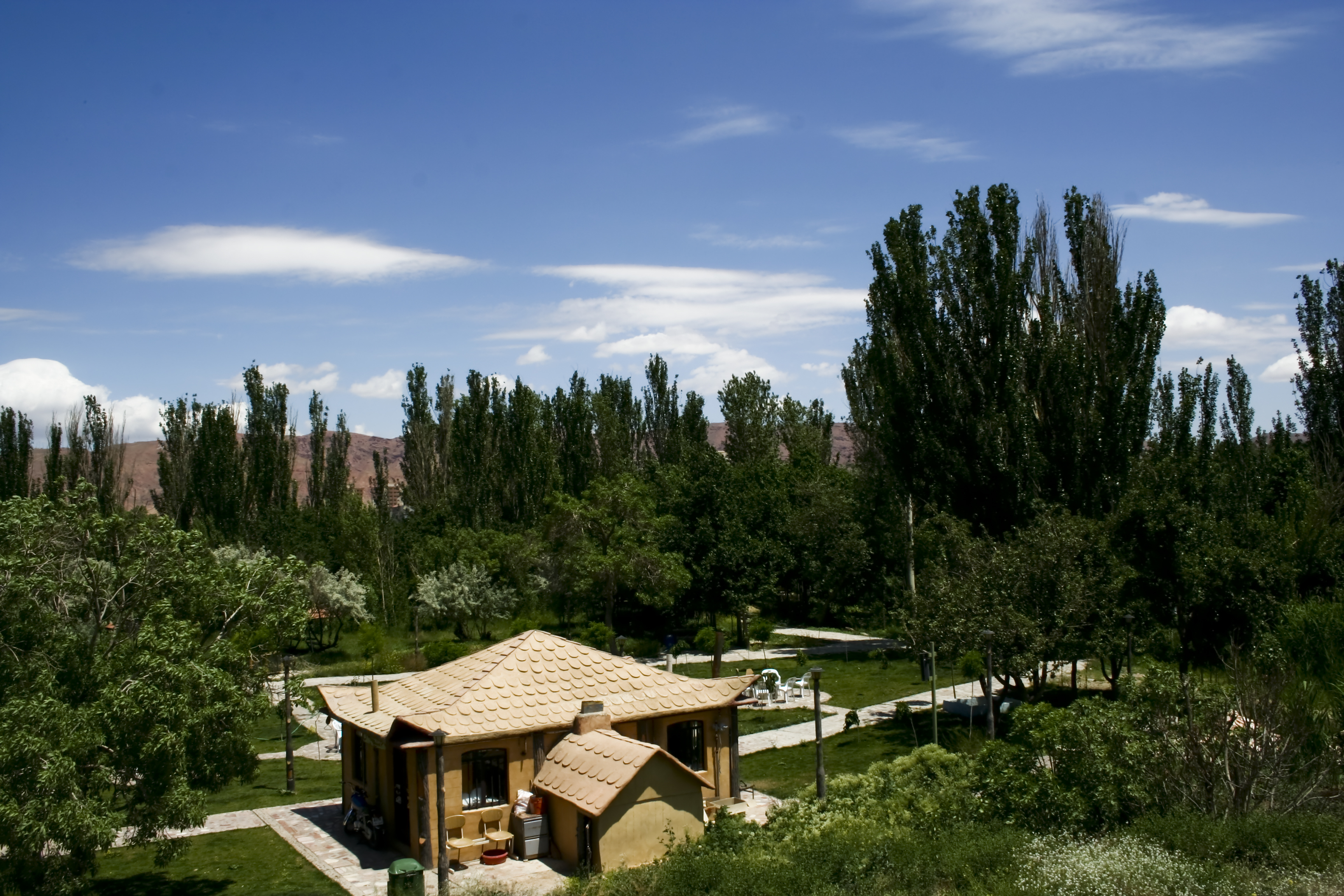
The Garden of University of Tabriz

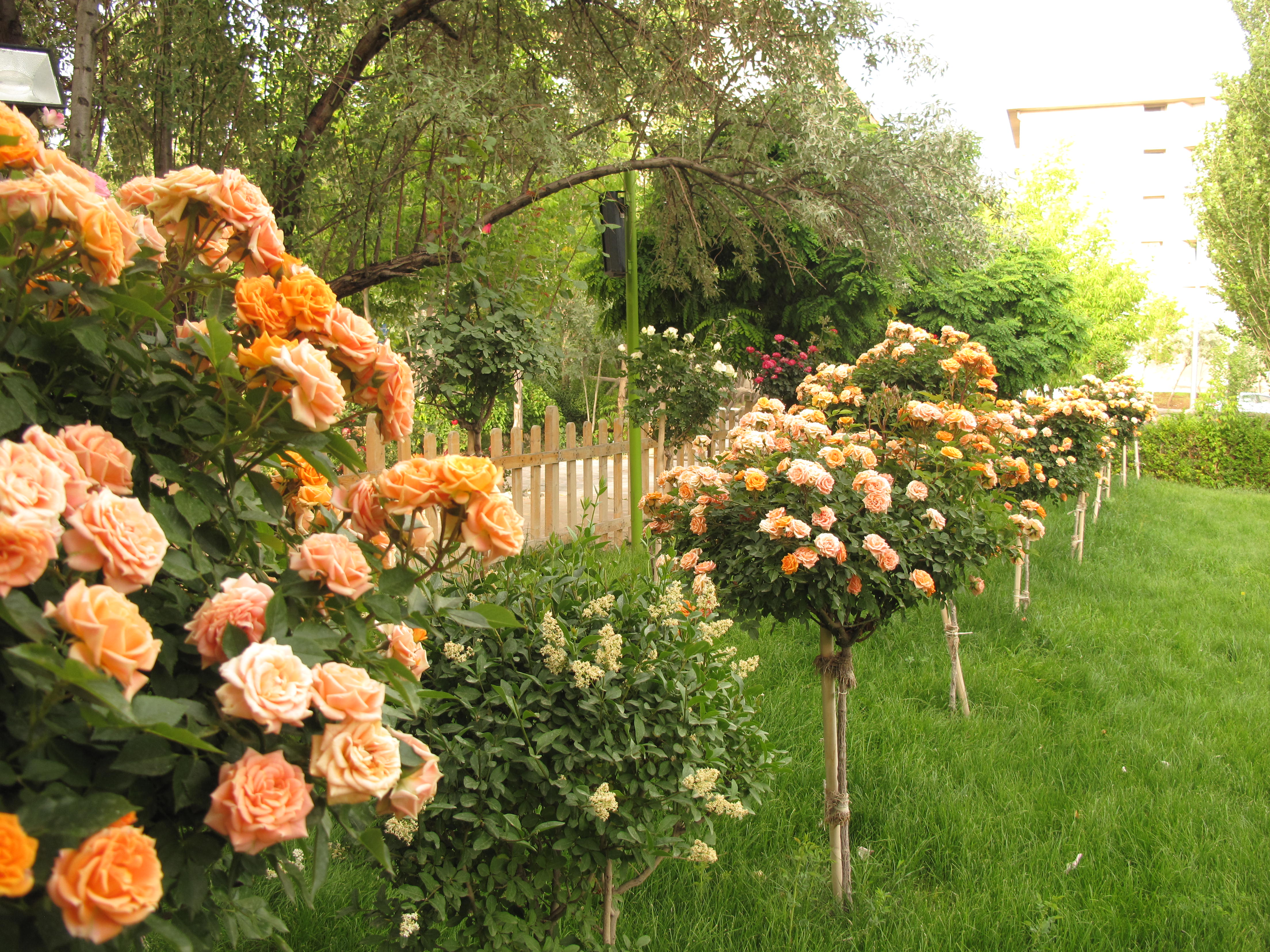
The Flowers of University of Tabriz

Chancellor	Tenure	Alma mater	Speciality
Khanbaba Bayani	1947–1950	(France) Sorbonne	Literature
Manouchehr Eghbal	1950–1952	(France) Académie Nationale de Médecine	Medicine
Seyyed Mohammad Sajjadi	1952	(France) Académie Nationale de Médecine	Law
Mohsen Hashtroodi	1952–1953	(France) Sorbonne	Mathematics
Nasser-Gholi Ardalan	1953	(Belgium) Université Libre de Bruxelles	Law
Mohammad-Shafi Amin	1953–1956	(Iran) University of Tehran	Medicine
Abass-Gholi Golshaiyan	1956–1957	(Iran) Dar ul-Funun	Law
Gholam-Ali Bazargan-Dilmaqani	1957–1964	(Iran) University of Tehran	Sciences
Mohammad-Ali Saffari	1964–1967	Military University of Russia	Military Academy
Taqi Sarlak	1967	(Sweden) and (Belgium)	Mechanical Engineering
Houshang Montaseri	1967–1968	(France) University of Strasbourg	Mathematics
Manouchehr Taslimi	1968–1972	(United Kingdom) University College London	Philosophy
Aliakbar Hassanzadeh	1972	(Iran) University of Tehran	Medicine
Hamid Zahedi	1972–1975		Law
Mohammad-Ali Faqih	1975–1977		Literature
Manouchehr Mortazavi	1977–1978	(Iran) University of Tehran	Literature
Ghobad Fathi	1978–1979	(Iran) University of Tehran	Medicine
Abolfath Seqatoleslam	1979	(Iran) University of Tehran	Medicine
Hassan Baroughi	1979–1980	(France) Sorbonne	Agriculture
Hossein Sadeghi-Shoja	1980–1983	(United Kingdom) Royal College of Surgeons of England	Medicine
Husain Saiflu	1983–1986	(United Kingdom) University of Stirling	Mathematics
Seyyed-Mehdi Golabi	1989–1991	(France) University of Paris	Chemistry/Pharmaceutical
Mohammad-Hosein Pour-Feyzi	1991–2002	(United Kingdom) University of Wales	Science
Mohammad-Reza Pour-Mohammadi	2002–2005	(United Kingdom) Cardiff University	Urban Planning
Mohammad-Hosein Sorour-odin	2005–2008	(United Kingdom) University of Birmingham	Chemistry
Mohammad-Taqi Alavi	2008–2012	(Iran) University of Tehran	Philosophy
Parviz Azhideh	2012–2014	(Iran) Allameh Tabatabaei University	Literature
Mohammad-Reza Pour-Mohammadi	2014–2018	(United Kingdom) Cardiff University	Urban Planning
Mir-Reza Majidi	2018–2021	(Australia) University of Wollongong	Chemistry
Safar Nasrollahzadeh	2021–present	(Iran) University of Tabriz	Ecology

=== Notable alumni ===
University of Tabriz alumni

- Adela Mohseni, Afghan women's rights activist
- Samad Behrangi – writer and social critic
- Azim Gheychisaz – mountain climber
- Faraj Sarkohi – journalist and literacy critic
- Hooshang Amirahmadi – political analyst, president of the American-Iranian council
- Mehdi Bakeri – former chief commander of Islamic Revolutionary Guard Corps
- Ali Akbar Entezami – father of the chemistry and polymer science of Iran
- Ali Saeedlou – Vice-president of Iran
- Ali Abdolalizadeh – former housing minister of Iran
- Easmaeil Jabbarzadeh – governor of East Azerbaijan
- Ebrahim Rezaei Babadi – politician, governor-general of Kermanshah Province
- Kaveh Madani – Deputy Head of Iran's Department of Environment.
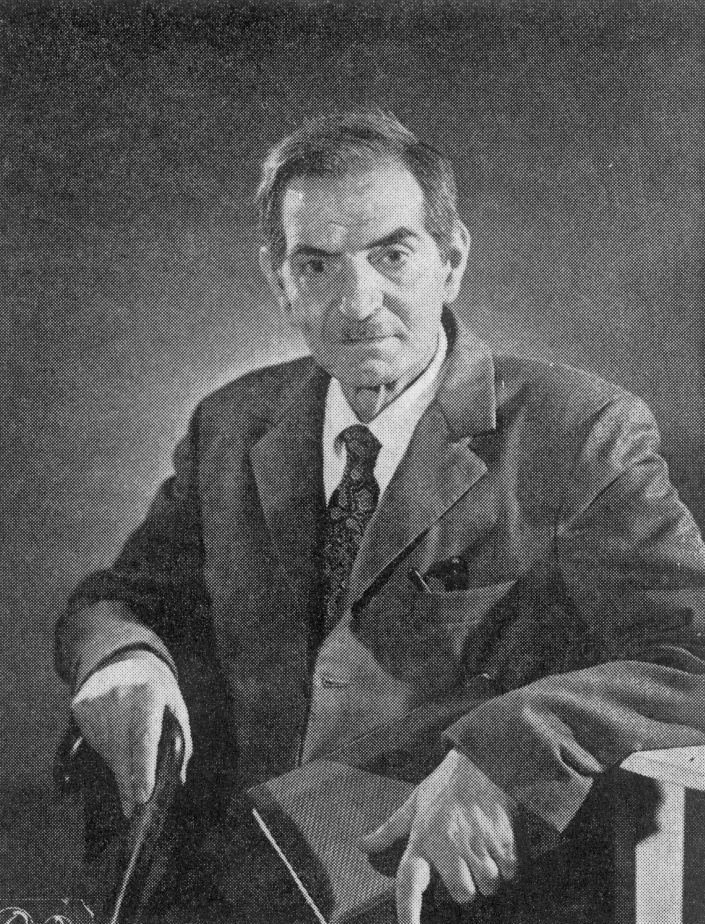
Mohammad-Hossein Shahriar: one of the greatest Iranian poets in the world.

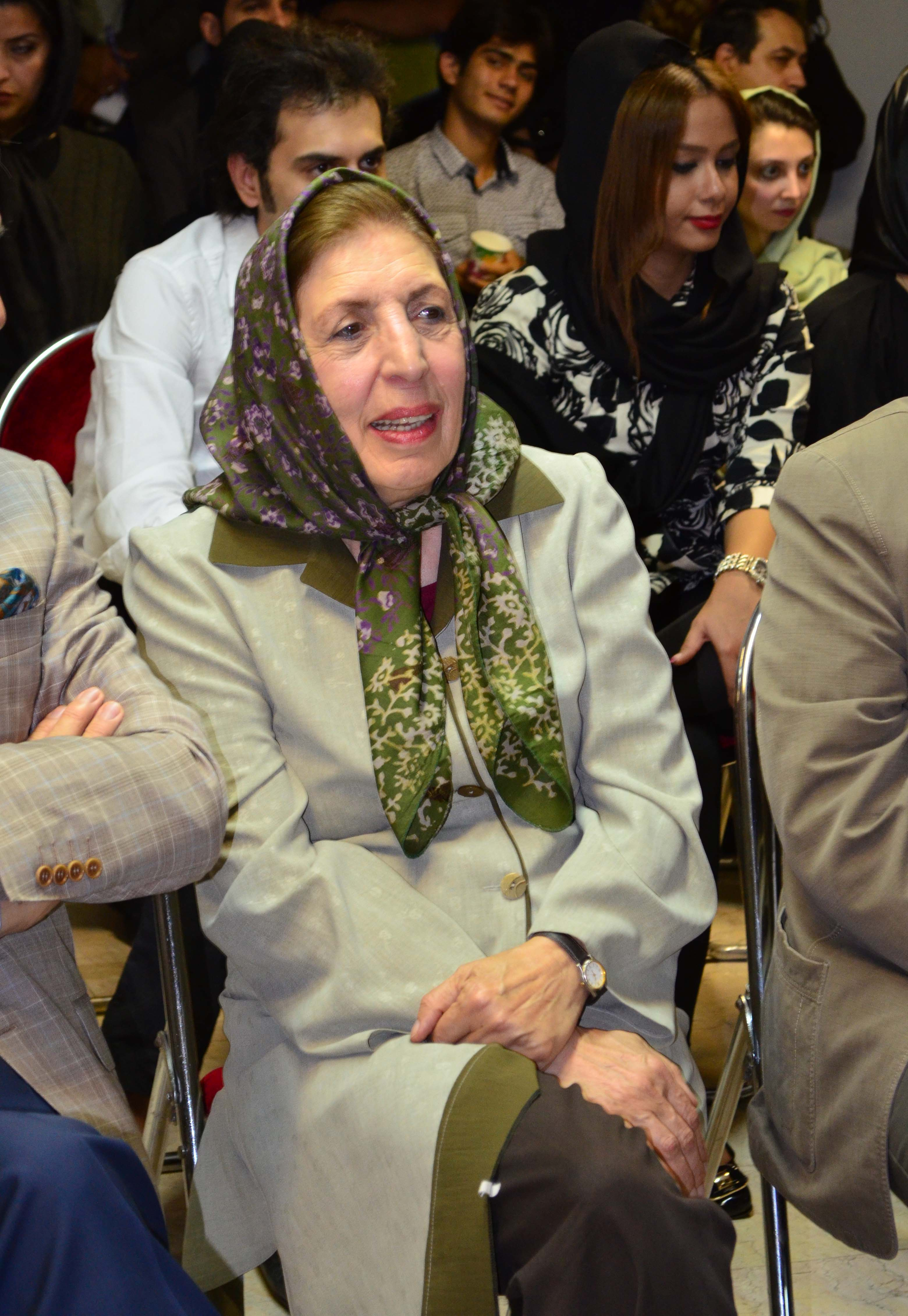
Jaleh Amouzgar: Iranologist and a university professor.

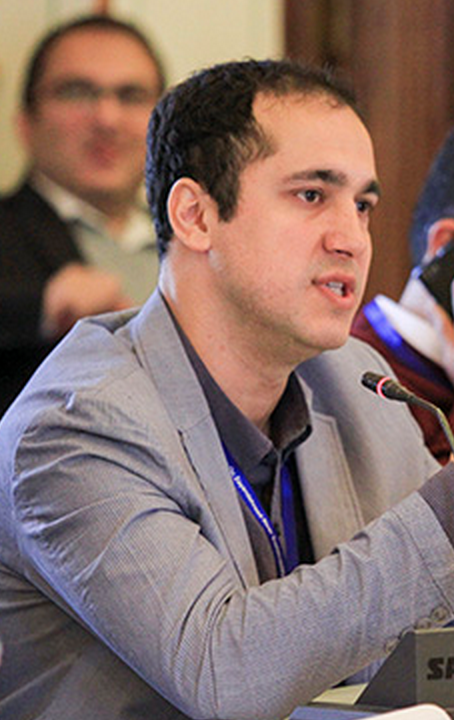
Kaveh Madani: deputy head of Iran's Department of Environment.

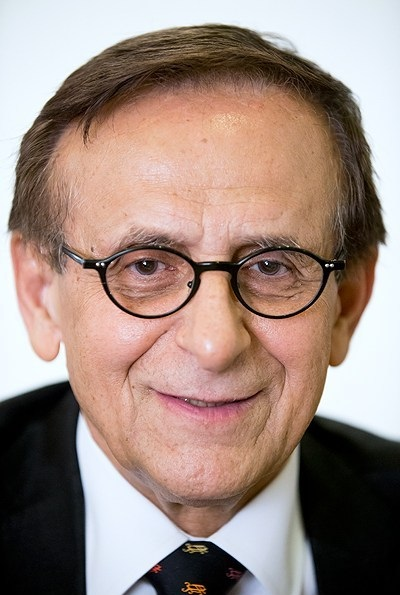
Hooshang Amirahmadi: political analyst, president of the American-Iranian council.

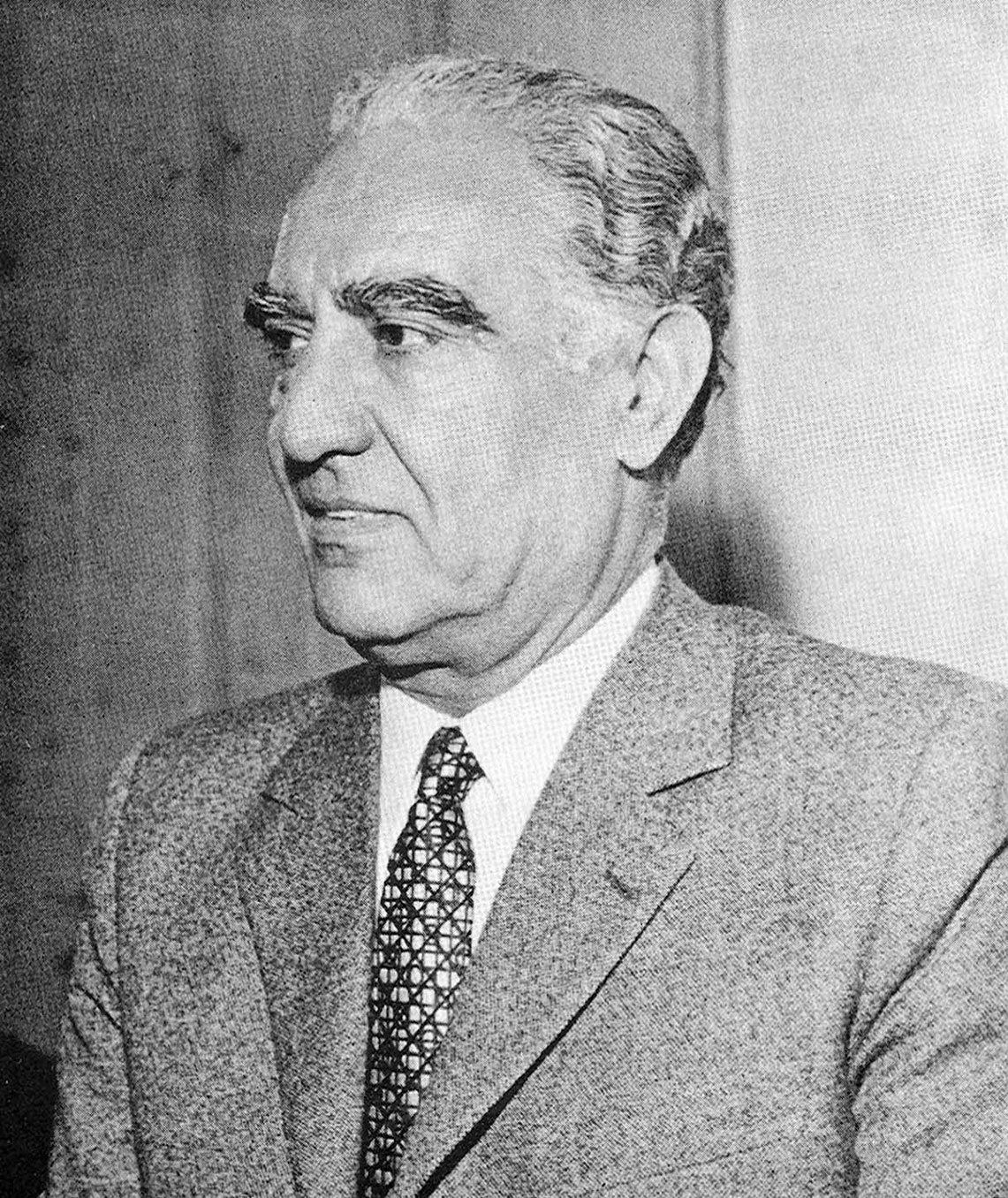
Manouchehr Eghbal: Iranian physician and royalist politician and Prime Minister of Iran.

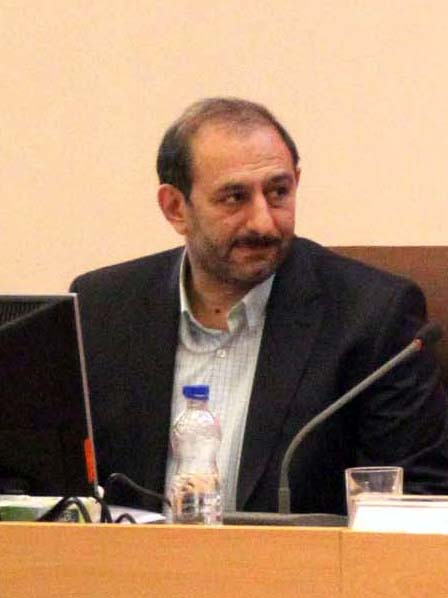
Ali Saeedlou: Vice-president of Iran (presidency of Ahmadinezhad).

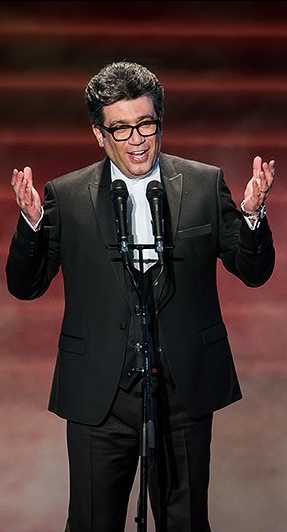
Reza Rashidpour: Iranian pilot, presenter, producer, poet, director and actor.

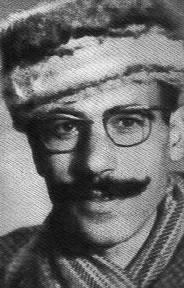
Samad Behrangi: Iranian teacher, social activist and critic, folklorist, translator, and short story writer of Azerbaijani descent.

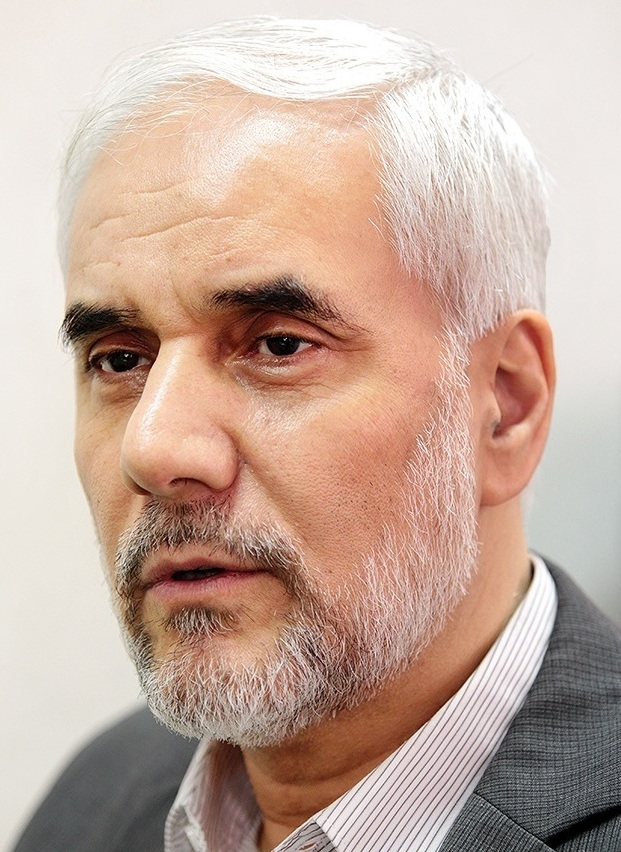
Mohsen Mehralizadeh: the former Governor of Isfahan Province, Vice President of Iran, the head of the National Sports Organization of Iran under President Khatami.

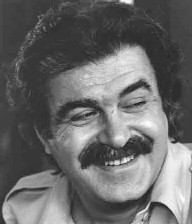
Gholam-Hossein Sa'edi: Iranian writer and a physician.

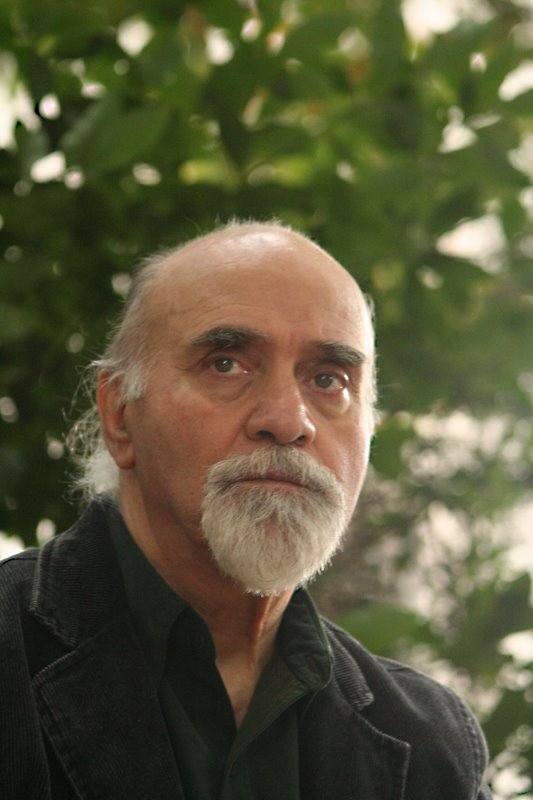
Reza Baraheni: Iranian novelist, poet, critic, and political activist.

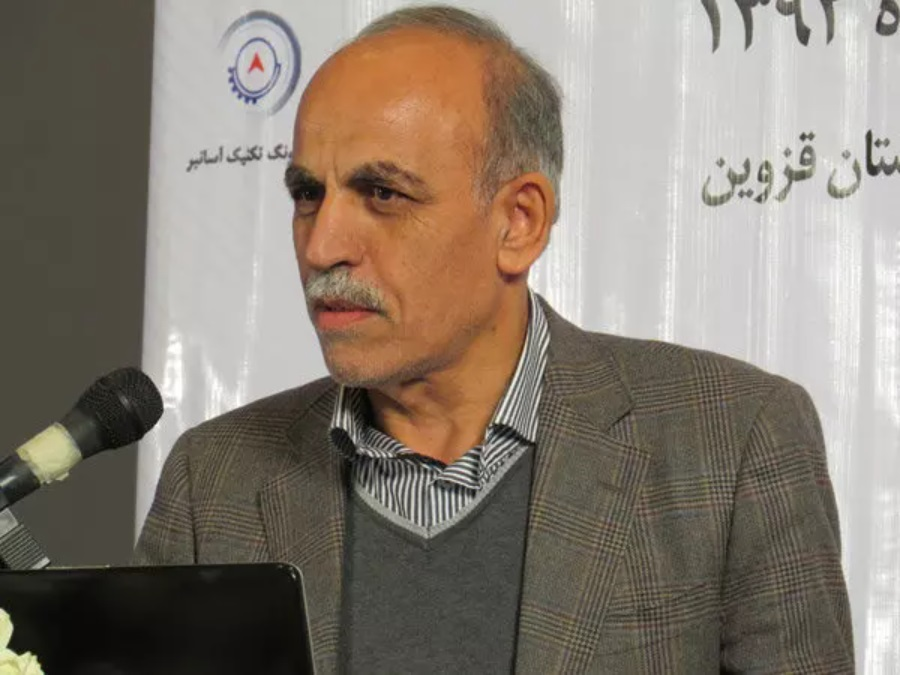
Ali Abdolalizadeh: Iranian reformist politician who held office as the Minister of Housing and Urban Development under President Mohammad Khatami.

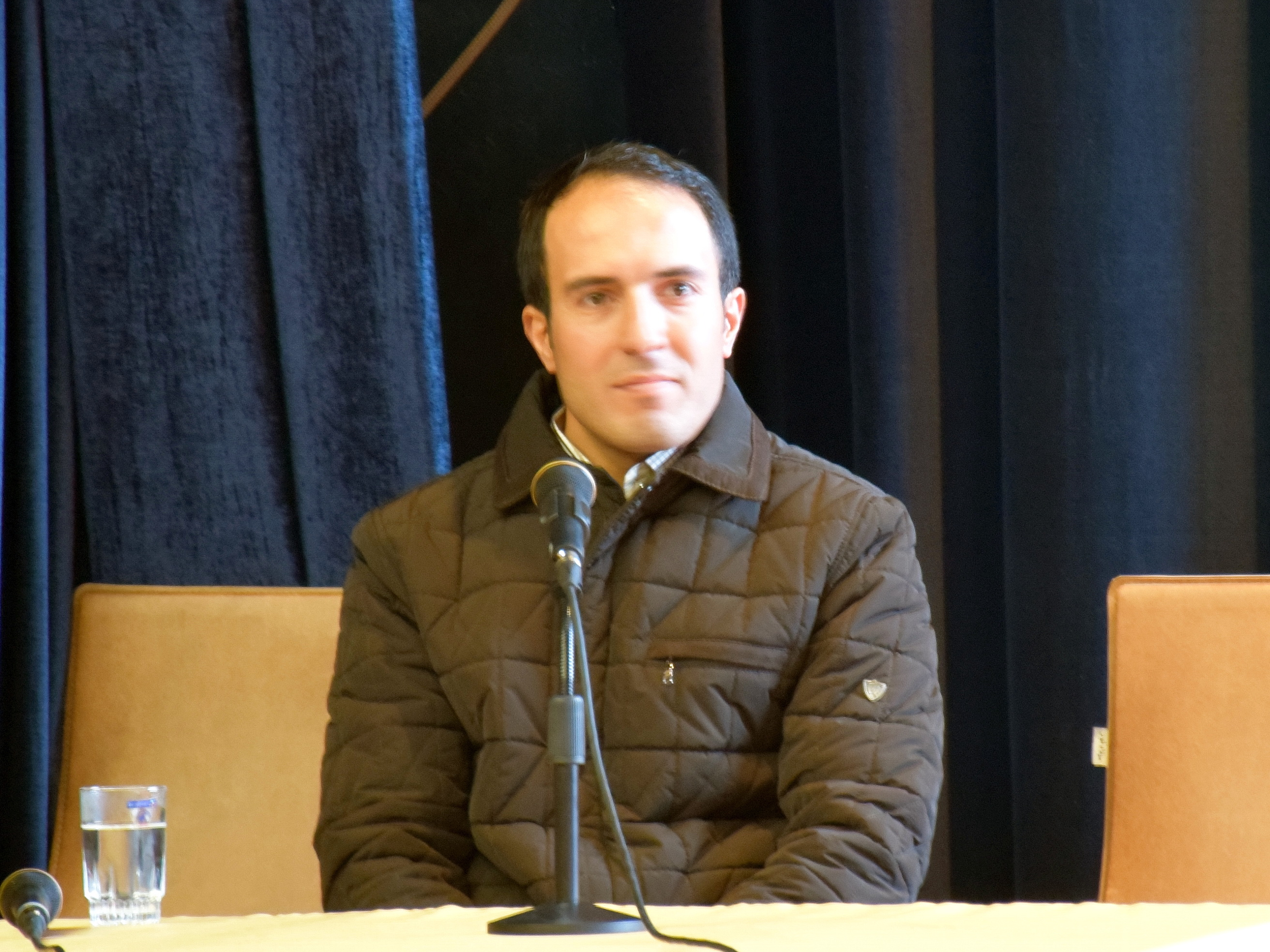
Azim Gheychisaz: Iranian mountain climber and the summiteer of all fourteen Eight-thousanders.

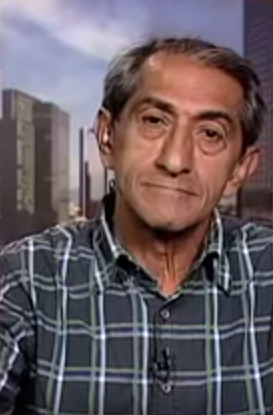
Faraj Sarkohi: Iranian literary critic and journalist, cofounder and editor in chief of the Iranian magazine Adineh.

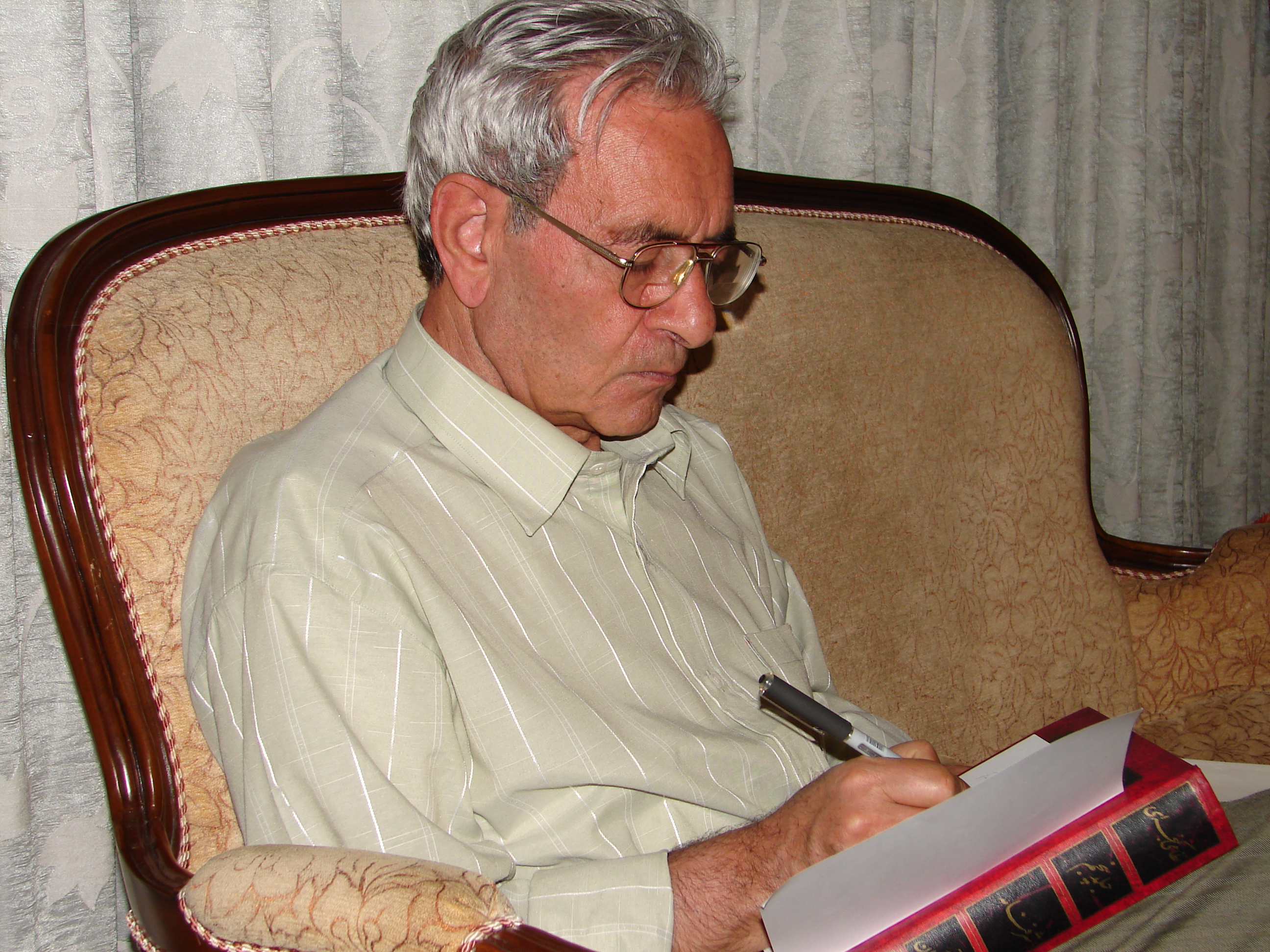
Behrouz Servatian: Iranian literary scholar, professor, and authority on the great Iranian lyric poet, Nizami Ganjavi.

== See also ==
- Education in Iran
- Higher education in Iran
- International rankings of Iran
- Tabriz University of Medical Sciences
- List of Iranian scientists
- Modern Iranian scientists and engineers
