= Ali Akbar Entezami =

Iranian writer (1943–2015)

- Born: 1943; Khoy, Iran
- Died: 18 July 2015 (aged 71–72); Tabriz, Iran
- Education: University of Tabriz & Louis Pasteur University
- Known for: Father's of Iranian Science Polymer
- Scientific career
- Fields: Professor, writer

Ali Akbar Entezami (Persian: علي اكبر انتظامي, 1943 - 18 July 2015) was an Iranian chemist and professor at the University of Tabriz. He received a PhD in Polymer Chemistry from Louis Pasteur University.

== Life ==
Entezami was born 1943 in Khoy, West Azerbaijan, Iran. He died 18 July 2015 in Tabriz. Mohammad-Reza Pour-Mohammadi, President of Tabriz University, Hamid Mirzadeh, President of Islamic Azad University, and Esmaeil Jabbarzadeh, Governor of East Azerbaijan said condolences for his death.
