= Rainer Haag =

German chemist

- Born: 1968 (age 57–58); Darmstadt
- Education: Technical University of Darmstadt, Georg-August University
- Scientific career
- Institutions: Free University of Berlin

Rainer Haag (born 1968) is a German chemist and Chair Professor of Organic and Macromolecular Chemistry at the Free University of Berlin. He conducts research together with his working group on preventing aggressive pathogens and viruses from entering the body's cells using nanotechnology. He heads a team composed of biochemists, physicians, biologists and physicists.

== Life ==
Born in Darmstadt in 1968, Rainer Haag was interested in the mysteries of science from an early age and found valuable support at home. His chemistry teacher at the Darmstadt Justus-Liebig-Gymnasium - a doctorate in chemistry - strengthened and promoted this interest. After graduating from high school with an advanced course in chemistry, Rainer Haag studied at the Technical University of Darmstadt, where he received his preliminary diploma in chemistry in 1989. Three years later he received his main diploma from the Georg-August University in Göttingen, and three years later he received his doctorate there with the distinction summa cum laude. Research stays in Belgium and Israel as well as postdoctoral stays at the University of Cambridge (England) and Harvard University Cambridge (USA) led Rainer Haag deeper and deeper into the world of polymeric nanostructures. Even during these years of training, he received impressive awards and honors for his outstanding achievements, ranging from acceptance into the Studienstiftung des Deutschen Volkes to the Hans von Wartenberg Prize from the Chemical Institute in Göttingen and the award from the Chemical Industry Fund for fast and very successful work studies are enough. In 2001 he received the ADUC-Habilitanden-Prize 2000 from the Gesellschaft Deutscher Chemiker (GDCh) and a little later the Reimund-Stadler-Prize from the specialist group for macromolecular chemistry of the same society.
