= Behrouz Servatian =

Behrouz Servatian بهروز ثروتیان
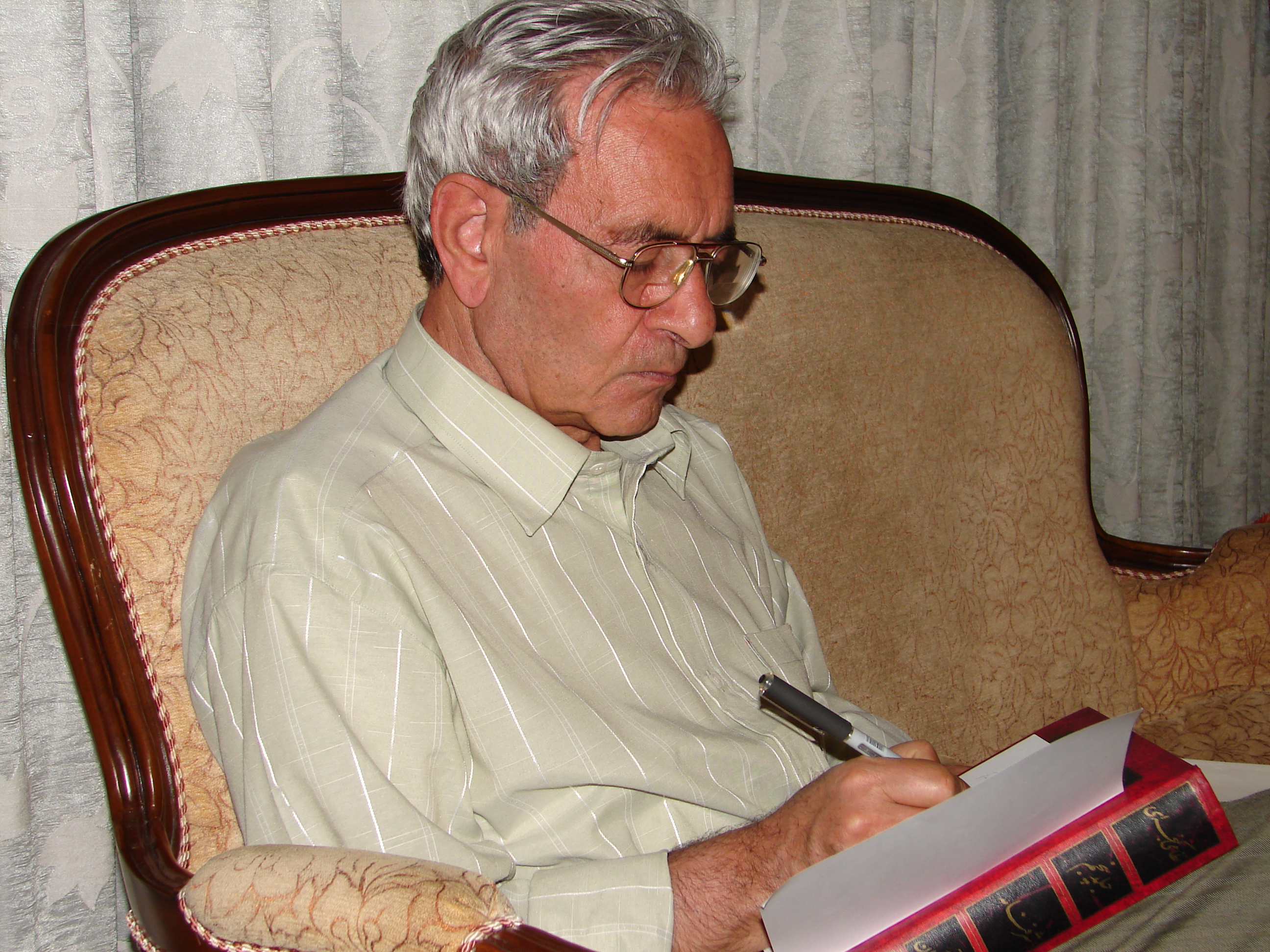
- Behrouz Servatian, March 2006
- Born: October 3, 1937; Miandoab, West Azerbaijan, Iran
- Died: July 29, 2012 (aged 74); Gohardasht, Karaj, Iran
- Occupations: University professor, researcher
- Known for: Studies on Iranian literature, especially about Nizami Ganjavi
- Spouse: Parvin Servatian
- Children: Arash (son); Laleh, Paria, Golnar, Yasaman (daughters)
- Parent(s): Majid Servatian, Sabiyeh Firouzi

Behrouz Servatian (also Romanized as "Behrūz Servatiān", Persian pronunciation: [behˈɾuːz seɾvætiˈyɒːn]; 1937–2012) was an Iranian literary scholar, professor, and authority on the great Iranian lyric poet, Nizami Ganjavi.

== Biography ==
Behrouz Servatian was born in Miandoab, a southern town in West Azerbaijan, northwest Iran. He lived in his home town until he was 24. Having the fifth grade degree in sciences, he served as a mathematics teacher. In 1960 he gained the sixth grade degree in sciences with an average grade of 19.91. In 1963 he sat for the nationwide university entrance exam and, gaining the first place both in Persian language and literature and philosophy at once, he chose the former. With an average grade of 18.2 (of 20), Servatian became the top student at the University of Tabriz in 1966 and was awarded the first-class medal of the Ministry of Science, Research and Technology. Servatian then went back to Miandoab to do cultural services.

In 1972 he did an MA in Persian language and literature from the University of Tabriz. In 1975 he received his doctorate in Persian language and literature from the University of Tehran and was employed there. In 1979 he retired at the University of Tabriz, and from 1986 to 2003 he taught at the Islamic Azad University in Karaj. Servatian spent the last years of his life editing Hafez’ ghazals and working on Safi-Ali-Shah’s Commentary, while writing a number of other works too.

His first book in Persian entitled A Study of "Farr" in Ferdowsi's Shahnameh was published in 1971 by the Foundation of Iranian History and Culture. Most of Servatian's studies are about the great Iranian lyric poet, Nizami Ganjavi. Behrouz Servatian died of a heart attack on 29 July 2012 in Gohardasht, Karaj, Alborz province, Iran at the age of 75 and was buried two days later in Behesht-e Sakineh (Persian: بهشت سکینه) cemetery near Karaj.

Servatian had five children, one son (Arash) and four daughters (Laleh, Paria, Golnar, Yasaman). His third daughter, Golnar, is a cartoonist and book illustrator.

== Research works ==
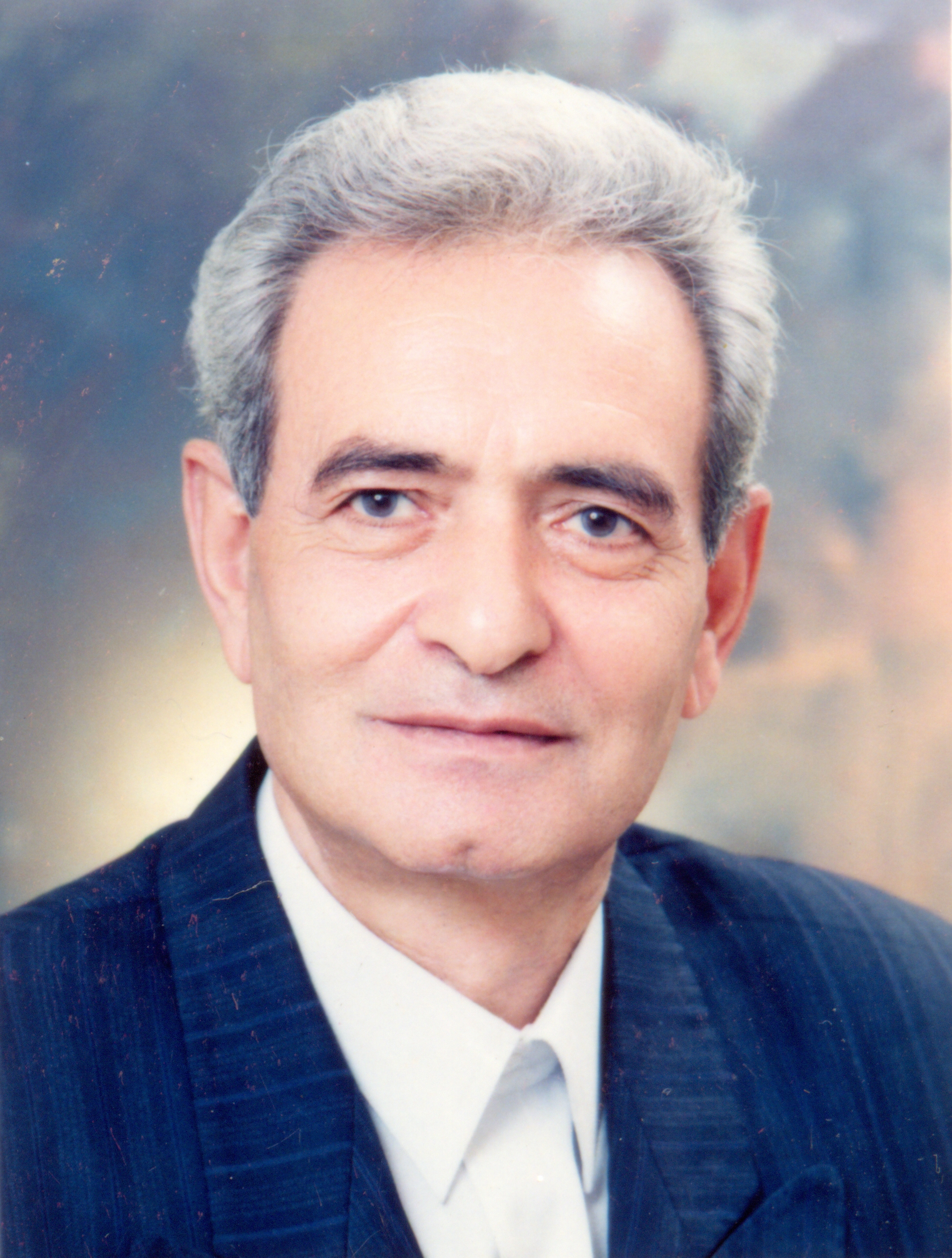
Servatian in 1990s

Servatian wrote and edited more than 50 Persian books, among them the critical edition of Nizami Ganjavi's Khamsa (lit. "The Five Books", in 5 volumes) by him is one of the best editions of the work available to date. The five books are as follows: Makhzan al-Asrar (Persian: مخزن‌الاسرار), Khosrow and Shirin (خسرو و شیرین), Leyli and Majnun (لیلی و مجنون), Haft Peykar (هفت پیکر), and Eskandarnameh (اسکندرنامه).

He also published a commentary of the Diwan of Hafez in 4 volumes, 4000 pages, in 2001 (2nd edition: 2008). Servatian translated the Azeri Turkish famous poem Heydar Babaya Salam by Mohammad-Hossein Shahriar into Persian.

== See also ==
- Nizami Ganjavi
