= Entezam =

Entezam (Persian/Arabic: انتظام) is a Persian surname of Arabic origin (its literal meaning being "discipline", "order") that may refer to

- Abbas Amir-Entezam (born 1933), Iranian politician
- Abdullah Entezam, Iranian diplomat
- Nasrollah Entezam (1900–1980), Iranian diplomat, brother of Abdullah
