= Armenians in France =

Total population
- 650,000 — 950,000 (est.)

Regions with significant populations
- Paris, Lyon, Marseille, Valence

Languages
- French, Armenian

Religion
- Predominantly Armenian Apostolic; Minority Catholic, Evangelical and Atheist

Armenians in France (Armenian: ֆրանսահայեր, romanized: Fransahayer; French: Arméniens de France) are French citizens of Armenian ancestry. The French Armenian community is, by far, the largest in the European Union and the 4th largest in the world, after Armenia, Russia and the United States.

Although the first Armenians settled in France in the Middle Ages, like most of the Armenian diaspora, the Armenian community in France was established by survivors of the Armenian genocide of 1915. Others came through the second half of the 20th century, fleeing political and economic instability in the Middle Eastern countries (Turkey, Lebanon, Syria, Egypt and Iran) and, more recently, from Armenia.

== History ==
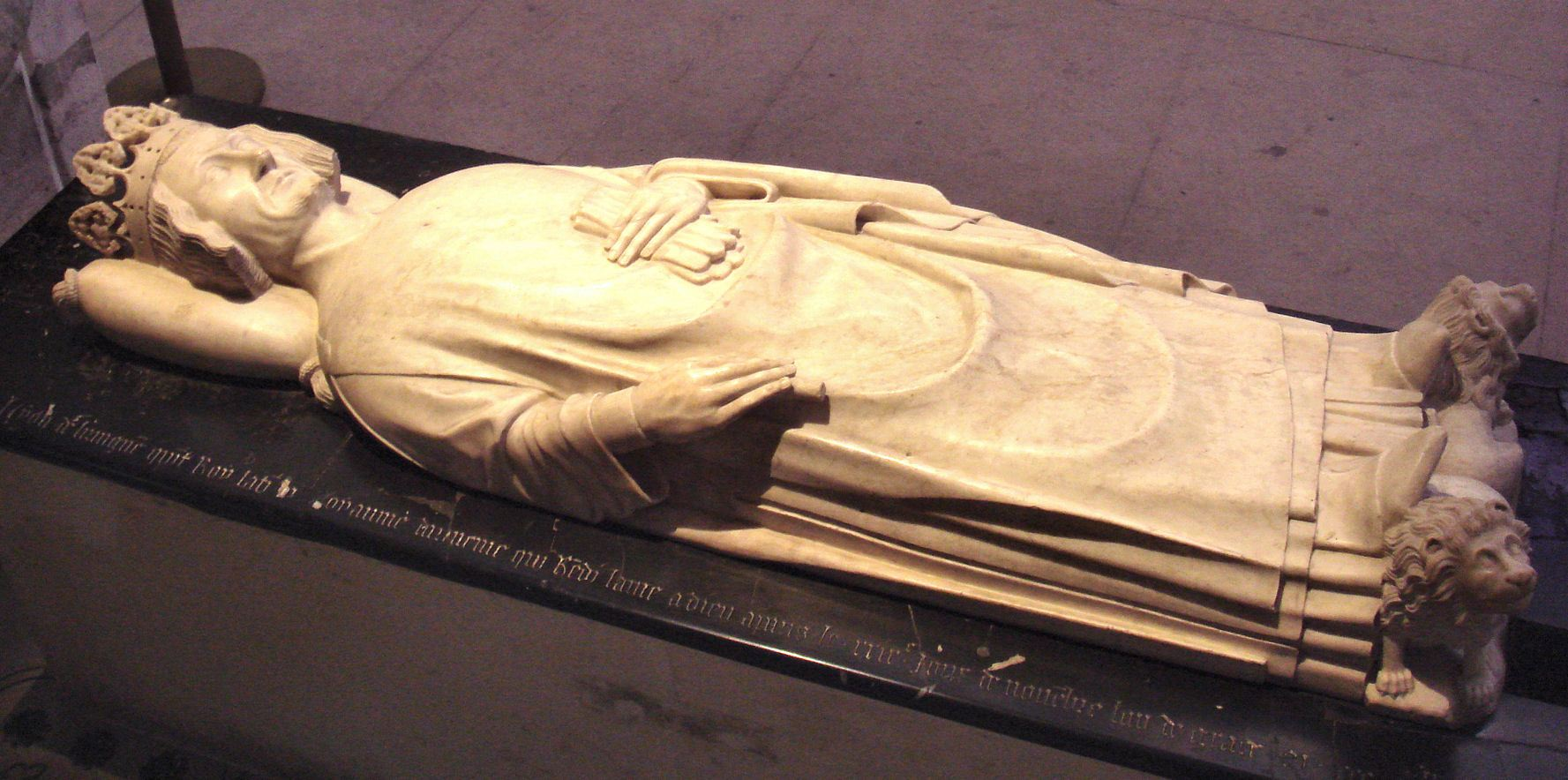
The tomb of Leon V, the last Armenian king, at the Basilica of St Denis

=== Early history ===
Armenians have a long history of settlement in France. The first Armenians appeared in Francia in the Early Middle Ages. In 591, an Armenian bishop named Simon is recorded to have met Gregory of Tours in the city of Tours. Among other churches, the 9th-century church of Germigny-des-Prés—built by Odo of Metz (possibly an Armenian)—is said by architecture historians to have an Armenian influence. The thirty-six letters of the Armenian alphabet found in a Latin inscription at the St. Martha Church in Tarascon show that Armenians lived there before the 13th century, when the last three characters of the Armenian alphabet were added.

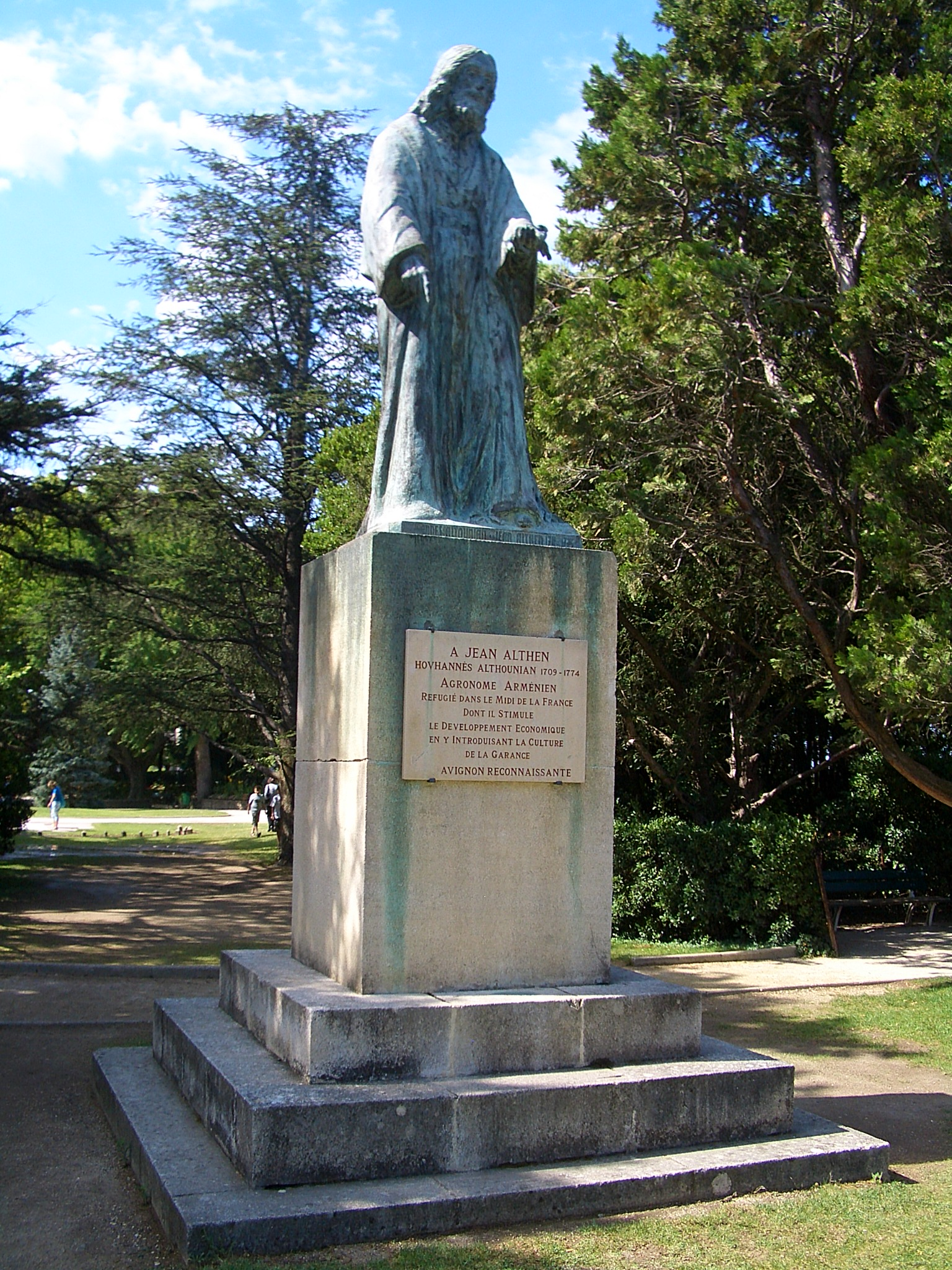
The statue of Jean Althen in Avignon

Contact between Armenians and the French became frequent during the Crusades. The Armenian Kingdom of Cilicia, located on the north-eastern shore of the Mediterranean Sea, became of strategic importance to the crusaders en route to Palestine. Armenian kings Oshin and Leo IV are known to have given special trading privileges to the French. In the 14th century, the Hethumids were unable to retain power in Cilician Armenia and following the assassination of Leo IV in 1341, his Lusignan cousin became King of Armenia as Constantine II. The Lusignan kings were of French origin and ruled the country until 1375 when the last king, Leo V, was captured by the Mamluks and taken to Egypt. He was later released and transferred to France where he died in 1393 and was buried at the Basilica of St Denis, the burial place of the French monarchs.

Since the 15th century, Armenians began migrating to France in small numbers. An Armenian inscription from this period survives on the Bourges Cathedral. In 1672, an Armenian named Pascal (Harut'iwn) opened the first coffee house in Paris. From 1672 to 1686, Voskan Yerevantsi operated a publishing house in Marseille. With the liberalization of the economy, the number of Armenians in France increased and reach 300–400 by 1680. Jean Althen (Hovhannès Althounian), a Persian-Armenian agronomist from Nakhchivan, is known to have introduced madder to southern France in the 1750s. A statue of him was erected in Avignon expressing the city's gratefulness to him. During his campaign in Egypt, Napoleon was presented an Armenian Mamluk named Roustam Raza. He became Napoleon's bodyguard and served him until 1814.

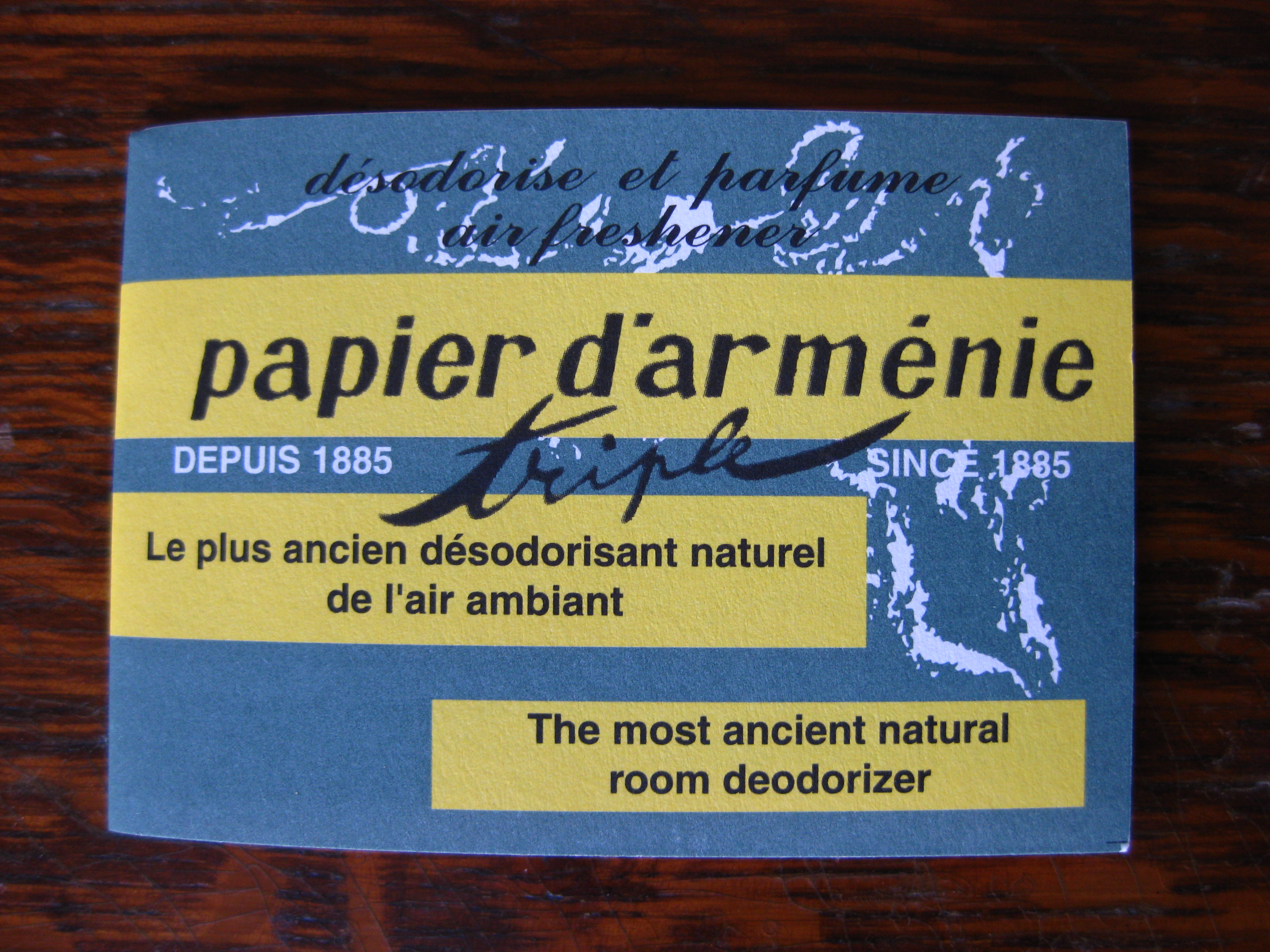
Booklet of Papier d'Armenie

In the 19th century, many young Armenian males (among them poet and political activist Nahapet Rusinian and architect Nigoğayos Balyan) moved to France for education. Papier d'Arménie ("Armenian Paper"), a popular deodorising paper, was created in the late 1880s by Auguste Ponsot. He visited Turkish Armenia and found out that the Armenians use benzoin resin and plant sap to disinfect their homes and churches.

During the late 19th century and early 20th century, thousands of Armenians escaped persecution in their ancestral homeland that was part of the Ottoman Empire at the time. Events like the Hamidian massacres and the Adana massacre gave rise to greater Armenian emigration. By the eve of the First World War, around 4,000 Armenians lived in France.

=== World War I and the Armenian genocide ===
By the 1916 French–Armenian Agreement, the French Armenian Legion was formed out of Armenians from around the world, including many French Armenians, by negotiations between Boghos Nubar and French political and military authorities. The Legion took part in the Sinai and Palestine Campaign and the Franco-Turkish War.

As a result of the Allied victory in the First World War, tens of thousands of survivors of the Armenian genocide found themselves living in the French-occupied part of the Ottoman Empire in Cilicia, and far more in the French Mandate territories of Syria and Lebanon, as the death camps of Deir ez-Zor were in Syria. In 1920, the French army under General Henri Gouraud ordered the French Armenian Legion to lay down their weapons and that the Armenian refugees should leave at once. He had formed a "peaceful, reconstructive policy" with the Turkish nationalists to pull French troops out of Cilicia, but all that ended up doing was allowing attacks against Armenian civilians to resume. Most Cilician Armenian fled alongside the French and were resettled in refugee camps in Alexandretta, Aleppo, the Beqaa Valley (e.g. Anjar) and Beirut. From there, entire families took the opportunity to flee to France. The influx of the Armenian genocide survivors brought tens of thousands of Armenians to France. By the early 1920s, approximately 50,000 to 60,000 Armenians lived in France. According to another source 90,000 genocide survivors settled in France, more than half of whom were villagers.

Most Armenians initially arrived in Marseille, thereafter many of them spread across France and settled in large cities, especially in Paris and the urban areas across the Paris–Marseille railway, notably Lyon. In the Interwar period, the majority of Armenians in France were unskilled villagers that mostly worked in factories for low wages. Between 1922 and 1929, 80% of Armenians in France were labourers earning 10–15% less than Frenchmen.

On 29 October 1920, Grégoire Sinabian was appointed by the Armenian government as the consul-general of Armenia to France.

In this period, a number of Turkish Armenian intellectuals moved to France, including Arshag Chobanian (1895), Komitas (1919, transferred to a hospital in Paris where he remained until his death), Levon Pashalian (1920), Shahan Shahnour (1923).

=== World War II and the Fourth Republic ===
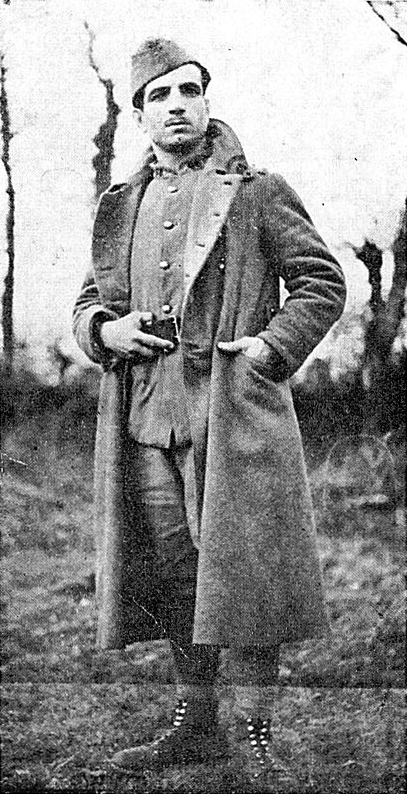
Manouchian during the Second World War

The Armenian community of France played an active role in the French Resistance. Poet and communist militant Missak Manouchian, the commander of the multiethnic Groupe Manouchian, became an important Resistance leader. Besides Arpen Lavitian, the other executed Armenian member, his group also included many Jews from across Europe. Poets Kégham Atmadjian and Rouben Melik were other prominent participants in the Resistance. The Anti-Fascist Underground Patriotic Organization was commanded by Armenian officers.

Resisters Alexander Kazarian and Bardukh Petrosian were awarded by the highest military orders of France by General Charles de Gaulle.

Another Resistance fighter, Louise Aslanian, a famous writer and poet, was a recruiter for the Francs-Tireurs et Partisans in a combat cell of the French Communist Party. She along with her husband Arpiar Aslanian worked in an underground publishing house and actively engaged in supplying fighters of the French Resistance with weapons. Louise opened the women's division of the French Resistance and was responsible for the Armenian Resistance in Northern France. She and her husband were arrested on 24 July 1944 and were later killed in Nazi concentration camps.

Henri Karayan, a member of the Manouchian Group, participated in the illegal distribution of Humanité in Paris and was engaged in the armed struggle until the Libération.

In 2012, 95-year-old Arsène Tchakarian, the last survivor of the Manouchian resistance group who fought against occupying Nazi German forces during World War II, was decorated as Officer of the Legion of Honor by President Nicolas Sarkozy.

Immediately after the Second World War, about 7,000 Armenians were repatriated to Soviet Armenia.

=== Migration of Armenians from the Middle East ===
Langues du monde (1952) estimated 70,000 Armenians in France.

Thousands of new immigrants have arrived in France from Middle Eastern countries like Turkey, Lebanon, Syria and Iran since the 1950s. These new immigrants mobilized the French Armenian community. By the 1980s around 300,000 Armenians lived in France.

In 1983, the Armenian Secret Army for the Liberation of Armenia launched an attack at the Paris Orly airport, as part of its campaign for the recognition of and reparations for the Armenian genocide. The explosion killed eight people and injured fifty-five. The campaign to pass the resolution condemning the Armenian genocide at the European Council unleashed on June 19, 1987, at a Strasbourg demonstration.

=== Contemporary period ===
The devastating earthquake in Armenia on 7 December 1988 led to a huge mobilization of the French Armenian community. Among others, Charles Aznavour established a charitable foundation to help the victims of the earthquake.

As the Institut national d'études démographiques, France's national statistics agency, does not collect data on ethnicity there is no reliable information about the number of French people of Armenian ancestry. Various experts, media and organizations have estimated the number of French Armenians to be 250,000, 300,000, 400,000, 450,000, 500,000, 500,000–700,000, 750,000. As of 2005, there were 12,355 Armenian-born people residing in France.

== Culture ==
=== Language and education ===
SIL Ethnologue as of 2009 estimated that Armenian is spoken by around 70,000 people in France. Most French Armenians speak Western Armenian, while a minority (recent Armenian immigrants from Armenia and Armenians from Iran) speak Eastern Armenian.

Today, Armenian classes are organized in many localities with full bilingual kindergartens and primary schools near Paris and Marseille attended by several thousand children and youths. Armenian is currently a valid option counting toward the Baccalaureate, the French High School certificate.

=== Religion ===
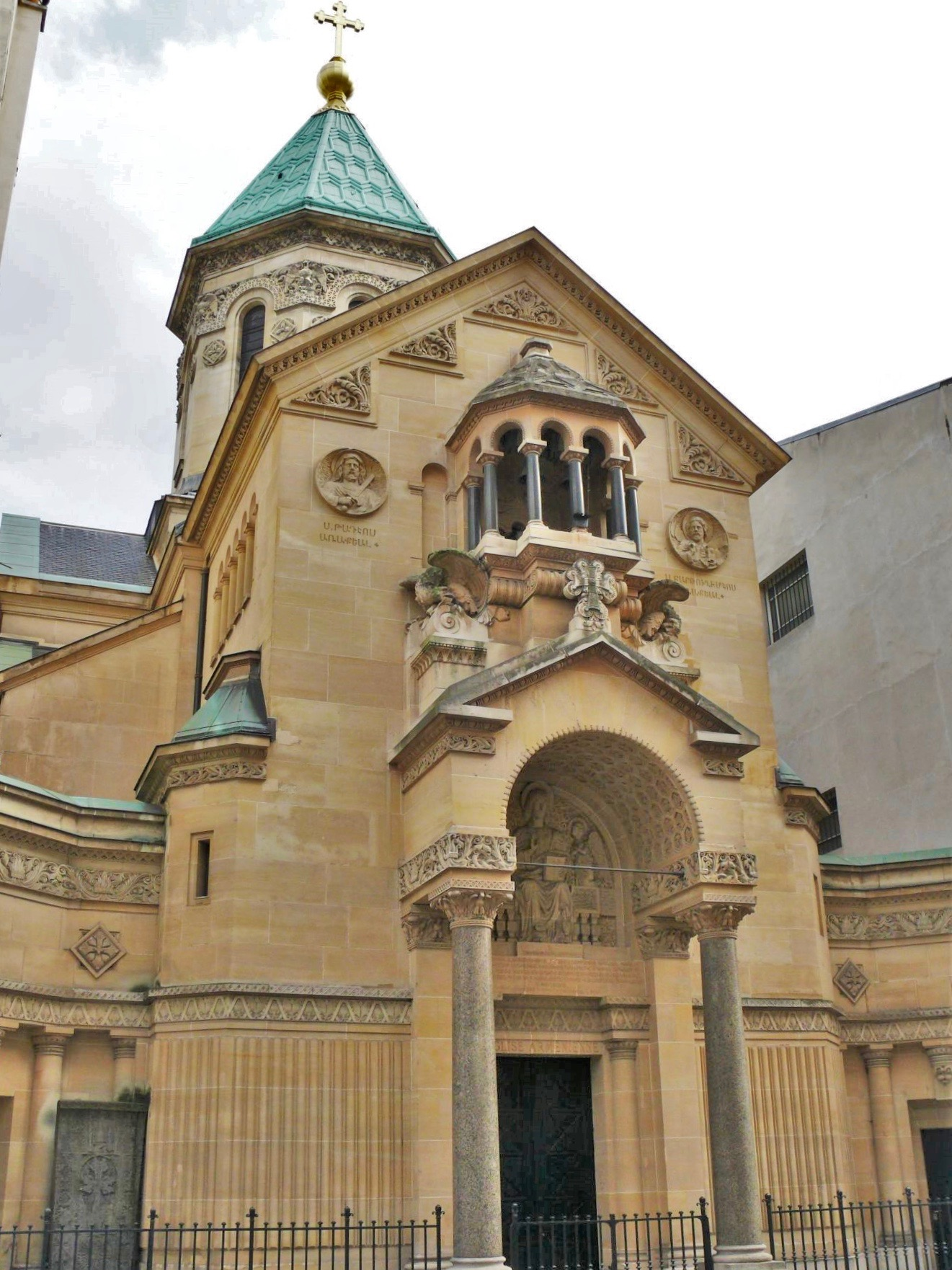
St. John the Baptist Cathedral in Paris

The majority of the Armenian French population is of the Armenian Apostolic (Orthodox) faith and belong to the Mother See of Holy Etchmiadzin of the Armenian Apostolic Church. A minority of Armenians belong to the Catholic faith and are adherents of the Armenian Catholic Church. An estimated 5,000 Armenian Evangelicals live in France.

Each of the three Armenian Churches has its own organization in France. The Diocese of France the Armenian Apostolic Church under the spiritual guidance and jurisdiction of the Catholicos of All Armenians. The Diocese has its own Youth movement l'Association de la jeunesse de l’Eglise apostolique arménienne de France, which has chapters in the various 26 parishes of the Diocese.

The Eparchy of Sainte-Croix-de-Paris depends on the Armenian Catholic Church, and the Armenian Evangelical Churches Union of France, part of the Armenian Evangelical Church.

=== Institutions ===
The Armenian General Benevolent Union, one of the largest Armenian organizations in the world, was headquartered in Paris between 1922 and 1940.

The Armenian Social Aid Association, operating Armenian retirement homes, was founded before this period and is unique to France. National institutions, and first and foremost the Armenian Church of Paris founded in 1905, were very soon to co-exist in Paris, playing a fundamental role in defending and protecting the refugees.

In the municipalities with a high concentration of Armenians, there are a lot of associations in a vast array of fields ranging from the cultural (e.g. Maison de la culture arménienne de Décines in Décines, near Lyon or Radio AYP FM, in Paris), social (e.g. Maison des étudiants arméniens in Paris), sports (e.g. Union de la jeunesse arménienne d'Alfortville and Union Sportive de la Jeunesse d'Origine Arménienne de Valence football clubs), or more specific like the Association nationale des anciens combattants et résistants arméniens.

There are also umbrella organizations, the Forum des associations arméniennes de France, created in 1991, and the Conseil de coordination des organisations arméniennes de France, new name since 2001 of the « Comité du 24 avril ».

=== Media ===
Press

The first Armenian journal in France began publishing in 1855. As of 1991, around two hundred Armenian newspapers and magazines have been published in France, more than any other European country. Currently, the only daily newspaper is Nor Haratch, an independent publication that started publishing on October 27, 2009, on the basis of 2 issues per week. It replaced Haratch (Յառաջ), a daily founded in 1925 by Schavarch Missakian that stopped publication in May 2009.

Online media

- Nouvelles d'Arménie magazine
- France-Arménie magazine

Broadcasting

- AYP FM, radio station operating in Paris and Île-de-France
- Radio Arménie, radio station operating in Lyon and the surrounding area
- Radio Gayané, radio station

== France and the Armenian genocide ==
France is one of the countries that has recognized the Armenian genocide. There are monuments dedicated to the genocide victims in several cities in France, including Paris, Lyon, and Marseille.

The French Senate passed a bill in 2011 that criminalizes denial of acknowledged genocides, which includes both the Holocaust and the Armenian genocide. The bill was submitted by the parliament in 2012. However, the bill was considered unconstitutional on 28 February 2012 by the French Constitutional Court: "The council rules that by punishing anyone contesting the existence of ... crimes that lawmakers themselves recognised or qualified as such, lawmakers committed an unconstitutional attack on freedom of expression,".

According to a 1996 survey in France, 69% of respondents were aware of the Armenian genocide, of which 75% agreed that the French government should officially recognize it.

On 24 April 1965, 10,000 Armenians marched on Champs-Elysées to commemorate the fiftieth anniversary of the genocide.

== Notable French Armenians ==
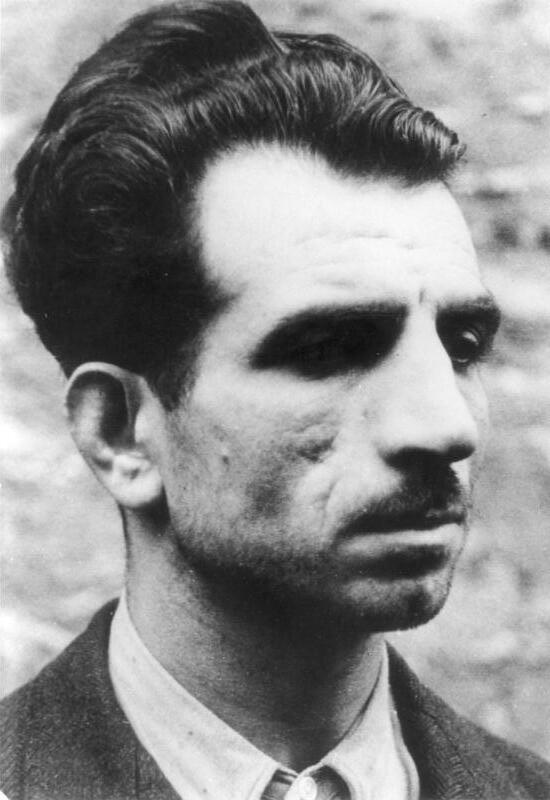
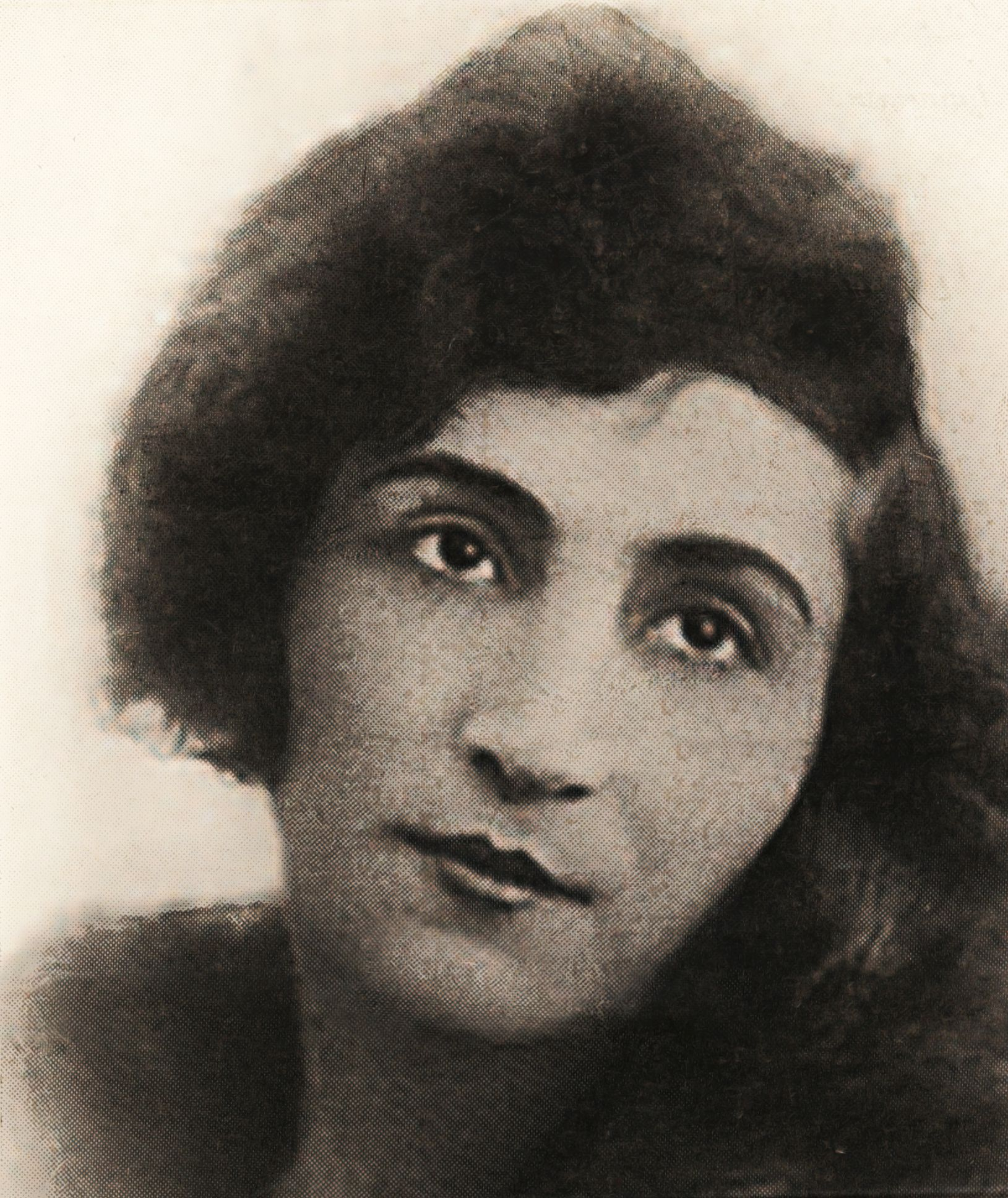
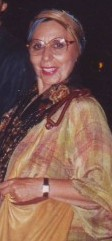
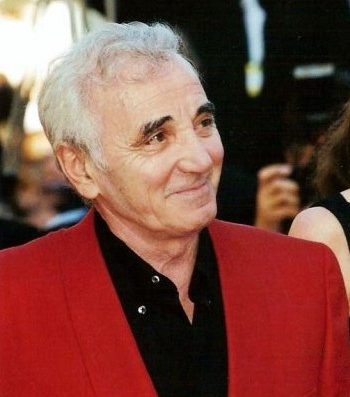
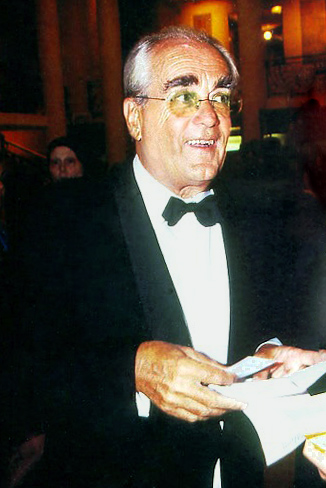
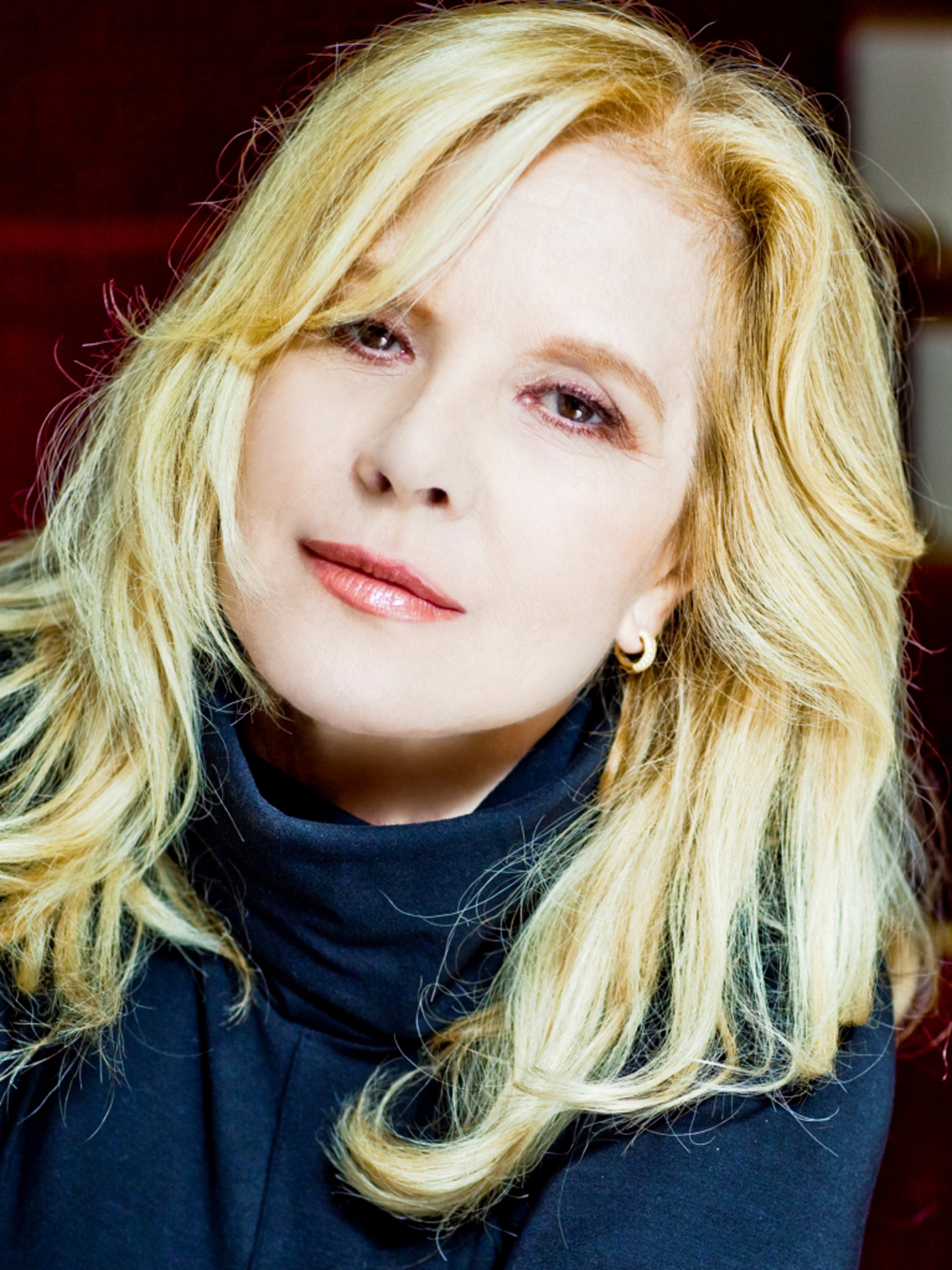
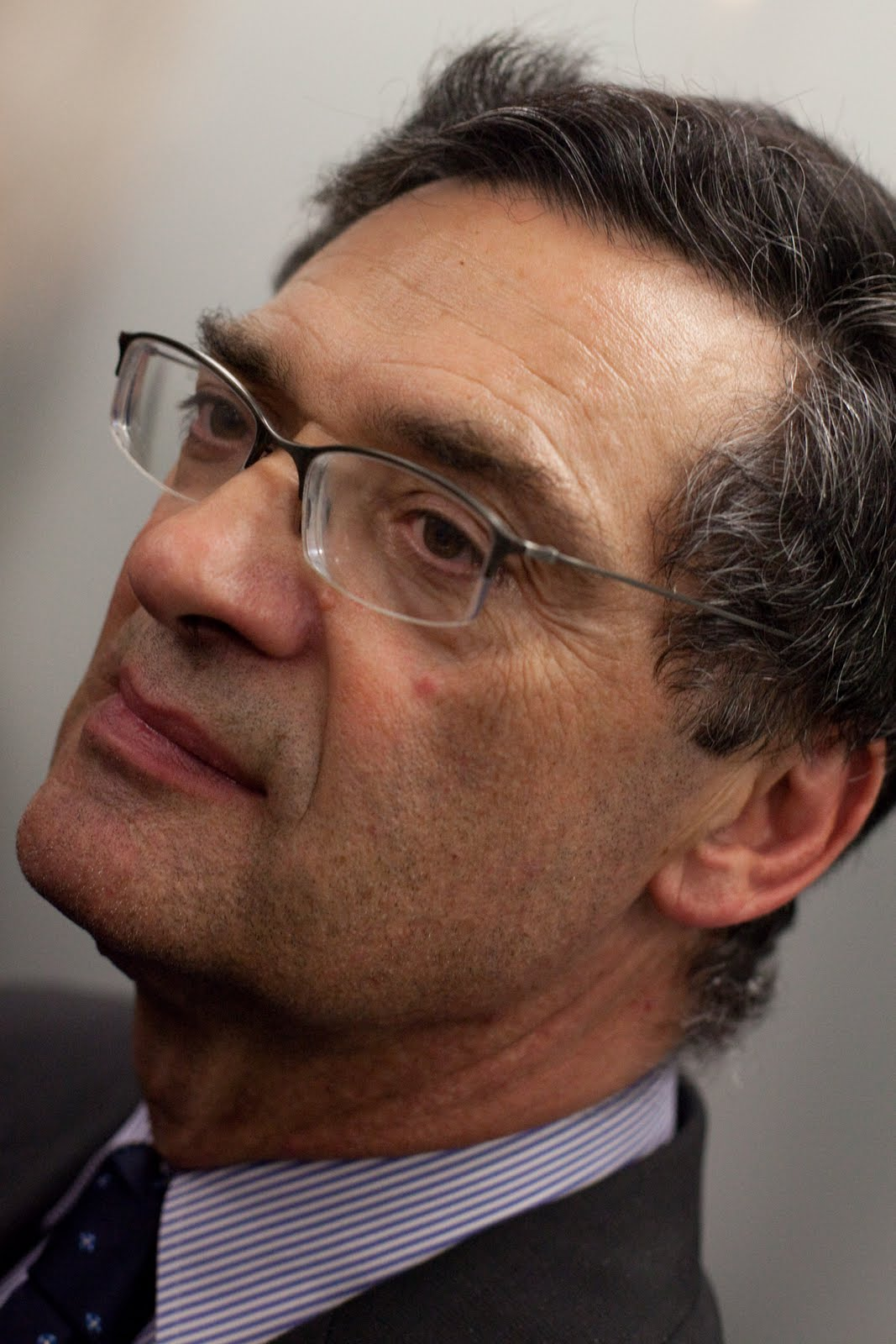
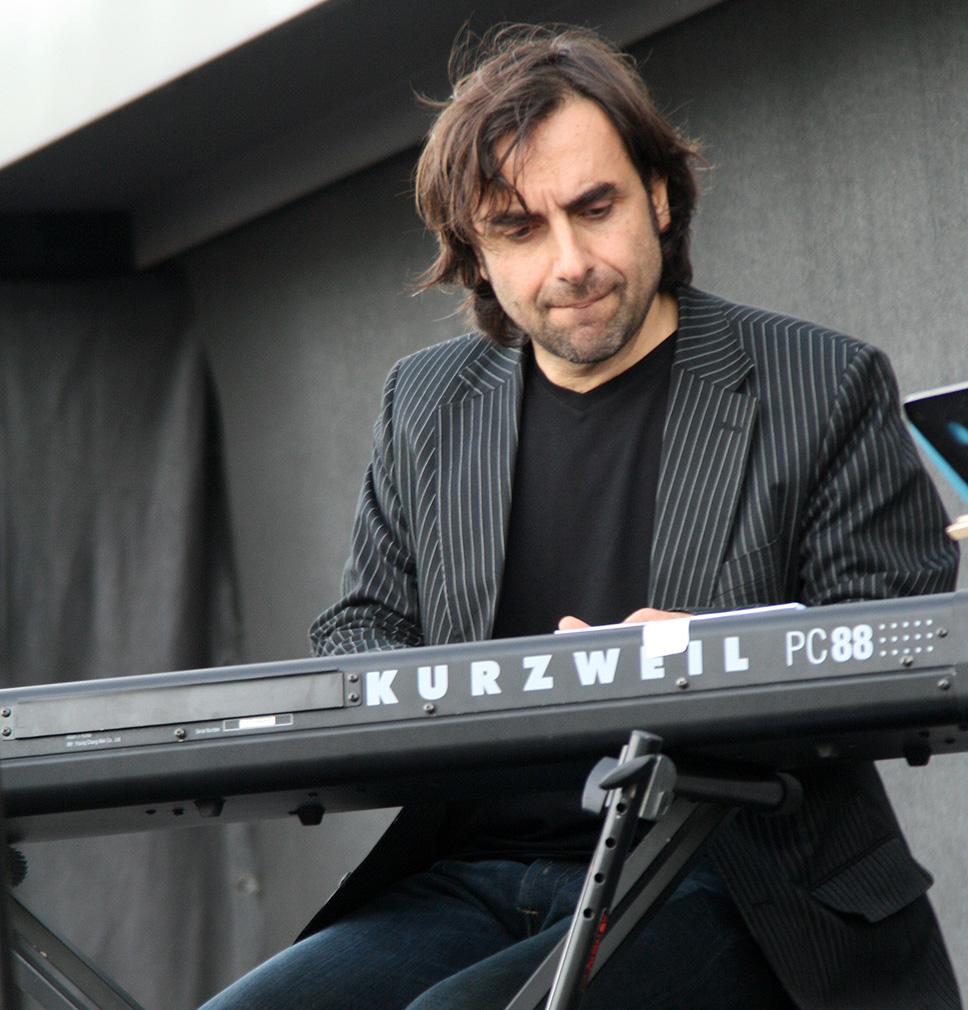
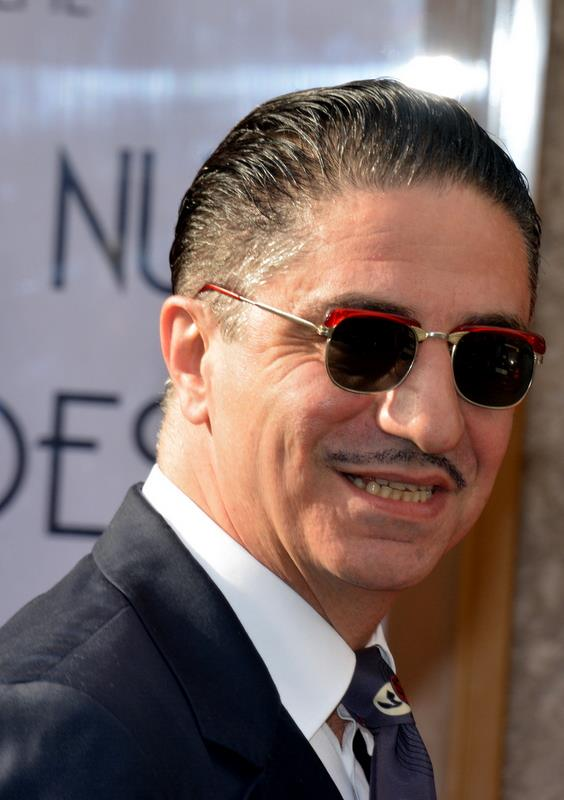
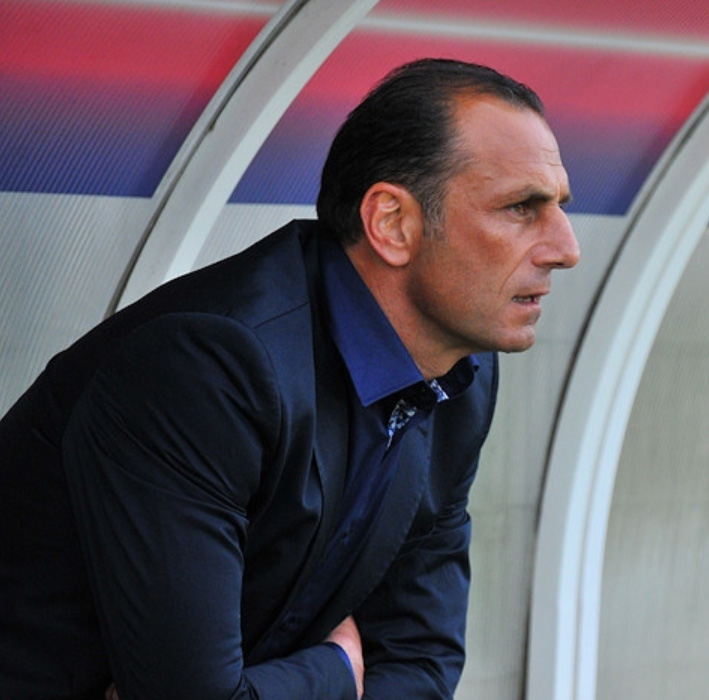
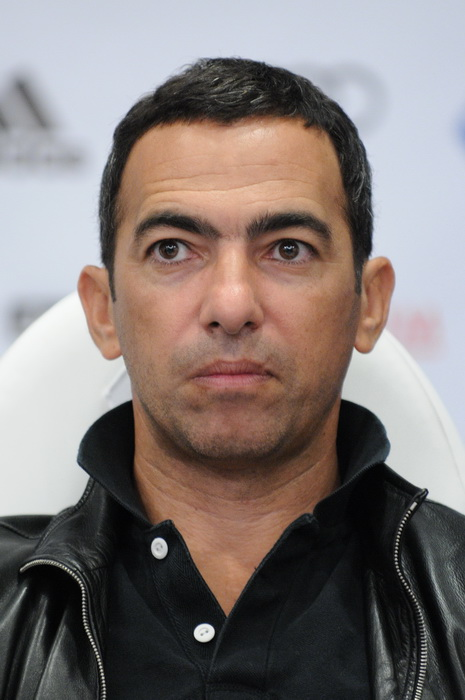
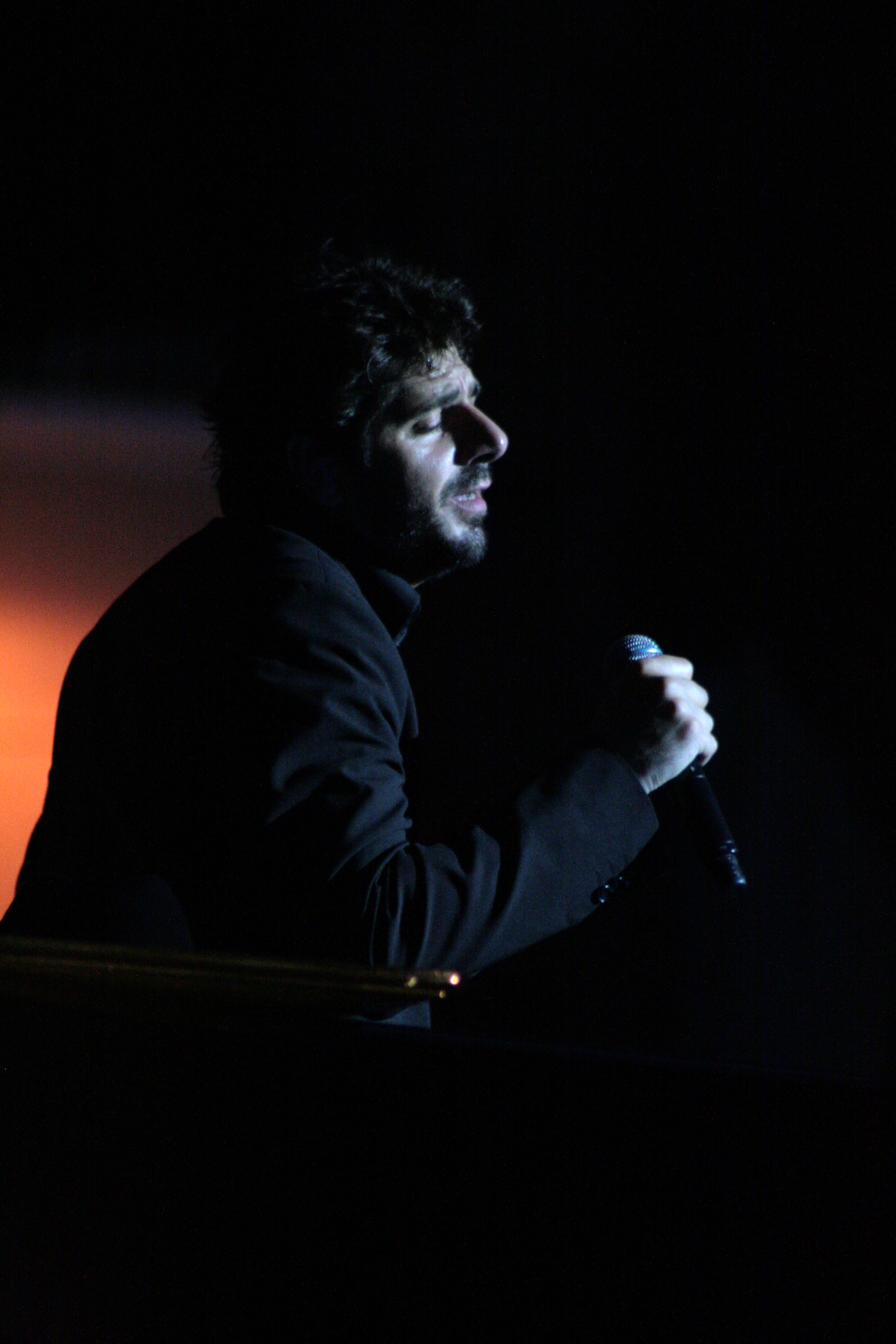
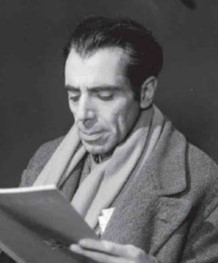
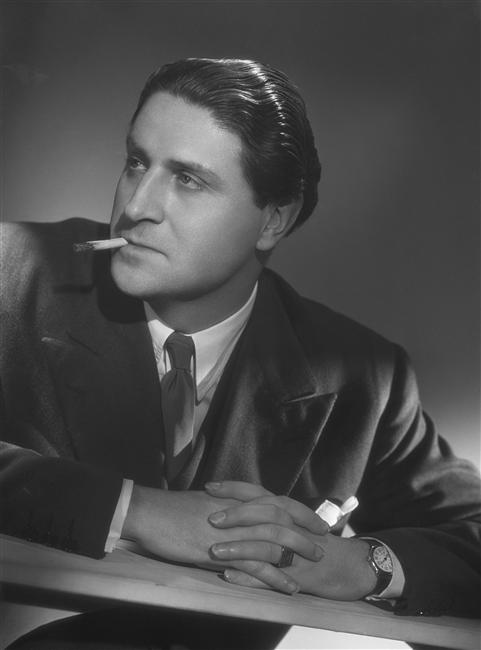
Missak Manouchian	Louise Aslanian	Alice Sapritch	Charles Aznavour	Michel Legrand	Sylvie Vartan	Patrick Devedjian
André Manoukian	Simon Abkarian	Michel Der Zakarian	Youri Djorkaeff	Patrick Fiori	Arthur Adamov	Henri Troyat

=== Entertainment ===
- Alice Sapritch (1916–1990), Turkish-born actress
- Henri Verneuil (1920–2002), Turkish-born film director
- Isabelle Sadoyan (1928–2017), actress
- Catherine Robbe-Grillet (b. 1930), actress
- Francis Veber (b. 1937), director (Armenian mother)
- François Berléand (b. 1952), actor (Armenian father)
- Alain Berberian (1953–2017), director
- Robert Guédiguian (b. 1953), film director, screenwriter, producer
- Serge Avédikian (b. 1955), Armenian-born film and theatre actor and director
- Vardan Petrosyan (b. 1959), Armenian-born actor, French citizen
- Pascal Légitimus (b. 1959), comedian (Armenian mother)
- Simon Abkarian (b. 1962), actor
- Michael Vartan (b. 1968), actor
- Mathieu Madénian (b. 1976), humorist, actor and columnist
- Raffy Shart, director and musician

=== Literature, theatre, journalism ===
- Arthur Adamov (1908–1970), Russian-born playwright
- Louise Aslanian (1906–1945), writer, poet, Resistance fighter, communist
- Nina Berberova (1901–1993), writer who chronicled the lives of Russian exiles in Paris
- Philippe Djian (b. 1949), writer
- Henri Troyat (1911–2007), writer
- Vahé Katcha (1928–2003), writer, screenwriter, journalist
- Jean-Claude Kebabdjian (b. 1942), editor and journalist, founder and director of the Centre de Recherches sur la Diaspora Arménienne

=== Music ===
- Jacques Hélian (1912–1986), composer, arranger, conductor of big band orchestra (Armenian father)
- Rosy Armen (b. 1923), singer
- Charles Aznavour (1924–2018), singer
- Marc Aryan (1926–1985), singer, composer, producer
- Michel Legrand (1932–2019), composer (Armenian mother)
- Georges Garvarentz (1932–1993), composer
- Lévon Sayan, (b. 1934), impresario, producer, and operatic tenor
- Danyel Gérard (b. 1939), singer (Armenian father)
- Sylvie Vartan (b. 1944), singer (Armenian father)
- François Kevorkian (b. 1954), music producer and remixer
- André Manoukian (b. 1957), songwriter, musician
- Nariné Simonian (b. 1965), organist, pianist, musical director and producer of opera
- Patrick Fiori (b. 1969), singer (Armenian father)
- Helene Segara (b. 1971), singer (Armenian mother)
- Alain Altinoglu (b. 1975), conductor
- Essaï Altounian (b. 1980), singer and keyboardist, represented Armenia in the 2015 Eurovision Song Contest as part of Genealogy.
- Anna Kasyan (b. 1981), Georgian-born opera singer, soprano
- Liz Sarian, singer
- Jakhlin Baghdasaryan, singer of duo Ladaniva representing Armenia in the Eurovision Song Contest 2024 in Malmö

=== Painters ===
- Edgar Chahine (1874–1947), painter
- Léon Arthur Tutundjian (1905–1968), painter
- Jean Carzou (1907–2000), Syrian-born painter
- Jean Jansem (1920–2013), painter
- Melik Ohanian (b. 1969), painter

=== Politics ===
- Arpiar Aslanian (1895–1945), communist militant and French Resistance fighter during World War II
- Missak Manouchian (1906–1944), poet, communist militant and French Resistance hero during World War II
- Édouard Balladur (b. 1929), politician, former Prime Minister, 1995 presidential candidate
- Patrick Devedjian (1944–2020), politician, mayor of Antony, Hauts-de-Seine, cabinet minister
- Hilda Tchoboian
- Gérald Darmanin, Minister of the Interior (2020–)
- Sarah Tanzilli, deputy
- Arsène Tchakarian was the last surviving member of the Manouchian Group

=== Sports ===
- Alain Prost (b. 1955), race driver, four-time Formula One Drivers' Champion (Armenian mother)
- Éric Assadourian (b. 1966), footballer
- Youri Djorkaeff (b. 1968), footballer (Armenian mother)
- Alain Boghossian (b. 1970), footballer (Armenian father)
- Nicolas Minassian (b. 1973), race driver
- Dimitri Yachvili (b. 1980), rugby union player (Armenian mother)
- Cyriaque Rivieyran (b.1991), footballer
- Gaël Andonian (b. 1995), footballer
- Ida Adamoff (1910–1993), tennis player

=== Miscellaneous ===
Science

- Vazken Andréassian (1903–1995), aeronautical engineer
- Agop Terzan (1927–2020), astronomer
- Patrick Donabédian (b. 1953), art historian

Business

- Serge Tchuruk (b. 1937), former CEO and chairman of Alcatel
- Alain Manoukian (b. 1946), fashion designer
- Alain Mikli (b. 1955), designer
- Michel Mossessian (b. 1959), architect
- Rafi Haladjian (b. 1961), entrepreneur
- Francis Kurkdjian (b. 1969), fragrance creator
- Paul-Louis Arslanian, director of French Air Accidents Bureau

Other fields

- Anita Conti (1899–1997), explorer and photographer, first French female oceanographer

=== Fictional characters ===
- Ana Khesarian, a character in The Promise (2016). Historian Pietro A. Shakarian wrote in The Nation that Ana represented the wealth held by the Armenians in France, with her wishes highlighting "affinities of the prosperous Armenian urban class for Europe."

== See also ==
- Armenia–France relations
- French branch of the Armenian Relief Committee
- Armenian Press in France
