= Jean Jansem =

French painter

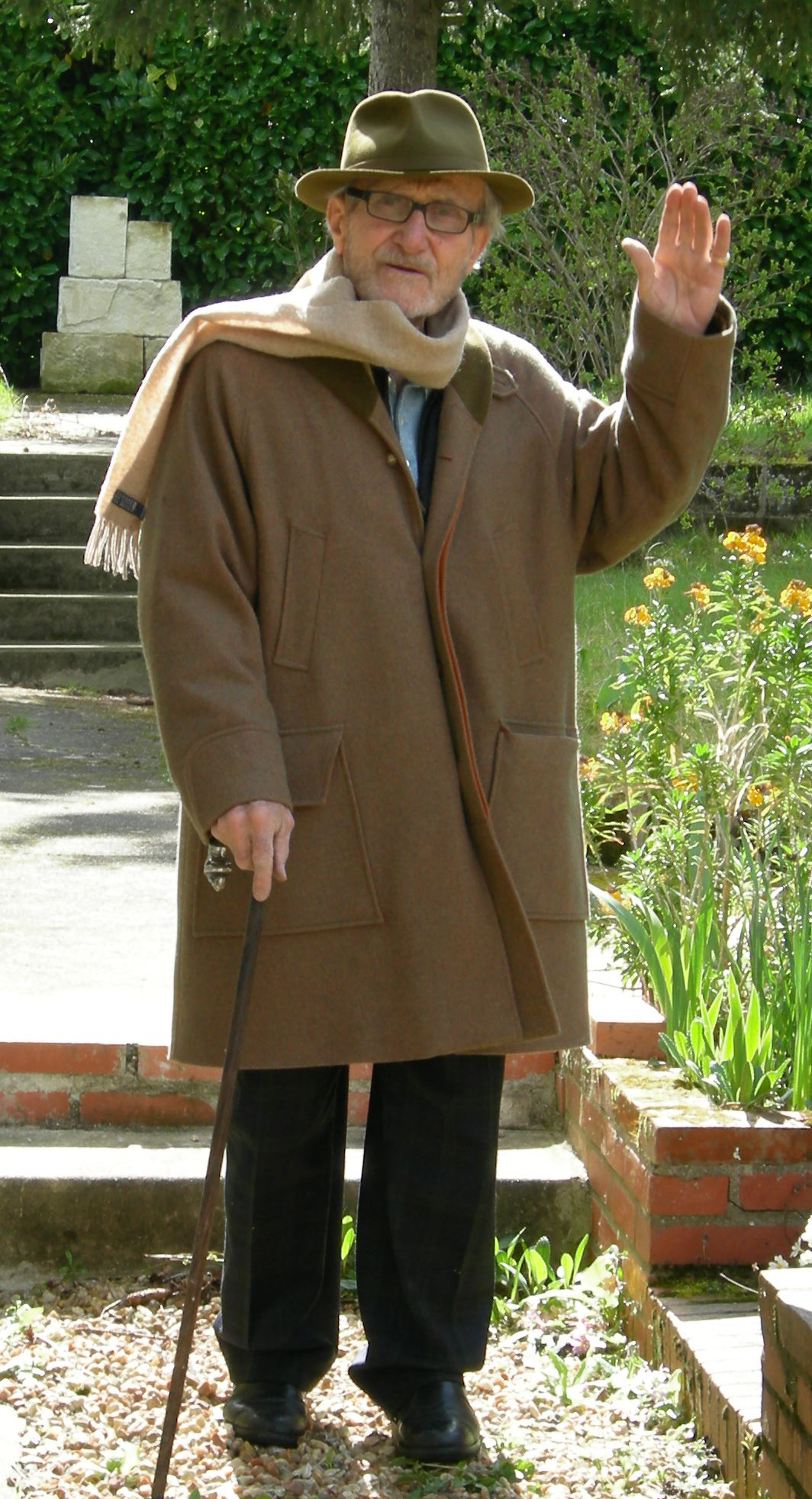
- Jansem in 2008
- Born: Hovhannes Semerdjian; 9 March 1920; Bursa, Ottoman Empire
- Died: 27 August 2013 (aged 93)
- Citizenship: France
- Occupation: Painter
- Website: www.jansem.net

Hovhannes "Jean" Semerdjian (Armenian: Հովհաննես "Ժանսեմ" Միրիջանի Սեմերջյան, 9 March 1920 – 27 August 2013), also known as Jean Jansem, was a French-Armenian painter. Jansem's artworks are internationally known, and are part of museum collections throughout France, Japan and the United States. A Foreign member of the National Academy of Sciences of Armenia (2002).

He was awarded by the Ordre des Arts et des Lettres in 1953 and by the Knight of the French Legion of Honour in 2003. The President of Armenia awarded Jansem a Medal of Honor for his “reinforcement of Armenian-French cultural ties.”

== Biography ==
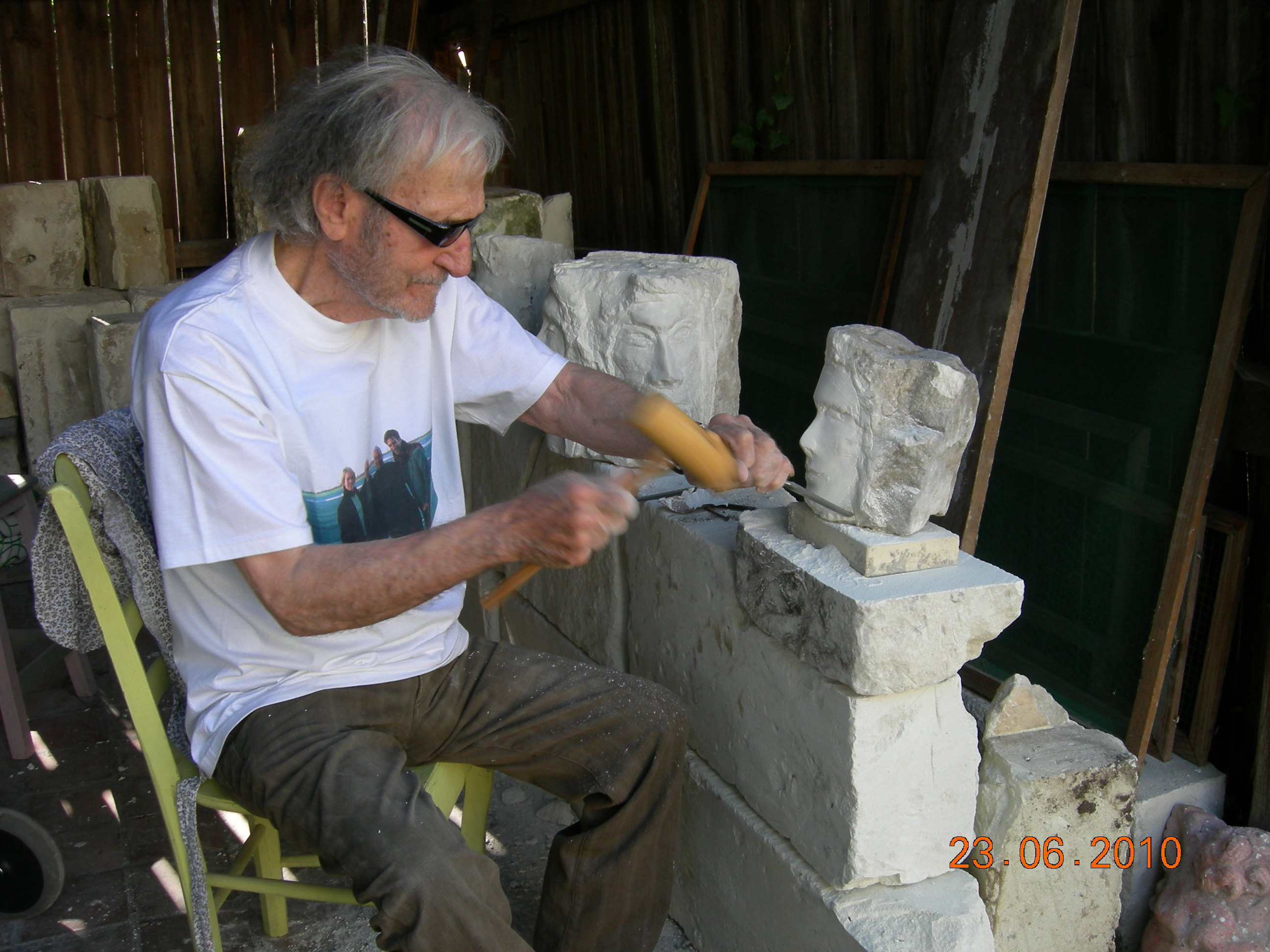
Jansem in 2010

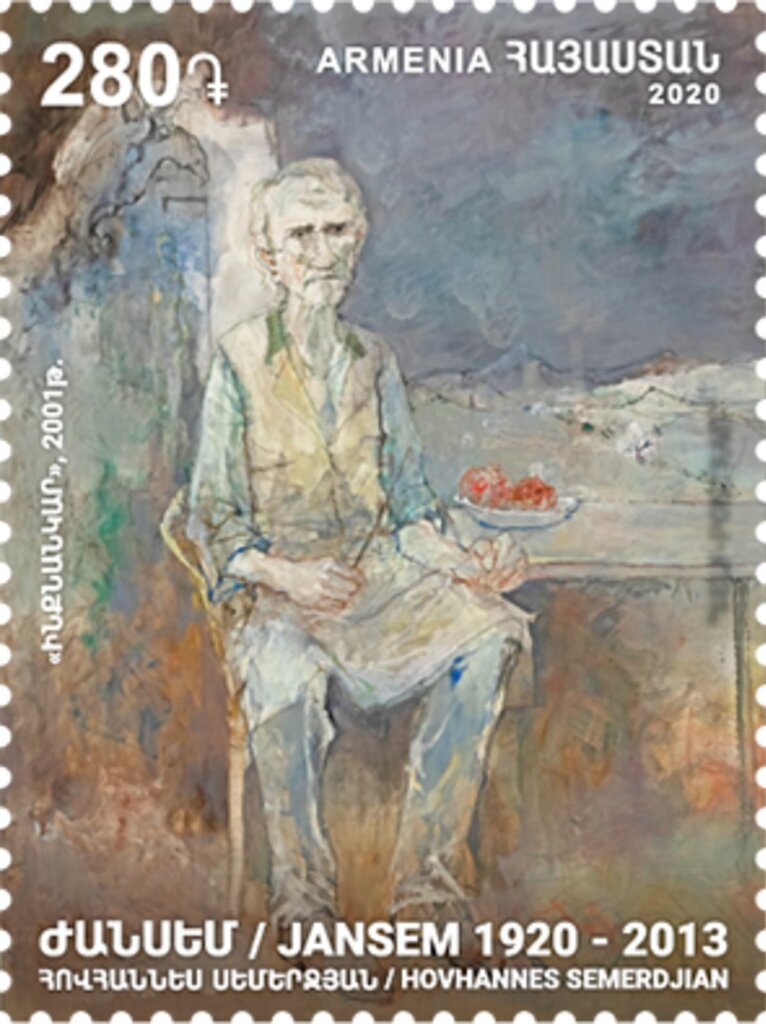
Self-portrait on a 2020 stamp of Armenia

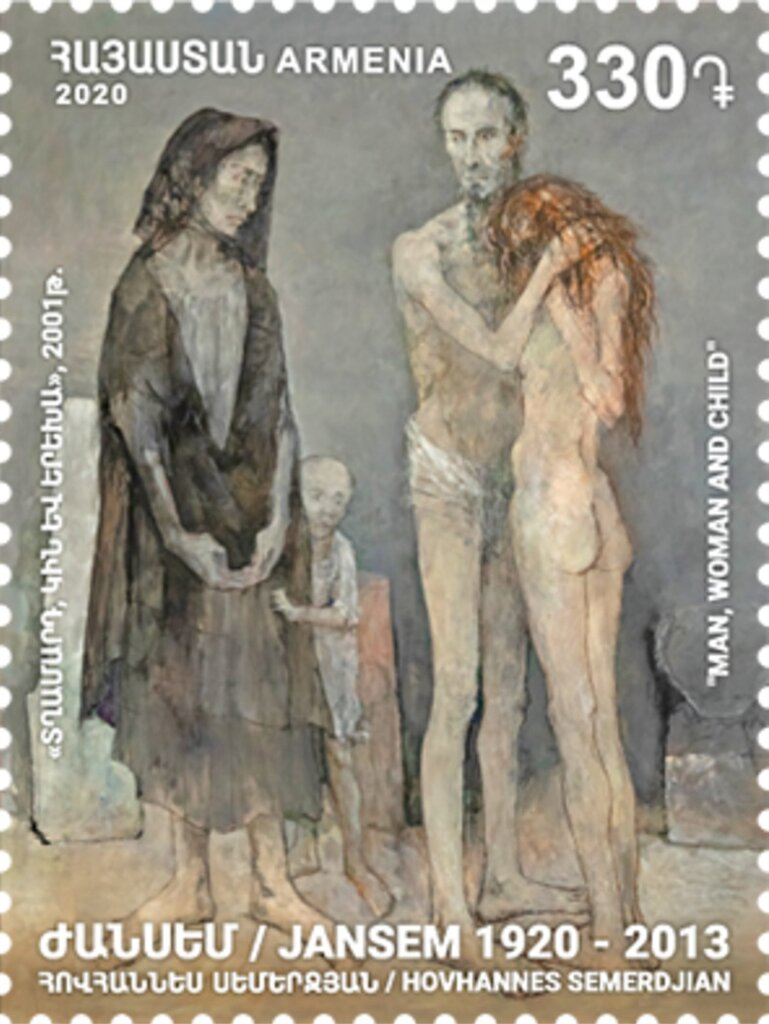
Man, woman and child on a 2020 stamp of Armenia

Hovhannes Semerdjian was born in 1920 in Bursa, in the then Ottoman Empire. In 1922, his family fled to Greece. He spent his childhood in Thessaloniki. They arrived to Issy-les-Moulineaux suburb of Paris, France in 1931 when he was 11 and that is when he began to paint. The first professional schools for Jansem became free academies of Montparnasse (1934–1936). He studied in the Ecole des Arts Decoratifs. His teachers were Brianshon, Legjon and Udon. Jansem also studied at the Sabatie studio for a year. Early paintings by Jansem were mainly to national issues. He had individual exhibitions in Paris, New York, Chicago, London, Tokyo, Rome, Brussels, Lausanne, Beirut etc. Hovhannes Semerdjian was elected the President of the Young Artists' Saloon in 1956.

He won the Comparison prize in Mexico in 1958. In Japan, two museums were built to honor Jansem′s work, located in Tokyo Ginza and Nagano Prefecture Azumino. In 1973 he visited Armenia for the first time. In 2001, 34 of his paintings were given to the Armenian Genocide Museum.

The act of painting reveals who we are. We are betrayed by what we love.

— Jean Jansem

Jansem’s primary sources of inspiration were Goya and Brueghel. His mother and his children were the main heroes in his earlier works. Jansem was characterized as a miserablist, an artist of unfortunate people.

On 10 March 2010, the day after Jansem's 90th birthday, during a visit to France, the President of Armenia awarded Jansem a medal of honour saying the following, "Our nation is proud of you and values highly your art. While living outside Armenia, you have made our country more recognizable, extending our nation's good name all over the world."

Jansem died on 27 August 2013, aged 93, outside Paris.

== Awards ==
- Ordre des Arts et des Lettres (1953),
- Prix Comparaison (1958, Mexico),
- prize of the Biennale (1962, Bruges),
- Panamanian prize «Vahagn» (2002),
- Mesrop Mashtots Medal (2002),
- Legion d'honneur (2003),
- Order of Honour (2010, Armenia).
