= Order of Honour (Armenia) =

- The insignia of the Order of Honour
- Type: Civil order
- Awarded for: Notable services in protecting the state and national interests of the Republic of Armenia, strengthening independence and democracy, promoting friendship with Armenia, and making a significant contribution to peace between peoples
- Country: Armenia
- Presented by: President of Armenia
- Eligibility: Armenian and foreign citizens, collectives, diplomatic representatives, religious leaders, philanthropists, and public figures
- Status: Active
- Established: 6 July 2000
- Service ribbon

Precedence
- Next (higher): Order of St. Mesrop Mashtots
- Next (lower): Order for Services to the Fatherland

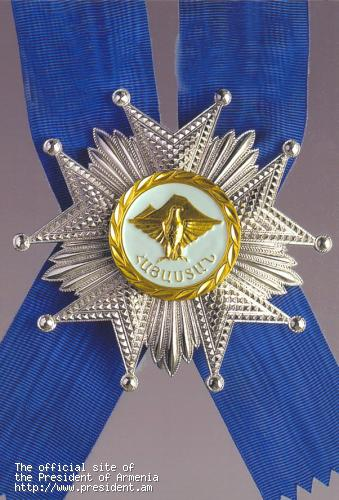
The Order of Honour.

The Order of Honour (Armenian: Պատվո շքանշան) is a state award of Armenia. It was established on July 27, 2000. It is offered for special services to the protection of the state and national interests of Armenia, to its independence and to the strengthening of democracy, as well as for significant contribution to the establishment, strengthening and development of friendship with Armenia and the promotion of peace between nations.

== Criteria ==
The Order of Honour is awarded to:

- Heads of states and governments of foreign countries
- Diplomatic representatives of foreign countries
- Foreign political, economic, cultural and public figures, philanthropists
- Representatives of international organizations who are not citizens of Armenia
- Foreign religious figures

The ribbon of the order is azure blue.

== Recipients ==
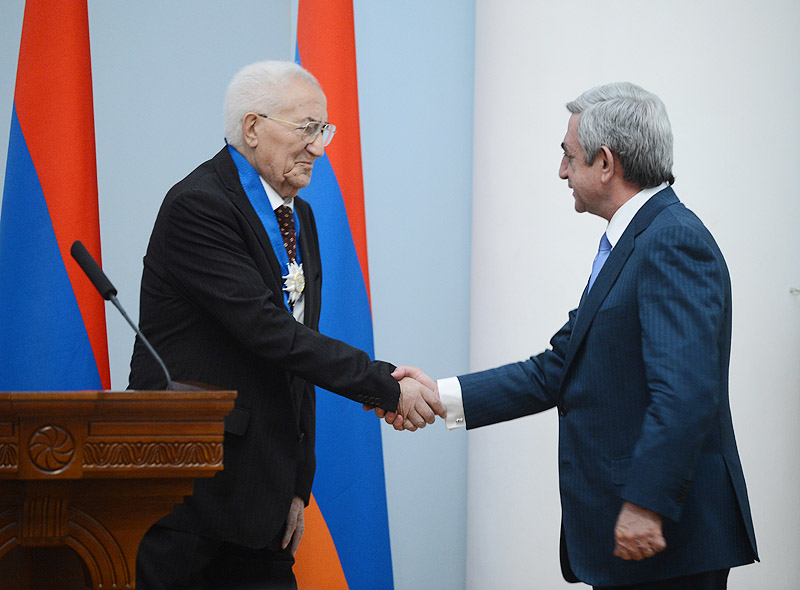
President Serzh Sargsyan awarded the Order of Honour to the prominent state figure Vladimir Movsissian.

- Tony Iommi
- Karen Shakhnazarov
- Nikita Simonyan
- Armen Dzhigarkhanyan
- Gevork Vartanyan
- Jean Jansem
- Michel Legrand
- Michel Platini
- Evgeny Kisin
- Tonino Guerra
- Brian May
- Gerard Collomb
- Vladimir Solovyov
- Vladimir Movsissian
- Ara Darzi, Baron Darzi of Denham
