= Hilda Tchoboian =

French-Armenian community organizer

Hilda Tchoboian is a French-Armenian community organizer.

She was the chairwoman of the EAFJD (European Armenian Federation for Justice and Democracy), a grassroots organization based in Brussels, Belgium.

She has notably denounced human rights violations and mass desecration towards the Armenian minorities of Turkey, Georgia and Azerbaijan.
