= Jacques-Nicolas Paillot de Montabert =

French painter

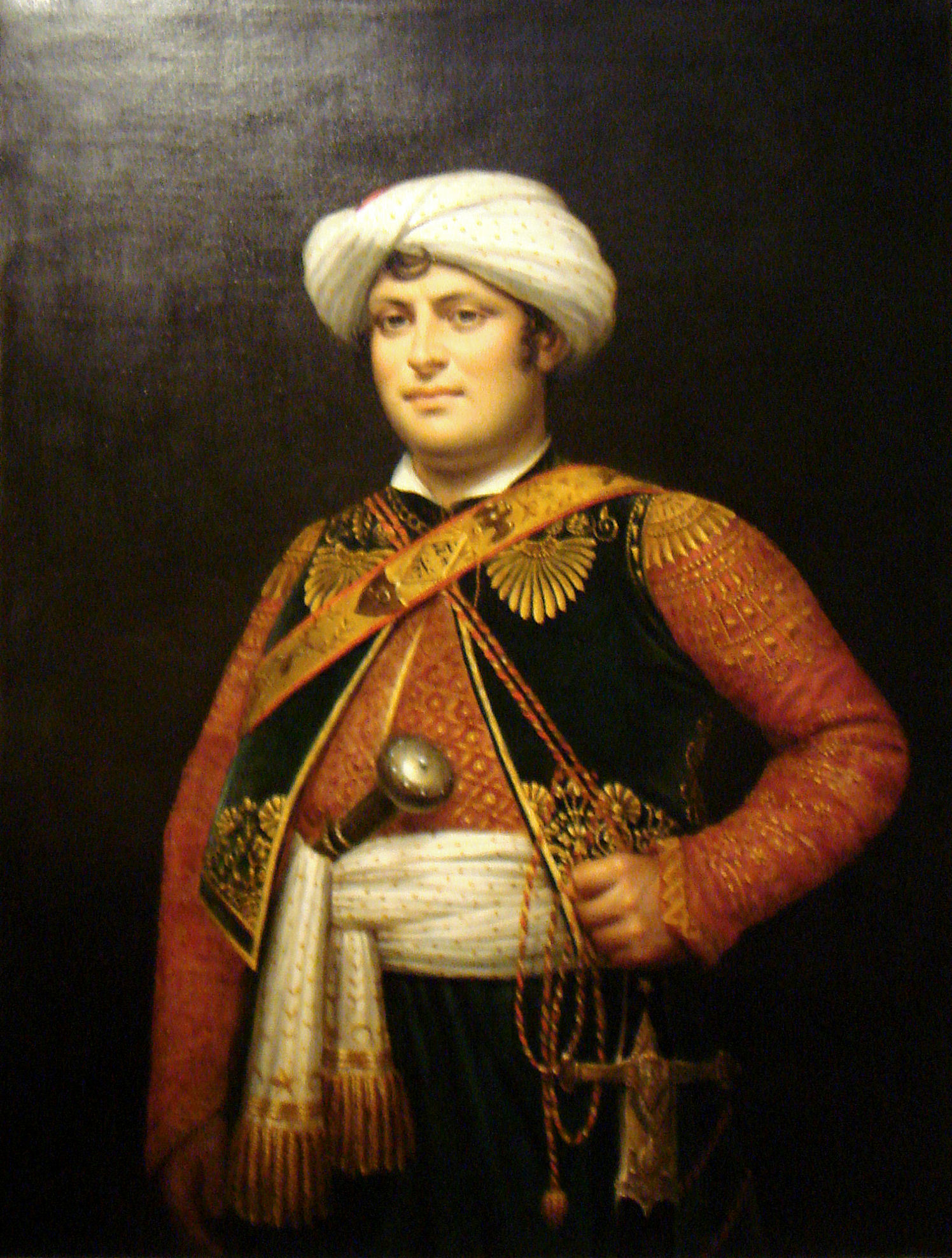
Le Mamelouk Roustam by Jacques-Nicolas Paillot de Montabert, 1806.

Jacques-Nicolas Paillot de Montabert (French: [ʒak nikɔla pajo də mɔ̃tabɛʁ]; 1771–1849) was a French painter of the early 19th century. He painted scenes related to the rule of Napoleon I.

He is famous for the painting of Napoleon's Mamluk bodyguard, Roustam, painted in 1806.
