= Roustam Raza =

Bodyguard of Napoleon

- Ռուստամ Ռազա
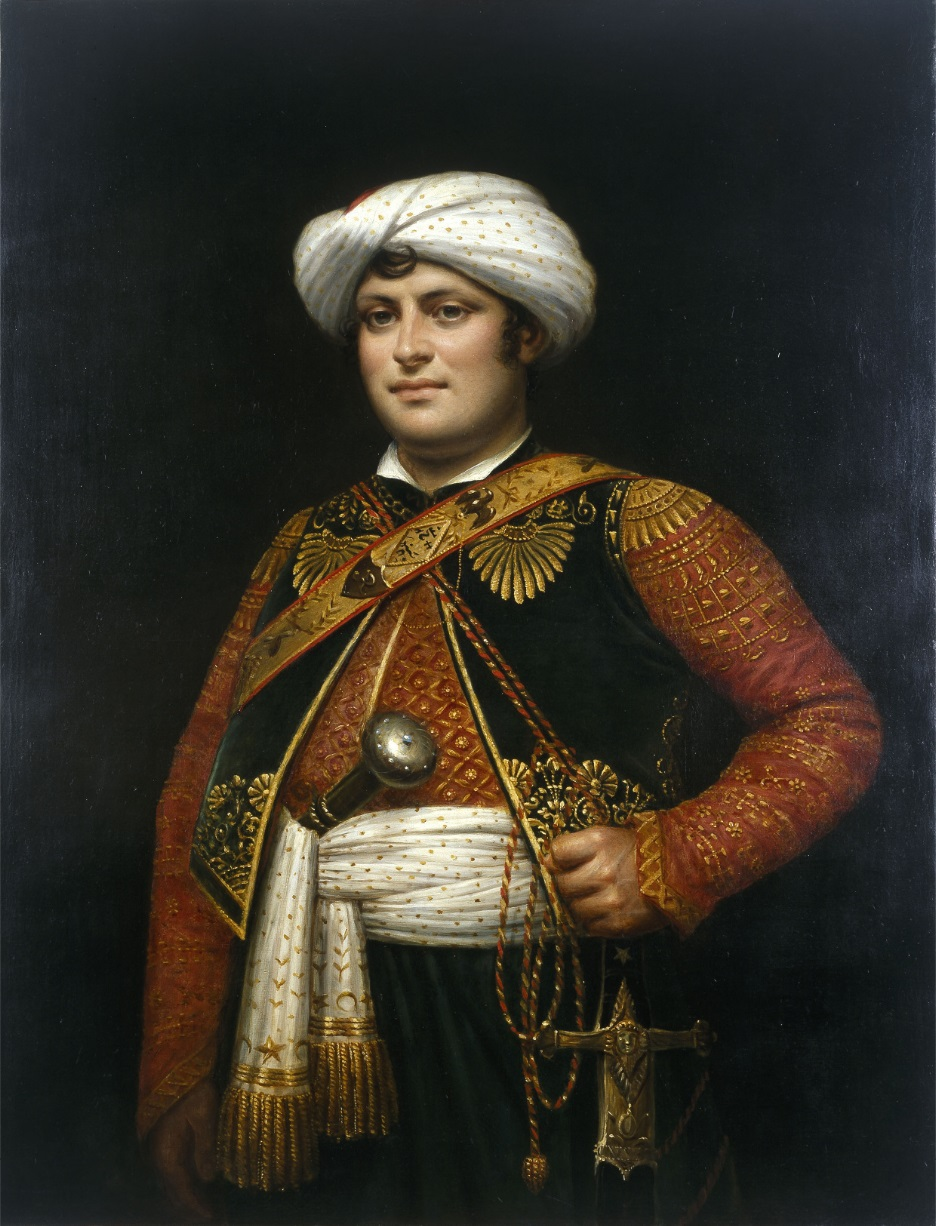
- Le Mamelouk Roustam Raza by Jacques-Nicolas Paillot de Montabert, 1806
- Born: Rostam; 1783; Tiflis, Kingdom of Kartli-Kakheti (present-day Tbilisi, Georgia)
- Died: December 7, 1845 (aged 61–62); Dourdan, France
- Citizenship: France
- Spouse: Alexandrine Douville
- Children: Achille

Roustam Raza (Armenian: Ռուստամ Ռազա; 1783 – 7 December 1845), also known as Roustan or Rustam, was a mamluk bodyguard and secondary valet of Napoleon.

== Early life ==
Roustam was born in Tiflis, Kingdom of Kartli-Kakheti (present-day Tbilisi, Georgia). He was of Armenian origin. According to his memoirs, his father Hovnan was a merchant from Aperkan in Armenia (probably Askeran, a town in Karabakh) and his mother Boudji Vari was an Armenian from Tiflis. At thirteen he was kidnapped and sold into slavery in Cairo. The Turks gave him the name "Idzhahia". The Sheikh of Cairo presented him to General Napoleon Bonaparte in 1798, during the French campaign in Egypt.

== In the service of Napoleon ==
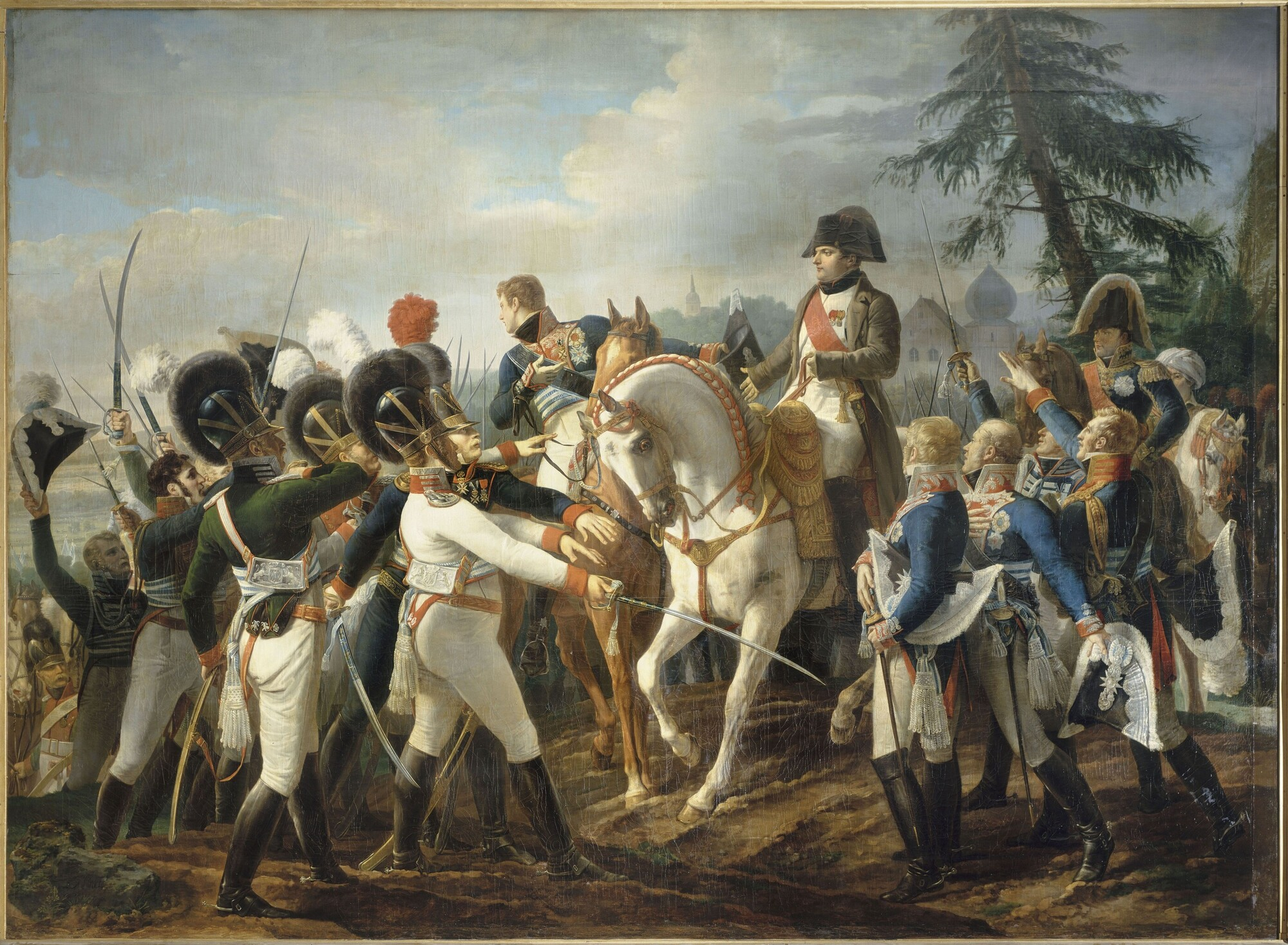
Painting of the Battle of Abensberg by Jean-Baptiste Debret, 1810. Roustam Raza (recognizable by his turban) is depicted in the background at the far right

Roustam served Napoleon for fifteen years, travelling with the First Consul and subsequent Emperor on all of his campaigns. The mamluk's role was that of a personal attendant, taking care of Napoleon's weapons and clothing, and supervising the serving of his meals. Acting as a bodyguard, he slept near to the Emperor. On ceremonial occasions, such as the coronation of 1804, Roustam would be in attendance dressed in full "oriental" costume.

== Later life ==
In 1814 Roustam married Mademoiselle Douville in Dourdan and refused to follow the Emperor in his exile to Elba after the first Bourbon Restoration. He offered his service to Napoleon during the Hundred Days, but the Emperor refused to even receive him and spoke bitterly of Raza's "betrayal" in his recollections written at St. Helena.

Raza later claimed that he feared Napoleon would commit suicide and that he would be blamed for his death. He cited this as the reason he left Napoleon during the marshals' revolt, just prior to the emperor's abdication. Raza's position as second valet was filled during the Hundred Days restoration by his former assistant and the Imperial Librarian, Louis-Étienne Saint-Denis, whom Napoleon took to calling Ali. Like Raza, Saint-Denis also wrote an autobiography about his time in Napoleon's Service.

On 7 December 1845, Roustam died in Dourdan. His memoirs of his service to Napoleon were first published in 1888.

== Gallery ==
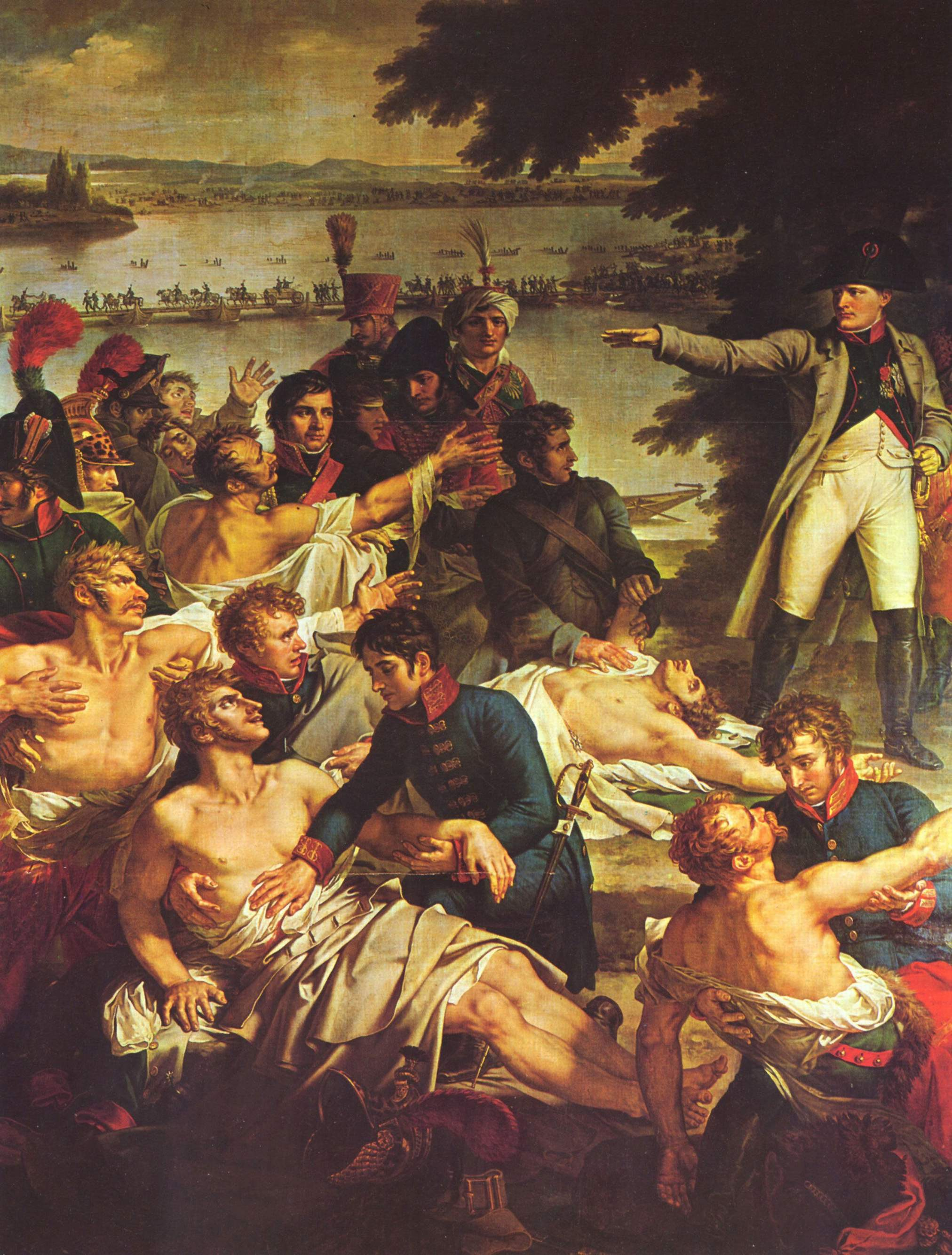
Napoleon's Return to the Island of Lobau After the Battle of Essling by Charles Meynier, 1812. Roustam Raza in the background.

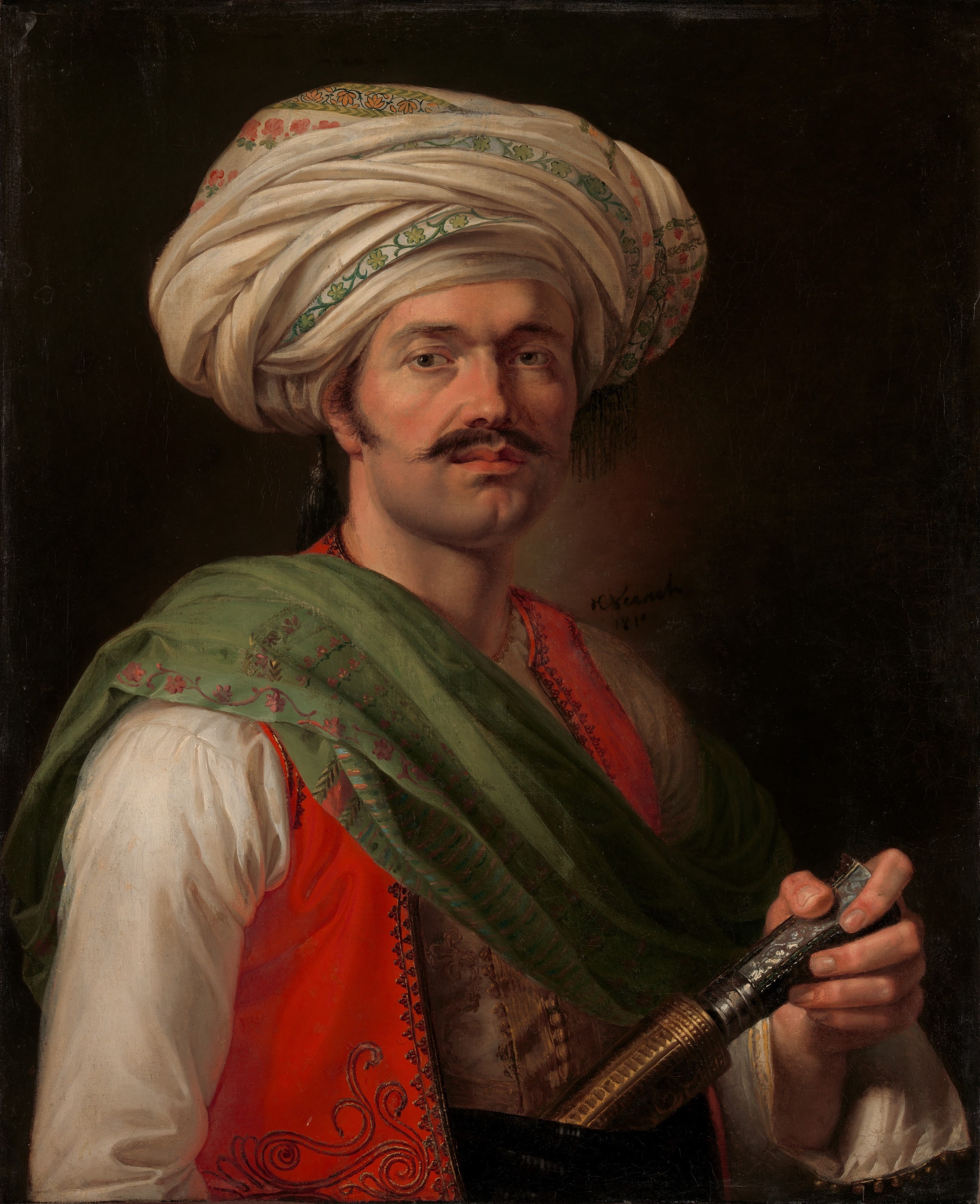
Portrait of Roustam Raza by Horace Vernet. 1810

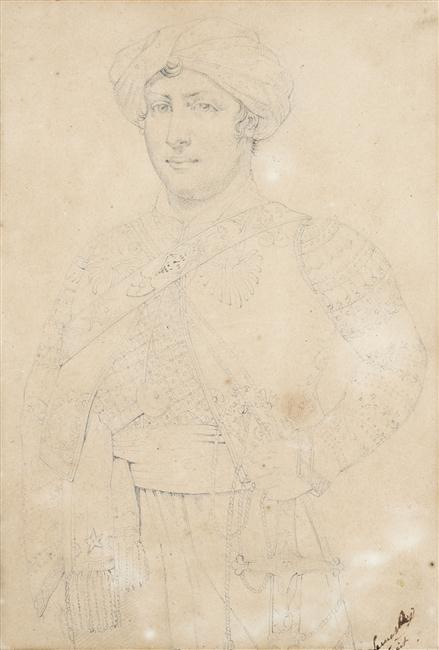
Portrait of Roustam Raza by Louis Nicolas Lemasle

== See also ==
- Mamelukes of the Imperial Guard

== Bibliography ==
- Fleischmann, Hector (1911). Roustam mameluck de Napoléon. Albert Méricant.
- Masson, Frédéric (1911). Souvenirs de Roustam, mamelouck de Napoléon I. Paul Ollendorff.
- Raza, Roustam; Ghazarians, Ara (2014). The Memoirs of Roustam: Napoleon's Mamluk Imperial Bodyguard. Translated by Carpenter, Catherine. Bennett & Bloom. ISBN 978-1908755223.
- Raza, Roustam; North, Jonathan (2017). Napoleon's Mameluke: The Memoirs of Roustam Raza. Enigma Books. ISBN 978-1936274727.
