= Anti-Fascist Underground Patriotic Organization =

Anti-fascist Underground Patriotic Organization (Russian: Антифашистская подпольная патриотическая организация, APPO) was an anti-fascist group of Soviet captives, formed during World War II in the fascist-occupied territories of USSR, Poland and France.

== History ==
The group was created in May, 1942, near Warsaw. It was ruled by the Central underground bureau of Armenian officiers S. Yaghjian (Yagdjyan), V. Vartanian, A. Kazarian, D. Minasyan, A. Karapetyan, B. Petrosyan and L. Titanyan. In October, 1942, some of captives were sent to Pulavy (Poland), where the Central Committee decided to enter and took the commanding positions in the formed Nazi battalions, and at the same time, to be in contact with Polish patriots. They made a plan of common uprising, which wasn't realised, as in October, 1943, the camp was sent to Mand, France. One battalion was sent to occupied rayon's of Maykop, another battalion was sent to Zhitomir, where it organized an anti-Nazi uprising (August, 1943). Then some of its organizers united with the local partisans.

The members of APPO also participated in the partisan movements of The Netherlands, Yugoslavia, Greece and Czechoslovakia.
