= Jean-Claude Kebabdjian =

Armenian-French editor and journalist

Jean-Claude Kebabdjian (born June 11, 1942 in Boulogne-Billancourt) is an Armenian-French publisher, journalist and author. Since the 1970s he raised awareness of Armenian memory and Armenian culture within the French society and within Europe.

== Activities ==
=== Armenian Diaspora Research Center ===
He is the president and founder of the Armenian Diaspora Research Center or Centre de Recherches sur la Diaspora Arménienne (ADRC - CRDA in French) created in 1976 in Paris. In the 1970s, France and other European countries had limited information about the extent of what had been lost by the Armenians in 1915. The Armenian genocide was subjected to censorship by the media and the public. People were not familiar with Armenian history, and the Armenian diaspora was not an understandable concept.

From 1976 to 2013, the CRDA has developed a vast amount of work and action in the field of Armenian culture, Armenian memory, Armenian genocide studies and promotion of the Armenian nation. It has worked closely with French Ministry of culture, French Ministry of Foreign Affairs and the municipality of Paris. The CRDA was also a founding member of the Forum des Instituts Culturels Étrangers à Paris (FICEP).

In 1977, Jean-Claude Kebabdjian founded the Astrid Editions, which published in 1980 the Armenian picture book "Arménie 1900", written by French historian Yves Ternon. "Arménie 1900" has been republished in 2009 by HC Editions under the title "L'Arménie d'antan".

Jean-Claude Kebabdjian was also the director of the review Ani, cahiers arméniens (5 issues – 1986, 1987, 1998, 1994), dedicated to armenology. The review was successful and received many contributions of prominent specialists, historians and intellectuals.

=== Groupement Interprofessionnel International Arménien ===
In 1981, Jean-Claude Kebabdjian co-founded the Groupement Interprofessionnel Arménien that later became Groupement Interprofessionnel International Arménien (G2IA).

=== Pioneer in the Armenian-Turkish dialogue ===
Jean-Claude Kebabdjian is the author of Turquie-Europe : le dialogue des intellectuels est-il possible?, in which he asks, as early as in 1986, if an Armenian-Turkish dialogue is necessary.

Nine years later, Armenia was an independent country, and a democratic movement was emerging in Turkey, with freedom fighters such as Taner Akçam or the Zarakolu teaching the history of the Armenian genocide and the Armenians to their society. In this new context, Jean-Claude Kebabdjian, with the help of Raffi Hermonn Araks, invited the Zarakolu to France and prepared meetings with the French Armenians.

He organised in Paris the first public conference with Turkish intellectuals on the Armenian subject : 1915-1998 : de la fracture au dialogue. As he was in 1999 the first Armenian from Diaspora to be invited by the civil society of Turkey for a cultural event, he asked before the media for the opening of the Armenian-Turkish dialogue. In June 2000, his center directed in the French Senate the first congress on the Armenian-Turkish dialogue. Some argue the March 2000 Chicago Armenian-Turkish meeting was the first one, yet not opened to the public, but it is proven that the June 2000 Paris Congress was the first public conference on the subject and one more step in a two decade-long serie of initiatives taken by Jean-Claude Kebabdjian.

In 2004, he proposed to a commission of the French Assembly to choose the Western Armenian city of Ani as a symbol of dialogue between Armenia and Turkey, 12 years after the call made by the CRDA for the safeguard of this medieval city, which gave birth to the French preservation mission of Ani led by Jean-Pierre Mahé, a French armenologist and academician.

In an interview to Arminfo, he argued that the Karabakh conflict resolution should be linked to the human, national and territorial consequences of the Armenian genocide. The western interests have boosted the nationalism and conservatism of the Turkish state during the Cold War. But with the recognition of the Armenian genocide by Turkey, the Azerbaijanese state and its western supporters would fail in their strategy of pressure upon the Armenians.

=== Armenian Diaspora Memory and Innovation and Ovenk ===
In 2002, he founded the Armenian Memory Institute, whose main objective is to collect, save and diffuse information on Armenian life before, during and after the Armenian genocide of 1915. The Armenian Memory Institute is the successor of the Armenian Diaspora Research Center and aims at pursuing the very first objective of the CRDA which is the promotion of Armenian culture, Armenian memory and Armenian diaspora.

In 2021, The Armenian Memory Institute became Armenian Diaspora Memory and Innovation (ADMIN), an independent structure currently based in Paris. It wants to establish in a dedicated place to pursue its initial vocation of better understanding of Armenian culture and Armenian history.

Since the late 1990s, Jean-Claude Kebabdjian wanted to provide Internet-based access to the CRDA Armenian archives. Starting in 2013, Armenian Diaspora Memory and Innovation (ADMIN) digitalized and integrated part of the CRDA Armenian archives, including numerous pictures on Armenian society before and after 1915.

In 2013, Armenian Diaspora Memory and Innovation (ADMIN) launched the photo site Ovenk, a family website dedicated to Armenian families and Armenian culture. Ovenk allows people to search for Armenian relatives, Armenian ancestors and places of origin.

== Selected writings ==
- Jean-Claude Kebabdjian, Yves Ternon, Arménie 1900, Éditions Astrid
- Jean-Claude Kebabdjian, Yves Ternon, L'Arménie d'antan, HC Éditions

== Movies ==
- Jacques Kebadian, Jean-Claude Kebabdjian, Mémoire Arménienne, 1983
