= 1947 in Iran =

- Decades: 1920s; 1930s; 1940s; 1950s; 1960s
- See also: Other events of 1947; Years in Iran

The following lists events that happened during 1947 in Pahlavi Iran.

== Incumbents ==
- Shah: Mohammad Reza Pahlavi
- Prime Minister: Ahmad Qavam (until December 29), Ebrahim Hakimi (starting December 29)

== Events ==
- 1947 Iranian legislative election.

== Births ==
- January 2 – Mahmoud Bahmani, Governor of the Central Bank of Iran from 2008 to 2013.
- January 5 – Aliakbar Aghaei Moghanjoei, Iranian politician.
- January 7 – Mohammad-Reza Lotfi, Iranian musician.
- January 9 – Iraj Janatie Ataie, Iranian poet.
- January 10 – Maryam Zandi, Iranian photographer.
- January 22 – Amir Ghavidel, Iranian screenwriter and film director.
- February 4 – Maryam Achak, Iranian fencer.
- February 8 – Reza Vatankhah, Iranian footballer and manager.
- February 10 – Ahmad Akbari, fencer.
- February 13 – Mohammad Reza Adelkhani, Iranian footballer.
- February 22 – Nasser Zarafshan, Iranian writer.
- February 23 – Gholam Vafakhah, Iranian footballer.
- February 23 – Goudarz Habibi, Iranian association football player.
- February 28 – Mansour Barzegar, Iranian wrestler.
- March 3 – Taha Behbahani, painter and Sculptor.
- March 6 – Mina Jafarzadeh, Iranian actress.
- March 8 – Tayfour Bathaii, Iranian revolutionary.
- March 13 – Yadollah Javadpour, Iranian flying ace.
- March 14 – Javad Yasari, Iranian singer of popular music.
- March 23 – Bahram Moshiri, Iranian writer and historian.
- March 23 – Mohammad Ali Inanloo, Iranian actor.
- March 26 – Homayoun Ershadi, Iranian actor.
- March 27 – Ahmad Tousi, Iranian footballer.
- April 2 – Ghasem Hajizadeh, Iranian modern painter.
- April 13 – Hossein Kazerani, Iranian footballer.
- May 23 – Mansoureh Khojasteh Bagherzadeh, wife of Ali Khamenei.
- May 24 – Hooshang Amirahmadi, Iranian American Academic/politician.
- May 25 – Abbas-Ali Soleimani, Iranian Shia cleric.
- May 26 – Hassan Shariatmadari, Iranian opposition politician and a leading proponent of the Free Elections Movement.
- June 6 – Ahmad Kashani, Iranian politician.
- June 9 – Mostafa Mir-Salim, Iranian politician.
- June 14 – Simin Safamehr, Iranian athlete.
- June 19 – Freydoon Shahidi, Iranian mathematician.
- June 21 – Shirin Ebadi, Iranian lawyer, human rights activist, and Nobel Peace Prize recipient.
- July 2 – Abolghasem Mozaffari, Head of Khatam Anbia Troops in Revolutionary Guard.
- July 11 – Mehdi Lavasani, footballer.
- July 14 – Abbas Bayat, Iranian businessman.
- July 17 – Rasool Vatandoust, Iranian archeologist.
- July 21 – Mohsen Farahvashi, Olympic wrestler.
- September 1 – Patrick Ali Pahlavi, Member of the former Iranian royal family.

== Deaths ==
- May 23 – Fereydun Ebrahimi, Prosecutor General of the National Government of Azerbaijan, victim of repression..
- June 11 – Ja'far Pishevari, Chairman of the Azerbaijan Democratic Party and the National Government of Azerbaijan..
- September 28 – Zhaleh Alamtaj Qaem-Maqami, 20th century feminist Iranian poet.
- ? – Ali Tabatabaei, Iranian scholar and mystic.
- ? – Fathollah Khan Akbar, Prime Minister of Iran.
- ? – Hassan Esfandiari, Iranian politician.
- ? – Malekeh Jahan, prince.
- ? – Rabiollah Kabiri, Major General, Minister of Roads, Post and Telegraph of the National Government of Azerbaijan..
