= Manook Khodabakhshian =

- مانوک خدابخشیان
- Born: 4 October 1945; Abadan, Iran
- Died: 6 September 2019 (aged 73); Los Angeles, California, United States
- Education: University of Isfahan (BA)
- Occupations: Football expert, sports commentator
- Notable work: Founder of Varzesh az Negah-e Do
- Television: National Iranian Radio and Television
- Children: 1

Manook Khodabakhshian (Armenian: Մանուկ Խոդաբախշեան; October 4, 1945 – September 6, 2019) was an Iranian-American football expert, sports commentator, and political analyst of Armenian descent. He was one of the most prominent sports media figures before the 1979 Iranian Revolution.

== Biography ==
Manook Khodabakhshian was born in Abadan on October 4, 1945. He graduated from Razi High School in Abadan and earned a bachelor's degree in Persian literature from the University of Isfahan. He was also the creator of the television program Varzesh az Negah-e Do (Sports from Channel 2's Perspective)

== Activities ==
Khodabakhshian was a capable, well-educated commentator deeply knowledgeable about contemporary football issues, establishing a brand-new approach to football commentary on television in the 1970s. Through up-to-date study, precise technical assessment, and accurate statistics, he played a significant role in raising public sports awareness.

Khodabakhshian quickly established himself as an undisputed sports commentator on television, leading authorities to entrust him with the most important matches. Through calculated analysis and detailed, otherwise inaccessible insights, he helped the public understand football on a deeper level. He has been called the "first man of Iranian football commentary," and his fans affectionately referred to him as "Uncle Manook."

=== The 1974 and 1978 World Cups ===
During that era, Habibollah Roushenzadeh and Khodabakhshian were responsible for live broadcasting and analyzing televised football matches, respectively. Roushenzadeh's live reporting was paired with Khodabakhshian's engaging and precise analysis. Khodabakhshian's technical vision was so sharp that during several World Cup matches, he correctly predicted vital substitutions minutes before world-class managers actually made them.

=== Varzesh az Negah-e Do TV Program ===
In 1974, when sports units were established for Channels 1 and 2 of National Iranian Radio and Television, sports management for Channel 1 was assigned to Habib Roushenzadeh, while Channel 2 was placed under Khodabakhshian.

During Iraj Gorgin's tenure as manager of Channel 2, Khodabakhshian collaborating with Hamid Ghazizadeh, Mohammad Ali Inanloo, Iraj Adibzadeh, and Reza Akhteh, brought the socio-sports program Varzesh az Negah-e Do to the airwaves of National Iranian Television. The program was so compelling and popular that it won the award for the most-viewed program two years in a row.

== Immigration to America ==
In July 1978, Khodabakhshian emigrated to the United States to pursue graduate studies in mass communications at the University of Minnesota and remained there following the outbreak of the revolution.

In the U.S., he became an outspoken opponent of the Islamic Republic regime and collaborated as a socio-political analyst with various media outlets, including Radio Sedaye Iran, Tasvir-e Iran TV, NITV, Tapesh TV, PEN TV, and Andisheh TV. Khodabakhshian hosted a program titled Shomarsh-e Ma'koos (Countdown), which aired on Saturdays at 2:45 PM Iran time on Channel One TV, managed by Shahram Homayoun. He also hosted a program on ePersianRadio.

In 2008, Khodabakhshian's interview with Iranian football figure Mohammad Mayeli Kohan sparked controversy in domestic media. In response to the reactions, Mayeli Kohan expressed no regret, stating that overseas commentators were more honest than many domestic media outlets.

== Illness and Death ==
After battling a heart attack and a stroke, Khodabakhshian passed away at the age of 73 on Friday, September 6, 2019, at 11:35 AM in Los Angeles.

== Prediction of the 2022 Protests ==
One of his predictions widely circulated on social media states:

"One day, mothers and daughters, or the 'Cinderellas,' will flood the streets, take the regime apart, and become its Achilles' heel."

He often spoke of a "stylish Pasargadian generation" that would lay the groundwork for an Iranian Renaissance, reiterating that with this demographic, "the overthrow of the regime has been triggered."
