= Saltmen =

Human remains discovered in the Chehrabad salt mines

The Saltmen (Persian: مردان نمکی, romanized: mardān-e namakī) are the preserved remains of multiple human individuals that were discovered in the Chehrabad salt mines, located on the southern part of the Hamzehlu village, on the west side of the city of Zanjan, in Zanjan Province, Iran. By 2010, the remains of six men had been discovered, most of them accidentally killed by the collapse of galleries in which they were working. The head and left foot of Saltman 1 are on display at the National Museum of Iran in Tehran.

The remains date back to Achaemenid (550–330 BCE), Parthian (247 BCE–224 CE), and Sasanian (224–651 CE) periods.

== Identity and dating ==
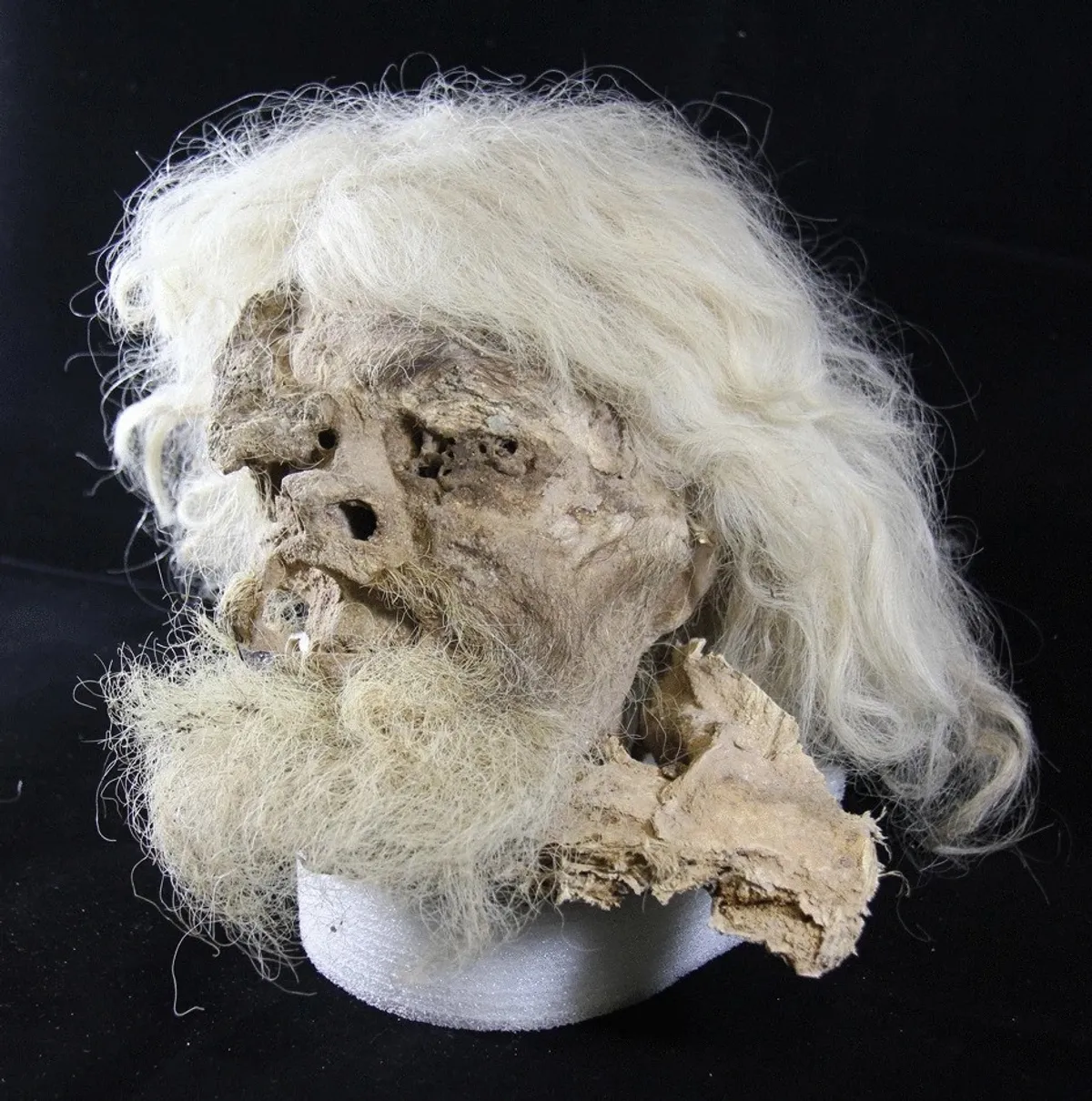
Head of Saltman 1 on display at National Museum of Iran in Tehran

The six individuals known collectively as the Saltmen lived over a span of nearly a thousand years and did not belong to a single community or generation. Radiocarbon dating indicates that they date to the Achaemenid (550–330 BCE), Parthian (247 BCE–224 CE), and Sasanian (224–651 CE) periods, indicating that the Chehrabad salt mine remained in use over many centuries rather than during a single phase of mining activity.

Despite their collective name, the recovered individuals do not all appear to have been adult men. They include at least one adolescent, estimated to have been between 15 and 16 years old at the time of death, and one individual identified as female. Most are thought to have died in separate mining accidents caused by the collapse of underground galleries during different periods of the mine's operation.

Discovered in 1993, Saltman 1 is the best-preserved individual and has been the subject of the most detailed scientific study. Radiological and histological examination has shown that his facial soft tissues, hair, and beard survived in exceptional condition. He was an adult approximately 35 to 40 years old and about 175 centimetres (5 ft 9 in) tall at the time of his death. His left ear remained pierced and still contained a gold earring. His clothing and personal possessions also survived, providing an unusually detailed picture of an individual who lived during the late Sasanian period.

Radiological examination identified extensive fractures of the skull and face consistent with fatal injuries sustained during the collapse of the mine. As additional remains have been discovered and dated, researchers have concluded that the Saltmen represent multiple individuals who died in separate incidents over several centuries rather than victims of a single mining disaster.

== Discovery ==
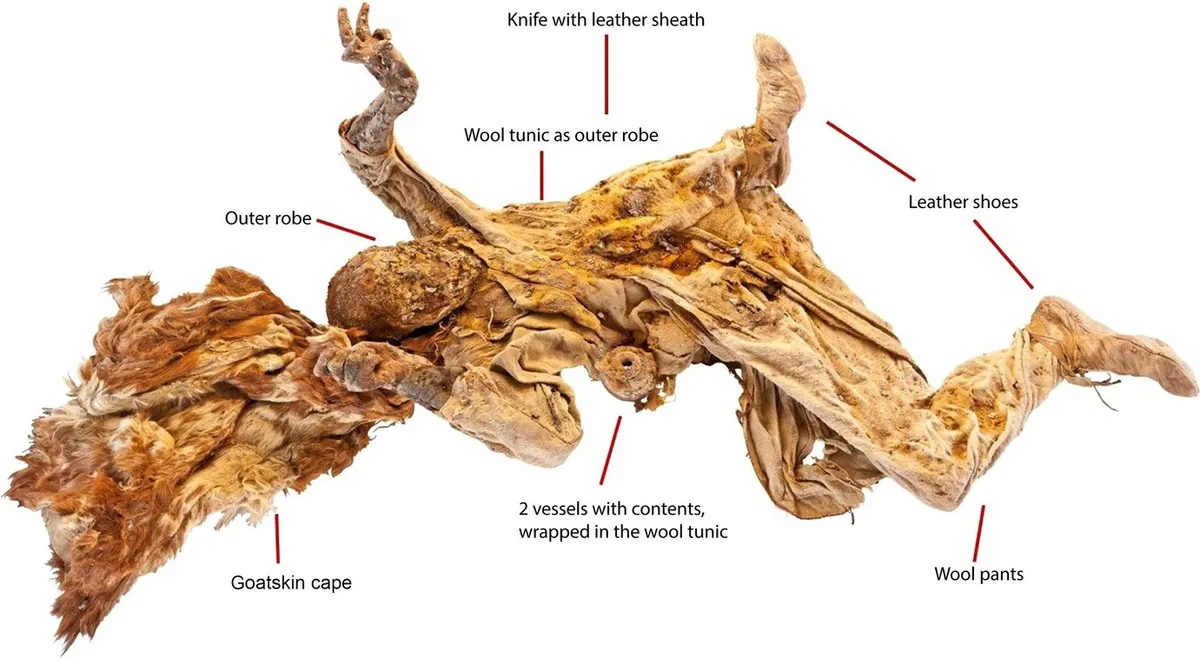
Remains of Saltman 4, a young man aged 15 or 16

The Saltmen were discovered in the Chehrabad salt mine near the village of Hamzehlu, west of Zanjan in Zanjan Province, northwestern Iran. Archaeological evidence indicates that the mine was worked during the Achaemenid, Parthian, and Sasanian periods, and it remained an active commercial salt mine when the first remains were discovered accidentally during routine mining operations in the winter of 1993.

While excavating a tunnel, miners accidentally uncovered the severed head of what later became known as Saltman 1, together with his left lower leg preserved inside a leather boot. Clothing, tools, and other personal possessions were also recovered. The unexpected discovery prompted archaeological investigation of the mine.

Additional discoveries followed over the next two decades as commercial mining continued and archaeological excavations expanded. A second individual was discovered by miners in 2004, while archaeological excavations in 2005 uncovered the remains of two more individuals. Further excavation campaigns resulted in the discovery of additional remains, including a sixth individual in 2010.

In 2006, the Iranian Cultural Heritage, Handicrafts and Tourism Organization began a long-term international research project with the German Mining Museum in Bochum, Germany. Researchers from the University of Oxford and the University of Zurich joined the project the following year. Supported by the Deutsche Forschungsgemeinschaft and British funding, the collaboration investigated the archaeology and chronology of the mine and the preservation of the human remains.

To protect the archaeological site, the mining permit for Chehrabad was cancelled in 2008. Four of the recovered individuals were transferred to the Archaeology Museum (Zolfaghari House) in Zanjan, while the head and left foot of Saltman 1 were placed on display at the National Museum of Iran in Tehran. The sixth individual, discovered during excavations in 2010, was left in situ within the mine.

== Associated objects and materials ==
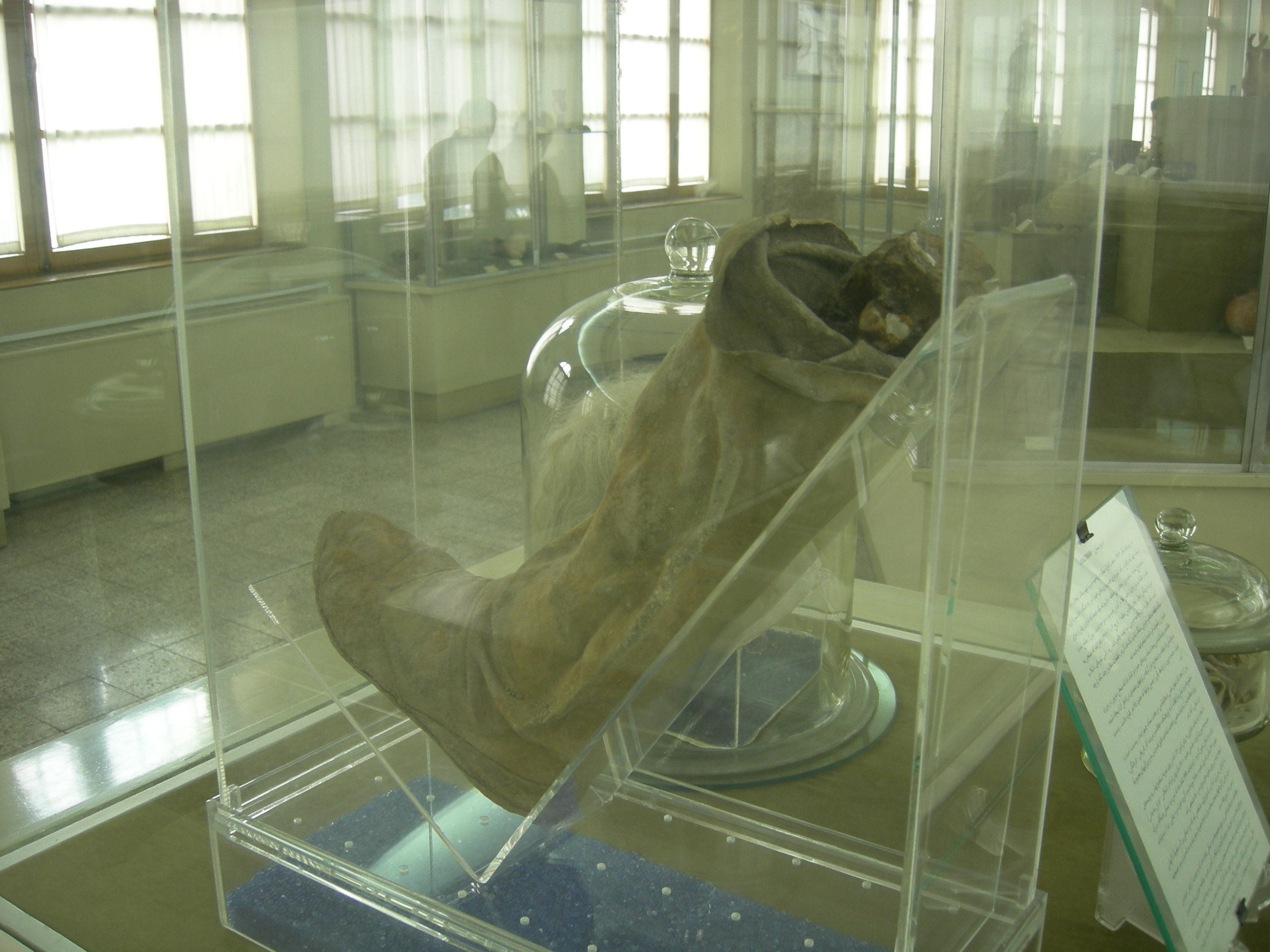
Left shoe with lower leg of Saltman 1

These included the remains of a body, a lower leg inside a leather boot, three iron knives, a woollen half trouser, a silver needle, a sling, parts of a leather rope, a grindstone, a walnut, some pottery sherds, some patterned textile fragments, and a few broken bones.

Three hundred pieces of fabric were found, some of which retained designs and dyes. In 2008, the Ministry of Industries and Mines canceled the mining permit.

The clothing of the Achaemenid men reveals a coherent and highly functional system of dress. Garments were made of dense woolen textiles, arranged in multiple layers to provide insulation and durability. Trousers and long-sleeved tunics allowed for mobility and protection. Leather boots with complex construction techniques supported working on uneven and cold environments. Decorative elements, such as embroidery and colored threads, were applied selectively along seams and structural points.

== Preservation ==
The remains were preserved by the environment of the Chehrabad salt mine, where high concentrations of salt inhibited the growth of bacteria and other microorganisms responsible for decomposition. The dry, saline conditions rapidly desiccated soft tissues, allowing skin, hair, beards, clothing, and other organic materials to survive from the Achaemenid, Parthian, and Sasanian periods.

Unlike most archaeological sites, where organic materials rapidly decompose, the highly saline conditions at Chehrabad preserved a wide range of perishable materials alongside the human remains. These included leather, wool, wood, rope, food remains, and textiles. Preservation varied between the individuals depending on the conditions in which they came to rest following mining collapses at different periods of the mine's use. Some bodies remained largely intact, while others were fragmented by falling rock.

The exceptional preservation has enabled radiocarbon dating, computed tomography, stable isotope analysis, parasitological study, and detailed examination of textiles, leather, and other organic materials.

== Research ==
In a 2012 research paper, it was reported that the 2200-year-old mummy of Chehrabad had tapeworm eggs from the genus Taenia in his intestine. This brings new information on ancient diet, indicating the consumption of raw or undercooked meat, and it also constitutes the earliest evidence of ancient intestinal parasites in Iran, adding to the knowledge of gastrointestinal pathogens in West Asia.

== See also ==
- Mummy
- Ötzi the Iceman

== Sources ==
- Aali, Abolfazl; Stöllner, Thomas; Abar, Aydin; Rühli, Frank (2012). "The Salt Men of Iran: The Salt Mine of Douzlākh, Chehrābād". Archäologisches Korrespondenzblatt. 42 (1). Mainz: Verlag des Römisch-Germanischen Zentralmuseums: 61–81. ISSN 0342-734X.
- Hadian; Good; Pollard (2013). "Textiles from Douzlakh Salt Mine at Chehr Abad, Iran: A Technical and Contextual Study of Late pre-Islamic Iranian Textiles". The International Journal of Humanities of the Islamic Republic of Iran. 19 (3). Tarbiat Modarres University: 152–173. ISSN 1735-5060. Archived from the original on 19 July 2013.
- National Museum of Iran, Description of the exhibits. Tehran.
- Ramaroli, V; Hamilton, J.; Ditchfield, P.; Fazeii, H.; Aali, A.; Coningham, R.A.E.; Pollard, A.M. (2010). "The Chehr Abad "Salt men" and the isotopic ecology of humans in ancient Iran". American Journal of Physical Anthropology. 143 (3): 343–354. Bibcode:2010AJPA..143..343R. doi:10.1002/ajpa.21314. PMID 20949607.
- Vatandoust, Abdolrasool (1998). Saltman: Scientific Investigations carried out on Saltman Mummified Remains and its Artifacts (1st ed.). Tehran: Research Center for Conservation of Cultural Relics (RCCCR). ISBN 964-91875-1-0.
