= Tayfour Bathaii =

Iranian revolutionary

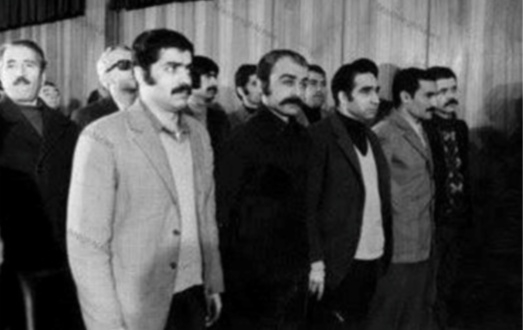
the second court.from the left:Tayfour Bathaii, Khosro Golsorkhi, Manuchehr Salimi, Keramat Daneshyan, Abas Samakar

Tayfour Bathaii (born March 8, 1947), writer, film director, activist, was born in Sanandaj, Iran. After finishing high school in Sanandaj, he started his 2-year mandatory military services as a teacher. From 1969 to 1972, he attended the Tehran School of Television and Cinema to become a TV cameraman. In the 70's, due to his leftist tendencies and alleged affiliation with the "Group of 12" accused of plotting to kidnap Farah Pahlavi, the Queen of Iran, and the crown prince, he was tried and sentenced to life in prison. During the revolution of 1979 in Iran, along with other political prisoners, he was released and returned to Sanandaj, a province of Kurdistan, Iran. He joined the Democratic Party of Kurdistan and was a member of this party until 1985. He has continued his life in Sweden since then as a political activist, writer, sculptor, and film director. He also teaches cinema and documentary cinematography.

== Early life ==
Tayfour was the 5th child of 8, born in the Jorabad neighborhood of Sanandaj, Iran. The son of a school teacher and a home maker, he attended 15 Bahman Elementary School and Avicenna and Shahpour High Schools. After finishing high school, he served in the military as a Teacher (Sepah Danesh) in Turkmen Sahra for two years. This is followed by passing the entrance exam into Tehran School of Television and Cinema in 1969. He then went on to work for Shiraz TV where he met Keramat Daneshian, another student of Tehran School of Cinema, who introduced Tayfour to armed struggle customary of the 1960s and 1970s.

== The Struggle ==
=== Plotting to take hostages, trial, and prison ===
A group spearheaded by Samakar and Allamehzadeh, suggested the plot of taking the Queen of Iran and her son hostage in exchange for political prisoners. While contemplating the idea and making preparations, Tayfour and his friend, Keramat, were given up to the authorities by Amir Hossein Fetanat who was in contact with Keramat. The group (except for Fetanat) was arrested in 1973. During interrogations, another group who was plotting to attack the King of Iran, were discovered and the two groups were put on trial together without having any relationships with each other. The accused, known as the group of 12, were: Tayfour Bathaii, Khosrow Golsorkhi, Monouchehr Moghadam Salimi, Keramat Daneshian, Abbas Samakar, Reza Alamehzadeh, Iraj Jamshidi, Shokooh Mirzadegi, Mortezah Siahpoosh, Maryam Etehadieh, Ibrahim Farhang, and Farhad Ghaysari. In the first trial, Tayfour along with Keramat Daneshian, Abbas Samakar, Reza Alamehzadeh, and Khosrow Golsorkhi were sentenced to be executed while the rest of the group received lesser sentences. The same sentences were handed down in the second trial but after the final trial only Keramat Daneshian and Khosrow Golsorkhi were executed due to their ideological arguments and the others' death sentences were reduced to life in prison.

== Return to Kurdistan and then exile ==
After 5 years of captivity, Tayfour along with other political prisoners were released from prison a few months before the 1979 revolution in Iran. He returned to his hometown of Sanandaj where he joined the Democratic Party of Kurdistan of Iran (PDKI). In the winter of 1982, during the 5th congress, he was elected to the central committee of PDKI where he became the head of the Youth Organization in the party. During his time with the party, he made a four-part documentary movie that depicted the life and struggles of the Kurds. "Naan va Azadi" (bread and freedom), was the most famous film which was featured, along with his other films, in the Exile Film Festival. Tayfour resigned from the party in 1985 following the conflict escalation between PDKI and Komala (another Kurdish party) that resulted in clashes between the two parties. Currently, he lives in Sweden where he spends most of his time writing.

== His work ==
=== Film ===
1. Suffering - 1979
2. Bread and Freedom - 1983
3. Migration (nomads) - 1983
4. Proud mountain peaks - 1983
5. Light of candles - 1983
6. Pack of wolves (Long movie) - 1990
7. Debliachah, Documentary about Gypsies
8. Dark conspiracy - 2006

=== Books in Persian ===
1. Life in the Wind (Novel)
2. Four stories (Novel)
3. Haves and have nots of the world (Translation)
4. Mr. Chokh Bakhtiar
5. Dreamy Journey - From Kursan to Kurdistan (Autobiography)
6. Life like itself (Novel)

=== Books in Kurdish ===
1. Life like itself (Novel)
2. Dreamy Journey - From Kursan to Kurdistan (Autobiography)
3. Galavizh (Screen play)
4. Women rights in Kurdish society (Research based book, Coauthor Jila Faraji)
5. Life in the Wind (Novel)
