= 1889 in Iran =

- Decades
- See also: Other events of 1889; Years in Iran

The following lists events that happened during 1889 in Qajar era.

== Incumbents ==
- Monarch: Naser al-Din Shah Qajar

== Births ==
- ? – Ahmad Bahar, Iranian politician.
- ? – Avetis Sultan-Zade, Persian-born ethnic Armenian communist and economist.
- ? – Firouz Nosrat-ed-Dowleh III, Qajar prince and Iranian politician.
- ? – Hossein Lankarani, Iranian Shia cleric and politician.
- ? – Hossein Taherzadeh Behzad, Iranian painter.
- ? – Khadijeh Afzal Vaziri, Iranian journalist, women's rights activist.
- ? – Rabiollah Kabiri, Major General, Minister of Roads, Post and Telegraph of the National Government of Azerbaijan..
