= Zhaleh Kazemi =

Iranian voice actress

- ژاله کاظمی
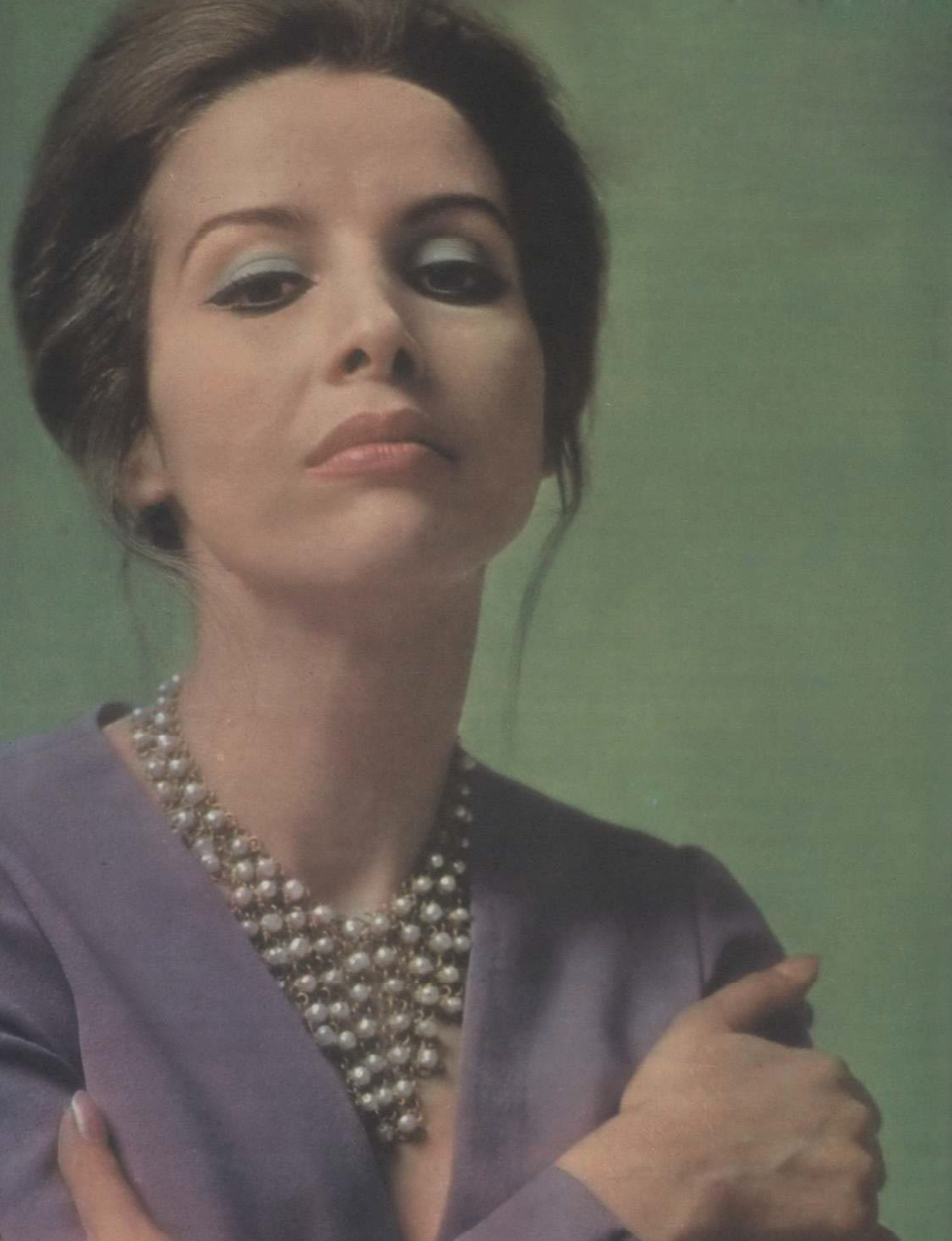
- 1971 portrait
- Born: Zahra Kazemi-Azad زهرا کاظمی‌آزاد; 3 April 1943; Tehran, Iran
- Died: 31 March 2004 (aged 60); Virginia, U.S.
- Other names: Jaleh Kazemi
- Occupations: TV producer, news anchor, painter
- Spouse(s): Siamak Yasemi (div.); Iraj Gorgin (m. ?–1966); Bijan Elahi (m. 1988–2000)
- Children: 1

Zhaleh Kazemi (Persian: ژاله کاظمی; née Zahra Kazemi-Azad; 3 April 1943 – 31 March 2004) was an Iranian television producer, news anchor, and painter. She was also a voice actress for Persian-dubbed films in Iranian cinema.

== Career ==
Her dubbing work was done for many American films, and Kazemi was the regular voice actor for films starring Sophia Loren, Elizabeth Taylor, and Ingrid Bergman. Other actresses she dubbed for included Vivien Leigh, Eva Gardner, Jennifer Jones, Joanne Woodward, Leslie Caron, Shirley MacLaine, Vanessa Redgrave, Ali MacGraw, Julie Christie, Faye Dunaway, Barbra Streisand, and Mia Farrow. After the Iranian Revolution in 1979, the film dubbing industry in Iran stopped.

== See also ==
- Iranian art
- List of Iranian artists
