= Chehrehabad =

Village in Zanjan province, Iran

Chehrehabad Persian: چهره اباد
- Village
- Location within Iran
- Coordinates: 36°52′39″N 47°52′18″E
- Country: Iran
- Province: Zanjan
- County: Zanjan
- District: Zanjanrud
- Rural District: Ghanibeyglu

Population (2016)
  - Total: 262
- Time zone: UTC+3:30 (IRST)

Chehrehabad (Persian: چهره اباد) (Note: Also romanized as Chehrehābād; also known as Chehrābād) is a village in Ghanibeyglu Rural District of Zanjanrud District in Zanjan County, Zanjan province, Iran.

== Demographics ==
=== Population ===
At the time of the 2006 National Census, the village's population was 378 in 107 households. The following census in 2011 counted 306 people in 99 households. The 2016 census measured the population of the village as 262 people in 95 households.
