= Goudarz Habibi =

Iranian footballer (born 1947)

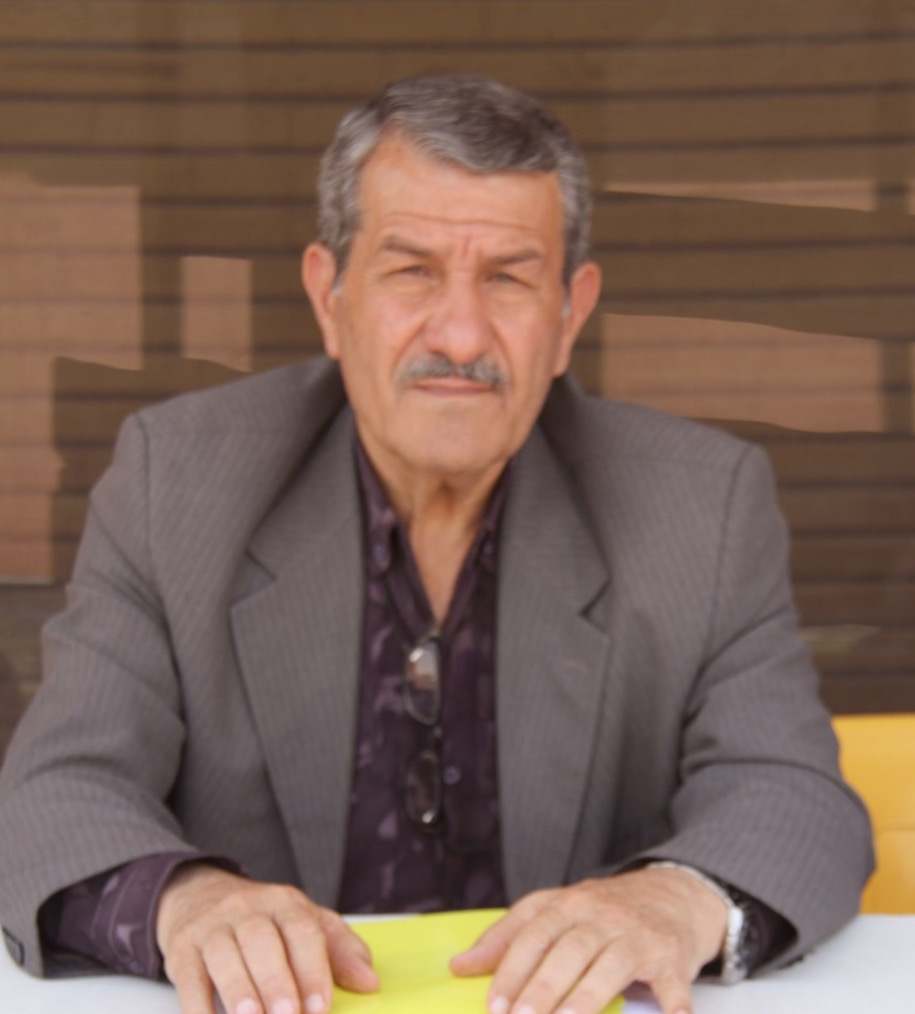
- 2018

Personal information
- Place of birth: Iran
- Position: Defender

Senior career*
Years	Team	Apps	(Gls)
1967	Shoa FC		
1969	Paykan		
1970–1973	Taj SC		

International career
1966	Iran	5	(0)
- * Club domestic league appearances and goals

Goudarz Habibi (Persian: گودرز حبیبی, born 23 February 1947) is an Iranian former footballer who played as a defender for Iran national football team at the 1972 Summer Olympics and 1970 RCD Cup.

At the club level he played for Taj Tehran.
