= Bahram Moshiri =

Iranian-American historian and television presenter (1947–2025)

Bahram Moshiri (22 March 1947 – 10 November 2025) was an Iranian-American historian and television presenter.

== Life and career ==
Moshiri was born in Golpayegan on 22 March 1947. After graduating from college, he joined the police service before moving to the United States in 1974. He received a master's degree in materials science and chemical engineering from The Catholic University of America.

In 2002, he started hosting the Persian-language program Land of Eternity on Pars TV, where he discussed history, current affairs, and politics. He was notably outspoken against religious rule and despotism and the historical decline of Iran.

In 2011, Moshiri announced in a television interview that Ministry of Intelligence forces had attempted to assassinate him, and that he was under the protection of the FBI and other agencies under the command of the US government.

Moshiri died in Irvine, California on 10 November 2025, at the age of 78.
