= Taha Behbahani =

Iranian painter and sculptor

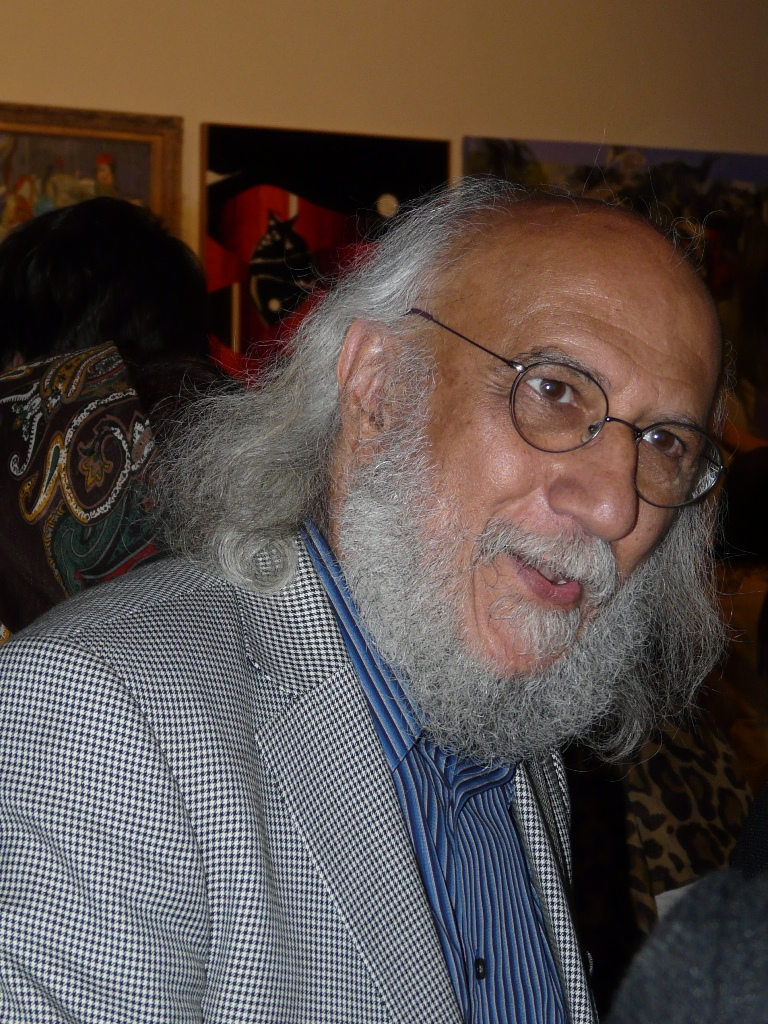
- Taha Behbahani
- Born: Taha Behbahani; March 3, 1947 (age 79); Tehran, Iran
- Known for: Painting, sculptor, Set Designer, TV and Theater Director
- Notable work: Bird and Lock, The Birds of Taha

Taha Behbahani (Persian: طاها بهبهانی) is a famous Iranian painter, sculptor, set designer, TV and theatre director and a university professor was born in 1947 in Tehran, Iran.

== Education ==
As a child he was taught how to paint by his father and later became a distinguished Student of master Ali Akbar Najmabadi (one of kamal-ol-Molk's students) at the age of thirteen.

He went through his high school education and Kamal-ol-Molk Art school simultaneously and then entered the Dramatic Art faculty and graduated in set design for theater, television and cinema.

Later in Paris and Salzburg he started to study and research in the field of Marionette Theater and its connections to the painting and sculpture of the east.

== Career ==
=== Paintings ===
Taha was one of the artists who created a new atmosphere in the painting in 1960's. By presenting his works; he propounded the Metaphysical Surrealistic School in painting.

=== Sculptures ===
- I have been all locked, till you reach the sun, Dimensions: 31.5x59x9cm, Bronze
- At the liberty summit, I will touch the ground of your threshold, Dimensions: 9x40x47cm, Bronze
- The lovers never have a shade but the tree of life, Dimensions: 96.5x33x8cm, Bronze
- My eyes would not see but “Hoo”, I could ‘not utter a word but “hagh”, Dimensions: 11.5x65.5x85cm, Bronze
- I will sing all night long, till the night drapes fall, Dimensions: 11x27.5x106cm, Bronze
- Unlock the lock, so as unlock you, Dimensions: 10x31x33.5 cm, Bronze
- Unlock the lock to attain a hundred springs, Dimensions: 9x20x60cm, Bronze
- Our love survives from the roots up to branches, Dimensions: 8x33x96.5 cm, Bronze
- Indemnity of wisdom is a hundred locks on each chain, Dimensions: 9.5x24x48cm, Bronze
- Let us colorize the love in each chain of the lock this night, Dimensions: 11x11.5x62.5 cm, Bronze
- In my praise I will transform the sting in my mind, into enjoyment, Dimensions: 43x43x15cm, Bronze
- If you are a love enthusiast, just desert “me” and “us”, Dimensions: 82.5x45.5x11cm, Bronze

=== Medallions ===
The medallions of Taha are made by Gold and Silver.

== Exhibitions ==
He has participated in 40 different exhibitions as a solo artist or as a member of a group of artists in Iran and abroad.

=== Solo exhibitions ===
- February 1969, The Collection Exhibition, Iran Bastan Museum, Tehran, Iran
- November 1969, The Collection Exhibition, Iran Bastan Museum
- December 1970, The Exclusive Exhibition, Khaneye Aftab Gallery, Tehran, Iran
- November 1971, The Contemporary Arts of Iran, Iran Novin Museum, Tehran, Iran
- December 1971, The Exclusive Exhibition in Private Office, Tehran, Ira
- February 1972, The First Exhibition of Contemporary Iranian Painters and sculptors, Sullivan Gallery
- March 1972, The second Exhibition of Contemporary Iranian Painters and sculptors, Sullivan Gallery
- May 1972, The Exhibition of Contemporary Painters and sculptors, Tehran Gallery, Tehran, Iran
- September 1973, The Exhibition of Contemporary Iranian Painters and sculptors, The Visual Arts Center
- November 1973, The Exclusive Exhibition, Tehran Gallery, Tehran, Iran
- January 1974, The Collective Exhibition, Tehran Gallery, Tehran, Iran
- June 1974, The Collective Exhibition, Sayhoon Gallery, Tehran, Iran
- October 1974, The Collective Exhibition in Sayhoon Gallery, Tehran, Iran
- October 1974, The Collective Exhibition in Mirabel
- December 1974, The Collective Exhibition in the First International Exhibition
- May 1980, The Exclusive Exhibition in French Foundations, France
- 1983, The Speech Invitation for the Central Twentieth Century About the Islamic arts – Especially The paintings after The Islam
- November 1986, The Collective Exhibition in Negresco Art Gallery, Nice, France
- November 1989, The Exclusive Exhibition in Mehr Gallery, Tehran, Iran
- May 1991, The Exclusive Exhibition in Maillez Gallery, Paris, France
- September 1992, The Exclusive Exhibition in Maillez Gallery, Paris, France
- November 1995, The Exclusive Exhibition in Niavaran Palace Museum, Tehran, Iran
- 1997, The Exhibition in Satricon, Poland
- March 1999, The Collective Exhibition "The Dream Of Angle" in the Tehran Museum Of Contemporary Art, Iran
- June 2002, The Third Tehran sculpture Biennial, Cultural Center Of Niavaran, Tehran, Iran
- November 2003, A Spiritual Vision", The Tehran Museum Of Contemporary Art, Iran
- September 2004, The Exclusive Exhibition, Niavaran Artistic Creations Foundation, Tehran, Iran
- December 2004, The 6th Tehran contemporary Painting Biennial, The Tehran Museum Of Contemporary Art, Iran
- July 2005, The Spiritual Art Exhibition, The Tehran Museum Of Contemporary Art, Iran
- December 2005, The Modern Art Movement, The Tehran Museum Of Contemporary Art, Iran
- August 2006, The East of Imagination, The Tehran Museum Of Contemporary Art, Iran
- June 2007, The second Fine art exhibition in support of children with Cancer, Niavaran artistic Creations Foundation, Tehran, Iran
- June 2007, The second Fine art exhibition in support of children with Cancer, the Organizer, Tehran, Iran
- September 2007, The collective exhibition in commemorate of 800th Birthday of Mowlana Rumi in Unesco, Paris, France
- September 2007, The collective exhibition Manifestations of contemporary art in Iran- The Tehran Museum Of Contemporary Art, Iran
- October 2007, The Collective Exhibition, Nar Gallery, Tehran, Iran
- November 2008, Solo Exhibition, Shirin Art Gallery, Tehran, Iran
- April 2009, Magic Of Persia, Dubai, UAE
- May 2010, Solo Sculptures Exhibition, Shirin Art Gallery, Tehran, Iran

=== Group exhibitions ===
- April 2001, The Collective Exhibition "The Breeze From The Garden of Persia-The Meridian International center, Washington Dc, USA
- September 2002, The Collective Exhibition in The Queen Library, New York City
- September 2003, The Collective Exhibition in Art center Of Plano Texas, USA
- October 2009, 100 Artworks and 100 Artists, Art Center
- September 2010, 4th Beijing International Art Biennial, Beijing, China

== Books and articles ==
He has published a Book and various Articles.

=== Book ===
- "The Birds of Taha", 2006

== Professional membership ==
He has been a member of the executive board of Iran's National Creative Arts Committee, affiliated with UNESCO and a jury member in a number of international exhibitions.
