= Iraj Gorgin =

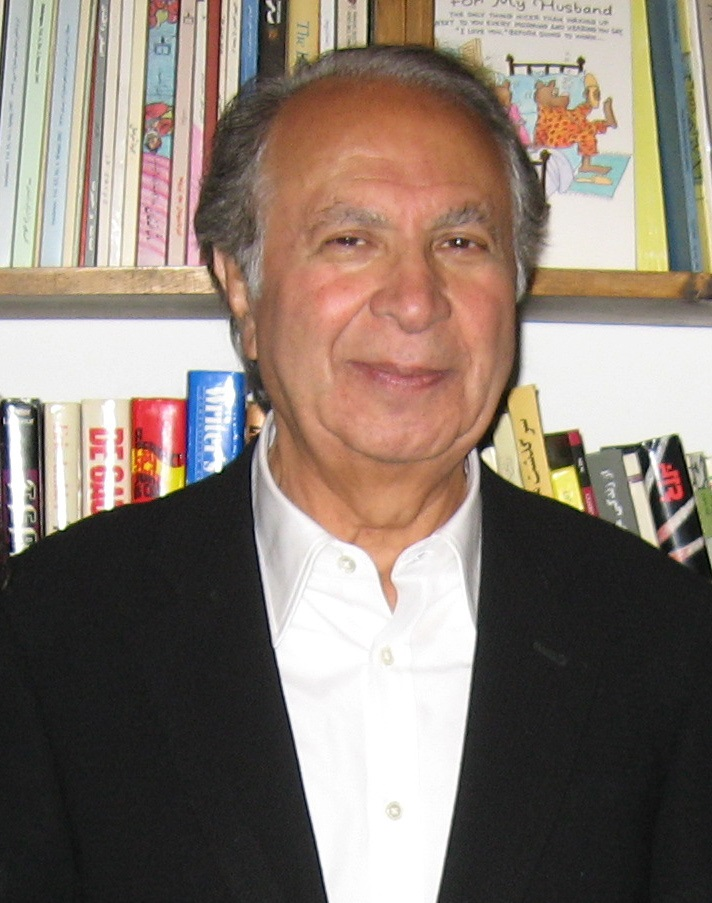
- Born: February 14, 1934; Isfahan, Iran
- Died: January 13, 2012 (aged 77); Fairfax, Virginia, U.S.
- Education: University of Tehran
- Occupations: Radio and television journalist, author
- Spouse(s): Zhaleh Kazemi (div.); A'zam Gorgin
- Children: 1
- Relatives: Khosrow Golsorkhi (brother-in-law)

Iraj Gorgin (Persian: ایرج گرگین; February 14, 1934 – January 13, 2012) was an Iranian-American radio and television broadcaster and journalist.

== Early life ==
Iraj Gorgin was born to Mirza Ḥeydar Gorgin and Effat Azima. He graduated from Qarib High School in Shiraz (1952) and received his bachelor's degree in Persian literature from the University of Tehran (1957).

=== Political influences ===
Influenced by his two maternal uncles, Gorgin initially showed interest in the Pan-Iranist Party. However, he gave several lectures to the youth organization of the Tudeh Party of Iran. He did not, however, formally join any political party.

== Career ==
- Director of News Division of National Iranian Radio and Television Organization (NIRT) 1971–1975
- Director of NIRT Network II, 1975–1979
- Founder and Director of Radio Omid.

=== Radio and television career ===
Gorgin started his journalism career in 1955 as a managing editor of Cultural Kayhan, a weekly magazine of Kayhan national newspaper. In the same year, he joined Radio Iran as a reporter, producer, and news anchor. In 1961 he was appointed as the director of Radio Iran's newly established Radio Tehran. He produced and hosted a program on contemporary Persian poetry program while at National Iranian Radio and Television. His interview with Forough Farrokhzad in 1964 is considered as an exemplary recording of the poet's voice.

== Publications ==
- Gorgin, Iraj (2012). Hope & Liberty (Persian Language ed.). Ketab corp. ISBN 978-1-59584-344-9.
