= Javad Yasari =

Iranian Street singer of popular music (born 1947)

- Born: August 29, 1944 (age 82); Tehran, Iran
- Genres: Pop
- Occupation: Singer
- Years active: 1973–present
- Labels: Taraneh Records, Caltex Records, Avang Music

Javad Yasari (Persian: جواد یساری) (born August 29, 1944) is an Iranian Street singer (Persian: کوچه بازاری) of popular music.

He comes from the South of Tehran, and started singing in 1972 with the song called Black Money (Persian: پول سیاه). He released five albums in Iran before the 1979 Iranian Revolution. After the revolution, Javad Yasari holds concerts in the United Arab Emirates most days of the year, and every few years he also holds European concerts. Before the revolution of 1973, he released five albums, the last of which was the album "Spideh Dem" with a song of the same name. In 2017, after 40 years of the Iranian Revolution, a license was issued to play a song by him in the movie "Enemy of Women" (2016) directed by Hossein Farah Bakhsh. Yasari played his own role in this film in a short role. He performed the song "Shakhe Nabat" (Love) in this film. A few years later, he performed the company's song and several songs in the Nowruz special program for the year of 1402 TNT competition, directed and performed by Hamid. This program was broadcast from the Filmo platform.

== Family ==
Javad Yasari has three children named Reza, Mehdi (kamran) and Majid, Majid died abroad in 1995.

== Discography ==
=== Studio albums ===
Currently available albums include:

- Classics on Taraneh Records:
  - Asire Gham (1985)
  - Bacheha
  - Haft Asemoon (2008)
  - Sepideh Dam
- Pop on the Pars label:
  - Bot (2007)
  - Eshghe Man (Nov 2008)
