= Khosrow Golsorkhi =

Iranian journalist and activist (1944–1974)

Khosro Golsorkhi
- خسرو گلسرخی
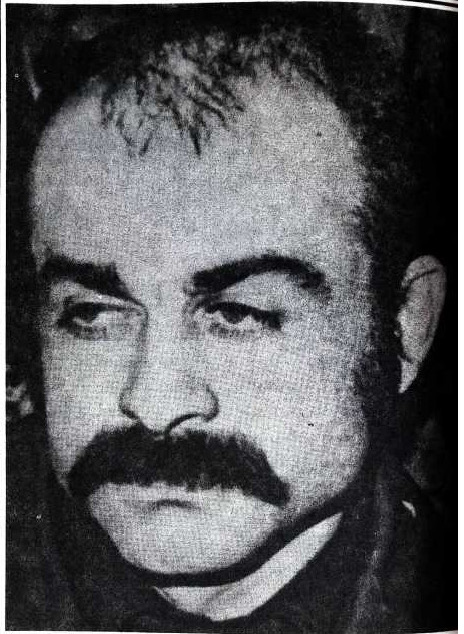
- Born: 23 January 1944; Rasht, Iran
- Died: 18 February 1974 (aged 30); Tehran, Iran
- Cause of death: Execution by firing squad
- Occupations: Journalist, poet and communist activist
- Spouse: Atefeh Gorgin (m. 1968)
- Children: 1
- Relatives: Iraj Gorgin (brother-in-law)

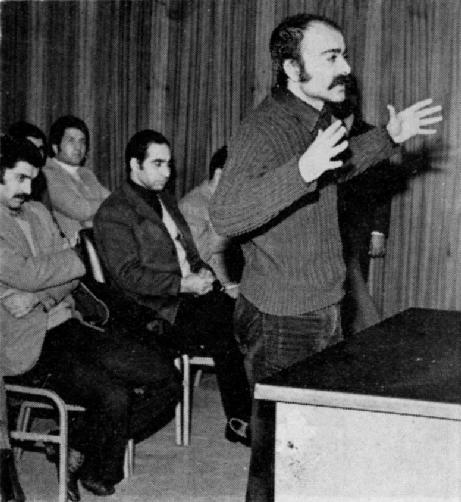
Golsorkhi defending himself in the military court

Khosrow Golsorkhi (Persian: خسرو گلسرخی; 23 January 1944 – 18 February 1974) was an Iranian journalist, poet, and Marxist activist. Golsorkhi was the chief editor of the art section for Kayhan newspaper in 1969, where he gained popularity for his leftist and revolutionary poetry.

At a time of heightened guerilla activity (see Siahkal incident), Khosrow Golsorkhi supported underground leftist movements in Iran and the world during the Cold War. He was arrested along with Keramat Daneshian, a director and close friend, and other activists, when a plot to kidnap Reza Pahlavi, Crown Prince of Iran was foiled. In a military trial and with foreign press in attendance, Golsorkhi's televised defense of leftist stance and criticism of the Pahlavi regime made him, as Hooman Majd described, a "Che Guevara-like figure for young Iranians." He was convicted for participating in the plot, sentenced to death and executed alongside Daneshian on 18 February 1974.

== Early life ==
Khosrow Golsorkhi was born on 23 January 1944 in Rasht, Gilan. After the death of his father Ghadir, at the age of 5, he and his family moved to his maternal grandfather's home in Qom, where he completed his upper-secondary education at the Hakim-Nezami high school. Following the death of his grandfather, Golsorkhi, now 19, and his brothers moved to Tehran, where he began writing.

== Arrest, Trial and execution ==
=== Background ===
At the time, the shah's regime was blamed for the deaths (by a car accident) of the poet Forough Farrokhzad, a woman who promised the appearance of someone who would "distribute bread and cough mixture equally", the tragic and suspect death of the folk hero and Olympic gold medalist wrestler Gholamreza Takhti in a hotel, the drowning of the writer Samad Behrangi in the river Aras, Ali Shariati's death abroad, and the tortures, killings and executions of those who had taken to an armed uprising against the regime.

=== Trial ===
At his trial in 1974, just as it looked as if the [military] judges were getting the upper hand he turned the atmosphere of the court: "In the glorious name of the people. I will defend myself in a court which I neither recognise its legality nor its legitimacy. As a Marxist my address is to the people and history. The more you attack me the more I pride myself, the further I am from you the closer I am to the people. The more your hatred for my beliefs, the stronger the kindness and support of the people. Even if you bury me—and you certainly will—people will make flags and songs from my corpse".

When colonel Ghaffarzadeh, the chief judge, admonished him to stick to his defence he replied with a wry smile: "are you frightened of my words?". The judge shouted back "I order you shut up and sit down". Eyes flashing in anger Golesorkhi spoke passionately "Don't you give me any orders. Go and order your corporals and squadron leaders. I doubt if my voice is loud enough to awaken a sleeping conscience here. Don't be afraid. Even in this so-called respectable court, bayonets protect you". Earlier Golesorkhi had defended himself: "Iranian society should know that I am here being tried and condemned to death purely for holding Marxist views. My crime is not conspiracy, nor an assassination but my views. In this court, in the presence of foreign journalists, I accuse the court, the fabricators of the dossier against me and against the irresponsible judges. I draw the attention of all human rights authorities, committees, and organisations to witness this stage managed farce, this state crime that is about to take place.

The military court did not even give itself the trouble of reading my file. I am a Marxist-Leninist, I respect Islamic sharia' and will shout my views, for which I die, in a loud voice: nowhere in the world, in countries like ours which are dependent to and dominated by neo-colonialism, can a truly national government exist unless a Marxist infrastructure is created in society".

Golsorkhi was given the opportunity to read a speech in his own defense. He began with some eloquence comparing the struggle of the Iranian left with that of Imam Hussein, the revered martyr of Shia Islam. He then continued to discuss the evils of land reform, as practiced by the Shah's regime, and the struggles of the Iranian peasants who first labored under the feudal system in Iran and then under the corrupt land reform. At this point, the chief judge of the military tribunal told him that he should limit his speech to his own defense. Golsorkhi responded by saying that his defense is the defense of the masses against tyranny. The chief judge said, once again, that he should only defend himself. Golsorkhi picked up his papers and said: "I will then sit down. I will not speak and I will sit down." He sat down and did not speak in his own defense any further. Once asked if he will continue his terrorist business he answered "Yes".

When the judge announced death sentences on both Daneshian and Golesorkhi they merely smiled. They then shook hands and embraced. "Comrade!" said Golesorkhi. "My best comrade!" replied Daneshian. Golsorkhi's execution was broadcast on state television. The court became a symbol of the Shah's dictatorship and hypocrisy, due to its content most of the trial proceedings was censored. After the 1979 revolution the entire trial was shown on public television, but again it was censored after the fall of Mehdi Bazargan's government. He was executed, and was acclaimed a hero by socialist Guerrillas because he wished not to be blind-folded.

=== Execution ===
The cell in which they spent their last night [February 17, 1974] in Jamshidiyeh prison was covered with slogans. They sang revolutionary songs all night, ate their supper quietly, shouted slogans to the soldiers in the lorry which took them to the Chitgar execution field, refused blindfolds so that they could see the red dawn and sang together in firm voice: "O comrades! Heroes! We will give our life for our country without fear ... They then themselves gave the order to fire!

Golesorkhi had written: "A person has an artistic eye whose art has a wider link with the people. ... an artist has a style that forges a link to the life of the people of his land and keeps the torch of struggle alight in them. This style may not fit any literary school, just as the poetry of the Palestinian Fadayeens does not. Why should it fit any literary school. Why imprison our poetry, which is our only effective art form, in literary and stylistic schools? The place of a poem is not in libraries, but in tongues and minds. Literature must retain the role it always had in social movements for us too in the displacement of social order, and fulfill it. The role of literature is to awaken. The role of progressive literature is to create social movements and to help attain the goals of historic development of peoples".

== In the poetry of poets ==
Aminullah Rezaei, one of his intellectual and poet friends in his youth, wrote this long poem for him (and called him: Red Rose), despite his opposition to and criticism of his political activities:

...Before sunrise

I will come

With a flag raised from the blood

On the top of the cloud

I will stand

I will write a song in your name

The most romantic:

O freedom

You are a lost debt in the homeland

That song

Your sorrow

Languages

In seven reeds

They repeat...

== "One Is Not Equal to One" ==
Golsorkhi wrote this poem in the mid-1970s when several guerrilla movements were formed in Iran to fight against Mohammad Reza Shah. During the last decade before the Islamic Revolution in 1979, different groups such as Mujahedin, Islamist extremists, and Lefties united for their mutual goal: Bringing the Shah down. Several were arrested. Shah showed mercy on most of the ones who asked for pardon, but the ones who did not withdraw their beliefs were executed.

Shedding light on the inequalities of human societies, the poem contrasts mathematics and the reality of human life. When the math teacher says “one is equal to one”, a student rises to remind everyone if “one human being is one unit”, this equation is not at all true. The student continues giving examples of how “black” and “white” are not equal. With the simple language of a primary school student, he criticizes capitalism telling “if one were equal to one, how would it be possible for the rich to get richer?”. He also talks about the peasants and how they die of “poverty” while the higher social classes expand their wealth every day. In the end, the teacher is convinced one is not equal to one and asks his students to write it down in their notebooks.

The teacher was shouting at the board.

He flushed angrily

and his hands were covered with chalk dust.

The students in the last row of seats were eating fruits and making noises;

on the other side of the class a student was flipping through a magazine.

None of the students were paying attention

because the teacher was shouting and pointing to the algebraic equations.

The teacher wrote on the blackboard, which reminded us of darkness and cruelty,

1=1

one is equal to one.

One of the students rose

(always one must rise)

and said softly,

“The equation is a blunder.”

The teacher was shocked

and the student asked,

“If one human being was one unit

Does one equal one, still?”

It was a difficult question and the students were silent.

The teacher shouted,

“Yes, it is equal!”

The student laughed,

“If one human being was one unit,

the one who had power and money would be greater than the poor one

who had nothing but a kind heart.

If one human being was one unit,

the one who was white would be greater than the one who was black.

If one human being was one unit,

equality would be ruined.

If one were equal to one

how would it be possible for the rich to get richer?

Or who would build China’s wall?

If one were equal to one,

who would die of poverty?

or who would die of lashing?

If one were equal to one,

who would imprison the liberals?

The teacher cried:

“Please write in your notebooks

one is not equal to one.”
