= Keramat Daneshian =

Iranian activist

Keramat Daneshian (1944, Shiraz – 18 February 1974, Tehran) (کرامت‌الله دانشیان) was an Iranian director, poet and communist activist. In 1974, he was convicted, along with Khosrow Golsorkhi, of plotting to kidnap the Shah of Iran's son, allegedly to pressure SAVAK into releasing certain imprisoned members of his group. They were both later executed.
