= Mohammad Ali Inanloo =

Television and radio host, actor, sports expert, journalist

- محمدعلی اینانلو
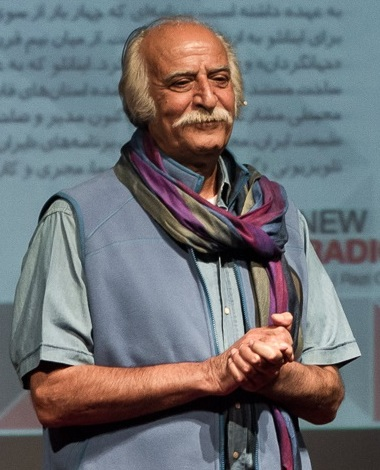
- Inanloo in 2015
- Born: 22 March 1947; Esmatabad, Buin Zahra, Iran
- Died: 2 January 2016 (aged 68); Atieh Hospital, Tehran, Iran
- Resting place: Esmatabad, Buin Zahra, Iran
- Occupation(s): TV host, documentary producer
- Years active: 1970–2015

Mohammad Ali Inanloo (1947 – 2015; Persian: محمدعلی اینانلو) was a television and radio host, actor, sports expert, journalist, and nature expert and documentary maker. He was known as the oldest volleyball reporter and commentator in Iran and the founder of environmental journalism. He had a 40-year history of nature tourism in Iran and documented his learnings in writing and film.
