= Rabiollah Kabiri =

Iranian politician

Rabi-ollah Kabiri

Road, Post and Telegraph Minister of Azerbaijan's Government
- In office 1945–1946

Personal details
- Born: 1889 Maragheh, Iran
- Died: 1947 (aged 57–58) Iran
- Party: Azerbaijani Democratic Party

Rabi-ollah Kabiri (Azerbaijani: Mirzə Rəbi Kəbiri, Persian: ربيع‌الله كبيري ; 1889 in Maragheh – 1947) was an Iranian Azerbaijani general and politician. In 1945, he became Road, Post and Telegraph Minister of Azerbaijan People's Government of northern Iran in a cabinet led by Ja'far Pishevari.
