= Rasool Vatandoust =

Iranian archeologist

Abdolrasool Vatandoust Haghighi
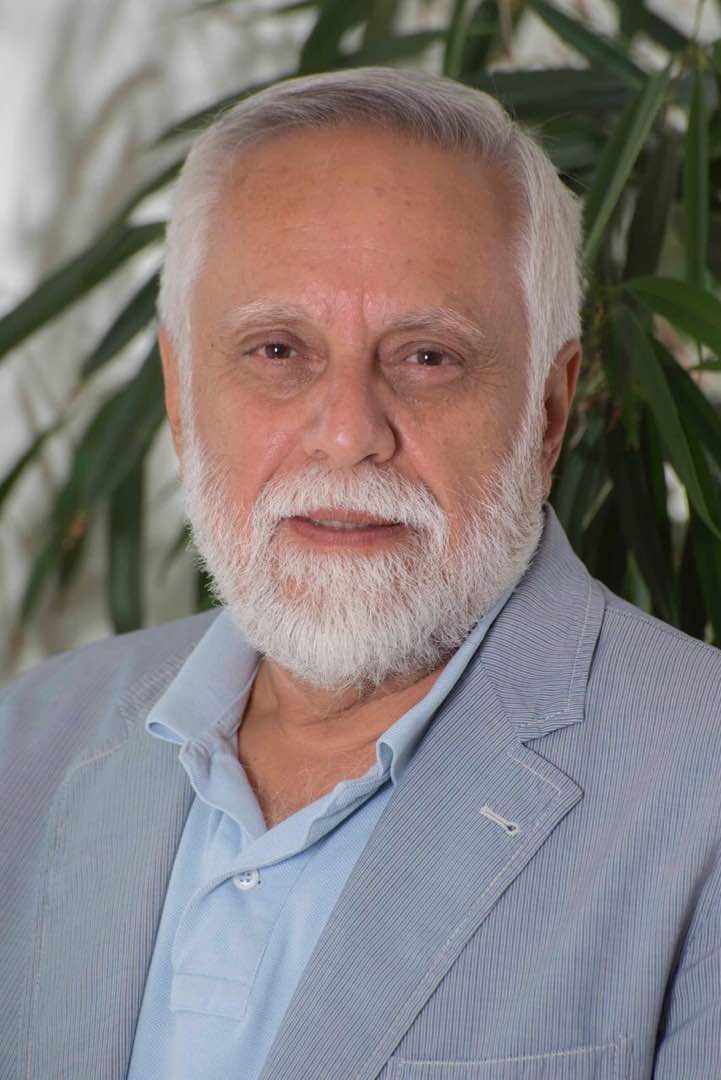
- Born: 17 July 1947; Isfahan, Iran
- Education: BSc in Chemistry, University of Tehran PhD in Conservation of Cultural Properties, London University
- Occupations: Founder and Ex-director of the Research Centre for Conservation and Restoration of Cultural Relics (RCCCR), Tehran, University Professor, Islamic Azad University, Tehran, Chairman, IRAN ICOM Conservation Committee
- Years active: Since 1971
- Notable work: Founder of the Research Centre for the Conservation and Restoration of Cultural Relics, Tehran; UNESCO expert in conservation of cultural heritage in a number of international programs; Ex-council member (Three times), International Centre for the Study of the Preservation and Restoration of Cultural Property (ICCROM); Ex-Executive Committee member (Three times), International Council on Monuments and Sites (ICOMOS); One of the founders of academic programs in the field of conservation and restoration of cultural properties in various universities in Iran.

Abdolrasool Vatandoust Haghighi (Persian: عبدالرسول وطن‌دوست حقیقی; born 17 July 1947) is an Iranian archaeologist.

== Early life ==
Vatandoust was born in Isfahan, Iran, on 17 July 1947. Being originally from Shiraz, he lived in Tehran from his childhood. Vatandoust completed his high school (Oloom High School, Tehran) in 1965 and on the same year and after passing the universities entrance examination was admitted to the Faculty of Science, University of Tehran.

== Education ==
After receiving his BSc degree in Chemistry in 1969 and completing his mandatory military service he joined the then Archaeological Centre of Iran to help, with collaboration of others, with establishing the first conservation and restoration laboratory there.

== Career ==
After returning to Iran, Vatandoust continued his career in the Archaeological Centre of Iran and further developed, with the help and cooperation of his colleagues, the conservation laboratory (Currently this laboratory which is located in the basement of the Research Centre for Archaeology, is part of the National Museum of Iran Conservation Laboratory).

In 1987 he submitted a proposal to the then Iranian Cultural Heritage Organisation for the creation of the Central Research Laboratory for the Conservation of Cultural Properties, and upon receiving the Organisation's agreement he began the project. It was soon completed and opened. Simultaneously he succeeded in securing the approval for the construction of a building to house the laboratory.

The building was constructed on a piece of land in front of National Museum of Iran. In December 2005 the building was officially opened and housed the Research Centre for the Conservation of Cultural Relics (RCCCR), an institution he had established after creation of the Central Laboratory for Conservation. Management of the Bureau for International Relations was among his other responsibilities in the cultural heritage section of the country. Vatandoust was retired from the Cultural Heritage, Handicrafts and Tourism Organisation of Iran in 2009.

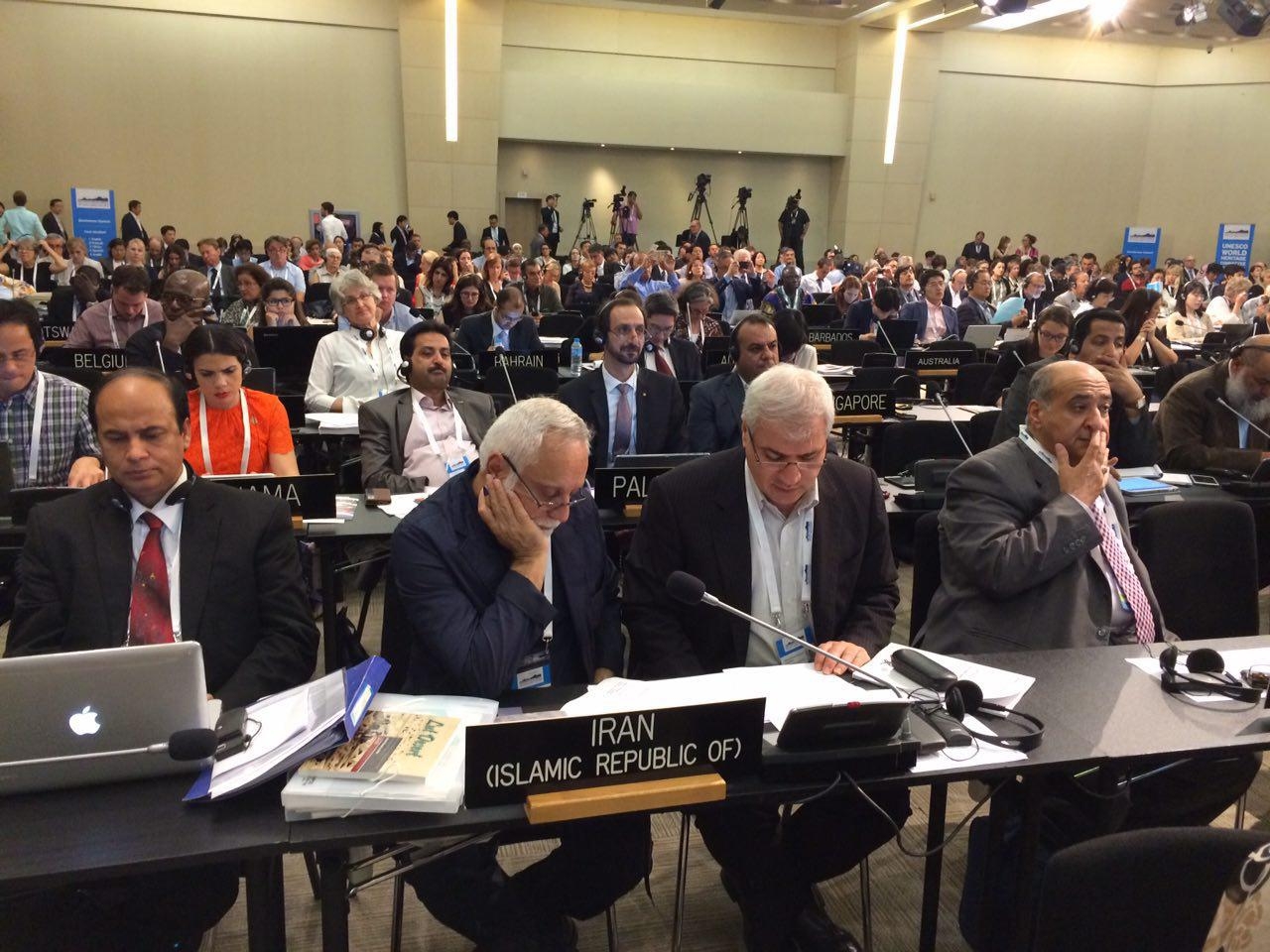
in the 41st session of the UNESCO World Heritage Committee, Kraków, 2017

== Academic activities ==
Vatandoust came to Iran in 1975 to cooperate in establishing an academic course on the restoration of cultural properties in Pardis-e Isfahan, affiliated to Farabi University. Accordingly, he began his teaching career at this college from 1975 alongside scholars such as Mohammad Karim Pirnia and Jamshid Behnam.

== Excerpt of activities in the field of conservation and restoration of cultural properties ==
- Founder of the Central Research Laboratory for the Conservation and Restoration of Cultural Properties, Iranian Cultural Heritage Organisation, 1990.
- Founder of the Research Centre for the Conservation and Restoration of Historical/Cultural Objects, Iranian Cultural Heritage Organisation, Tehran, 1993.
- Founder of the Research Centre for the Conservation and Restoration of Cultural Relics (RCCCR), Iranian Cultural Heritage, Handicrafts and Tourism Organisation, Tehran, 1996.
- Founder of Yadman Science and Conservation Co. (YSC), 2009.

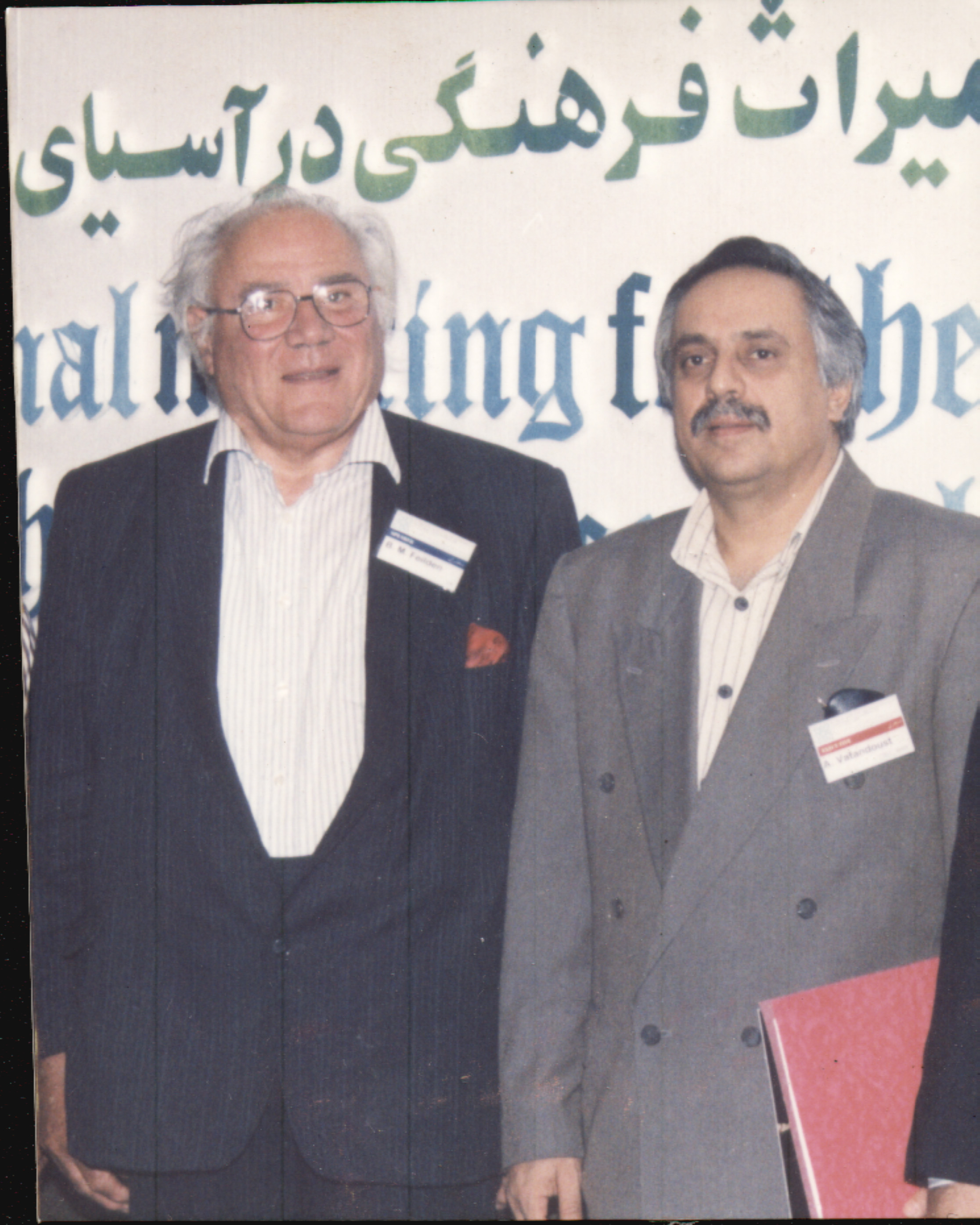
With Sir Bernard Feilden, Tehran, 1995

== Excerpt of scientific and executive activities ==
- Chairman and Secretary General, Millennial of the Construction of the Qabus Tomb Tower, 5 & 6 May 1997, Gonbad -e Qabus, Iran.
- Chairman and coordinator, First Regional Course on Conservation of Stone in Central and Western Asia, 9 – 23 April 1998, Persepolis (Shiraz) & Bisotun (Kermanshah), Iran. A joint project with ICCROM.
- Chairman, Regional Training Course on Conservation Practices for Safeguarding of Archaeological and Historical Earthen Architecture, 18 February 8 March 2002, Haft Tappeh – Chogha Zanbil, Iran.
- Chairman and executive officer for the 9th International Conference on the Study and Conservation of Earthen Architecture (Terra 2003), Yazd, Iran, 2003.
- President, Committee for the Studies on Old Mining and Metallurgy, Iranian Cultural Heritage Organisation, since 1998 - 2006.
- Chairman, First and Second Annual Seminars on Old Mining and Metallurgy in Iran, 1998 and 2001, Tehran.
- National Coordinator, International Project on the Conservation of Chogha Zanbil, ICHTO/UNESCO/Japan Trust Fund Project, Iran, 1998 – 2008.

== Contributions to the international organisations & NGOs ==
- Council member, International Centre for the Study of Conservation and Restoration of Cultural Property (ICCROM), 2001-2003; 2004-2009; and 2009-2013.
- Member of the UNESCO's International Coordination Committee for Safeguarding of Afghanistan's Cultural Heritage.
- Member of the International Coordination Committee for Safeguarding of Iraq's Cultural Heritage.
- Member of the UNESCO team for preparation of the strategy for Al-Ain Cultural Heritage, United Arab Emirates.
- Member of the Executive Committee of the International Campaign for the Establishment of the Nubia Museum in Aswan and the National Museum of Egyptian Civilization in Cairo.
- Chairman, XXIII Session of General Assembly of ICCROM, International Centre for the Study of the Preservation and the Restoration of Cultural Property (ICCROM), 19 – 21 November 2003, Rome, Italy.
- Co-opted Member of the Executive Committee of International Council on Monuments and Sites (ICOMOS).

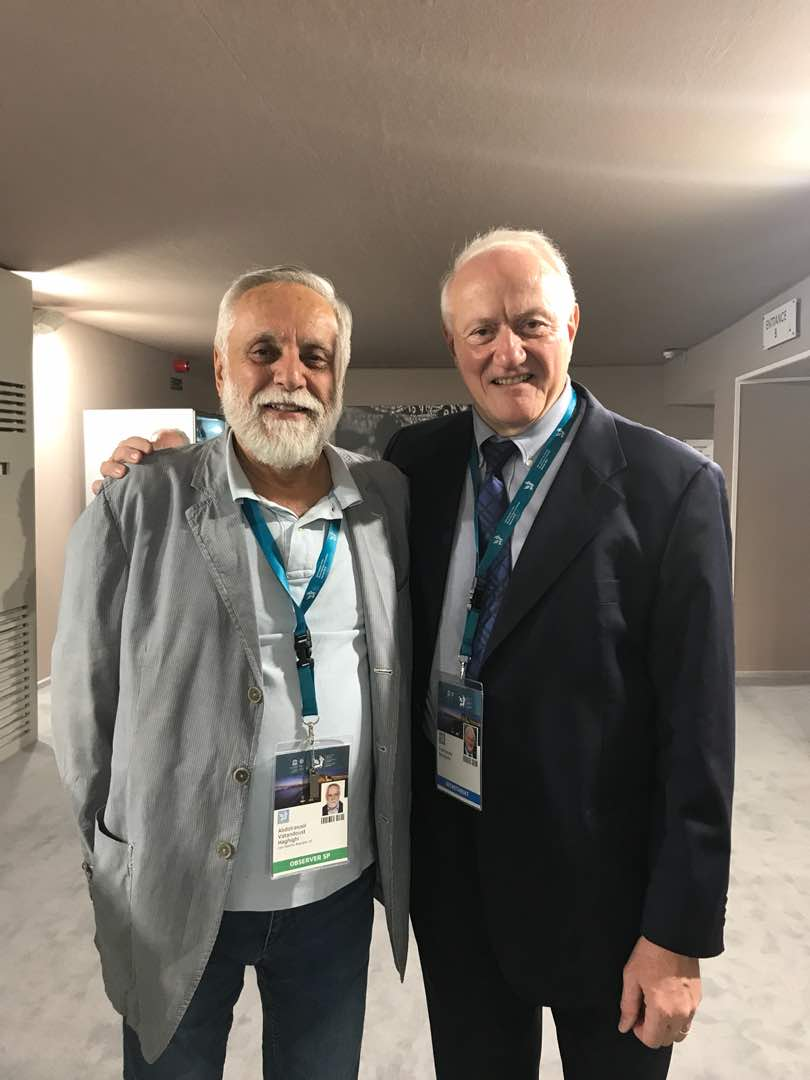
With Francesco Bandarin (the UNESCO Ex-Assistant Director-General for Culture), Bahrain, 2018

== Selected publications ==
- Translation of "Stone decay and conservation", G. G. Amoroso & V. Fassina to Persian Language,ISBN 9780444421463, 1992.
- Translation of "The Conservation of Antiquities and Works of Art", H. J. Plenderleith to Persian language, ISBN 9780192129512, 1984.
- ICCROM, Final Report, 1998, 31 July, "Assessment of the damage to the Iranian Cultural Heritage caused by the increase in Air Pollution Resulting from the Persian Gulf Crisis".
- “Conservation Science: the needs and potentials”, University Postgraduate Curricula for Conservation Scientists; Proceeding of the International Seminar, Bologna, Italy, 26–27 November 1999, ISBN 92-9077-166-6, 2000 ICCROM.
- “Preliminary report on archaeometallurgical investigations around the prehistoric site of Arisman near Kashan, western Central Iran”, Archäologische Mitteilungen aus Iran und Turan, Band 32, 2000.
- Pre-print of Papers, 9th International Conference on the Study and Conservation of Earthen Architecture, Terra 2003, Yazd – IRAN, 29 November – 2 December 2003.
- "The earthquake catastrophe in Bam, Iran – future strategies for a destroyed city made of earth", LEHM 2004, Tagungsbeiträge der 4. 4th International Conference on Building with Earth, ISBN 3-00-014864-7, 2004, pp 221–233.
- Alter Bergbau und Metallurgie in Iran – Vergangenheit und Zukunft einer Forschungsperspektive, “Persiens Antike Pracht, Bergbau – Handwerk – Archäologie”, Katalog der Ausstellung des Deutschen Bergbau-Museums Bochum, Band 1, pp 2–7, Bochum 2004.
- “Persiens Antiike Pracht, Bergbau – Handwerk – Archäologie”, Katalog der Ausstellung des Deutschen Bergbau-Museums Bochum, vom 28. November 2004 bis 29. Mai 2005, Band 1, Bochum 2004.
- “Persiens Antike Pracht, Bergbau – Handwerk – Archäologie”, Katalog der Ausstellung des Deutschen Bergbau-Museums Bochum, vom 28. November 2004 bis 29. Mai 2005, Band 2, Bochum 2004.
- "Application of Nd:YAG and CO2 lasers for Cleaning the Corrosion of Bronze and Copper Historical Objects", Journal of Nuclear Science and Technology, No. 34, 2005, (3).
- “Early Mining and Metallurgy on the Western and Central Iranian Plateau”, The first Five Years of Work, Archäologie in Iran und Turan, Band 9, Deutsches Archäologisches Institut, Eurasien-Abteilung, 2011.
- “The Archaeological Site of Konar Sandal, Jiroft, Iran: Conservation Earthen Architecture”, Proceedings of Terra 2008: The 10th International Conference on the Study and Conservation of Earthen Architectural Heritage, The Getty Conservation Institute, 2011.
- “Consolidation and Reinforcement of Destabilised Earthen Structures in Bam after the earthquake of December 2003: Some New Approaches”, Proceedings of Terra 2008: The 10th International Conference on the Study and Conservation of Earthen Architectural Heritage, The Getty Conservation Institute, 2011.
- “Development of earthen architecture in Iran”, TerrAsia 2011 (2011 International Conference on Earthen Architecture in Asia”, TERRAKorea+CRATerre, Mokpo, Republic of Korea, October 2011.
- Abdolrasool Vatandoust, Hermann Parzinger, Barbara Helwing; “Early Mining and Metallurgy on the Western Central Iranian Plateau”, The first five years of work, Archäologie Iran und Turan 9, Deutsches Archäologisches Institut, Eurasien-Abteilung, ISBN 9783805343428, 2011.
