= Abolhassan Diba =

Iranian politician, socialite, and businessman (1894–1982)

Abolhassan Diba Seghat od-Dowleh
- ابوالحسن دیبا
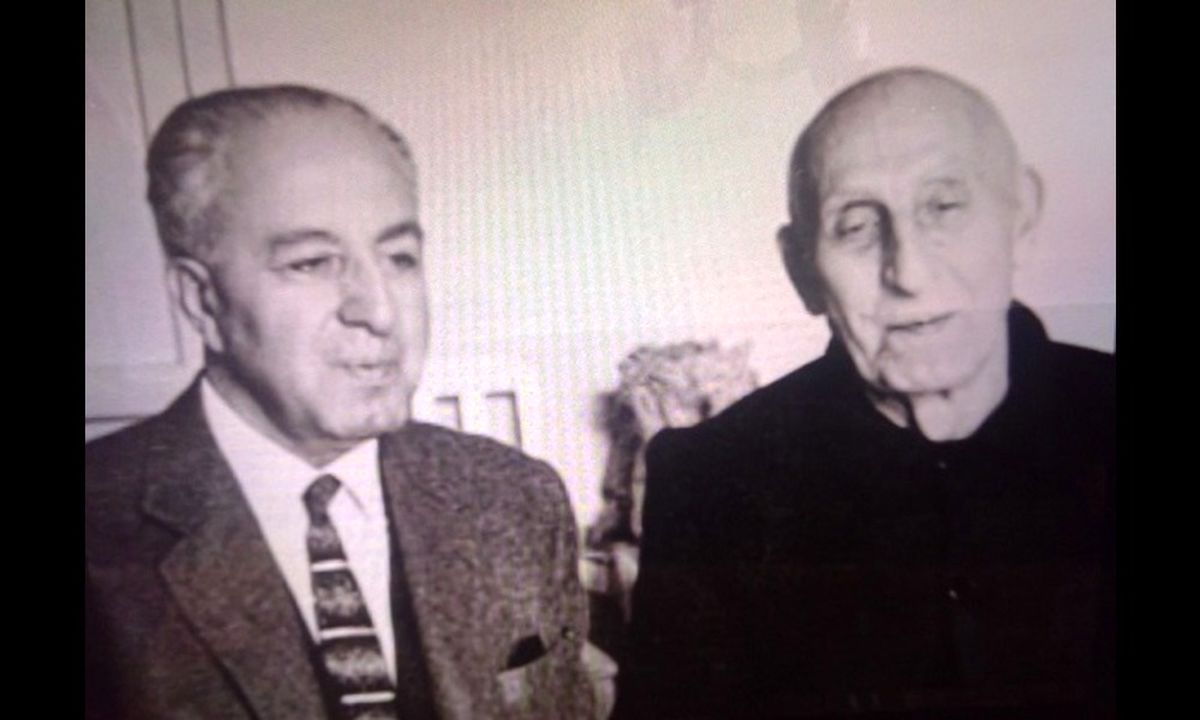
- (left) Abolhassan Diba with his half-brother Mohammad Mossadegh (right)

Personal details
- Born: 4 January 1894 Tabriz, Qajar Iran
- Died: 16 April 1982 (aged 88) Lausanne, Switzerland
- Parents: Fazlollah Vakil-el-Molk (father); Najm al-Saltaneh (mother)
- Relatives: Mohammad Mosaddegh (half-brother)
- Occupation: Politician, socialite, and businessman

Abolhassan Diba (Persian: ابوالحسن دیبا; 4 January 1894 – 16 April 1982), titled Seghat od-Dowleh (Persian: ثقه‌الدوله), was an Iranian politician, socialite, and businessman.

== Biography ==
Diba was born 4 January 1894 in Tabriz, Iran, to a well-established family which can trace its line from the 8th century. His mother, Princess Malektadj Firuz, was a princess of the (then reigning) Qajar dynasty and his father, Fazlollah Vakil-el-Molk, was a Private Aide to the Crown Prince, Mozaffar-ed-din Mirza. At birth, he was given the Qajar title of "Saghat-ed-Dowleh". At the death of his father, the family moved to Tehran in 1902.

In 1909, he accompanied his half-brother, Mohammad Mossadegh, to Switzerland and France, where he graduated from the Ecole des Sciences Politiques of the Sorbonne, with a degree in economics and administration. On his return to Iran after graduating college, he went into public office, becoming deputy minister of finance.

He married Pouran Vakili and is the father of Farhad and Malektadj Diba, all relatives of the former Queen Farah Pahlavi of Iran.

== Business ventures ==
After the coup d'état by Reza Khan (1921), he left government employ, sold his land holdings and entered into private business, which was frowned upon by his aristocratic peers at that time, setting up the firm of Diba & Bayat, which later became Abolhassan Diba and Company. He was innovative and forward-thinking, always seeking to bring modernity to Iran. In this quest, the following activities are worth mentioning:

1. He imported the first Leyland trucks into Iran (1921), to be used for road haulage instead of mules and camel caravans.
2. He introduced agricultural machinery (tractors, harvesters) to replace the use of bullocks.
3. A civil construction department was established to undertake the development of rail construction, bridges, buildings and roads. For this purpose, the first asphalting machinery was imported with which the company built some of the first paved roads in Iran.
4. Another section imported automobiles.
5. He was the first to bring mechanised accounting procedures to Iran, with an Electronic Digital Computer in 1957.
6. After World War II, the first lifts (passenger elevators) were installed in the first buildings of 4-stories and, later, a factory established which produced nearly all Iran's requirements.
7. He started the first hotel on modern western standards (Park Hotel, Tehran, 1940). In addition, he started the first local hotel training school, staffed by foreign instructors.
8. He introduced modern telephony, setting up the first automatic Teheran telephone exchange.

== Charitable and educational works ==
He was the administrator of a large charity hospital, established by his mother Najmieh. With all of these endeavours, he never lost sight of the human factor, sending hundreds to be trained abroad in whatever vocation they were employed. Thus, within these activities, there were a large number of experts in such varied fields as hotel management, chefs, doctors, nurses, mechanical engineers, electrical engineers, computer technicians, etc.

== Iranian revolution ==
In later life, he was devastated by the Iranian Revolution (1979–1980), which saw the wrecking of all his endeavours and the seizure by the clergy of all his assets, including the Park Hotel (which had grown to a 5-star 500-room complex). He had spent sixty years of his life investing his knowledge and his fortune in Iran, only to be forced into exile. The shock was such that he spent the last two years of his life in hospital and died in Lausanne, Switzerland on 16 April 1982.

== Ancestry ==
Ancestors of Abolhassan Diba

16.
8.
17.
4. Mirza Ali Tabatabai-Diba
18.
9.
19.
2. Fazlollah Diba
20.
10.
21.
5.
22.
11.
23.
1. Abolhassan Diba
24. Fath Ali Shah Qajar
12. Abbas Mirza Qajar
25. Asiyeh Khanum Qajar
6. Firoz Mirza Qajar
26. Haji Mirza Sadegh
13. Ezzat Nisa Khanum
27.
3. Najm al-Saltaneh Qajar
28. Fath Ali Shah Qajar
14. Bahman Mirza Qajar
29. Golbadan Baji
7. Homa Khanum Qajar
30.
15.
31.
