= Sarvar al-Saltaneh =

Iranian royal consort

Ashraf Malek Khanum
- Hazrat-e Olia; Sarvar al-Saltaneh

Senior consort of the Qajar shah
- Tenure: 1 May 1896 – 8 January 1907
- Spouse: Mozaffar ad-Din Shah Qajar (died 1907)
- Issue: Fakhr-ol-Dowleh
- House: Qajar
- Father: Firuz Mirza
- Mother: Hajieh Homa Khanoum

Ashraf Malek Khanum Sarvar al-Saltaneh (Persian: اشرف ملک خانم سرورالسلطنه), titled Hazrat-e Olya, was a Qajar princess, a daughter of Firuz Mirza, and the second official wife of Mozaffar ad-Din Shah Qajar after Taj ol-Molouk. She was one of the most powerful and influential women of the Qajar era.

== Biography ==
The exact year of Sarvar al-Saltaneh's marriage to Mozaffar ad-Din Shah is not known, but it was probably after Taj ol-Molouk had separated from him that she married the Shah. Sarvar al-Saltaneh held great authority at Mozaffar ad-Din Shah's court, and during her husband's time as crown prince, she acted as an intermediary, conveying people's complaints and petitions to him. Sarvar al-Saltaneh was the daughter of Firuz Mirza, a son of Crown Prince Abbas Mirza. She was the sister of Princess Najm al-Saltaneh, a philanthropist, and Prince Abdol-Hossein Farman Farma, a well-known statesman of the late Qajar era and the early Pahlavi era. She was the mother of Fakhr-ol-Dowleh.

Hazrat-e Olya was regarded as the most powerful lady of Mozaffar ad-Din Shah's harem. She was considered one of the pillars of the Qajar government and possessed very great influence and authority. She had been chosen to marry Crown Prince Mozaffar ad-Din Mirza, and this marriage created a very wide network of internal and external ties and relationships within the structure of power. Hazrat-e Olya, the powerful wife of Mozaffar ad-Din Shah, was a great lady of the court and the Shah's favorite, known by the title Aliya Hazrat. She was the sister of Farmanfarma and a close ally of the monarch. In political influence, she was considered no less significant than Malek Jahan Khanom, the mother of Naser al-Din Shah. She received the title Hazrat-e Olya from the Shah himself. Sarvar al-Saltaneh played an important role in the political advancement of her brother, Farmanfarma. After Naser al-Din Shah's assassination and the proclamation of Mozaffar ad-Din Shah's rule, it was through her will and efforts—using her influence and firm control over political affairs—that her brother rose to the position of Grand Vizier. Hazrat-e Olya was a serious and stern woman, strong-willed, extremely intelligent, and highly perceptive.

Sarvar al-Saltaneh's brother, Abdol-Hossein Mirza Farmanfarma, was himself a son-in-law of Mozaffar ad-Din Shah and benefited from his sister's influence. In Safar 1314 AH, he was appointed governor of Tehran, but he wanted the Ministry of War to be given to him instead. Amin al-Soltan, the Grand Vizier of Mozaffar ad-Din Shah, prevented this appointment. As a result, Farmanfarma held a grudge and took actions that undermined the work of the premiership. These nighttime meetings were almost certainly arranged through Sarvar al-Saltaneh, helping Farmanfarma present his petitions and requests directly to the Shah.

When Farmanfarma obtained the Ministry of War, Kosakovsky, the commander of the Cossack Brigade in Iran, reported on the factional divisions at Mozaffar ad-Din Shah's court. He wrote that the court was split into two groups: the first led by Hazrat-e Olya and her brother Farmanfarma, and the second led by Amir Bahador and his supporters. This division showed Sarvar al-Saltaneh's power and influence at court and illustrates how she was able to shape court politics. Abdol-Hossein Mirza Farmanfarma and Malek Taj Najm al-Saltaneh—the mother of Dr. Mohammad Mosaddegh—were Sarvar al-Saltaneh's brother and sister. After Farmanfarma was dismissed from the Ministry of War, he was appointed governor of Fars, but he was later exiled to the holy shrines in Iraq (the Atabat). At this time, through her mediation, Sarvar al-Saltaneh arranged for Ezzat al-Dowleh and three of Farmanfarma's sons to be sent to Baghdad. This action demonstrated her power and influence in protecting her family and shaping political decisions at court.

Many state officials rose to the height of power—or fell into disgrace—according to her will. Together with her sister Najm al-Saltaneh, the mother of Dr. Mosaddegh, Hazrat-e Olya took advantage of Mozaffar ad-Din Shah's weakness, poor health, and lack of resolve. She reviewed the Shah's correspondence, approved or rejected government decrees according to her own judgment, and directly interfered in the appointment and dismissal of state governors. The Shah, overwhelmed by her displays of authority, was hardly more than a powerless figure in her hands. Before Mozaffar ad-Din Shah came to the throne, Hazrat-e Olya bore him three daughters and one son. She sent them to the school in the Arg of Tabriz, where they lived and received an education. Her children, like most people around her, stood in awe of her. Her personality was so strong and influential that no historian has been able to ignore it. Although Hazrat-e Olya exercised a form of harsh or negative power, her political maneuvering and problem-solving abilities cannot be overlooked. She was, without doubt, a woman far ahead of her time.

In his memoirs, Kosakovsky compares Naser al-Din Shah and Mozaffar ad-Din Shah, noting their authority over the harem. He writes that Mozaffar ad-Din Shah did not even dare to make a sound in front of his wife, Hazrat-e Olya. This statement clearly shows Sarvar al-Saltaneh's power and control over her husband and the court. Ghahreman Mirza Ein al-Saltaneh also mentions in his diary the meticulousness of Sarvar al-Saltaneh, which led to her isolation, and he writes about her authority over the court. She exercised strict control over the harem and the royal household, while the other women lived in separate courtyards.

Ghahreman Mirza Ein al-Saltaneh also mentions in his diary the meticulousness of Sarvar al-Saltaneh, which led to her isolation, and writes about her authority over the court: "Now Hazrat-e Olya is the very essence of jealousy. She has imposed many strict rules and restrictions on the trusted members of the harem. The other women live in separate courtyards. They rarely enter the main palace unless the Shah wishes; otherwise, it is impossible. The attendants of the coffeehouse stay in the Shah's sleeping quarters and coffeehouse rooms, very quiet and polite. Hazrat-e Olya has surrounded them completely. They cannot utter a word."

Hazrat-e Olya was also one of the influential figures in Tabriz and counted among the prominent leaders of Azerbaijan. After Mohammad Ali Shah was deposed, many Qajar princes hoped to take the throne, and Hazrat-e Olya was also seeking power. She even tried to have her son, Naser al-Din Mirza, declared Shah. These efforts reflected her political ambitions and desire for influence at court.
