= Najm al-Saltaneh =

Iranian princess and philanthropist (1853–1932)

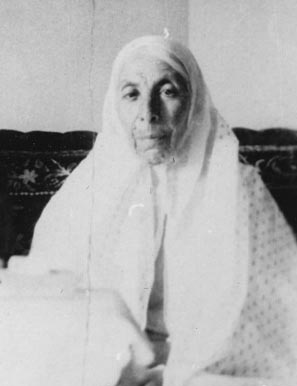
- Portrait of Najm
- Born: 1853; Tabriz, Qajar Iran
- Died: 4 November 1932; Najaf, Kingdom of Iraq
- Spouse: Mirza Hedayatollah Vazir-Daftar; Vakil al-Molk Diba (–1906)
- Issue: Mohammad Mosaddegh; Abolhassan Diba
Names
- Malek Taj Firouz; Badr al-Molouk Qajar
- Dynasty: Qajar
- Father: Firuz Mirza
- Mother: Homa Khanum
- Family: Abdol-Hossein Farman Farma (brother); Sarvar al-Saltaneh (sister)

Badr al-Molouk Qajar or Malek Taj Firouz (1853 – 4 November 1932), titled Najm al-Saltaneh (Persian: نَجم‌السلطنه), was an Iranian princess of the Qajar dynasty and the founder of Tehran's first modern hospital, Najmieh Hospital.

== Early life ==
Najm was the daughter of Firuz Mirza and his second wife, Homa Khanum. She was a sister of Prince Abdol-Hossein Farman Farma (1852–1939), a prominent politician of modern Iran. Najm's sister, Sarvar al-Saltaneh, married Mozaffar ad-Din Shah as his eleventh wife.

According to the customs of the time when it came to women who belonged to royalty and the nobility, Najm, her sisters, and her mother, would have lived secluded in the Qajar harem and andaruni (private inner quarters). Women of Najm's station received an education with a focus on administering a household and child-rearing, though she was taught to write in Persian most likely by a private tutor. Najm's mother was deeply devout and would have seen that her daughter was educated in religion.

Short and with pale skin, Najm was considered a beauty. Najm's great-grandfather was Fath-Ali Shah and through her family connections and marriages she was closely connected and related to the highest echelons of society, which also made her a very eligible match.

== First marriage ==
She was married to her first husband Murtaza Quli Khan Vakil ol-Molk Esfandiyari, son of the governor of Kerman, when she was fourteen or sixteen-years old.

From this marriage, she had two daughters, Zarrin Taj Hajieh Showkat od-Dowleh and Eshrat od-Dowleh.

After the death of her father-in-law, her husband assumed the governorship over Kerman between 1869 and 1879. However, due to riots in the province during his governorship and his own serious financial difficulties, he was recalled to Tehran in 1880 where he died later that same year.

== Second marriage ==
Najm married a second time to Mirza Hedayatollah Vazir-Daftar, with whom she had Mohammad Mosaddegh and Amina Daftar al-Moluk. Her second husband died from cholera in 1893.

== Third marriage ==
Najm remarried a third time to, Mozaffer al-Din's private secretary, Vakil al-Molk Diba with whom she had a son, Abolhassan Diba. After her third husband's death in 1906 she dedicated herself to furthering the affairs of her family.

She was also a great friend, cousin and sister-in-law of Princess Fatima Khanum Izzat al-Dawlah, one of the most educated daughters of Mozaffar ad-Din Shah Qajar (1907–1853).

Najm al-Saltaneh loved to write. Much of the correspondence between herself and her brother, Farman Farma, is preserved in Tehran. She was also active in social affairs as her mother built schools and mosques.

Najm, had hoped to marry her niece, Fakr-od-Doleh to her eldest son. The engagement was finalized in 1896, but then her brother Farmanfarman was accused of attempting to depose the shah and sentenced to exile. This led to her sister Sorour breaking of off the engagement. Najm's husband was also removed from the position of the shah´s private secretary. The fall of her brother, disgrace of her husband and betrayal from her sister caused Najm some mental distress and she decided to commit suicide by taking opium. She was, however, saved by the intervention of a physician attached to the British embassy. Najm´s niece was instead married to Amin od-Dowleh in 1898.

Najm did in the end manage to find a wife for her son in Zahra-Khanom, the daughter of Sayyed Zain al- Abidin; Tehrans friday prayer imam. Najm then is said to have told her sister that even if her sister hadn´t given her son the Shah's daughter, he would have the daughter of the Shah of religion.

In the 1910s, Najm lived with her eldest son and his family in Neuchâtel, while he was pursuing a law degree at the University of Neuchâtel.

== Activism ==
Najm founded Najmieh Hospital in 1926, with the building opening in 1927.

== Death ==
She died in 1932 and was buried in Najaf.

== Issue ==
- Showkat al-Dowleh, married Sahm-al-Molk. Her son Ezatollah Bayat would later marry his cousin Zia Ashraf the daughter of his maternal uncle Mohammed Mossadegh.
- Esrat al-Dowleh, married Mirzā ʿAli Movaṯṯaq-al-Salṭana
- Mohammed Mossadegh, married Zahra Khanom
- Amena, married her cousin Noṣrat-al-Dowla (killed by Reza Shah) married secondly Azod-al-Salṭana son of Mozaffar al-Din Shah. With issue.
  - Mozaffar Firouz
- Abolhassan Diba
