= Najmieh Hospital =

First modern private hospital in Tehran

Najmieh
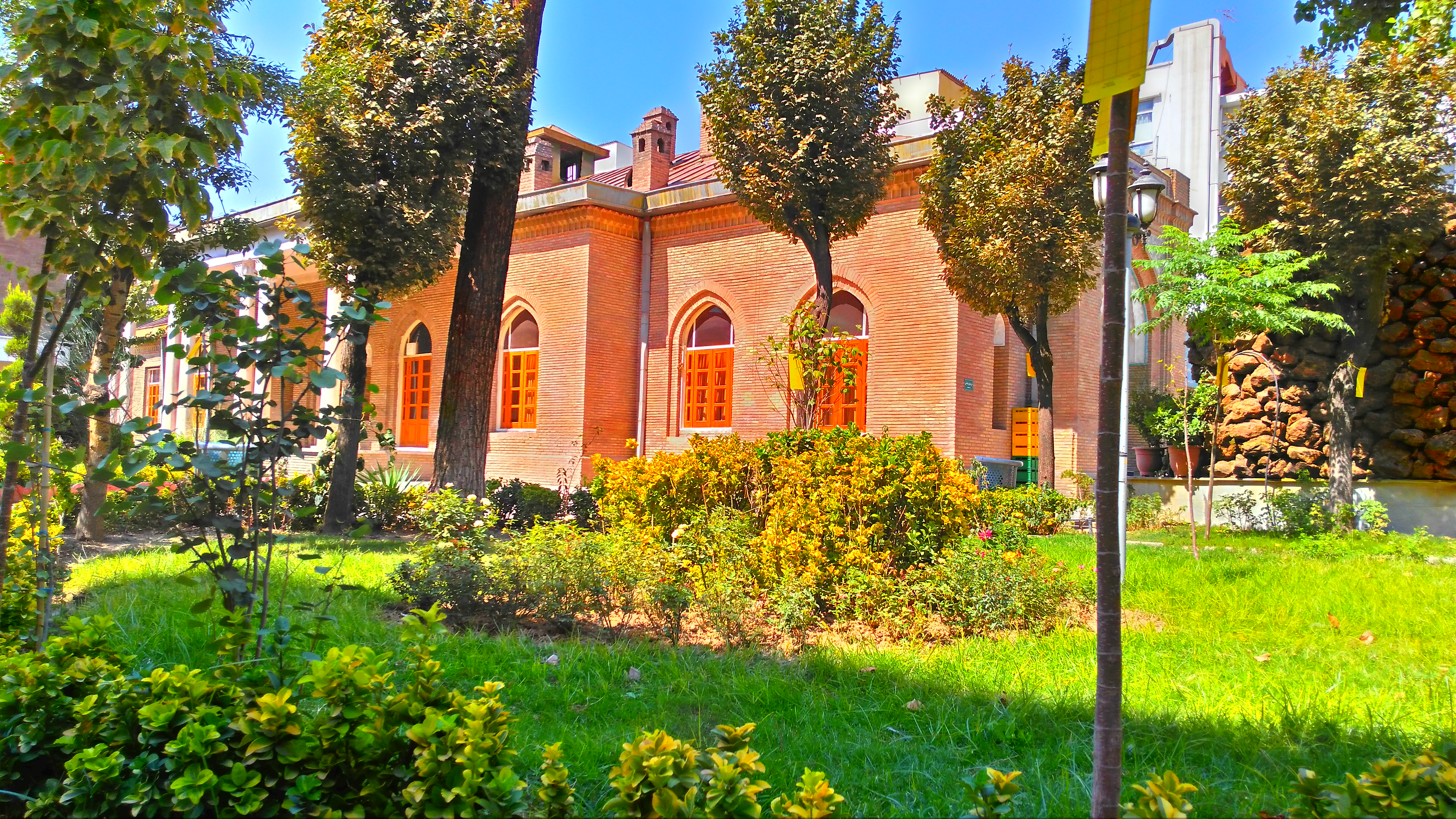

Geography
- Location: Hafez Street, Tehran, Iran
- Coordinates: 35°41′39.5″N 51°24′39.43″E

Organisation
- Type: General

Links
- Lists: Hospitals in Iran

Najmieh Hospital (Persian: مریض‌خانه نجمیه) is located in Tehran, Iran. The hospital is situated south of Jomhuri, on Hafez Street. Its original building belongs to the early-Pahlavi architectural style. On 4 August 2003, it was declared part of the Iranian Cultural Heritage and registered under number 9494. Najmieh is also on the list of Iranian Endowment Organization.

== History ==
The founder of the hospital endowment was Malektaj Firuz (Najm al-Saltaneh), the daughter of Qajar prince Firuz Mirza. She made Mohammad Mosaddegh and his descendants the custodians of the hospital with the proviso that the custody would go to her other son Abolhassan Diba after Mohammad Mosaddegh's death.

Najmieh was the first modern private hospital in Tehran with a special fund earmarked for the care of poor patients.

== Gallery ==
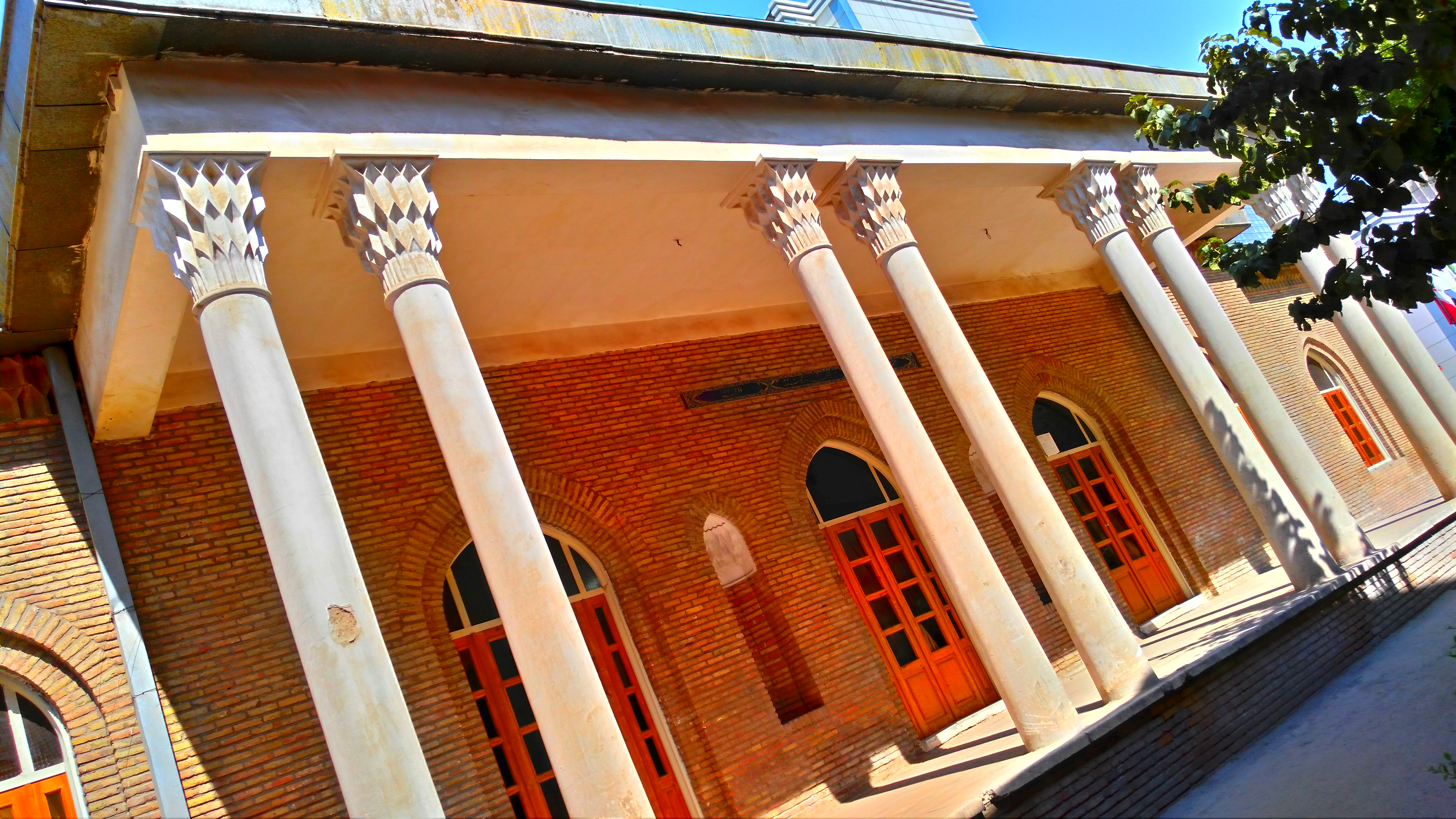

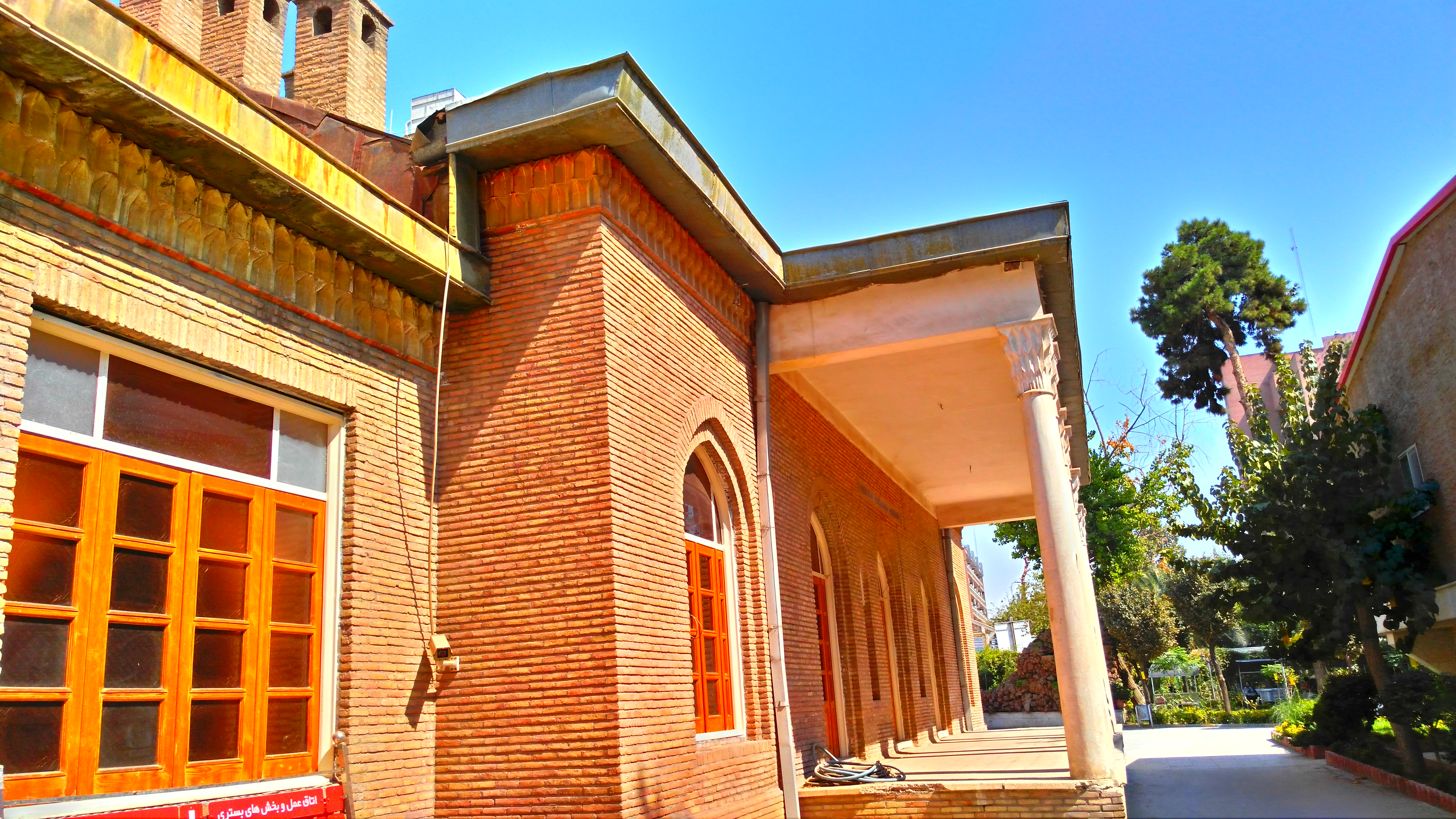

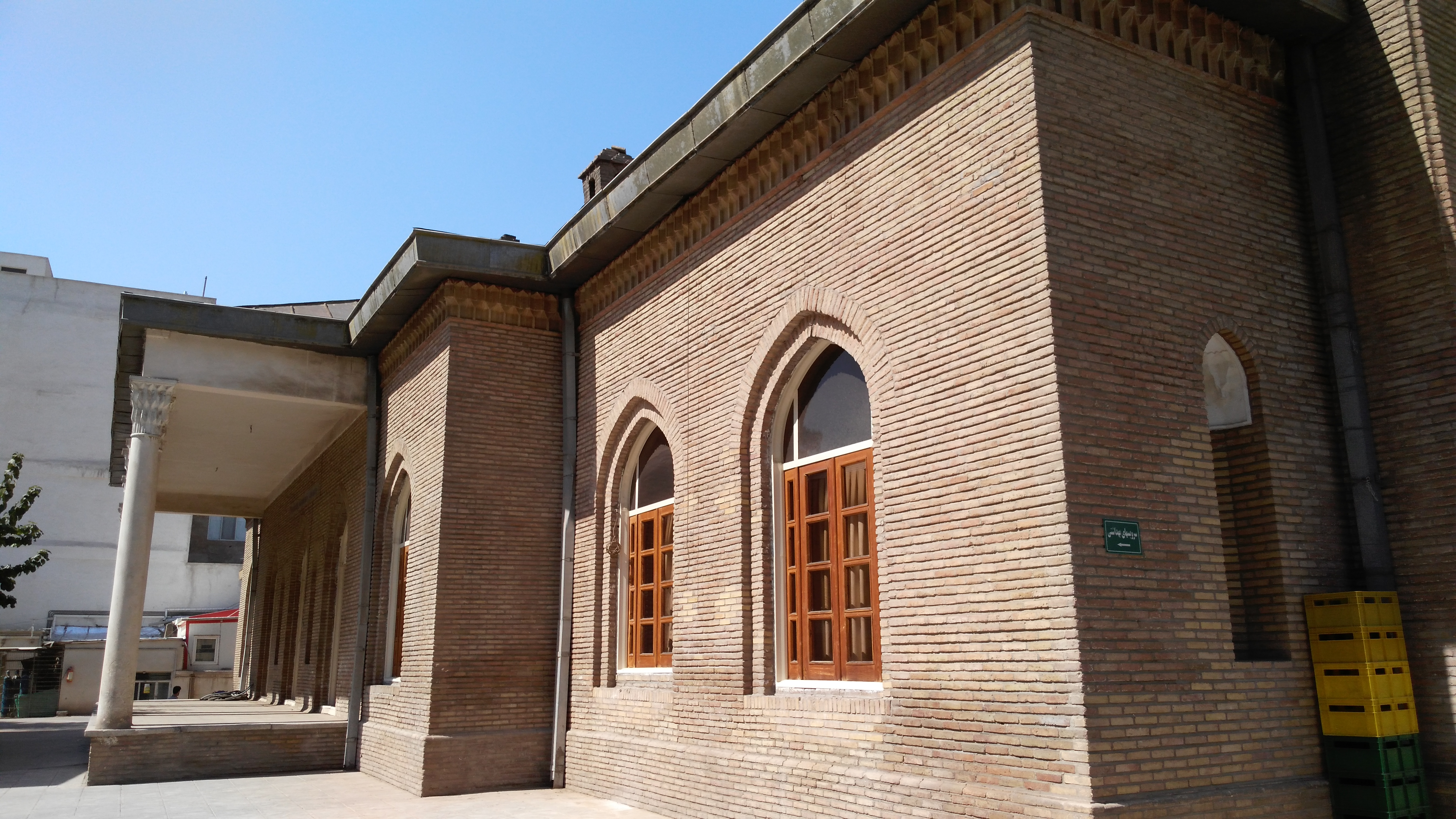

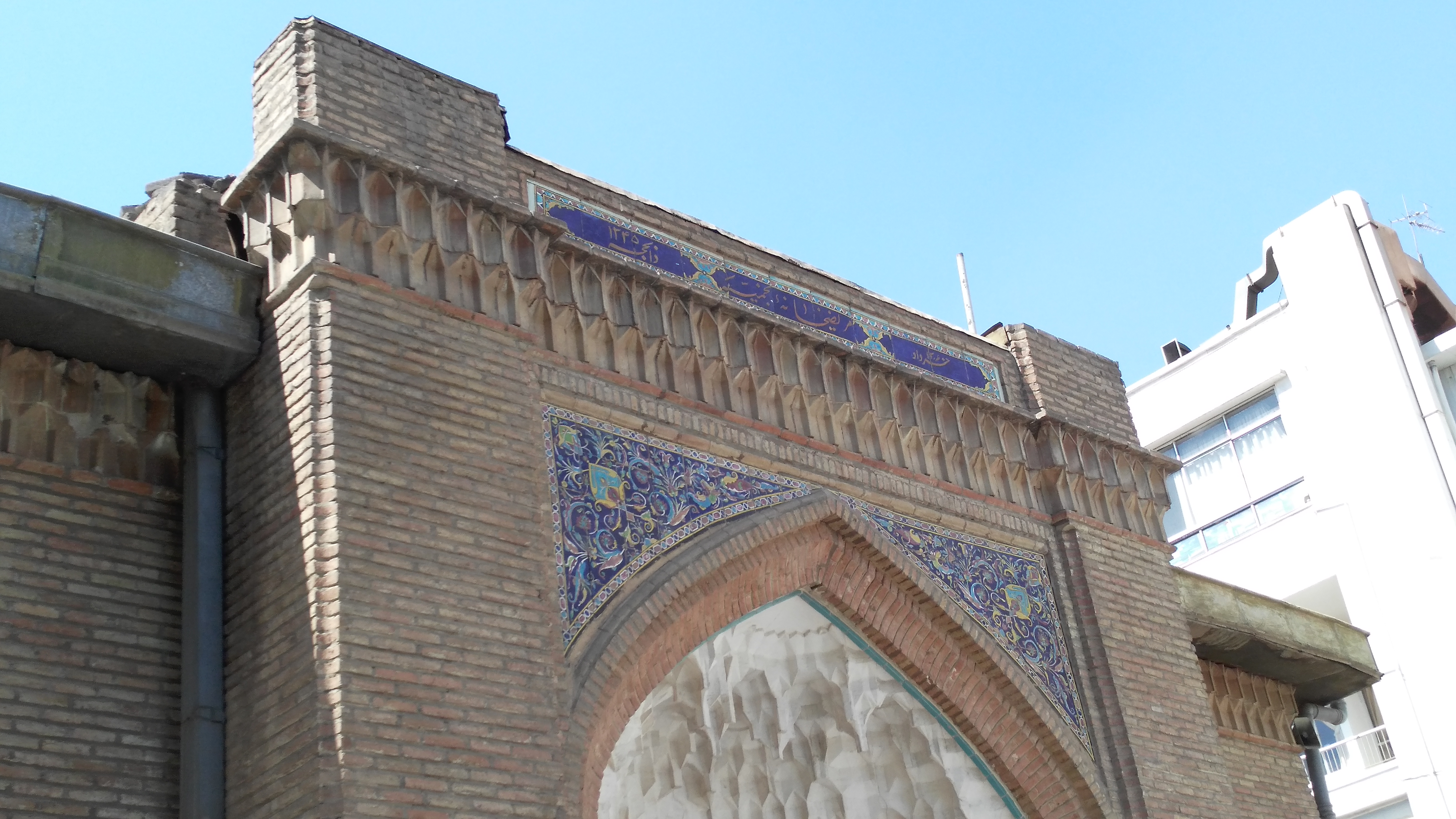

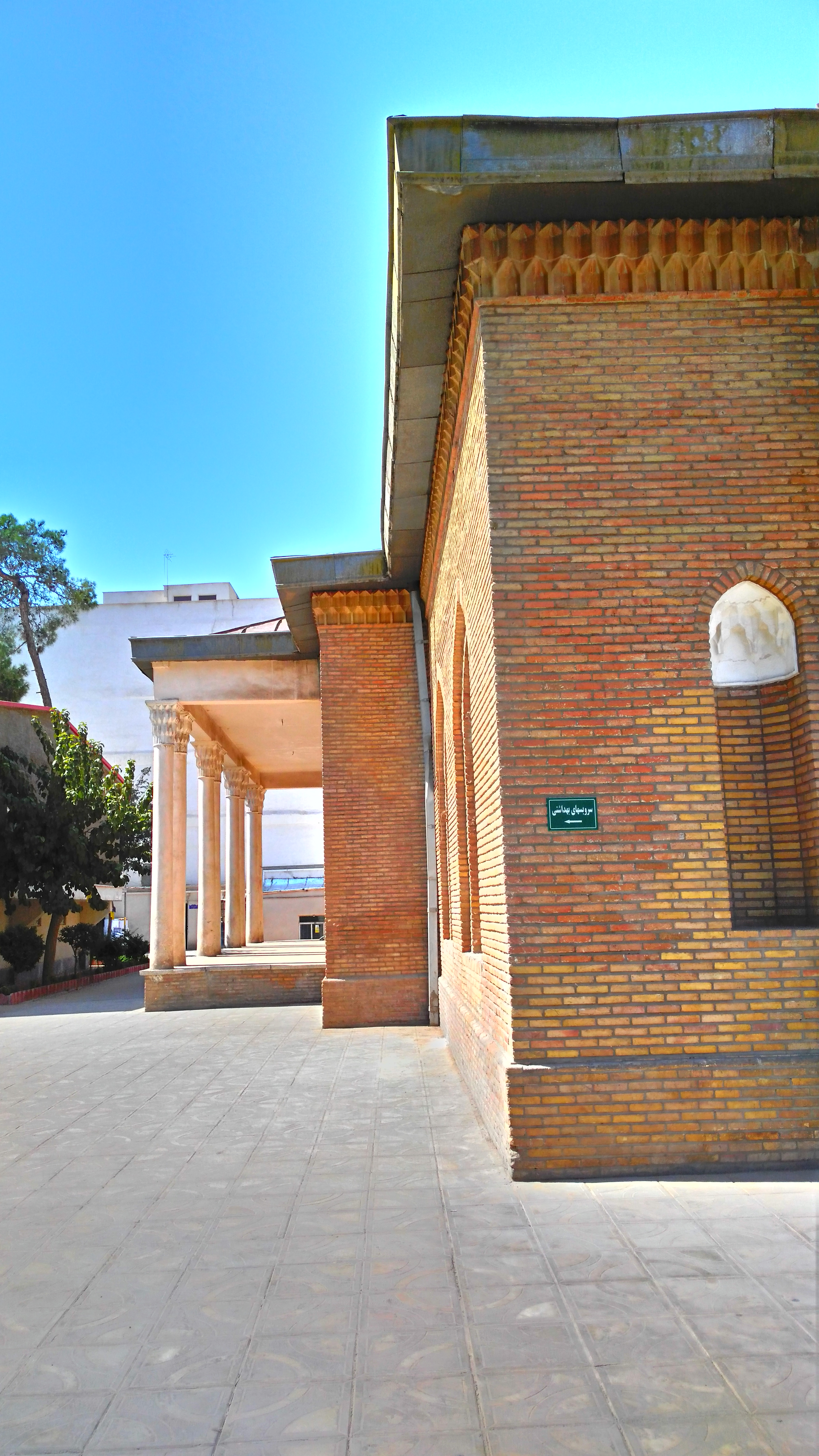

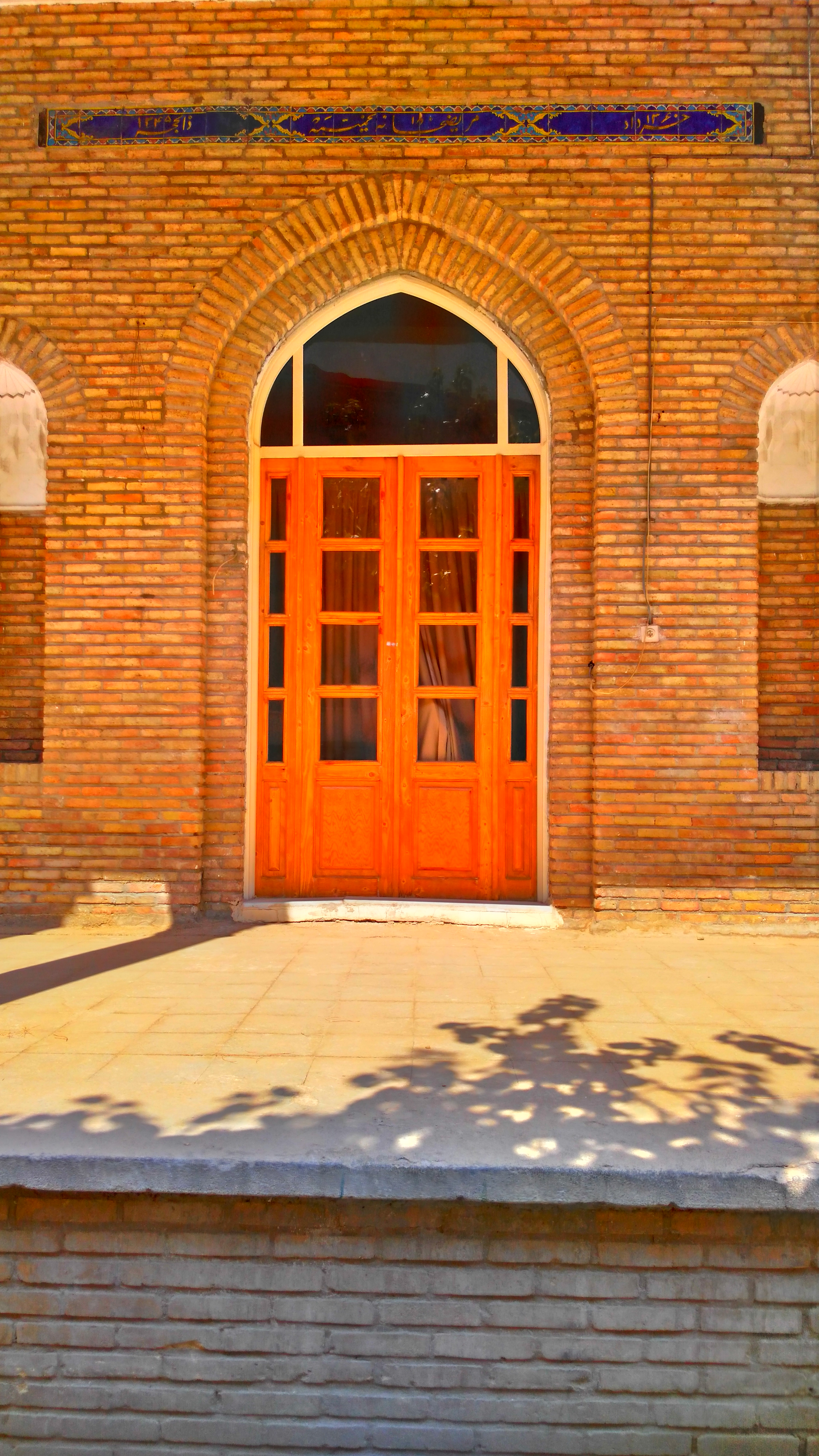
