= Mirza Ahmad Khan Ala od-Dowleh =

Iranian politician and military officer (1866/67–1911)

Mirza Ahmad Khan
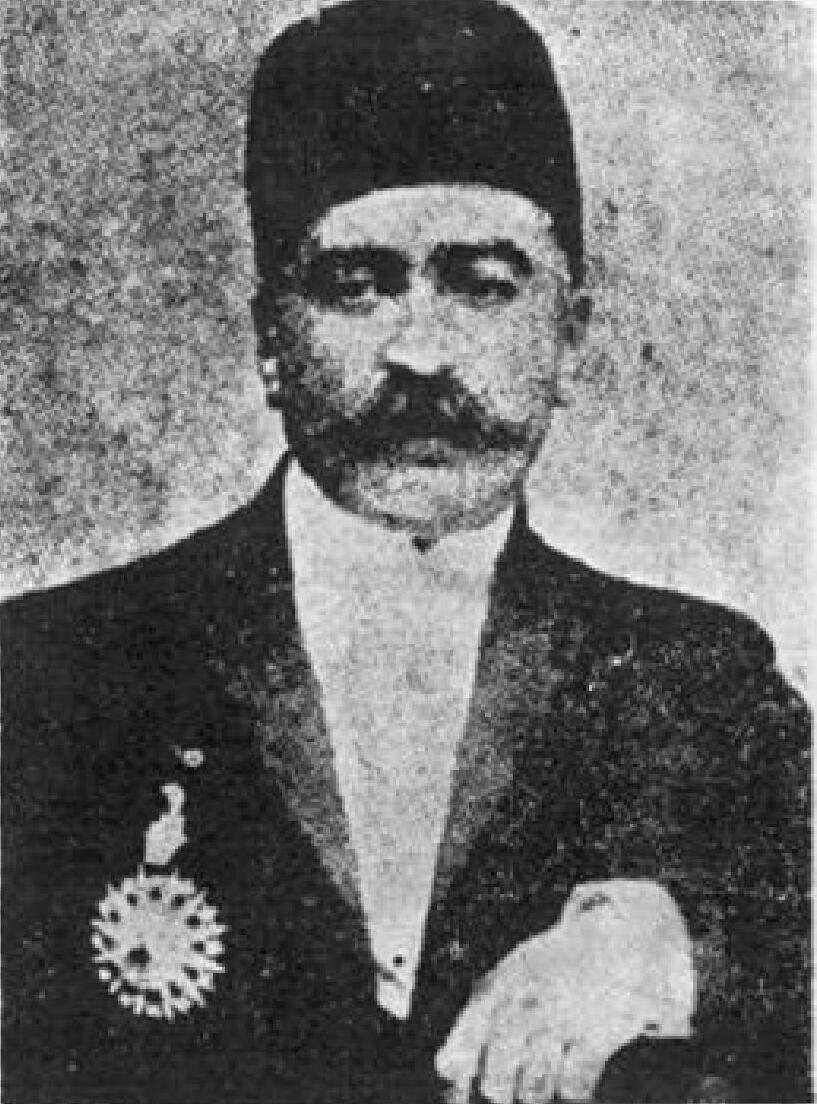

Governor of Fars
- In office 1907
- Monarch: Mozaffar ad-Din Shah

Governor of Fars
- In office 1903
- Monarch: Mozaffar ad-Din Shah

Governor of Tehran
- In office 1905
- Monarch: Mozaffar ad-Din Shah

Governor of Kermanshah
- In office 1902–1903
- Monarch: Mozaffar ad-Din Shah

Governor of Mazandaran
- In office 1901–1902
- Monarch: Mozaffar ad-Din Shah

Governor of Gorgan
- In office 1899–1900
- Monarch: Mozaffar ad-Din Shah

Governor of Khuzestan
- In office 1896–1897
- Monarch: Mozaffar ad-Din Shah

Personal details
- Died: 1 December 1911
- Parent: Mohammad Rahim Khan Ala ad-Dowleh (father)

Military service
- Allegiance: Qajar Iran
- Rank: Brigadier

Mirza Ahmad Khan (Persian: میرزا احمد خان) known by title Ala' od-Dowleh (Persian: علاءالدوله, lit. 'Glory of the State'; 1866/1867? (Note: According to Mehdi Bamdad, Ahmad Khan was born in 1866/1867. But this date is doubtful since he accompanied the Naser al-Din Shah in journey to Europe in 1873.) – 1 December 1911) was Qajar politician and military officer, son of Mohammad Rahim Khan Ala ad-Dowleh.

E'temad os-Saltaneh characterizes him as an ill-mannered and obnoxious man. In 1886, while on a pilgrimage to Iraq, he refused to surrender his rifle to Ottoman border officials. In 1903, while serving as governor of Fars, he was tasked with hosting Lord Curzon, who had arrived in Bushehr aboard a British naval squadron in the Persian Gulf. Because Curzon declined to come ashore, Ala od-Dowleh considered it a sign of weakness to meet him on his ship and refused to board. This incident reportedly resulted in his dismissal from the governorship of Fars.

== Military career ==
In 1881, Mohammad Rahim Khan formed the special Mansur guard unit. Ahmad Khan, who then held the rank of first brigadier (Sartip-e Awwal) and served as a special royal attendant, was appointed as its chief. He later also assumed command of the Mahdiya guards; both units received military training modeled after that of the Cossacks.

== Governorship career ==
After the death of his father, Mohammad Rahim Khan, he received the title Ala od-Dowleh. Under Mozaffar ad-Din Shah, he served as governor of several provinces: Khuzestan (1896–1897), Gorgan (1899–1900), Mazandaran (1901–1902), Kermanshah (1902–1903), and Fars (1903). While serving as governor of Tehran in 1905, sugar prices imported from the Russian Empire rose significantly as a result of the Russo-Japanese War. In an effort to forcibly lower prices, Ala od-Dowleh ordered two Sayyid merchants to be bastinadoed on 12 December 1905.

=== Constitutional revolution ===
This incident served as a catalyst for protests in the Grand Bazaar, helping spark the Constitutional movement; as a result, Ala od-Dowleh was dismissed from his post. In 1907, he was reappointed governor of Fars, but local protests prevented him from taking office. Although Ala od-Dowleh held no personal interest in constitutionalist ideology, he later opposed Mohammad Ali Shah following the establishment of the new government—a stance driven primarily by self-interest and dissatisfaction with conditions at the royal court.

== Conflict with shah and death ==
For his part, Shah threatened him with execution and once had him severely bastinadoed. In 1907, Ala od-Dowleh was arrested and exiled to Firuzkuh alongside Jalal ed-Dowleh (son of Zell-e Soltan) and Fathollah Khan Akbar, though he was soon allowed to return. Later that same year, a bomb was thrown into his home, leaving him viewed with suspicion by both government officials and the constitutionalists. In 1911, after being pressed for unpaid taxes, he openly plotted against William Morgan Shuster, the American financial advisor to the Ministry of Finance. During the unrest surrounding the Russian ultimatum demanding Shuster's dismissal, constitutionalists shot and killed Ala od-Dowleh in front of his home on 1 December 1911.

== Sources ==
- Bamdad, Mehdi (1968). شرح حال رجال ایران در قرن ۱۲ و۱۳ و ۱۴ هجری [Biographies of the Dignitaries of Iran in the 12th, 13th, and 14th Centuries AH] (PDF) (in Persian). Vol. 1. Tehran: Zavvar.
- E'temad os-Saltaneh, Mohammad Hasan Khan (1882). تاریخ منتظم ناصری [The Naseri Chronological History] (in Persian). Vol. 3.
- Ardakani, Hosayn Mahbubi (1984). "ʿALĀʾ-AL-DAWLA, MĪRZĀ AḤMAD KHAN". In Yarshater, Ehsan (ed.). Encyclopædia Iranica (Online ed.). Encyclopædia Iranica Foundation.
- Kasravi, Ahmad (1940). تاریخ مشروطه ایران [History of the Iranian Constitutional Movement] (in Persian). Vol. 3. Tehran: Amir Kabir Publishers.
- E'temad os-Saltaneh, Mohammad-Hasan Khan (1966). Afshar, Iraj (ed.). روزنامه خاطرات اعتمادالسلطنه [The Diary of E'temad os-Saltaneh] (in Persian). Tehran: Amir Kabir Publishers.
