= Moshir od-Dowleh =

Moshir od-Dowleh, also transliterated as Moshir al-Dowleh (Persian: مشیرالدوله), is the title of several Iranian politicians of the Qajar era:

- Jafar Khan Moshir od-Dowleh
- Mirza Yahya Khan Moshir od-Dowleh
- Mirza Hosein Khan Moshir od-Dowleh
- Mirza Mohsen Khan Moshir od-Dowleh
- Mirza Nasrullah Khan Naini
- Hassan Pirnia
