= Fakhr-ol-Dowleh =

Iranian princess (1883–1955)

Fakhr-ol-dowleh
- Princess Ashraf al-Muluk
- Born: 1883; Tabriz, Sublime State of Iran
- Died: December 1955 (aged 71–72); Tehran, Imperial State of Iran
- Spouse: Mohsen Amin-ol-dowleh
- Issue: Hossein Amini; Gholamhossein Amini; Mahmoud Amini; Ali Amini; Mohammad Amini; Ahmad Amini; Abul-Qasem Amini; Reza Amini; Masoumeh Amini
- Dynasty: Qajar
- Father: Mozaffar al-Din Shah Qajar
- Mother: Sarvar al-Saltaneh

Princess Ashraf al-Muluk (Persian: اشرف‌الملوک; 1883–December 1955), titled Fakhr-ol-Dowleh (فخرالدوله), was one of the most prominent and influential Mozaffar ad-Din Shah of the Qajar dynasty. Known for her strong and resolute character, she was willing and able to confront even Reza Shah to defend her patrimony and rights. The daughter of Mozaffar al-Din Shah and Sarvar al-Saltaneh, she was also the sister of Abdol-Hossein Farman Farma, a cousin of Mohammad Mosaddegh, and the mother of Ali Amini. Beyond her royal lineage, she played a crucial role as an intermediary between Reza Shah Pahlavi and the Qajar dynasty, with her efforts being instrumental in maintaining peace and preventing bloodshed during a period of significant political transition.

At the age of fourteen, Fakhr-ol-Dowleh was married to Prince Mohsen, Amin-ol-Molk junior. His father, Mirza Ali Khan Amin ol-Molk, was a prominent prime minister under the Qajars who was often condemned for acting indecisively towards foreign powers, specifically Britain. This marriage was preceded by a complex series of events, as her cousin, Mohammad Mosaddegh, had also sought to marry her. However, the Shah preferred a more powerful political alliance for his daughter. This decision led to a chain reaction of rivalries and resentment, as Fakhr-ol-Dowleh's future husband was compelled to divorce his former fiancée—the daughter of another powerful figure, Moshir-ol-Dowleh to clear the way for the royal marriage. This action created lasting animosity between the two families.

Fakhr-ol-Dowleh's shrewdness and loyalty were demonstrated early in her marriage. When her father-in-law was dismissed from his chancellorship, she feared he and her husband would face a similar fate to other deposed Qajar prime ministers, who were often exiled or assassinated. Defying a direct royal order, she secretly traveled to Qazvin to join them. Despite repeated demands from the court for her return, she refused to leave their side. Her persistence and courage ultimately forced the court to relent, and she accompanied her family to Rasht, where they were to be exiled, thereby protecting them from imminent danger.

Following the death of her father-in-law, Fakhr-ol-Dowleh's husband withdrew from political life, disillusioned by the political turmoil of the Constitutional Revolution and the conflicts with the Jangal Movement. Witnessing his disengagement, Fakhr-ol-Dowleh took it upon herself to manage the family's affairs. She took control of her husband's huge wealth, together with her own inheritance, and managed to make his family the most financially powerful in the country. A savvy negotiator, she later met with Sardar Sepah (Reza Shah) and successfully reclaimed the family's lands. Most of the district of Elahieh in Tehran belonged to her, and she dedicated her efforts to developing these properties, significantly increasing their value.

Beyond her role as a formidable matriarch and landowner, Fakhr-ol-Dowleh was a pioneering entrepreneur and a dedicated philanthropist. She is credited with establishing Tehran's first taxi company, a groundbreaking venture at the time, introducing white Fiats that slowly replaced old horse carriages during the 1950s. She also attempted to found a national stock exchange in Iran, though the project was ultimately unsuccessful due to unfavorable conditions. Her charitable work was extensive; she became the guardian of 28 orphans, providing them with education and care throughout their lives.

== Final years ==
In her final years, Fakhr-ol-Dowleh was deeply affected by the loss of her son, Hossein Amini. She spent most of her time in her garden in Elahiyeh, largely withdrawing from social life. She died from a heart attack in December 1955 at the age of seventy-two. Though she had previously purchased a burial plot in Najaf, she requested to be buried next to her son in Ibn Babuyeh Cemetery in Rey. Her son, Ali Amini, briefly became the Prime Minister of Iran under Mohammad Reza Shah. Following the Iranian Revolution of 1979, he led an opposition movement against the Islamic Republic in Paris. Her legacy endures as a powerful and influential woman who skillfully navigated political strife, demonstrated remarkable business acumen, and dedicated her life to her family and community.

== See also ==
- Fakhr-ol-dowleh Mosque
- Mozaffar ad-Din Shah Qajar
- Ali Amini
