= Samad Khan Momtaz os-Saltaneh =

Iranian prince and diplomat (1869–1954)

Prince Samad Khan Momtaz os-Saltaneh
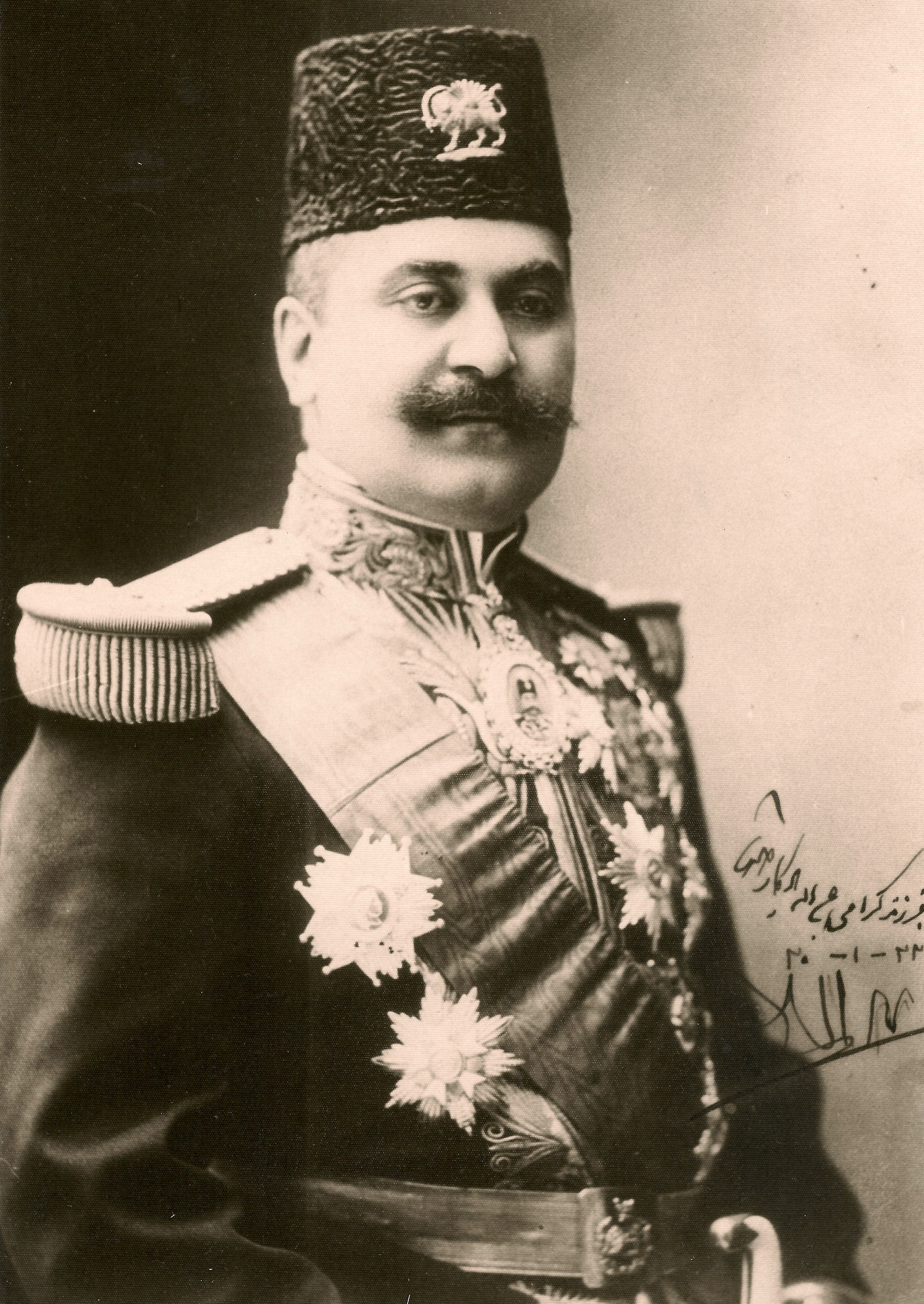

Extraordinary and Plenipotentiary Minister in Paris
- In office April 1905 – March 1906
- Appointed by: Mozaffar ad-Din Shah Qajar

Ambassador of Iran to France
- In office 5 March 1946 – 27 September 1951

Personal details
- Born: 1869 Tabriz, Qajar Iran
- Died: March 1954 (aged 84–85) Paris, France

Samad Khan Momtaz os-Saltaneh (Persian: صمد خان ممتاز السطنه; 1869–26 March 1954) was an Iranian prince and diplomat of the Qajar and Pahlavi eras.

== Early life ==
Samad Khan Momtaz was born in 1869 in Tabriz. His father was Ali Akbar Mokrem os-Saltaneh (میرزا علی اکبر مکرم‌ السلطنه), grandson of Samad Khan Sarraf (آقا صمد صراف تبریزی) and his brothers were Momtaz Homayoun and Esmail Momtaz od-Dowleh, His father was an eminent aristocrat and diplomat.

== Career ==
In 1883, Samad Khan Momtaz os-Saltaneh was secretary to the legation of Persia in Paris. Later, he was embassy counsellor in St. Petersburg and participated in the European travels of Naser al-Din Shah Qajar and then Mozaffar ad-Din Shah Qajar. He was the Persian minister in Belgium and the Netherlands before being appointed Extraordinary and Plenipotentiary Minister in Paris in April 1905. He remained at this position until March 1926. He never returned to Iran and chose to live in Paris. He was recognized by the French government as counsellor of the Iranian embassy in Paris from 25 March 1946 to 27 September 1951. Samad Khan Momtaz os-saltaneh, was the second Persian IOC (International Olympic Committee) Member. His date of appointment was November 1923, and he remained a member until 22 April 1927, after the coronation of Reza Shah Pahlavi. At the conference of the International Red Cross of 1906, Momtaz os-Saltaneh convinced the assembly to accept the use of new emblems; The Red Lion and Sun for Persia (not used since the 1979 Islamic revolution) and the Red Crescent for the rest of Islamic states.

== Personal life ==
His first marriage, to an Iranian, resulted in a son, Abdollah, who would later become a diplomat in Iran. He had two daughters from a second marriage to a Frenchwoman. He died in 1954 in Paris and was buried at Père-Lachaise cemetery. In March 1921, Samad Khan was elevated to Prince by Ahmad Shah Qajar with the title of Royal Highness. He was a Grand Officier de la Légion d'honneur.

== Photos ==
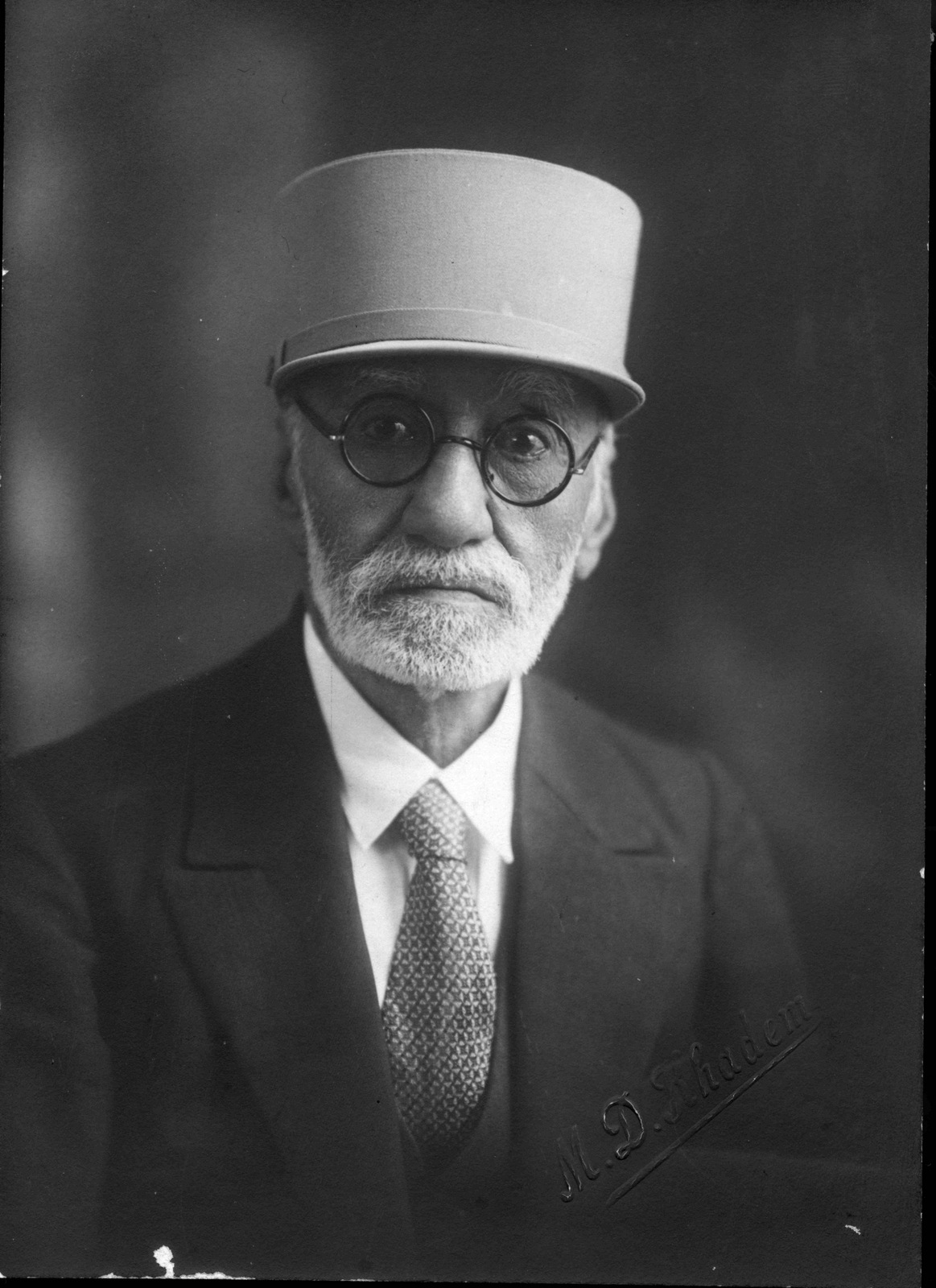
Mokrem os-Saltaneh (his father)

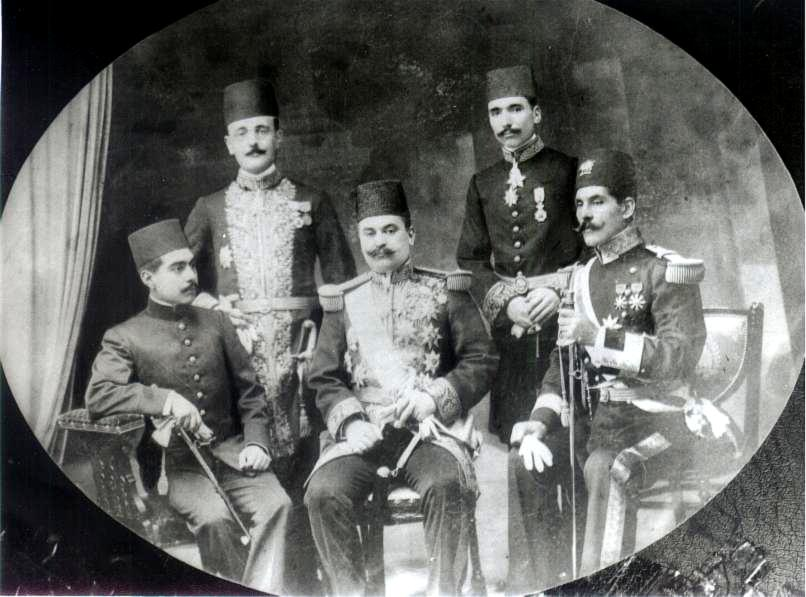
Persian delegation at the funeral of King Edward VII 1910

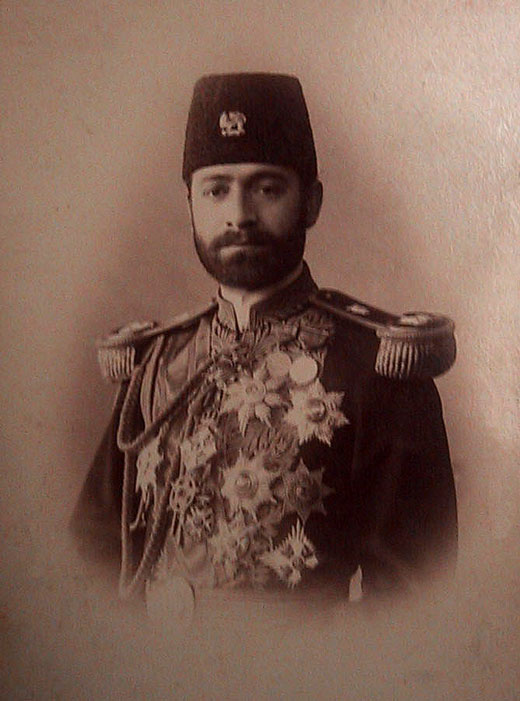
Esmail Momtaz od-Dowleh (his brother)

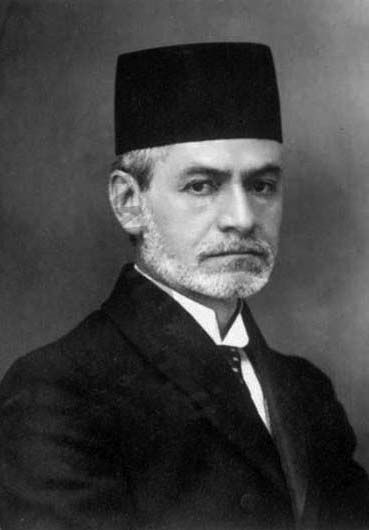
Esmail Momtaz od-Dowleh (his brother)

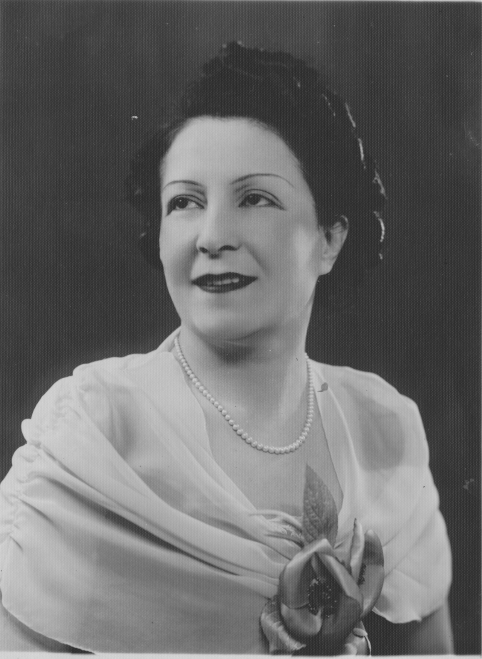
Momtaz ol-Molouk (Married General Naghdi)(his sister)

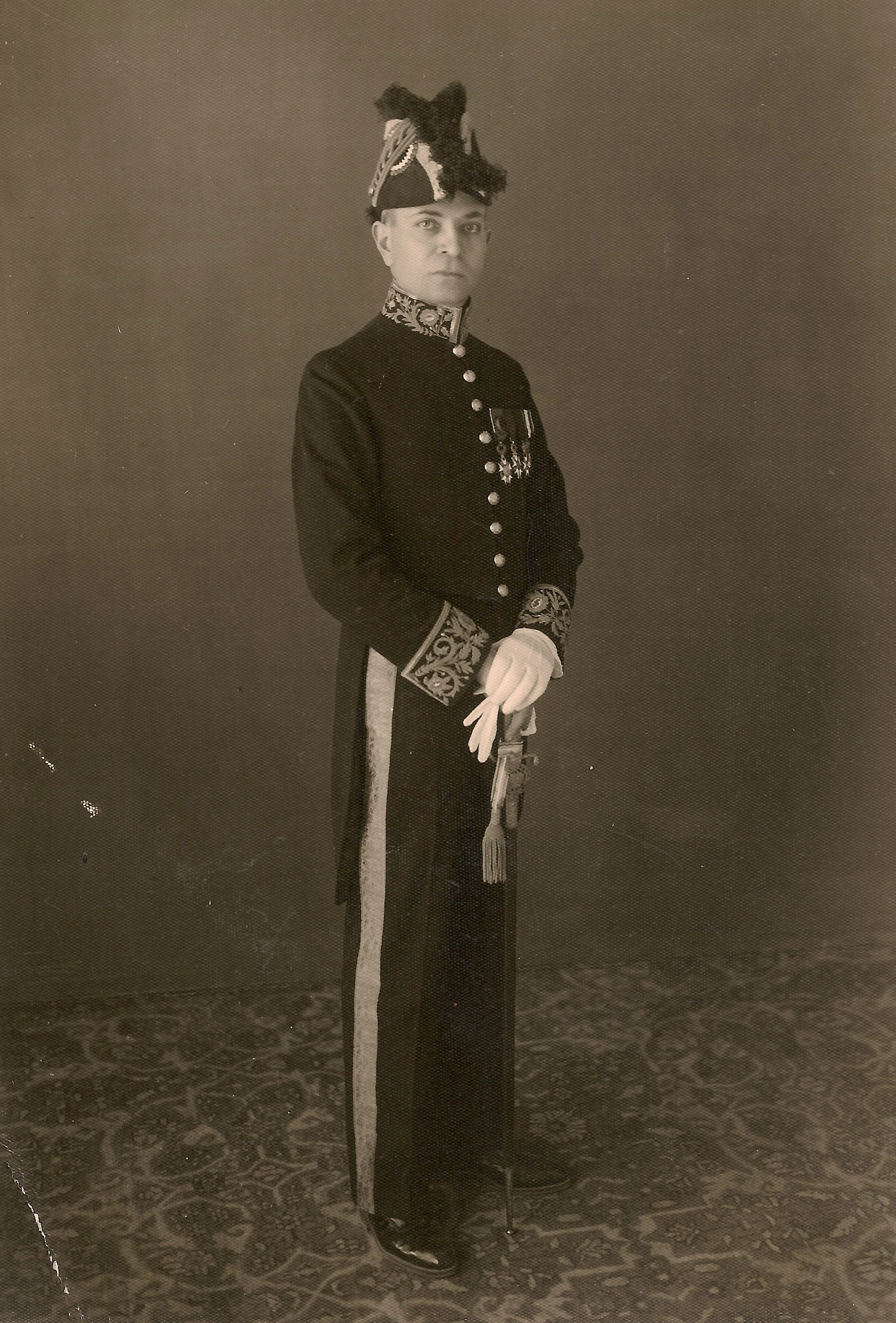
Abdollah Khan Momtaz (his son)

Red-Lion And Sun

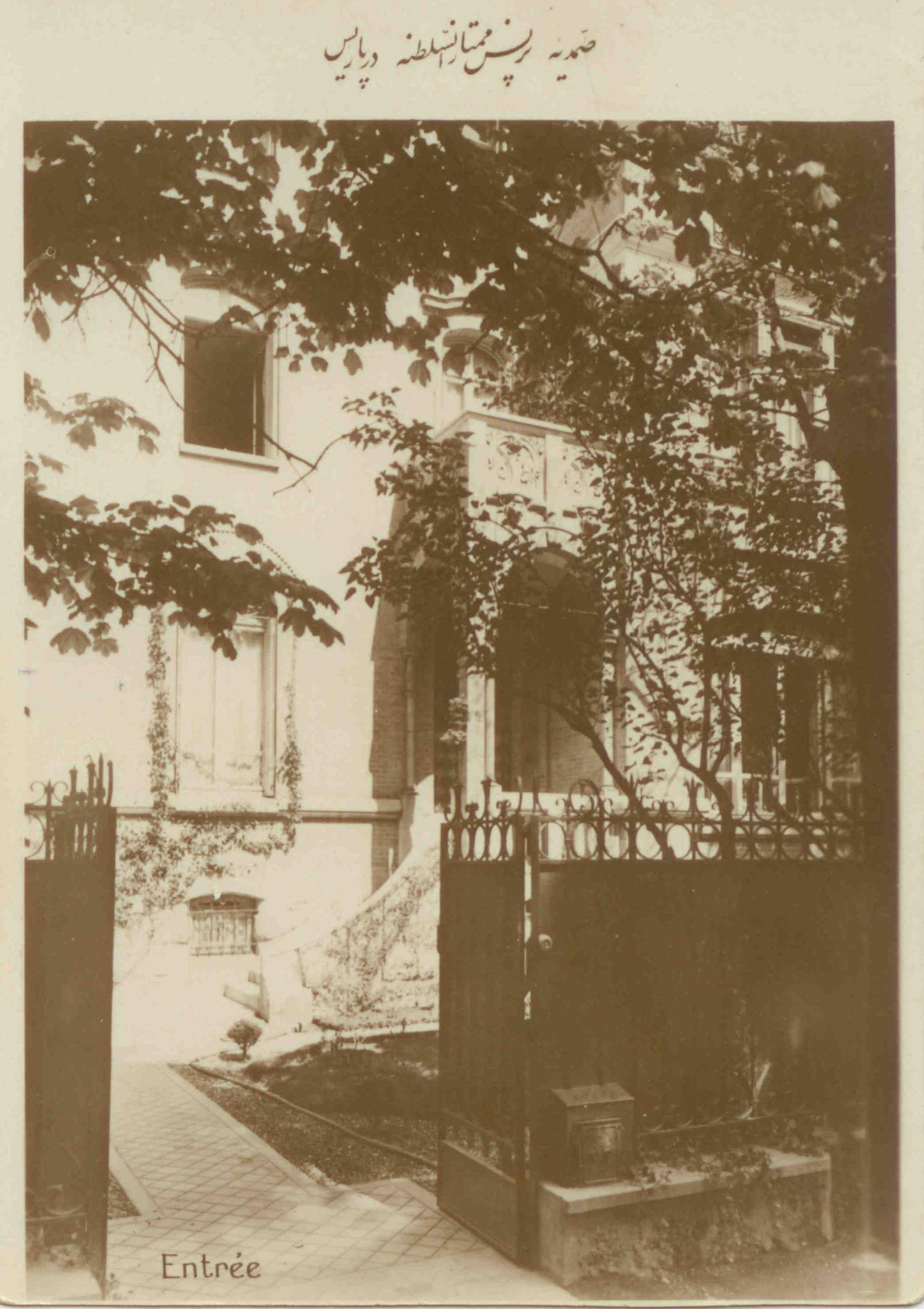
Entrée de sa maison parisienne

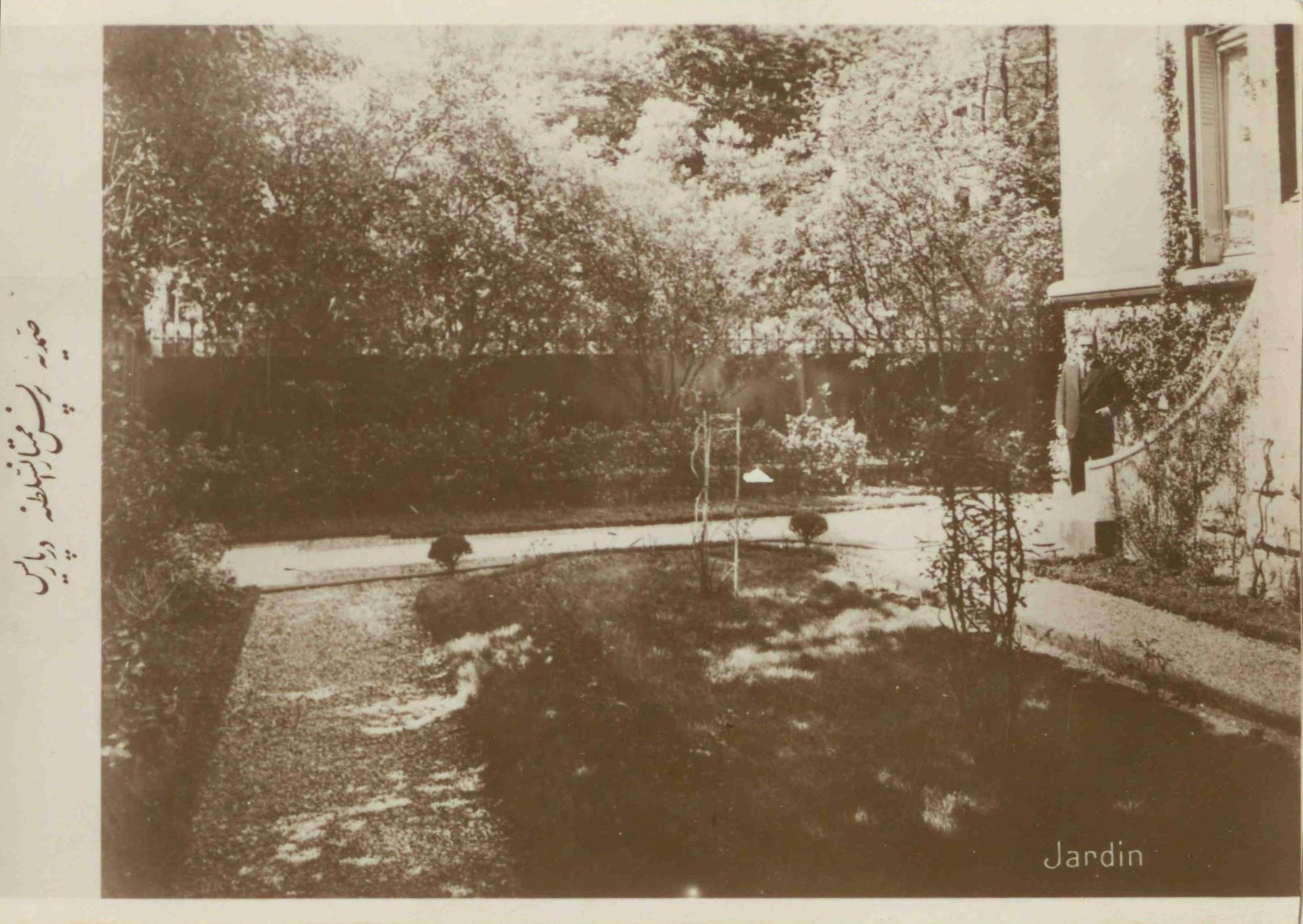
Le jardin de sa maison parisienne

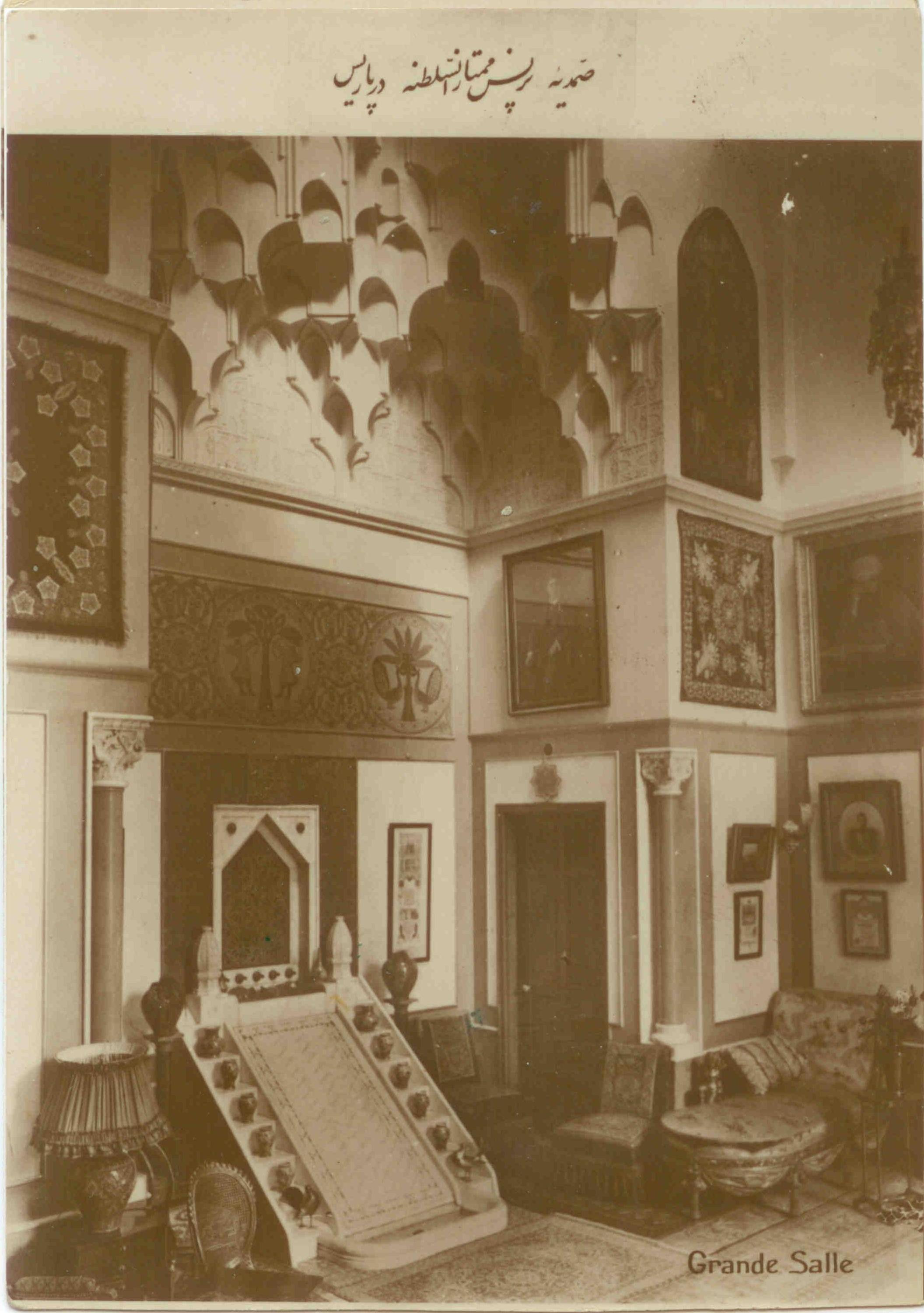
La Grande Salle

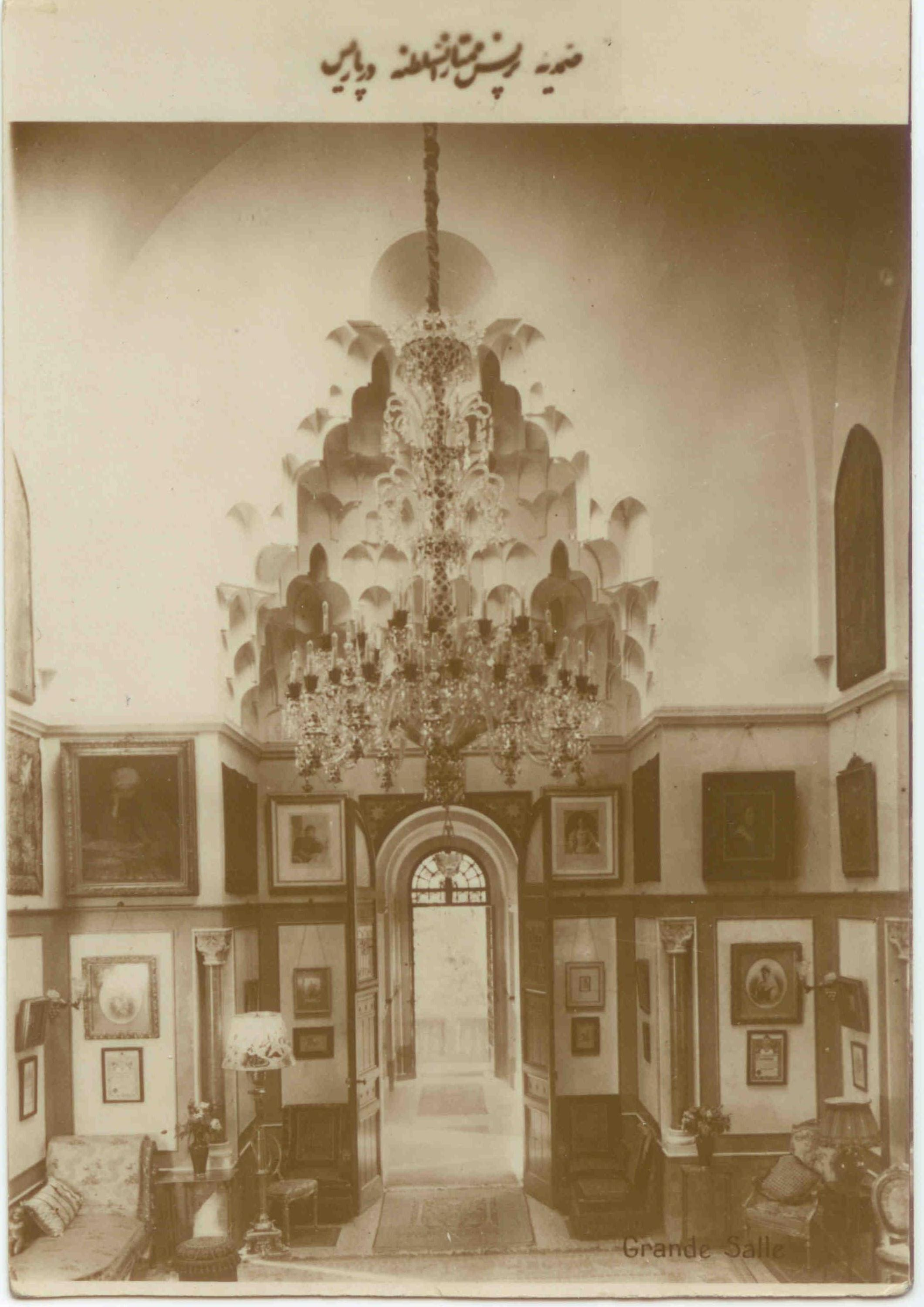
La Grande Salle

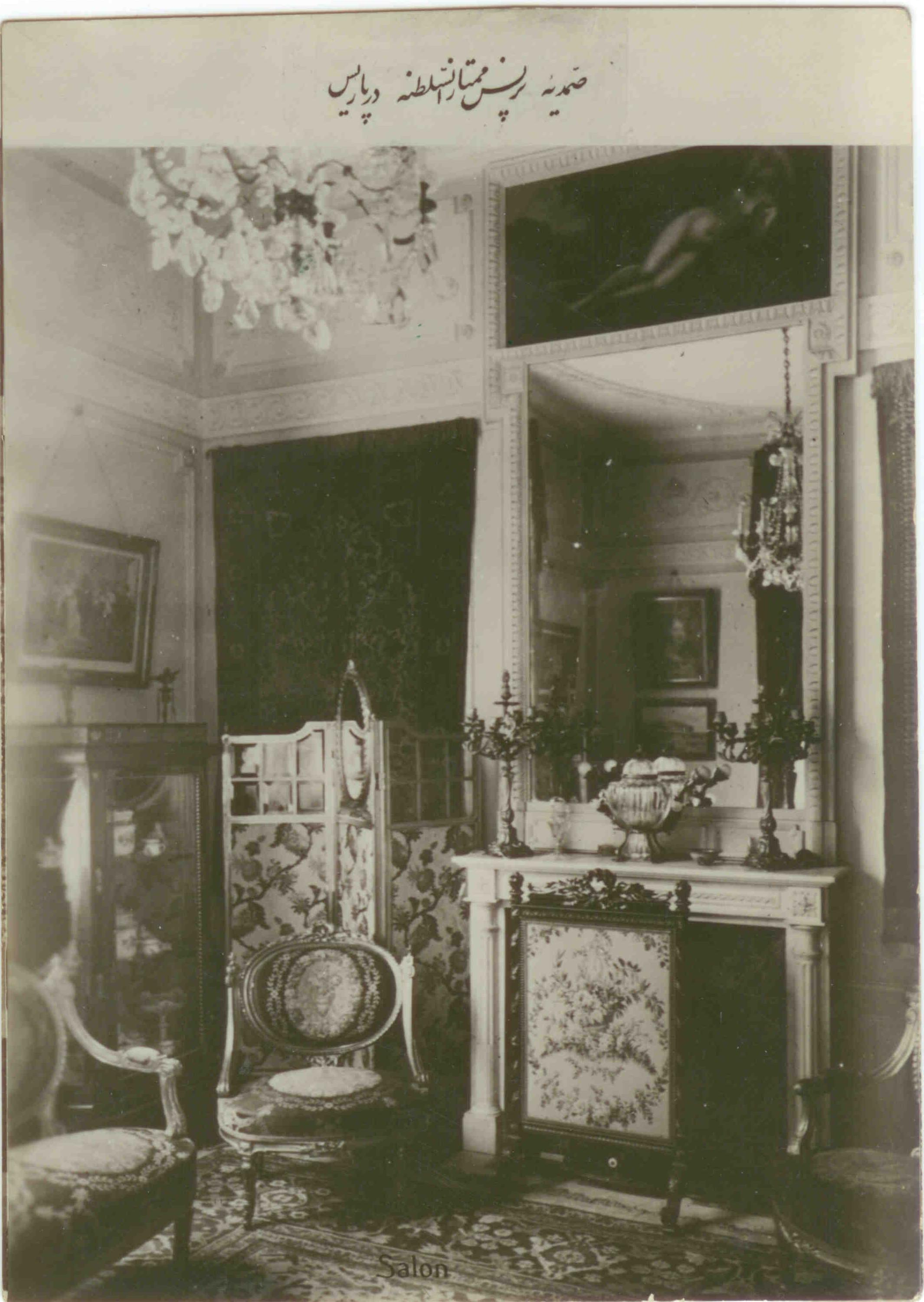
Le Salon

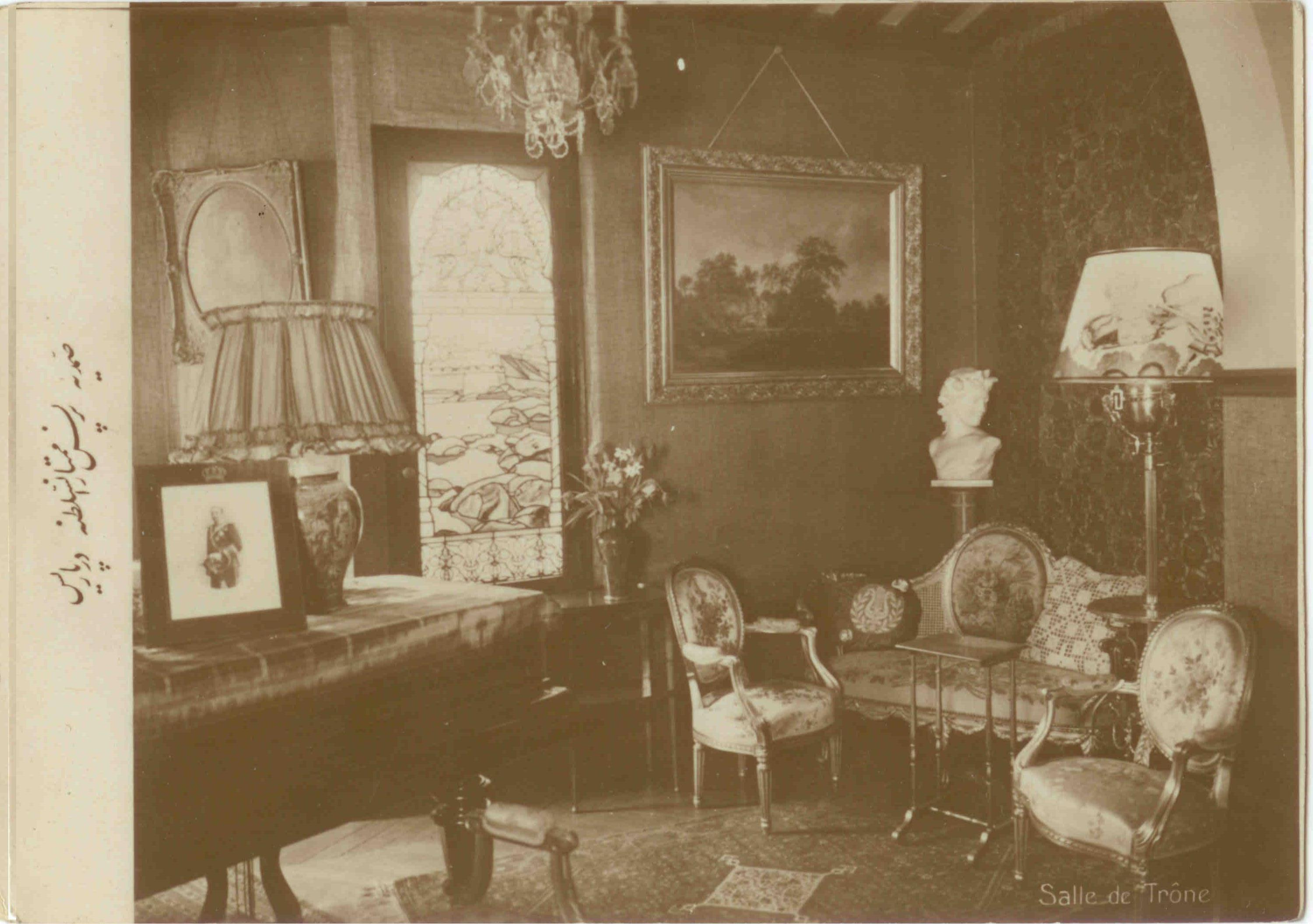
La Salle du Trône

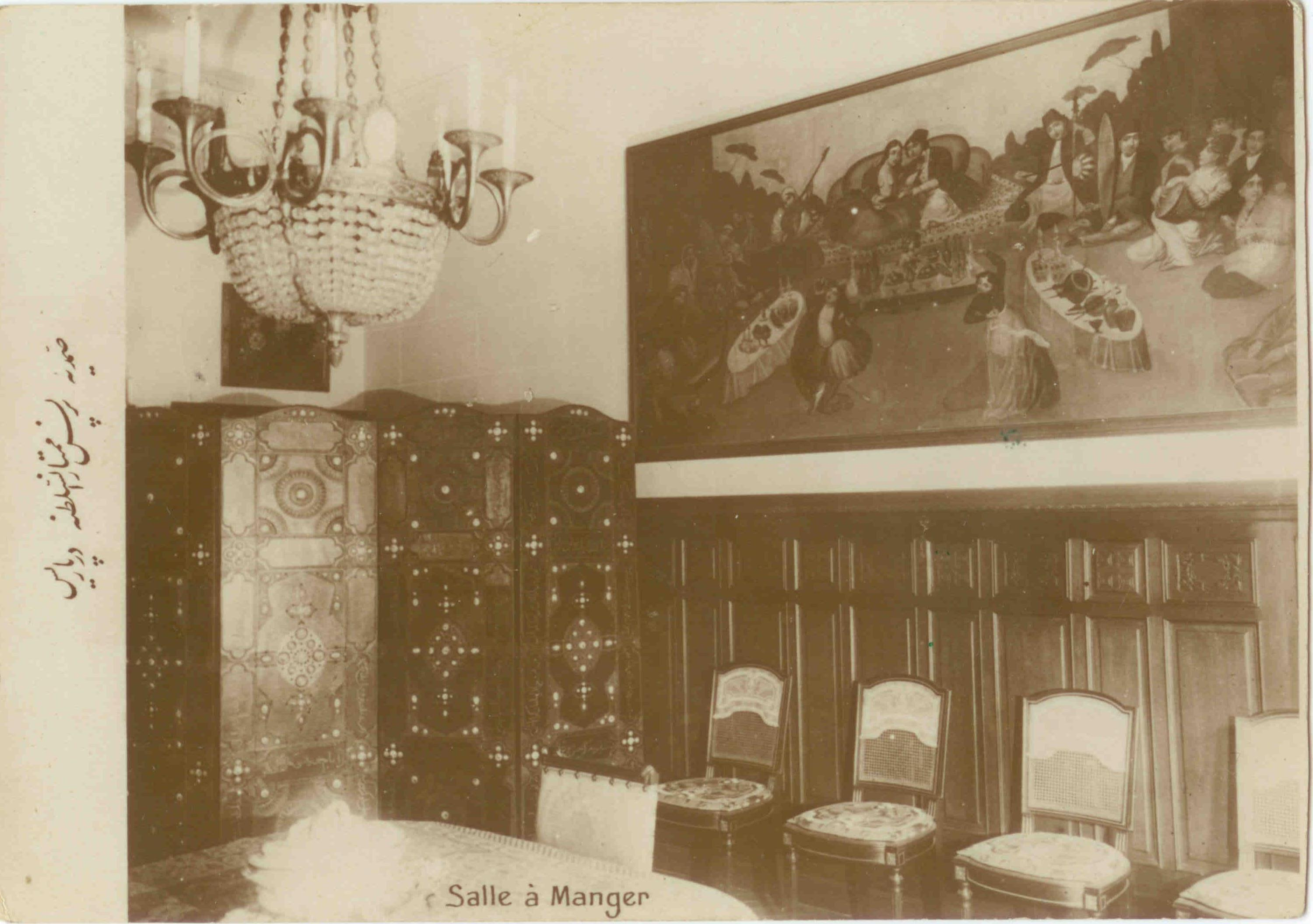
La Salle à Manger

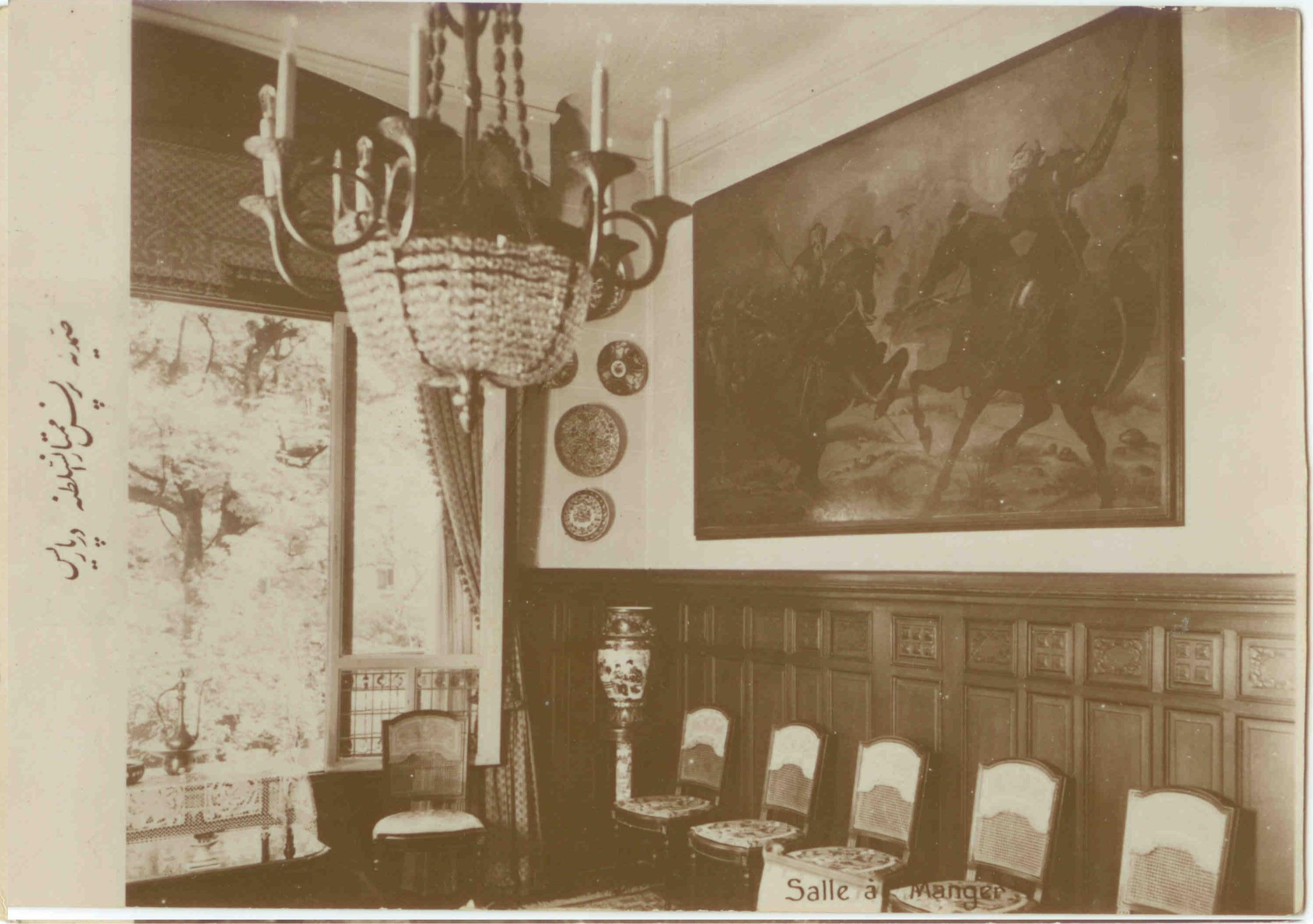
La Salle à Manger

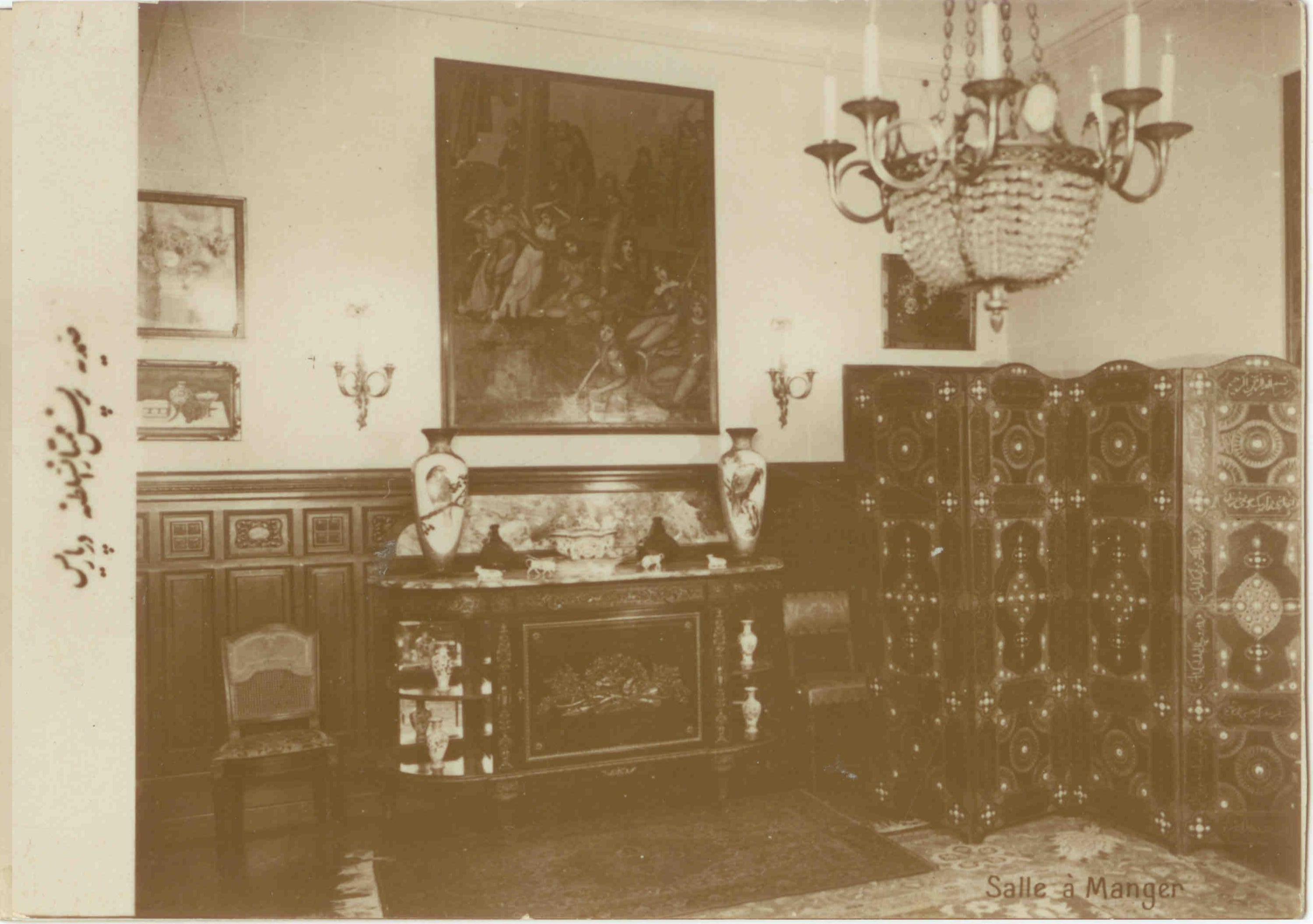
La Salle à Manger
