= Mohammad Rahim Khan Ala ad-Dowleh =

Iranian official (d. 1882)

Amir Nezam Mohammad Rahim Khan
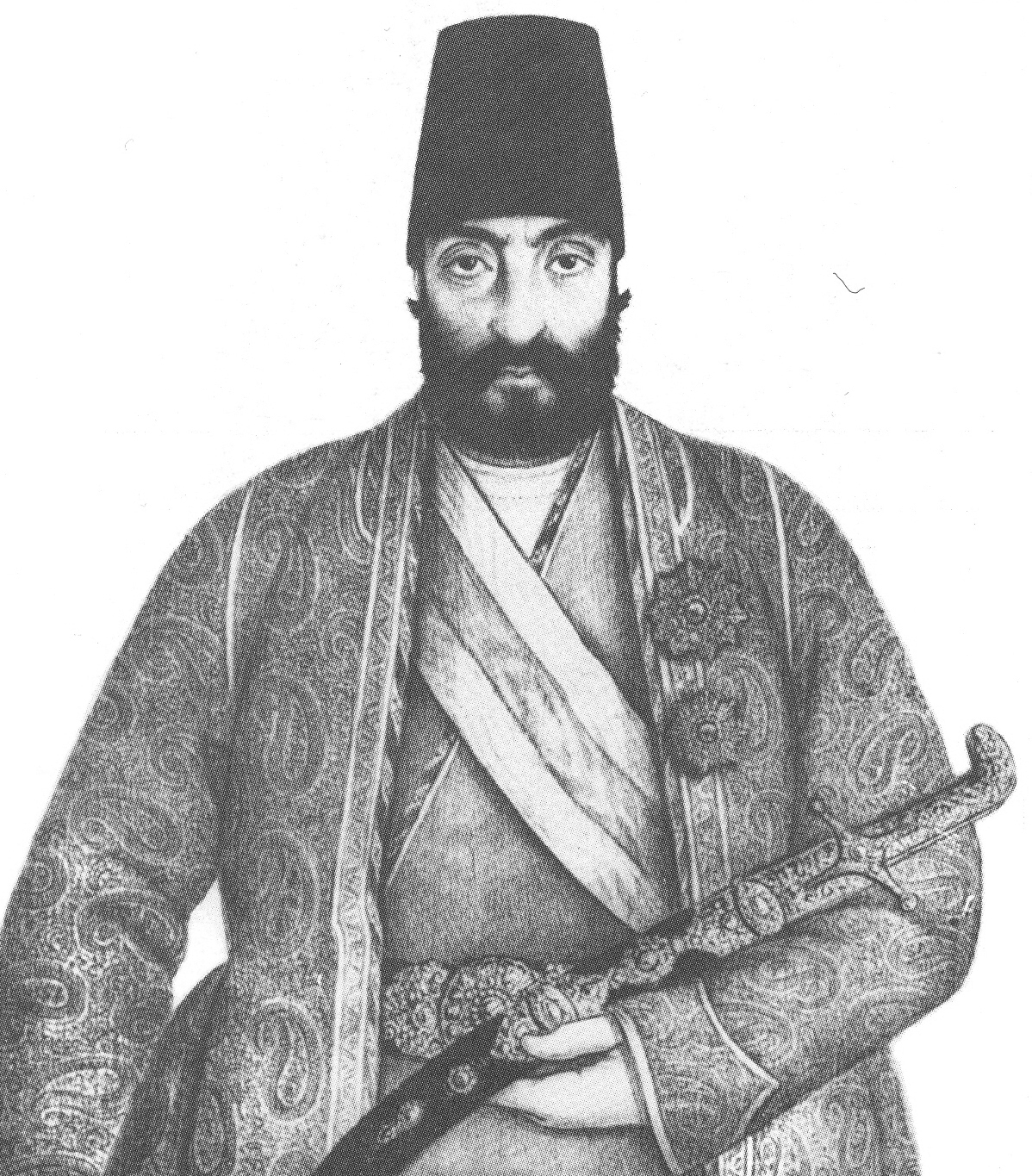
- Illustration of Mohammad Rahim Khan Ala ad-Dowleh by Abu'l-Hasan Sani al-Mulk

Minister of Court
- In office 1875–1881
- Monarch: Naser al-Din Shah Qajar
- Preceded by: Mohammad Naser Khan Zahir od-Dowleh
- Succeeded by: Agha Ebrahim Amin os-Soltan

Minister of War
- In office 1874
- Monarch: Naser al-Din Shah Qajar
- Preceded by: Firuz Mirza
- Succeeded by: Mirza Hosein Khan Sepahsalar

Personal details
- Died: 1882
- Children: Mirza Ahmad Khan Ala od-Dowleh

Mohammad Rahim Khan Ala ad-Dowleh (Persian: محمدرحیم خان علاءالدوله; died 1882) was a Qajar era Iranian official from the Qajar tribe, who occupied high-ranking posts under Naser al-Din Shah Qajar (r. 1848–1896).

One of the most prominent editions of the Persian poem Masnavi by Rumi was financed by Ala ad-Dowleh. It had a dictionary included, and was produced in 1882 under Mirza Taher Basir-al-molk Shaybani's supervision.

== Sources ==
- Ardakani, H. Mahbubi (1984). "ʿAlāʾ-al-dawla". In Yarshater, Ehsan (ed.). Encyclopædia Iranica. Vol. I/7: Ahriman–Alafrank. London and New York: Routledge & Kegan Paul. pp. 770–771. ISBN 978-0-71009-096-6.
