= Ezzat ed-Dowleh =

Iranian princess

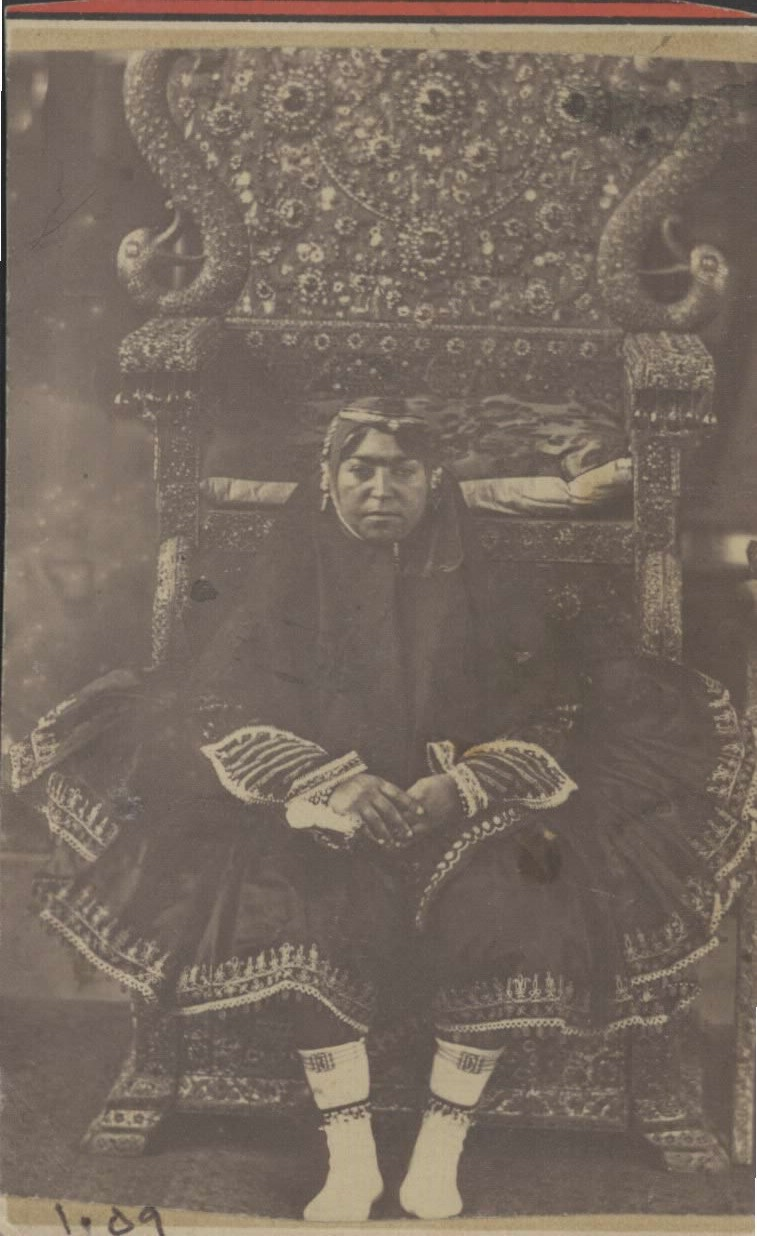
- Ezzat ed-Dowleh on the step of the Naderi Throne
- Born: 1834/35; Tabriz, Qajar Iran
- Died: 1905 (aged 70–71); Isfahan, Qajar Iran
- Burial: Imamzadeh Ahmad, Isfahan
- Spouse: Amir Kabir (m. 1849; dead 1852) Mirza Kazem Nezam-ol-Molk (m. 1852; div. 1859) Anoushirvan Khan Eyn ol-Molk (m. 1860; dead 1866) Mirza Yahya Khan Moshir od-Dowleh (m. 1868; dead 1892)
- Issue: Taj ol-Molouk; Hamdam al-Molouk
Names
- Nawab Aliyeh Maleknesa Khanom Ezzat al-Dowleh
- Dynasty: Qajar
- Father: Mohammad Shah Qajar
- Mother: Malek Jahan Khanom
- Religion: Shia Islam

Maleknesa Khanom (Persian: ملک‌نسا خانم), also known as Ezzat ed-Dowleh (عزت‌الدوله) or Malekzadeh Khanom (ملک‌زاده خانم) (1834/35 – 27 June 1905), was the daughter of Mohammad Shah Qajar and Malek Jahan Khanom Amirsoleimani, and a sister of Naser al-Din Shah Qajar. Ezzat ed-Dowleh married four times in her life time.

== Biography ==
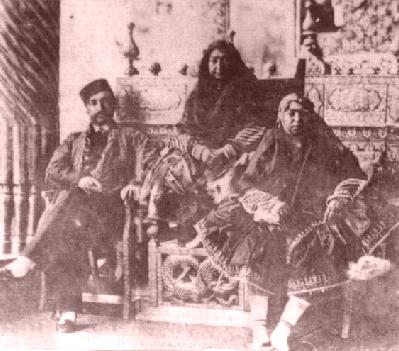
Ezzat ed-Dowleh (right), Malek Jahan Khanom on the steps of the Sun Throne (middle), Naser al-Din Shah Qajar (her brother, the fourth shah of the Qajar dynasty, left). The photo is taken before 1873.

Ezzat ed-Dowleh was born in Kahnamu near Tabriz, north western Iran. Ezzat ed-Dowleh was married four times. The first time when she married Mirza Taghi Khan Farahani in 1849. The marriage ended after Amir Kabir was murdered on 10 January 1852. The second time she married Mirza Kazem Nezam-ol-Molk Son of Mirza Aqa Khan Nuri. The marriage lasted seven years, until Ezzat ed-Dowleh divorced her husband and married for the third time with her cousin Anoushirvan Khan Qajar. After Anoushirvan Khan Qajar had died in 1868, Ezzat ed-Dowleh married for the fourth time with Mirza Yahya Khan Moshir od-Dowleh in 1868. Ezzat ed-Dowleh died on 27 June 1905 and was buried in Isfahan.

== Children ==
Ezzat ed-Dowleh had two daughters by her first husband Amir Kabir: Taj ol-Molouk, a future consort of Mozaffar ad-Din Shah Qajar, and Hamdam al-Molouk.
