= Mirza Yahya Khan Moshir od-Dowleh =

Iranian politician

Mirza Yahya Khan Qazvini Moshir od-Dowleh
- میرزا یحیی‌ خان قزوینی
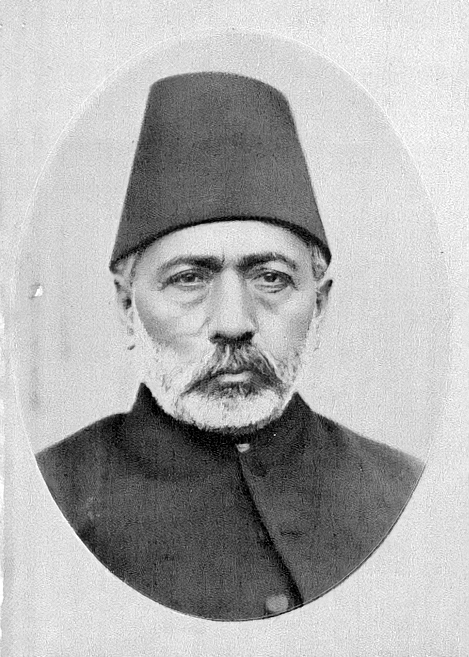

Minister of Foreign Affairs
- In office 5 February 1886 – 1 August 1887
- Monarch: Naser al-Din Shah Qajar
- Preceded by: Mirza Mahmoud Khan Naser al Molk
- Succeeded by: Mirza Abbas Khan Qavam od-Dowleh

Personal details
- Born: 1832 Qazvin, Qajar Iran
- Died: 20 January 1892 (aged 59–60) Tehran, Qajar Iran
- Resting place: Mashhad
- Spouse: Ezzat ed-Dowleh (m. 1868)
- Parent: Mirza Nabi Khan Amir od-Dowleh (father)

Mirza Yahya Khan Moshir od-Dowleh Qazvini (Persian: میرزا یحیی‌خان مشیرالدوله قزوینی; 1832 – 20 January 1892), was an Iranian politician and minister during the Qajar era. He was the fourth husband to a sister of Naser al-Din Shah Qajar, Ezzat ed-Dowleh.

== Early life ==
Moshir od-Dowleh was born in 1832 in Qazvin. He was the son of Mirza Nabi Khan Amir od-Dowleh, who served as Governor of Fares and Isfahan. Moshir od-Dowleh finished his higher education in Paris, France. He was married to the Shah's sister Ezzat od-Dowleh, in 1868. Moshir od-Dowleh was foreign minister from 5 February 1886 to 1 August 1887 and was Justice Minister from 1888 until 1891. Mirza Yahya Khan Moshir od-Dowleh died in Tehran and was buried in Mashhed in 1892.

Political offices
Preceded by Mirza Mahmoud Khan Naser al Molk	Minister of Foreign Affairs; 1886-1887	Succeeded by Mirza Abbas Khan Qavam od-Dowleh
