= Taj ol-Molouk =

Iranian royal consort (1848/49 – 1909)

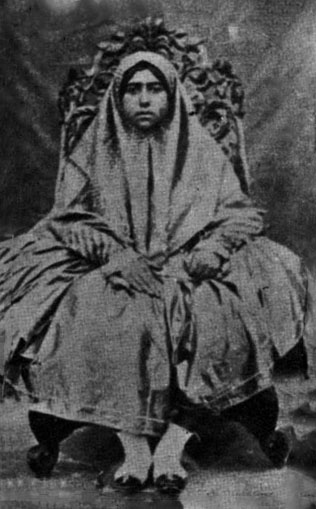
- Taj ol-Molouk in her youth

Senior consort of the Qajar shah
- Tenure: 1 May 1896 – 3 January 1907
- Born: 1848/49; Tehran, Qajar Iran
- Died: 1 November 1909; Qasr-e Shirin, Qajar Iran
- Spouse: Mozaffar ad-Din Shah Qajar
- Issue: Mohammad Ali Shah Qajar
- House: Qajar
- Father: Amir Kabir
- Mother: Ezzat ed-Dowleh

Taj ol-Molouk Khanoum Umm al-Khaghan (Persian: تاج‌الملوک خانم ام‌الخاقان; died 1 November 1909) was the royal consort of Mozaffar ad-Din Shah Qajar (r. 1896–1907) of the Sublime State of Iran.

== Life ==
She was the daughter of Mirza Mohammad Taqi Khan-e Farahani and princess Ezzat ed-Dowleh. She was a niece of Naser al-Din Shah Qajar (r. 1848–1896).

Her father had been in conflict with the Queen Mother, Malek Jahan Khanom, and was therefore exiled when she was very young. He was executed later that same year. Taj ol-Molouk and her sister were brought back to Tehran to be raised by Malek Jahan Khanom while her mother, Ezzat ed-Dowleh, was forced to remarry.

She was the mother of Mohammad Ali Shah Qajar (r. 1907–1909).

She died on 1 November 1909 in Qasr-e Shirin near Kermanshah whilst on her way to Karbala.
