= Firuz Mirza =

Qajar prince

- Farmanfarma; Nosrat od-Dowleh
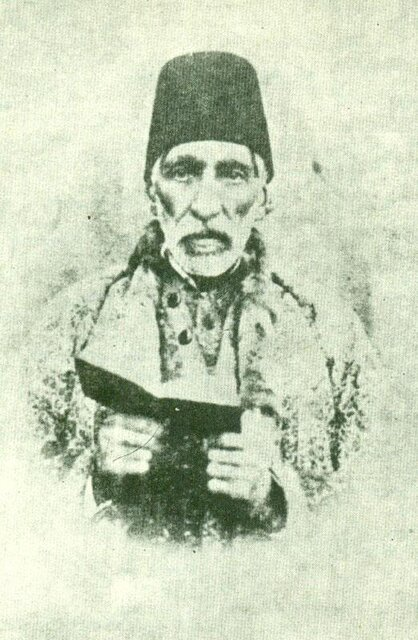
- Photograph of Firuz Mirza

Minister of War
- 1st Tenure: 1868 – 1871
- Predecessor: Aziz Khan Mokri
- Successor: Mirza Hosein Khan Sepahsalar
- 2nd Tenure: 1873 – 1874
- Predecessor: Mirza Hosein Khan Sepahsalar
- Successor: Mohammad Rahim Khan Ala ad-Dowleh
- Born: 1817
- Died: 4 April 1886 (aged 68–69)
- Spouse: Homa Khanom
- Issue: Abdol-Hossein Farman Farma; Najm al-Saltaneh; Sarvar al-Saltaneh
- Dynasty: Qajar
- Father: Abbas Mirza
- Religion: Twelver Shia Islam

Firuz Mirza Nosrat od-Dowleh Farmanfarma (Persian: فیروز میرزا نصرت الدوله فرمانفرما; 1817 – 4 April 1886) was a Qajar prince, military commander and administrator in 19th-century Iran. He was the sixteenth son of Crown Prince Abbas Mirza.

During the rule of his brother Mohammad Shah Qajar (r. 1834–1848), Firuz Mirza had a prosperous political and military career. This continued under his nephew Naser al-Din Shah Qajar (r. 1848–1896), who appointed him to multiple governorships and other leading positions. He was also a scholar and an expert with the kamancheh, a bowed string instrument.

== Career ==
=== Revolt of Hossein Ali Mirza ===
Upon the accession of Mohamamd Shah, Hossein Ali Mirza, the shah's uncle and governor of Fars, laid claim to the throne and was supported by his brother Hasan Ali Mirza. An army was dispatched from Tehran under Manuchehr Khan Gorji and two English officers Henry Lindsay Bethune and Justin Sheil to quell the rebellion and install the youthful Firuz Mirza as the new governor of Fars. The rebellious army was defeated at Qomsha (today Shahreza) near Isfahan, the rebels were sent to Tehran, and Firuz Mirza took over the governorship of Fars with Manuchehr Khan as his minister. In 1836, Firuz Mirza was removed from the government of fars and sent as governor to Kerman to replace Aga Khan Mahallati, who had been summoned to Tehran. In 1839, Aga Khan rose up against Mohammad Shah and took refuge in Arg-e Bam, Firuz Mirza arrested him after the fourteen months siege.

Firuz Mirza subsequently held several high-ranking administrative and military offices under Naser al-Din Shah. He served as governor of Fars for a second time in 1849–1850, governor of Arak in 1857 and 1875, and governor of Tehran in 1858. In 1859, during the shah's three-month tour of the country, he acted as head of the government in the monarch's absence. He served as minister of war in 1868–1871 and 1873–1874, and was appointed vizier of Azerbaijan on three occasions, beginning in 1863. In 1879, he became governor of Kerman and Baluchistan. Firuz Mirza was also a member of the Government’s Consultative Assembly in 1859 and accompanied Naser al-Din Shah on his first European journey in 1873. He led several military campaigns during the shah's reign and was granted the title of Farmanfarma in 1876.

== Family ==
Firuz Mirza with his children

The current Firuz and Farmanfarmaian families are descended from the offspring of Firuz Mirza and his wife Homa Khanom, the granddaughter of Fath-Ali Shah Qajar (r. 1797–1834). One of them were their son Abdol-Hossein Farman Farma. Firuz Mirza's daughter Najm al-Saltaneh was the mother of Iranian politician Mohammad Mosaddegh. His other daughter, Sarvar al-Saltaneh, was a consort of Mozaffar ad-Din Shah Qajar.

== Sources ==
- Mahdavi, Shireen (1999). "Farmānfarmā, Fīrūz Mīrzā". In Yarshater, Ehsan (ed.). Encyclopædia Iranica (Online ed.). Encyclopædia Iranica Foundation. doi:10.1163/2330-4804_EIRO_COM_9589.
- Mir, Cyrus (1999). "Farmānfarmā, ʿAbd-al-Ḥosayn Mīrzā". In Yarshater, Ehsan (ed.). Encyclopædia Iranica (Online ed.). Encyclopædia Iranica Foundation.
- Hambly, Gavin R. G. (1999). "Farmānfarmā, Ḥosayn-ʿAlī Mīrzā". In Yarshater, Ehsan (ed.). Encyclopædia Iranica (Online ed.). Encyclopædia Iranica Foundation.

Government offices
Preceded by Hossein Ali Mirza	Governor of Fars; 1st Tenure; 1834 – 1836	Succeeded by Aga Khan I
Preceded by —	Governor of Fars; 2nd Tenure; 1849 – 1850	Succeeded by —
Preceded by —	Governor of Arak; 1st Tenure; 1857	Succeeded by —
Preceded by —	Governor of Tehran; 1858	Succeeded by —
Preceded by —	Governor of Arak; 2nd Tenure; 1875	Succeeded by —
Preceded by —	Governor of Kerman and Baluchestan; 1879	Succeeded by —
Military offices
Preceded by Aziz Khan Mokri	Minister of War; 1868–1871	Succeeded by Mirza Hosein Khan Sepahsalar
Preceded by Mirza Hosein Khan Sepahsalar	Minister of War; 1873–1874	Succeeded by Mohammad Rahim Khan Ala ad-Dowleh
