= Mozaffar ad-Din Shah Qajar =

Shah of Iran from 1896 to 1907

Mozaffar ad-Din Shah Qajar مظفرالدین شاه قاجار
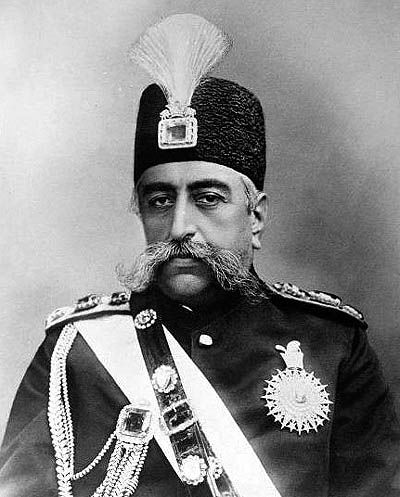
- Mozaffar ad-Din in 1906

Shah of Iran
- Reign: 1 May 1896 – 8 January 1907
- Predecessor: Naser al-Din Shah Qajar
- Successor: Mohammad Ali Shah Qajar
- Prime Minister: Mirza Nasrullah Khan
- Born: 23 March 1853; Tehran, Qajar Iran
- Died: 8 January 1907 (aged 53); Tehran, Qajar Iran
- Burial: Imam Hussein Shrine
- Spouses: Taj ol-Molouk; Sarvar al-Saltaneh
- Issue: See below
Names
- Shahinshah al-Sultan Muzaffar al-Din Qajar Allah Khalad ul-Mulk
- Dynasty: Qajar
- Father: Naser al-Din Shah
- Mother: Shokouh al-Saltaneh
- Religion: Twelver Shia Islam
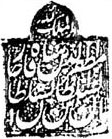
- Tughra

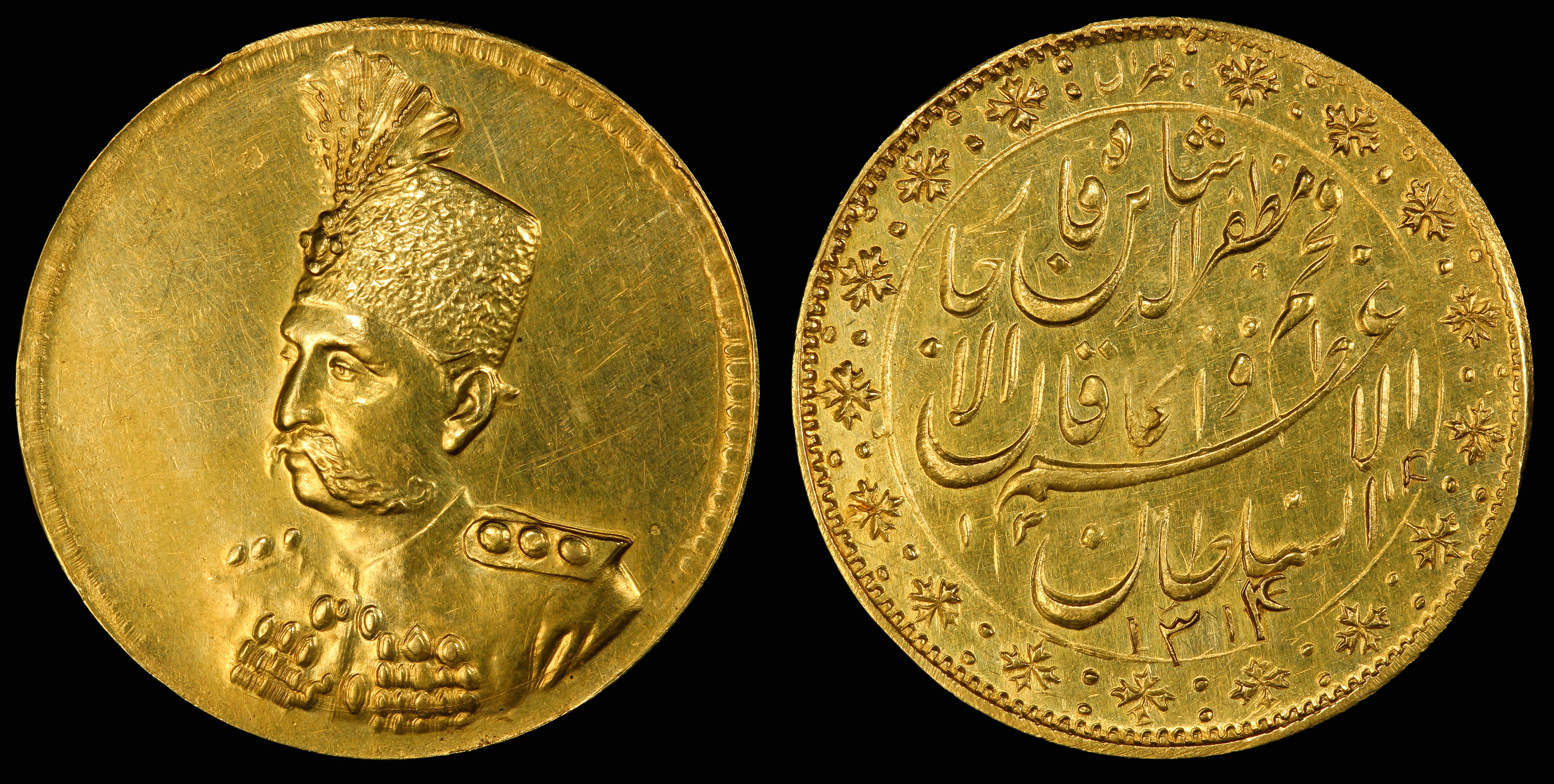
Mozaffar ad-Din Shah Qajar depicted on a 10 toman gold coin dated AH 1314 (c. 1896).

Mozaffar ad-Din Shah Qajar (Persian: مظفرالدین شاه قاجار, romanized: Mozaffareddin Šāh-e Qājār; 23 March 1853 – 8 January 1907) was the fifth Qajar shah of Iran, reigning from 1896 until his death in 1907. He is often credited with the creation of the Persian Constitution of 1906, which he approved of in one of his final acts as shah.

== Biography ==
Mozaffar ad-Din was born on 23 March 1853 in Tehran, the capital of Iran. He was the fourth son of Naser al-Din Shah Qajar (r. 1848–1896). His mother was Shokouh al-Saltaneh, a daughter of Fathollah Mirza and a granddaughter of the second Qajar shah Fath-Ali Shah (r. 1797–1834).

Mozaffar al-Din was named crown prince and sent as governor to the northern province of Azerbaijan in 1861. His father, Naser al-Din Shah ruled Iran for close to 48 years. Mozaffar al-Din spent his 35 years as crown prince in the pursuit of pleasure; his relations with his father were frequently strained, and he was not consulted in important matters of state. Thus, when he ascended the throne in May 1896, he was unprepared for the burdens of office.

During his visit to the Ottoman Empire in 1900, Mozaffar al-Din was photographed by Ottoman photographer Ali Sami Bey, who prepared an eleven-photograph album documenting his visit and journey along the Bosporus. The Shah commissioned twelve additional copies of the album.

At Mozaffar al-Din's accession, Iran faced a financial crisis, with annual governmental expenditures far in excess of revenues as a result of the policies of his father. During his reign, Mozzafar ad-Din attempted some reforms of the central treasury; however, the previous debt incurred by the Qajar court, owed to both England and Russia, significantly undermined this effort. He furthered this debt by borrowing even more funds from Britain, France, and Russia. These later loans were used to pay earlier loans rather than create new economic developments. In 1901, Mozzaffar ad-Din signed the D'Arcy Concession, granting William Knox D'Arcy, a British subject, the exclusive rights to oil in most of the country. In 1908, oil was finally discovered at a site in Masjed Soleyman.

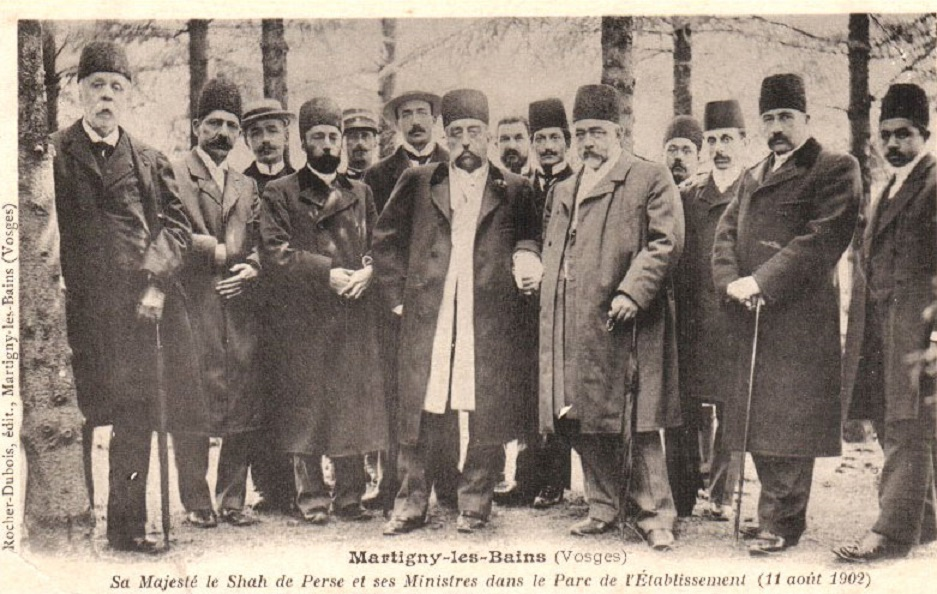
The Shah and his retinue taking the waters at a French spa

Like his father he visited Europe three times. During these periods, on the encouragements of his chancellor Amin-os-Soltan, he borrowed money from Nicholas II of Russia to pay for his extravagant traveling expenses. During his first visit he was introduced to the "cinematographe" in Paris, France. Immediately falling in love with the silver screen the Shah ordered his personal photographer to acquire all the equipment and knowledge needed to bring the moving picture to Iran, thus starting Persian cinema. The following is a translated excerpt from the Shah's diary:

....[At] 9:00 p.m. we went to the Exposition and the Festival Hall where they were showing cinematographe, which consists of still and motion pictures. Then we went to Illusion building ....In this Hall they were showing cinematographe. They erected a very large screen in the centre of the Hall, turned off all electric lights and projected the picture of cinematography on that large screen. It was very interesting to watch. Among the pictures were Africans and Arabians traveling with camels in the African desert, which was very interesting. Other pictures were of the Exposition, the moving street, the Seine River and ships crossing the river, people swimming and playing in the water and many others that were all very interesting. We instructed Akkas Bashi to purchase all kinds of it [cinematographic equipment] and bring to Tehran so God willing he can make some there and show them to our servants.

Additionally, in order to manage the costs of the state and his extravagant personal lifestyle Mozaffar ad-din Shah decided to sign many concessions, providing foreigners with monopolistic control of various Persian industries and markets. One example was the D'Arcy Concession.

Widespread fears amongst the aristocracy, educated elites, and religious leaders about the concessions and foreign control resulted in some protests in 1906. These resulted in the Shah accepting a suggestion to create a Majles (National Consultative Assembly) in October 1906, by which the monarch's power was curtailed as he granted a constitution and parliament to the people. He died of a heart attack 40 days after granting this constitution and was buried in Imam Husayn Shrine in Kerbala.

== Personality and health ==
The responsibilities of leading such a dysfunctional and possibly unstable nation were not suitable for Mozaffar ad-Din Shah's character and demeanor. He was hesitant, introverted, erratic, as well as sentimental and prone to superstition. His "nervous disposition" was described by several people who knew him well. Mozaffar ad-Din Shah had hypochondria due to having health issues since he was young. He had a number of illnesses, including a weak heart, but his most severe problem was a chronic kidney infection. Despite this, he enjoyed riding, hunting, and shooting, just as well as his ancestors.

According to the modern Iranian historian Abbas Amanat, Mozaffar ad-Din Shah "possessed neither his father’s panache nor his political skills to pull strings at the court and the divan, or to play the competing European powers off one another to his own advantage. He was a man of gentle disposition, with an earnest desire to open up the country to social and educational reforms." The British diplomat Mortimer Durand, who was well-acquainted with both shahs, wrote that Mozaffar ad-Din Shah "is more amiable than his father but he is weak and easily misled".

== Family ==
- Taj ol-Molouk, daughter of Amir Kabir and Princess Ezzat ed-Dowleh. She was the first cousin of Mozaffar being a niece of Nassir din Shah and grand-daughter of Mohammad Shah.
  - Prince Mohammad-Ali Mirza E’tezad es-Saltaneh, later Mohammad Ali Shah (1872–1925)
  - Princess Ezzat od-Dowleh (1872–1955) married Abdol-Hossein Farman Farma
  - Ahmad Mirza, died young.
- Sarvar al-Saltaneh, daughter of Nosrat-od-Dowleh Firouz Mirza and great-grand-daughter of Fath-Ali Shah.
  - Princess Fakhr os-Saltaneh (1870–?) married Abdol Majid Mirza Eyn od-Dowleh
    - Princess Ehteram os-Saltaneh (1871–?) married Morteza-Qoli Khan Hedayat Sani od-Dowleh
    - Fatemeh Khanom Qajar, Ezzat ol-Dowleh II (1873–?)
    - Qamar ed-Dowleh (1875-?), married her cousin Mirza Hossein Khan Motamed ol-Molk the son of Ezzat ed-Dowleh and Mirza Yahya Khan Moshir od-Dowleh.
    - Princess Shokuh os-Saltaneh (1880–?)
    - Princess Fakhr-ol-Dowleh (1883–1955) mother of Ali Amini
    - Princess Anvar od-Dowleh (1896–?) married Eghtedar es-Saltaneh son of Kamran Mirza
    - Prince Nasser-od-Din Mirza Nasser os-Saltaneh (1897–1977)
- Zia Saltaneh
- Nour ol-Dowleh
  - Prince Abolfath Mirza Salar od-Dowleh (1881–1959)
  - Prince Abolfazl Mirza Azd os-Sultan (1882–1970)
  - Eshrat ol-Saltaneh
- Mahin al-Saltaneh
  - Hossein Gholi Mirza
  - Prince Hossein-Ali Mirza Nosrat os-Saltaneh (1884–1945)
- Khanum Nezhat ol-Molk
  - Prince Malek Mansur Mirza Shoa as-Saltaneh (1880–1920) married Farah al-Saltaneh, daughter of Abbas Mirza Eftekhar Nezam (grandson of Mohammad Vali Mirza, third son of Fath-Ali Shah Qajar)
  - Princess Aghdas od-Dowleh (1891–?)
- Unknown wives
  - Princess Shokuh od-Dowleh (1883–?)
  - Princess Parastou od-Dowleh (1900–2010)
  - Princess Forough al-Molk (1902)

Mozaffar also married Nikah mut'ah wives and had issue.

== List of premiers ==
- Mirza Ali Asghar Khan Amin al-Soltan (till November 1896) (1st time)
- Post vacant (November 1896 – February 1897)
- Mirza Ali Khan Amin od-Dowleh (February 1897 – June 1898)
- Mirza Ali Asghar Khan Amin al-Soltan (June 1898 – 24 January 1904) (2nd time)
- Prince Abdol-Majid Mirza Eyn od-Dowleh (24 January 1904 – 5 August 1906)
- Mirza Nasrollah Khan Ashtiani Moshir od-Dowleh (1906 – 18 February 1907)

== Historical anecdotes ==
The Shah visited the United Kingdom in August 1902 with the anticipation of also receiving the Order of the Garter as it had been previously given to his father, Naser-ed-Din Shah. King Edward VII refused to give this high honour to a non-Christian. Lord Lansdowne, the Foreign Secretary, had designs drawn up for a new version of the Order, without the Cross of St. George. The King was so enraged by the sight of the design, though, that he threw it out of his yacht's porthole. However, in 1903, the King had to back down and the Shah was appointed a member of the Order.

A nephew of his wife was Mohammad Mosaddegh, a Prime Minister of Iran during the Pahlavi era. On 19 August 1953, Mossadegh was overthrown by a coup d'état staged by the United Kingdom (Third Churchill ministry) and the United States (Eisenhower administration).

== Honours ==
- Austria-Hungary:
  - Grand Cross of the Imperial Order of Leopold, 1894
  - Grand Cross of the Royal Hungarian Order of Saint Stephen, in Brilliants, 1899
- Belgium: Grand Cordon of the Order of Leopold (military), in Brilliants, 1903
- France: Grand Cross of the National Order of the Legion of Honour, 1903
- Kingdom of Prussia:
  - Knight of the Order of the Black Eagle, in Brilliants, 29 May 1902 – during the visit to Berlin of the Shah
  - Grand Cross of the Order of the Red Eagle, 29 May 1902
- Kingdom of Italy:
  - Knight of the Supreme Order of the Most Holy Annunciation, May 1902 – during the visit to Rome of the Shah
  - Grand Cross of the Order of Saints Maurice and Lazarus, 1903
- Netherlands: Grand Cross of the Order of the Netherlands Lion, 1900
- Ottoman Empire:
  - Hanedan-i-Ali-Osman Nishani, 1900
  - Nishan-i-Imtiaz, 1900
- Kingdom of Romania: Grand Cross of the Order of the Star of Romania, in Brilliants, 23 May 1906
- Russian Empire:
  - Knight of the Order of Saint Andrew the Apostle the First-called, 1902
  - Knight of the Imperial Order of Saint Alexander Nevsky, 1902
  - Knight of the Imperial Order of the White Eagle, 1902
  - Knight of the Imperial Order of Saint Stanislaus, 1st Class, 1902
  - Knight of the Imperial Order of Saint Anna, 1st Class in Brilliants, 1902
- Spain: Knight of the Order of the Golden Fleece, 6 September 1902 – from special envoys of the Spanish King visiting the Shah while he was in Paris during his European tour
- United Kingdom: Stranger Knight Companion of the Most Noble Order of the Garter (KG), 16 February 1903

== See also ==
- Anglo-Russian Convention
- Mozaffar's Garden, an Iranian TV show about a modern-day Qajar Khan
- D'Arcy Concession
- Fakhr-ol-Dowleh
- Kamal ol-Molk
- Persian Constitution of 1906
- Persian Constitutional Revolution
- Ottoman invasion of Persia (1906)
- Qajar family tree
- Samad Khan Momtaz os-Saltaneh, ambassador of Persia to Paris

== Sources ==
- Amanat, Abbas (1997). Pivot of the Universe: Nasir Al-Din Shah Qajar and the Iranian Monarchy, 1831–1896. I. B. Tauris. ISBN 978-1845118280.
- Amanat, Abbas (2017). Iran: A Modern History. Yale University Press. ISBN 978-0-300-11254-2.
- Burrell, Robert Michael (1979). Aspects of the Reign of Muzaffar al-Din Shah of Persia: 1896–1907. University of London.
- Burrell, Robert Michael (1993). "Muẓaffar al-Dīn S̲h̲āh Kad̲j̲ār". In Bosworth, C. E.; van Donzel, E.; Heinrichs, W. P. & Pellat, Ch. (eds.). The Encyclopaedia of Islam, Second Edition. Volume VII: Mif–Naz. Leiden: E. J. Brill. ISBN 978-90-04-09419-2.

Mozaffar ad-Din Shah Qajar Qajar dynasty Born: 23 March 1853 Died: 8 January 1907
Iranian royalty
Preceded by Naser al-Din Shah Qajar	Shah of Iran; 1896–1907	Succeeded by Mohammad Ali Shah Qajar
