= 1939 in Iran =

- Decades: 1910s; 1920s; 1930s; 1940s; 1950s
- See also: Other events of 1939; Years in Iran

The following lists events that happened during 1939 in Pahlavi Iran.

== Incumbents ==
- Shah: Reza Shah
- Prime Minister: Mahmoud Djam (until October 26), Ahmad Matin-Daftari (starting October 26)

== Events ==
- 1939 Iranian legislative election.

== Births ==
- January 3 – Javad Fakoori, Iranian military officer.
- January 11 – Ali Rafie, Theatre, cinema director and stage designer.
- February 2 – Kambiz Atabay, President of AFC.
- February 3 – Esfandiar Lari, Iranian sports shooter.
- February 5 – Iraj Safdari, Iranian make-up artist.
- February 7 – Hassan Habibi (footballer), Iranian association football player.
- February 9 – Ali Adjalli, Founder of the "Gol Gasht" school of calligraphy.
- March 5 – Iraj Nazerian, Iranian artist.
- March 9 – Nader Ardalan, Iranian and American architect, urban planner, writer.
- March 11 – Bahman Salehnia, Iranian football manager.
- March 25 – Jalal Keshmiri, Olympic athlete.
- March 27 – Leila Kasra, Iranian contemporary poet and lyricist.
- March 28 – Manouchehr Esmaeili, Iranian voice actor and artist.
- March 31 – Gholamali Raisozzakerin, poet.
- April 19 – Ali Khamenei, cleric and former Supreme Leader of Iran from 1989 to 2026.
- April 22 – Mahmoud Yavari, Iranian football coach.
- April 30 – Ali Yachkaschi, Iranian scientist.
- May 17 – Kourosh Zaim, Iranian translator.
- June 12 – Marzieh Hadidchi, Iranian politician.
- June 20 – Feizollah Bandali, Iranian skier.
- June 24 – Samad Behrangi, Iranian writer and social critic.
- June 26 – Mohammad Poursattar, Iranian actor.
- July 10 – Siah Armajani, American sculptor and architect.
- July 21 – Nematollah Aghasi, Iranian singer.
- July 24 – Anoushiravan Rohani, Iranian Accordion, pianist and songwriter.
- August 4 – Akbar Babakhanloo, Iranian sprinter.
- September 1 – Abdul Majid Arfaei, Iranian archaeologist and linguist.
- October 3 – Akbar Radi, Iranian playwright.
- October 6 – Parviz Jalayer, weightlifter.
- October 10 – Goli Taraghi, Iranian writer.
- October 12 – Mohammad-Reza Shafiei Kadkani, Iranian poet, literary critic, editor and translator.
- October 14 – Javad Mojabi, Iranian writer.
- December 2 – Jaleh Amouzgar, Iranian Iranologist and university professor.
- December 7 – Abbas Ali Akhtari, Iranian Ayatollah.
- December 8 – Dariush Mehrjui, Iranian filmmaker.
- December 16 – Naser Tahmasb, Iranian voice actor, actor, writer and screenwriter.
- December 17 – Mehdi Fat'hi, Iranian actor.
- ? – Ahmad Alizadeh, Iranian politician.
- ? – Ahmad Khoshouei, Iranian amateur wrestler.
- ? – Ali Akbar Aboutorabi Fard, Iranian politician.

== Deaths ==
- March 10 – Ehsanollah Khan Dustdar, an early twentieth century Iranian Marxist revolutionary and leader of the Persian Socialist Soviet Republic.
- ? – Keikhosrow Shahrokh, Iranian politician.
- ? – Abdol-Hossein Farman Farma, Qajar prince.
