= 1935 in Iran =

- Decades: 1910s; 1920s; 1930s; 1940s; 1950s
- See also: Other events of 1935; Years in Iran

The following lists events that happened during 1935 in Pahlavi Iran.

== Incumbents ==
- Shah: Reza Shah
- Prime Minister: Mohammad Ali Foroughi (until December 3), Mahmoud Djam (starting December 3)

== Events ==
- 1935 Iranian legislative election.
- Goharshad Mosque rebellion.

== Births ==
- January 5 – Forugh Farrokhzad, Iranian poet.
- January 5 – Iraj Ghaderi, Iranian actor and film director.
- January 24 – Dariush Shayegan, Iranian writer, Indologist, philosopher and poet.
- January 31 – Taqi Yazdi, Iranian cleric and philosopher.
- February 4 – Ali Nassirian, Iranian actor.
- February 14 – Iraj Gorgin, Iranian journalist and voice actor.
- March 14 – Ali Mohammad Dastgheib Shirazi, Iranian activist.
- March 16 – Gholam Hossein Nourian, Iranian association football player.
- March 24 – Maliheh Afnan, Palestinian painter, born 1935, active in England.
- April 11 – Noureddin Razavi Sarvestani, Iranian singer.
- April 26 – Mahmoud Khoshnam, Persian music critic.
- May 23 – Gholam-Abbas Tavassoli, Iranian sociologist.
- May 28 – Henrik Tamraz, Iranian weightlifter.
- May 31 – Bijan Mofid, Iranian dramatist.
- June 25 – Abbas Vaez-Tabasi, Iranian ayatollah.
- July 3 – Reza Fazeli, Iranian film director and actor.
- July 9 – Ahmad Pejman, Iranian musician.
- September 7 – Mohammad Khadem, Iranian wrestler.
- September 20 – Mohammad Ami-Tehrani, Iranian weightlifter.
- October 27 – Ali Asghar Khodadoust, Iranian eye surgeon.
- November 2 – Efat Ghazi, Murder victim.
- December 13 – Reza Baraheni, Iranian writer and academic.
- December 24 – Shusha Guppy, writer, editor and singer.
- ? – Ahmad Aali, Iranian photographer and artist.
- ? – Ahmad Beheshti, Iranian politician.
- ? – Akbar Khojini, Persian boxer.
- ? – Ali-Mohammad Arab, politician.
- ? – Asadollah Lajevardi, Iranian prison warden.
- ? – Azar Hekmat Shoar, Iranian actress.
- ? – Effat Marashi, Hashemi Rafsanjani's wife.
- ? – Ezzatullah Foladvand, Iranian translator.
- ? – Habibollah Peyman, Iranian politician.
- ? – Hossein Sabet, Iranian businessman.
- ? – Javad Gharavi Aliari, Iranian grand ayatollah.
- ? – Kazem Sami, Iranian politician.
- ? – Leon Khachatourian, Iranian boxer.
- ? – Mahdi Ghalibafian, Iranian engineer.
- ? – Massoud Arabshahi, Iranian artist.
- ? – Mehdi Dibaj, Iranian Christian martyr.
- ? – Mohammad Ali Farrokhian, Iranian wrestler.

== Deaths ==
- ? – Abbas Mirza Farman Farmaian, Qajar prince.
- ? – Emad al-Kottab, Iranian artist and calligrapher.
- ? – Gholam Reza Minbashian, Iranian musician.
- ? – Hassan Pirnia, Iranian politician, lawyer and historian.
- ? – Mahmoud Alamir, Iranian politician and diplomat.
- ? – Seyyed Musa Zarabadi, Iranian ayatollah.
