= 1937 in Iran =

- Decades: 1910s; 1920s; 1930s; 1940s; 1950s
- See also: Other events of 1937; Years in Iran

The following lists events that happened during 1937 in Pahlavi Iran.

== Incumbents ==
- Shah: Reza Shah
- Prime Minister: Mahmoud Djam

== Events ==
- 1937 Iranian legislative election.

== Births ==
- January 5 – Bahram Sadeghi, Iranian poet and writer.
- January 29 – Hassan Habibi, Iranian politician.
- February 2 – Mohammad Salimi, Commander-in-chief of the Iranian Army.
- February 22 – Homa Mirafshar, Iranian poet.
- March 5 – Kamran Diba, Iranian architect.
- March 16 – Houshang Golshiri, Iranian writer.
- March 24 – Parviz Tanavoli, Iranian sculptor and painter.
- March 30 – Abbas-Ali Amid Zanjani, Iranian ayatollah.
- April 9 – Mahshid Amirshahi, Iranian writer.
- April 10 – Faramarz Pilaram, Iranian painter and calligrapher.
- May 3 – Mohammad Hoqouqi, Iranian writer.
- May 5 – Homayun (actor), Iranian actor.
- May 27 – Vida Ghahremani, Iranian actress.
- June 19 – Majid Samii, Iranian neurosurgeon.
- June 22 – Siavash Teimouri, Iranian architect and artist.
- July 25 – Hooshmand Aghili, Iranian singer.
- August 25 – Forouzan, Iranian actor and film producer.
- September 10 – Fereydoun Tonekaboni, Iranian writer.
- September 25 – Abbas Shafiee, Iranian pharmaceutical chemist.
- September 26 – Mehdi Karroubi, Iranian reformist politician, democracy activist, mojtahed, and chairman of the National Trust Party.
- September 29 – Reza Ostadi, Iranian ayatollah.
- October 3 – Behrouz Servatian, Iranian literary, translator, essayist and writer.
- October 12 – Loris Tjeknavorian, Armenian-Iranian conductor and composer.
- October 16 – Yousef Saanei, Iranian grand ayatollah.
- December 16 – Ahmad Tafazzoli, Iranian academic.
- December 23 – Mohammad Heydari, Iranian composer and musician.
- December 24 – Hassan Ali Mehran, Persian politician.
- December 31 – Alireza Ghelichkhani, Iranian sport wrestler.
- ? – Ali Akbar Sadeghi, Iranian animator.
- ? – Ali Mohammad Momeni, Iranian amateur wrestler.
- ? – Ali Shahbazi, Commander-in-chief of the Iranian Army.
- ? – Bijan Samandar, Iranian poet and songwriter.
- ? – Gholam A. Peyman, American physician.
- ? – Hamid Mowlana, Iranian politician.
- ? – Hashem Sabbaghian, Iranian politician.
- ? – Hossein Zenderoudi, Iranian painter and printmaker.
- ? – Leyly Matine-Daftary, Iranian artist.
- ? – Mahmoud Anbarani, Iranian poet, writer, scholar.
- ? – Mohammad-Reza Zarrindast, pharmacologist.
- ? – Mohsen Kharazi, Iranian ayatollah.

== Deaths ==
- January 30 – Abdolkarim Haeri Yazdi, Iranian Grand Ayatollah.
- February 10 – Ali-Akbar Davar, Iranian politician.
- May 6 – Majd ed-Dowleh Qajar-Qovanlu Amirsoleimani, Persian prince and politician.
- December 1 – Hassan Modarres, Prime Minister of Iran.
- ? – Amanullah Mirza Qajar, Iranian prince.
- ? – Bibi Maryam Bakhtiari, Iranian politician.
- ? – Hasan Badi', Iranian-Iraqi writer, poet and journalist.
- ? – Mohammad Aghazadeh Khorasani, Iran Scientist.
- ? – Reza Khan Arfa Danesh, Iranian diplomat and poet.
- ? – Shahrzad (Reza Kamal), Iranian writer.
- ? – Firouz Nosrat-ed-Dowleh III, Qajar prince and Iranian politician.
