= 1940 in Iran =

- Decades: 1920s; 1930s; 1940s; 1950s; 1960s
- See also: Other events of 1940; Years in Iran

The following lists events that happened during 1940 in Pahlavi Iran.

== Incumbents ==
- Shah: Reza Shah
- Prime Minister: Ahmad Matin-Daftari (until June 26), Ali Mansur (starting June 26)

== Births ==
- January 4 – Hossein Elahi Ghomshei, writer.
- January 26 – Hooshang Samadi, Iranian army and navy officer.
- January 31 – Hamid Mosadegh, Iranian poet, author and lawyer.
- February 2 – Hossein Gharib, Iranian physician.
- February 3 – Seyed Kazem Ghiyassian, Iranian footballer.
- February 8 – Gholam Hossein Amirkhani, Iranian Calligrapher.
- February 15 – Yousof Safvat, Chess Player.
- February 24 – Nasrollah Nasehpour, Iranian musician.
- March 3 – Haleh Esfandiari, Iranian academic.
- March 10 – Abdollah Movahed, Iranian wrestler.
- March 25 – Bijan Zarnegar, Iranian fencer.
- April 4 – Bijan (designer), Iranian designer.
- April 8 – Daniel Gevargiz, Iranian weightlifter.
- April 24 – Sadegh Malek Shahmirzadi, Iranian archaeologist.
- May 4 – Ali Mohammad Haghshenas, Iranian linguist and translator.
- May 20 – Ahmadreza Ahmadi, Iranian poet and screenwriter.
- June 13 – Giti Pashaei, Iranian musician.
- June 22 – Abbas Kiarostami, Iranian film director, screenwriter, photographer and film producer.
- July 1 – Fariborz Esmaeili, Iranian football.
- July 3 – Roy Mottahedeh, American academic.
- July 21 – Taher Sabahi, Expert on European carpets.
- August 1 – Mahmoud Dowlatabadi, Iranian writer and actor.
- August 3 – Ali Asghar Badiazadegan, co-founder of the People's Mujahedin of Iran.
- August 10 – Aref (singer), Iranian singer and former actor.
- August 12 – Seyyed Ali Shafiei, Iranian politician.
- August 20 – Nasser Ebrahimi, Iranian footballer.
- September 9 – Cihangir Ghaffari, Iranian actor.
- September 23 – Mohammad-Reza Shajarian, Iranian singer and musician.
- October 11 – Pouri Banayi, Iranian actress.
- October 12 – Masoud Bakhtiari, Iranian teacher, poet and singer.
- October 23 – Lotfollah Meisami, Iranian journalist and publisher.
- October 27 – Shahnaz Pahlavi, Princess of Iran.
- October 28 – Changiz Jalilvand, Iranian Voice Actor.
- October 30 – Aydin Aghdashloo, Iranian painter.
- November 13 – Zahra Mostafavi Khomeini, Iranian politician.
- November 20 – Mohammad-Ali Sepanlou, Iranian writer.
- December 19 – Soraya Qasemi, Iranian actress.
- December 26 – Saeid Pirdoost, Iranian actor.
- December 27 – Menashe Amir, Israeli journalist and radio personality.
- ? – Abdolkarim Lahiji, Iranian politician.

== Deaths ==
- January 18 – Mohammad Ali Tarbiat, Iranian politician and journalist.
- February 4 – Taqi Arani, Iranian publisher.
- August 18 – Kamal-ol-molk, Iranian artist.
- ? – Aziz al-Soltan, Iranian royal page.
- ? – David Benjamin Keldani, Catholic convert to Islam.
- ? – Menahem Shemuel Halevy, Iranian rabbi.
