= 1936 in Iran =

- Decades: 1910s; 1920s; 1930s; 1940s; 1950s
- See also: Other events of 1936; Years in Iran

The following lists events that happened during 1936 in Pahlavi Iran.

== Incumbents ==
- Shah: Reza Shah
- Prime Minister: Mahmoud Djam

== Events ==
- January 8 – Kashf-e hijab.

== Births ==
- January 4 – Gholam-Hossein Sa'edi, Iranan writer.
- January 25 – Nikol Faridani, Iranian photographer.
- February 3 – Mongashti Amirian, Iranian weightlifter.
- February 24 – Sadegh Ghotbzadeh, Iranian politician.
- March 1 – Mansoor Ghandriz, Iranian artist.
- March 1 – Mostafa Sho'aiyan, Iranian essayist.
- March 16 – Abdolvahab Shahkhoreh, Iranian sprinter.
- March 21 – Mehdi Tabatabaei, Iranian politician.
- March 25 – Parviz Sabeti, Iranian intelligence officer.
- April 3 – Nader Ebrahimi, Iranian writer and film director.
- April 6 – Noureddin Zarrinkelk, Iranian animator, author and illustrator.
- April 22 – Mehdi Behzad, Iranian mathematician.
- May 9 – Hassan Abshenasan, Iranian soldier.
- May 22 – Mehri Vadadian, Iranian actress.
- June 15 – Reza Beyk Imanverdi, Iranian actor.
- June 24 – Siamak Atlasi, Iranian film director, actor and voice actor.
- August 23 – Bagher Shirazi, Iranian architect and faculty.
- August 25 – Hamid Jasemian, footballer.
- August 26 – Morteza Momayez, Iranian graphic designer.
- September 2 – Iran Darroudi, Iranian female artist.
- September 22 – Parviz Yahaghi, Iranian Musician & Composer.
- October 7 – Salim Moazenzadeh Ardabili, Iranian maddah and muezzin.
- October 15 – Parviz C. Radji, Iranian diplomat.
- November 18 – Tahereh Saffarzadeh, Iranian academic.
- December 2 – Esmaeel Khalaj, Iranian actor.
- December 3 – Baquer Namazi, Iranian-American prisoner in Iran.
- December 4 – Varoujan Hakhbandian, Iranian songwriter, composer and arranger of Armenian descent.
- December 30 – Esmaeil Elmkhah, Iranian weightlifter.
- ? – Abdollah Khodabandeh, Iranian wrestler.
- ? – Ahmad Ghazi, Iranian writer.
- ? – Albert Hakim, Iranian businessman.
- ? – Andranik Ovassapian, professor of anesthesia and critical care at the University of Chicago.
- ? – Artem Ohandjanian, Austrian-Armenian historian.
- ? – Bahram Akasheh, Iranian geophysicist and seismologist.
- ? – Firouz Partovi, Iranian physicist.
- ? – Gholam Reza Afkhami, Iranian historian.
- ? – Habibollah Ashouri, Iranian politician.
- ? – Hossein Aslani, Iranian musician.
- ? – Janet Mikhaili, Iranian illustrator.
- ? – Mansour Nariman, Iranian musician.

== Deaths ==
- January 25 – Tadj al-Saltaneh, Persian princess and memoirist of the Qajar Dynasty..
- January 26 – Mahmoud Alamir, Iranian politician and diplomat.
- May 24 – Khazʽal Ibn Jabir, Sheikh of Mohammerah.
- August 14 – Muhammad Hussain Naini, Iranian Islamic scholar.
- ? – Sayed Ali Asghar Kurdistani, Iranian singer.
- ? – Tuba Azmudeh, Iranian educator.
