= 1938 in Iran =

- Decades: 1910s; 1920s; 1930s; 1940s; 1950s
- See also: Other events of 1938; Years in Iran

The following lists events that happened during 1938 in Pahlavi Iran.

== Incumbents ==
- Shah: Reza Shah
- Prime Minister: Mahmoud Djam

== Births ==
- January 7 – Houshang Ghazvini, Iranian sports shooter.
- January 11 – Sadegh Sharafkandi, Assassinated Iranian/Kurdish politician.
- January 13 – Mohammad Momen, Member of the Expediency Discernment Council and the Assembly of Experts.
- January 27 – Parviz Fannizadeh, Iranian actor.
- February 9 – Abolfazl Anvari, Iranian amateur wrestler.
- February 14 – Jalal Keshmiri, Olympic athlete.
- February 18 – Azartash Azarnoosh, Iranian academic.
- February 24 – Yusef Majidzadeh, Iranian archaeologist.
- February 27 – Manouchehr Farid, Iranian actor.
- March 3 – Ahmad Jafari, Iranian architect.
- March 3 – Sadegh Tabrizi, Iranian painter, calligrapher, designer.
- March 7 – Jalal Zolfonun, Iranian musician.
- March 10 – Behrouz Vossoughi, Iranian actor.
- March 11 – Farhad Fakhreddini, Iranian musician.
- March 14 – Parvaneh Forouhar, Iranian activist.
- March 18 – Mohammad Ali Sanatkaran, Olympic wrestler.
- March 22 – Mohammad Javad Tondguyan, Iranian engineer.
- April 5 – Reza Ghotbi, Iranian engineer.
- April 9 – Aziz Asli, Iranian footballer and manager.
- April 12 – Iraj Kaboli, Iranian writer.
- May 1 – Parviz Nouri, Iranian film director.
- June 1 – Lotfollah Kiashemshaki, Iranian skier.
- June 23 – Hassan Ayat, Iranian politician.
- June 24 – Bahram Hooshyar, Iran Air Force General.
- July 3 – Ebrahim Seifpour, Olympic wrestler.
- July 3 – Khosrow Shakeri Zand, Iranian historian.
- July 6 – Manny Mashouf, American businessman, billionaire, philanthropist.
- July 9 – Kambozia Jamali, Iranian footballer.
- July 28 – Mohammad-Hadi Abdekhodaei, Iranian philosopher.
- August 2 – Dariush Ashoori, Iranian writer, translator, linguist and researcher.
- August 11 – Hajir Darioush, Iranian film maker.
- August 14 – Mansour Mehdizadeh, Olympic wrestler.
- September 9 – Mazhar Khaleqi, Iranian singer.
- October 7 – Fereydoun Farrokhzad, Iranian entertainer.
- October 7 – Hadi Tavoosi, Iranian footballer.
- October 14 – Farah Pahlavi, queen/empress consort of Iran from 1959 to 1979.
- October 31 – Rasoul Mirmalek, Iranian wrestler.
- November 30 – Rouben Galichian, Armenian scholar.
- December 7 – Houshang Zarif, Iranian tar player.
- December 11 – Heshmat Mohajerani, Iranian footballer and manager.

== Deaths ==
- July 16 – Avetis Sultan-Zade, Persian-born ethnic Armenian communist and economist.
- ? – Musa bey Rafiyev, Azerbaijani politician.
- ? – Yussef E'tesami, Iranian journalist, politician, publisher.
