= 1933 in Iran =

- Decades
- See also: Other events of 1933; Years in Iran

The following lists events that happened during 1933 in Pahlavi Iran.

== Incumbents ==
- Shah: Reza Shah
- Prime Minister: Mehdi Qoli Hedayat (until September 18), Mohammad Ali Foroughi (starting September 18)

== Births ==
- January 2 – Iraj (singer), Iranian singer.
- January 17 – Sadruddin Aga Khan, UN High Commissioner for Refugees.
- February 4 – Freidoune Sahebjam, French-Iranian journalist.
- February 10 – Faramarz Payvar, Iranian composer and santurist.
- March 15 – Hossein Mollaghasemi, Iranian actor.
- March 21 – Parviz Dehdari, Iranian footballer and coach.
- March 22 – Abolhassan Banisadr, Iranian politician and economist, and Iran's first President.
- March 22 – Rubaba Muradova, Azerbaijani singer.
- April 4 – Habibollah Badiee, Iranian musician, violinist.
- April 4 – Mojtaba Tehrani, Iranian cleric.
- April 7 – Seyyed Hossein Nasr, Iranian philosopher, theologian and Islamic scholar.
- May 9 – Jamal Mirsadeghi, Iranian novelist and short story writer.
- June 15 – Mohammad-Ali Rajai, Iranian Prime Minister and President of Iran.
- July 6 – Reza Davari Ardakani, Iranian philosopher.
- July 7 – Mansour Amirasefi, Footballer.
- July 11 – Mohammad Maleki, Iranian human rights activist and former president of the University of Tehran.
- July 16 – Davoud Rashidi, Iranian actor.
- July 23 – Lotfollah Yarmohammadi, Iranian linguist.
- July 26 – Parviz Bahram, Iranian voice actor.
- September 4 – Jahangir Darvish, Iranian architect.
- September 5 – Mohammad-Javad Bahonar, Iranian cleric.
- September 6 – Ahmad Ahmadi (philosopher), Iranian politician.
- October 25 – Hamid Tavakkol, Iranian freestyle wrestler.
- October 29 – Hooshang Talé, Iranian politician.
- November 13 – Maziar Partow, Iranian cinematographer.
- November 23 – Ali Shariati, Iranian writer, scholar of Islam, and political activist.
- December 5 – Najmeddin Farabi, Iranian athlete.
- December 9 – Mahmoud Mosharraf Azad Tehrani, Iranian writer.
- December 26 – Ebrahim Victory, Iranian scientist.
- ? – Ahmad Moftizadeh, Kurdish nationalist and Islamist leader.
- ? – Hourieh Peramaa, Kazakhstani businessman.
- ? – Jalaleddin Farsi, Iranian politician.
- ? – Karim Vessal, Iranian medical researcher.
- ? – Khosrow Parvizi, 1933-2012 Iranian film editor and screenwriter.
- ? – Mahmoud Ahmadzadeh, Iranian politician.
- ? – Mehdi Bahadori, Professor at Sharif University of Technology.
- ? – Mohammad Ebrahim Jannaati, Iranian Grand Ayatollah.
- ? – Nabi Sorouri, Olympic wrestler.
- ? – Reza Vohdani, Iranian musician.
- ? – Shapoor Gharib, Iranian director.

== Deaths ==
- August 14 – Ghassem Khan Vali, Sardar Homayoun, Iranian general.
- October 3 – Abdolhossein Teymourtash, Iranian politician.
- December 21 – Esmail Momtaz od-Dowleh, Iranian politician.
- ? – Antoin Sevruguin, Iranian photographer.
