= Lutfullah =

Lutfullah (Arabic: لطف الله), meaning Kindness or Grace of God, is a masculine Muslim name of Arabic origin as well as Persian hybridization and distribution, most commonly occurring in Islamic Iranic & Turkic communities. Variant transliterations are Lutf Allah, Lütfullah, Lotfollah, Lutfallah.

== Historical ==
- Lutf Allah (Sarbadar) (died c. 1357/58), leader of the Sarbadars of Sabzewar
- Lutfullah Halimi (died 1516), Ottoman poet and lexicographer
- Lutfullah Khan Shirazi, Mughal faujdar of Kamrup and Sylhet
- Lutfullah Tabrizi, Naib Nazim of Jahangirnagar, and later Orissa

== Modern ==
=== Given name ===
- Lutfullah Khan (1916–2012), Pakistani author, collector and archivist
- Lotfollah Safi Golpaygani (1919–2022), Iranian Twelver Shia Marja
- Lotfi Mansouri (1929–2013), Iranian opera director
- Lotfollah Yarmohammadi (1933–2021), Iranian linguist
- Lotfollah Kia Shemshaki (born 1938), Iranian Olympic skier
- Lotfollah Meisami (born 1942), Iranian politician
- Lotfallah Zara’i Qanawati (born 1943), Iranian politician
- Lütfullah Kayalar (born 1952), Turkish lawyer and politician
- Lotfallah Siahkali (born 1961), Iranian politician
- Lotfollah Forouzandeh (born 1961), Iranian politician
- Lotfollah Dezhkam (born 1962), Iranian cleric and politician
- Lotfallah Ajdani (born 1964), Iranian historian
- Lutfullah Mashal (born 1971), Afghan politician and writer
- Lutfullah Khairkhwa, Afghan politician
- Lotfallah Najafizadeh (born 1987), Afghan journalist
- Lutfulla Turaev (born 1988), Uzbek footballer

=== Middle name ===
- Kaveh L. Afrasiabi (born 1958), Iranian-American political scientist

=== Surname ===
- Ibrahim Abdullah Lotfallah (born 1936), Bahraini businessman and philanthropist
- Mustafa Lutfullah (born 1961), Bengali politician
- Hurshil Lutfullaev (born 1983), Kyrgyz footballer
- Sharafuddin Lutfillaev (born 1990), Uzbek martial artist
- Ibrahim Lotfallah (born 1992), Bahraini footballer

== See also ==
- List of Arabic theophoric names
- Lütfullah Aksungur Sports Hall, Adana, Turkey
- Sheikh Lotfollah Mosque, Isfahan, Iran
- Darageh-ye Lotfollah, village in West Azerbaijan Province, Iran
- Qaralar-e Lotfollah, village in West Azerbaijan Province, Iran.
- Mir Lotfollah, village in Isfahan Province, Iran
