= Hajir =

Hajir may refer to:

- Hajir (also spelled Hazhir) هژیر and هجیر - Pure Persian (Indo-European) boy name spelled with the Persian/Iranian “zhe”, pre-Islamic Persian/Iranian name with various meanings such as beautiful, praiseworthy, steadfast; in old Persian form pronounced Hojir, Hozhir or Huzhir
- Hajar Hadrami (instrument) - Arabic musical drum in Yemen
- Hajir Darioush (1938-1995) - Iranian filmmaker
- Khojir - a village in Iran
- Hajir, Haajir, Haajer, or Hajer spelled حاجر - Arabic word - not used as a boy first name. notice the spelling uses different letters in that script; Islamic journey, Qur’anic term.
