= Ebrahim Victory =

Iranian mechanical engineer and author (1933–2025)

Ebrahim Victory

Ebrahim Victory

Ebrahim Victory and Neil Armstrong

Ebrahim Lotfollah Victory (Persian: ابراهیم ویکتوری; 26 December 1933 – 8 November 2025) was an Iranian mechanical engineer and researcher for the United States Air Force, the United States Navy and NASA. He was also an author and the host of a television show in Iran.

== Early life ==
Victory was born in Tehran, Iran on 26 December 1933. He attended the Kourosh Primary School and the Firooz Bahram High School in Iran. He came to the United States in 1952, and after one year of studying English at Wesley Junior College in Dover, Delaware, he attended the Massachusetts Institute of Technology from 1953 to 1958, where he received the degrees of Bachelor of Science, and Master of Science in Mechanical Engineering with specialties in textiles technology and aerodynamics.

== Career ==
During the years 1957 to 1958, he taught a course on textiles technology at the graduate school of Massachusetts Institute of Technology and performed research on a project for the U.S. Air Force designing a wind tunnel for testing parachute fabrics.

From 1958 to 1975, he participated in research projects involving the effects of nuclear weapons for the U.S. Air Force, silent propulsion systems for the U.S. Navy, and combustion instability in rockets for NASA. He also worked for Johnson and Johnson and other American industrial companies in product development.

From 1977 to 1978, he worked as a consultant to the Agriculture Ministry in Iran. Upon his return from Iran, he established his own company developing custom-made computer programs for medium-sized companies.

He is well known to the Iranian community in the United States through his interviews in various radio programs; for the past twelve years, he has been appearing on various Persian radio and television programs speaking on subjects relating to space exploration, astronomy, and cosmology. Since September 2002, he has been writing and hosting a weekly two-hour TV program called The Wonders of the Universe which has appeared on Channel One and Andisheh TV. In 2008, he hosted live television quizzes for a show called Red Chair. He awarded Golden Coins to the people who could answer scientific questions about cosmology, astronomy, and Nasa history.

He was the author of some 50 scientific articles on the results of his research and over 500 popular science articles on space, astronomy, and cosmology for various Persian language magazines and publications. His four books entitled The Wonders Of The Universe, The Mysteries Of The Universe, Part One and Two, and God, Religion and Science are a collection of some 60 of his comprehensive articles in both English and Persian. His last book is entitled Cosmic Phenomenon.

Victory was a Fellow of the Society of Sigma Xi. He was previously a member of the American Rocket Society, the American Institute of Aeronautics and Astronautics, the American Astronautical Society, the American Physical Society and the Explorers Society.

== Death ==
Victory died on 8 November 2025, at the age of 91.

== Selected publications ==
- The Wonders Of The Universe A Collection of the Scientific Writing of Ebrahim Victory. Alik Printing and Publishing Co., 1997.
- The Mysteries of the Universe Part One: A Collection of the Scientific Writings of Ebrahim Victory. Hakak Publishing, 2005.
- The Mysteries of the Universe Part Two, 2007.
- God, Religion, and Science - Why Man Created God. City Wide Printing, 2008.
- Cosmic Phenomenon, 2009.
