= Dariush Grand Hotel =

Hotel in Kish, Iran

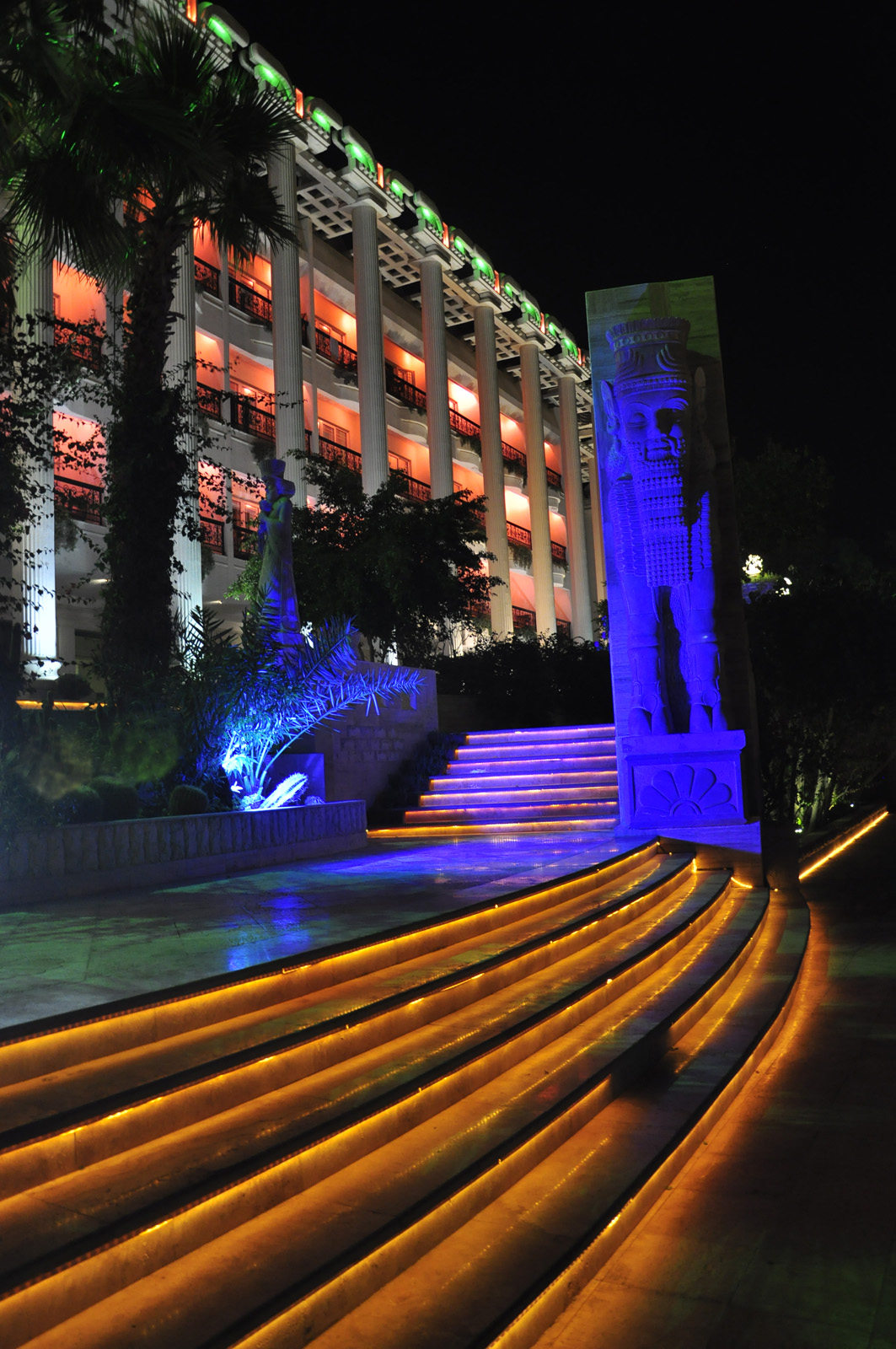
- The Dariush Grand Hotel
- Interactive map of the Dariush Grand Hotel area

General information
- Status: Active
- Type: Hotel, restaurant
- Location: Kish Island, Persian Gulf
- Coordinates: 26.53°N 54.02°E
- Construction started: 1994
- Completed: 2001
- Opening: 2002
- Cost: €185 million
- Owner: Hossein Sabet

Technical details
- Floor count: 4
- Floor area: 20,000 m^{2} (220,000 sq ft)
- Lifts/elevators: 4

Design and construction
- Architecture firm: MCI Group Development (founded by Rez Okhowat)
- Developer: Hossein Sabet; Rez Okhowat
- Structural engineer: MCI Group Development (founded by Rez Okhowat)
- Other designers: Shirin Rashidi (SHIARTCO Luxury Interiors)
- Main contractor: MCI Group Development (founded by Rez Okhowat)

== Establishment ==
Dariush Grand Hotel’s architecture is inspired by Persepolis, reflecting elements of ancient Persian architecture and the Achaemenid Empire of Iran. The hotel was developed by Iranian entrepreneur Hossein Sabet, who previously owned and managed several tourist attractions and hotels in the Canary Islands. The design and construction of the Dariush Grand Hotel were undertaken by MCI Group Development, a UAE‑ and Canada‑based subsidiary of the Lamex Group and the Leandro Iliya Group, founded and owned by Rez Okhowat, with interior design contributions from Shirin Rashidi, founder of SHIARTCO Luxury Interiors. The hotel was completed in 2003 and is currently owned by a consortium of companies.

=== Management ===
On 7 May 2004, it was announced that the Rezidor Hotel Group would manage the Dariush Grand Hotel for ten years, to rebrand the hotel as a Radisson SAS property in the future. The hotel was initially managed under a contract with the Rezidor Hotel Group; however, the agreement was later cancelled in 2006. The general manager at the time was Sascha Kaiser, a German national.

== Gallery ==
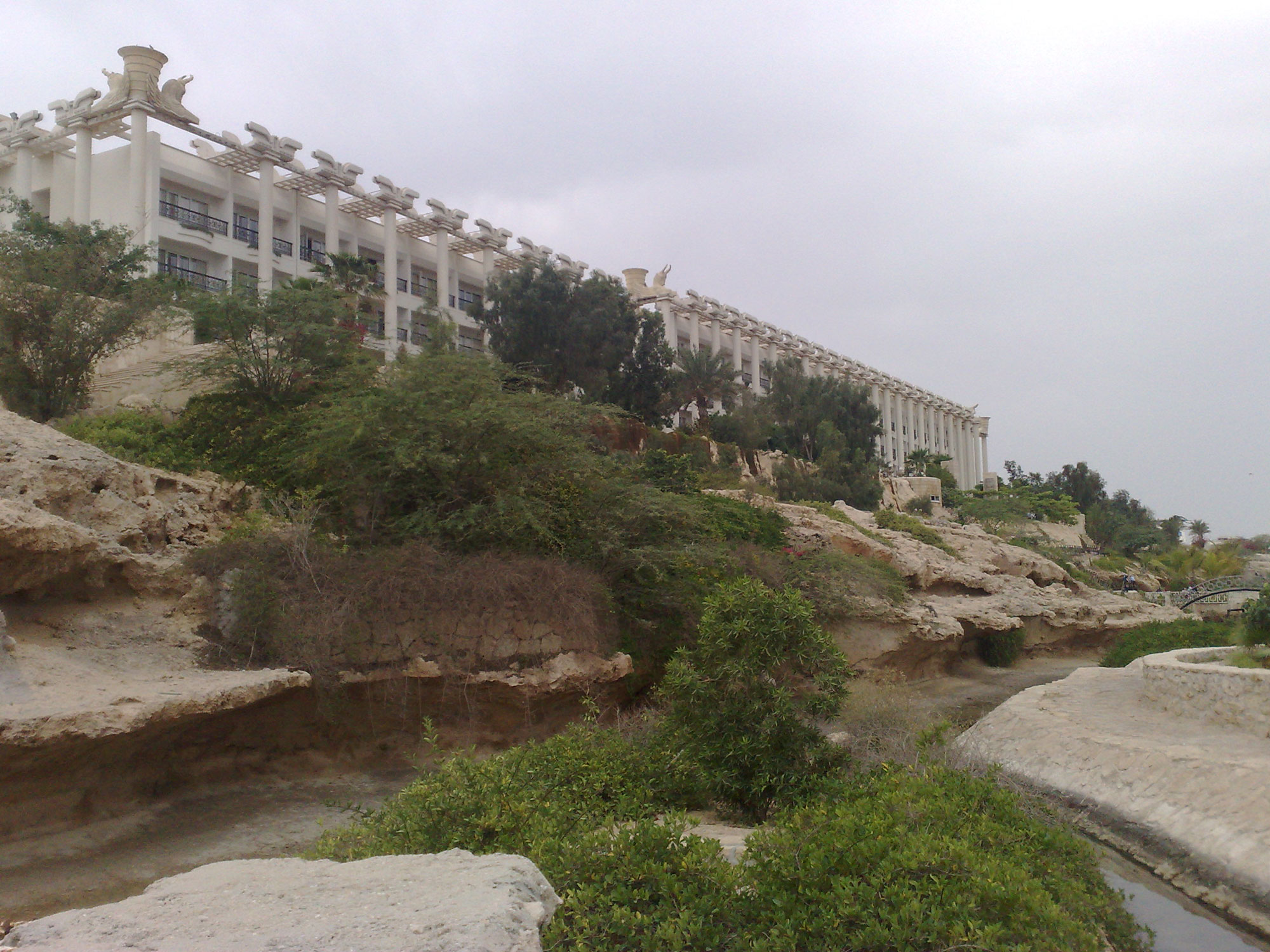

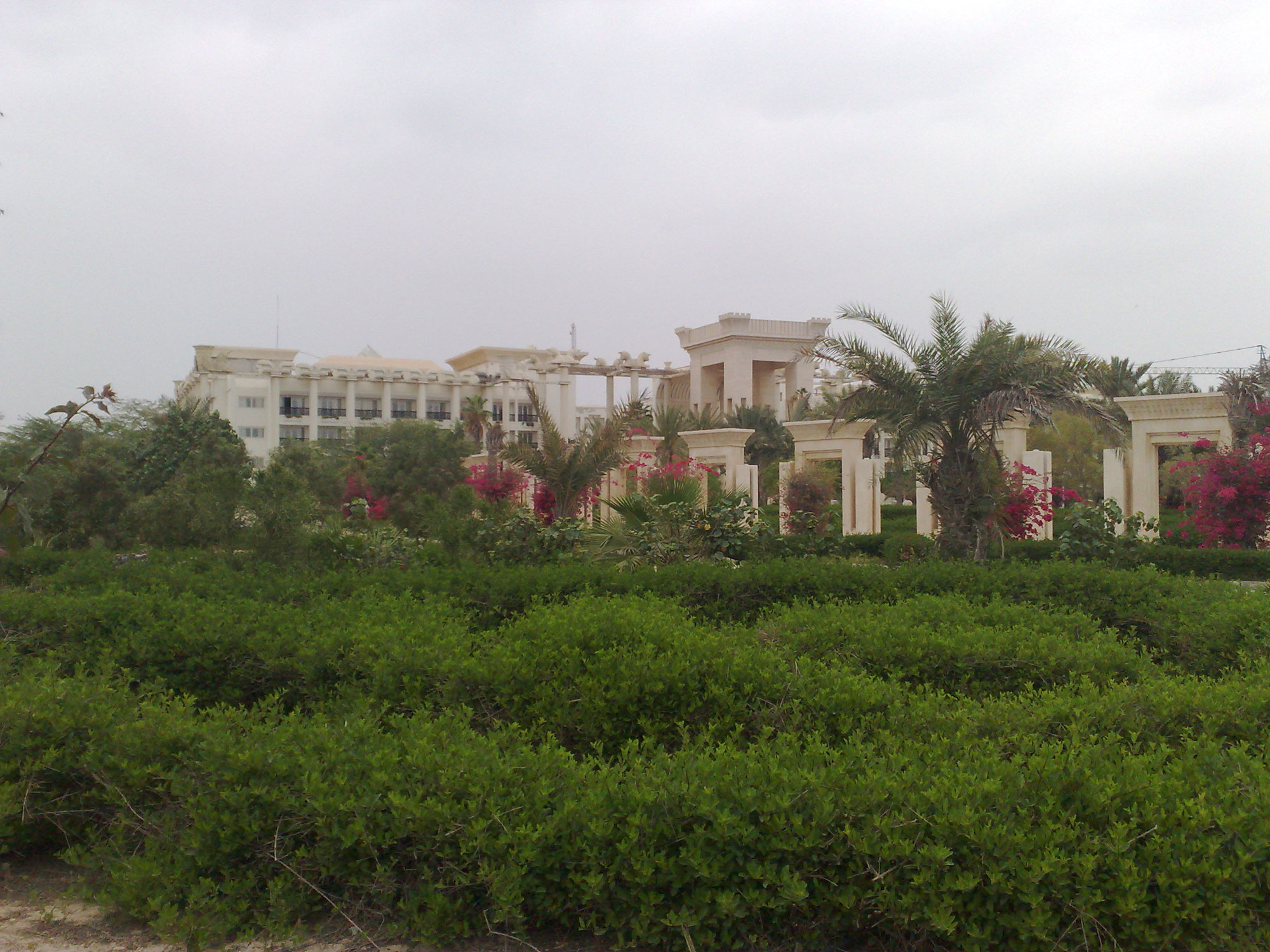

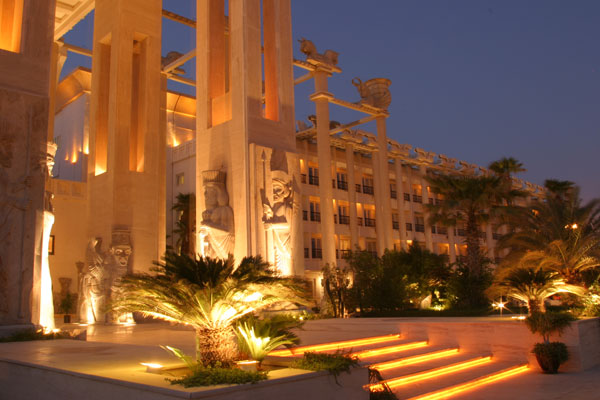

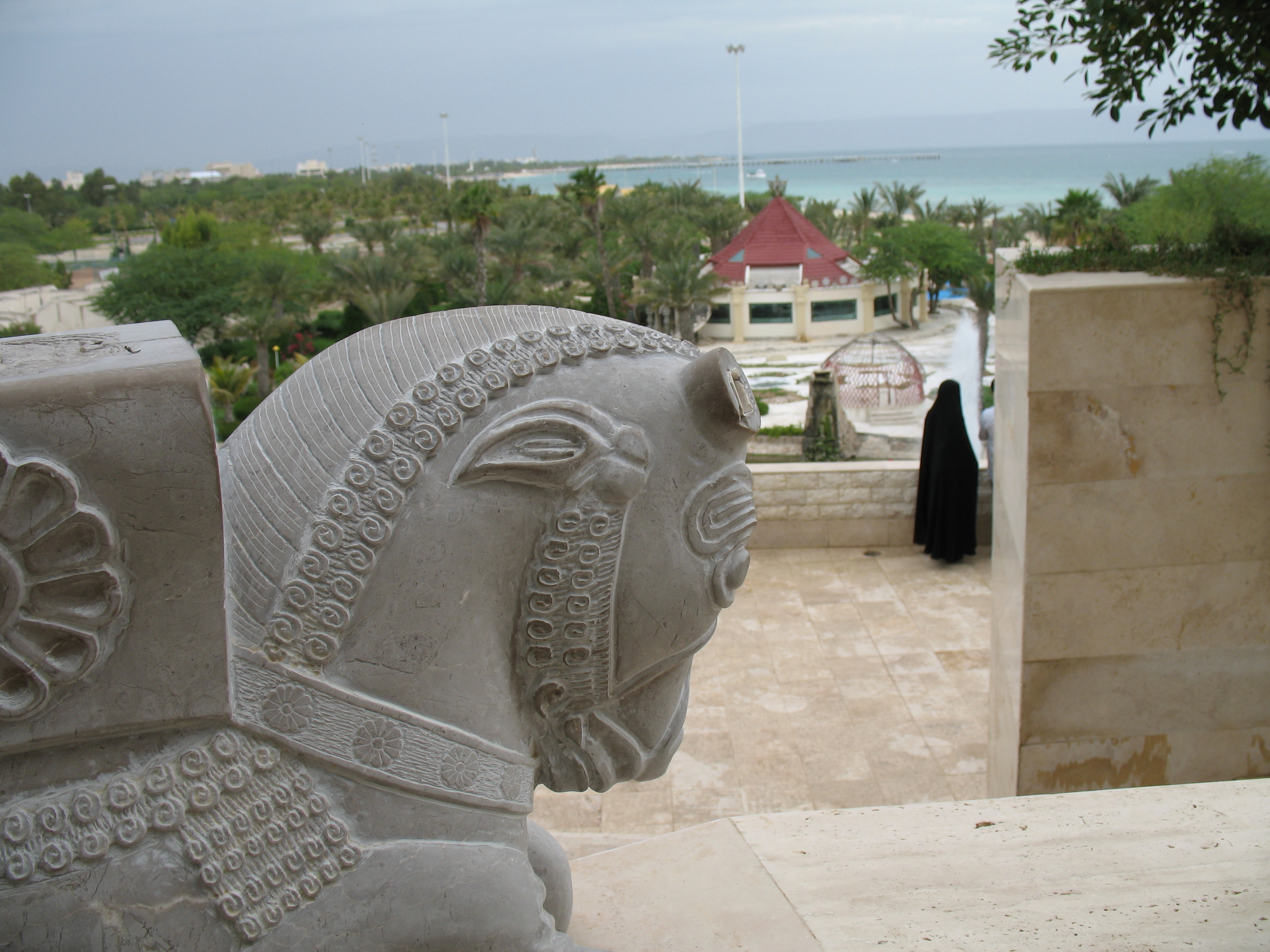
