= Hamid Mosadegh =

Iranian poet, author and lawyer

- حمید مصدق
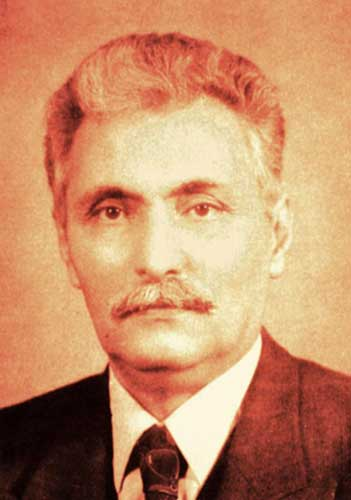
- Born: 31 January 1940; Shahreza, Imperial State of Iran
- Died: 28 November 1998 (aged 58); Tehran, Iran
- Occupations: Professor, poet, lawyer
- Spouse: Laleh Khoshknabi (m. 1972)
- Children: 2

Hamid Mosadegh (Persian: حمید مصدق, January 31, 1940 – 28 November 1998) was an Iranian poet, author and lawyer.

== Biography ==
He was born in Shahreza, a town close to Isfahan, but some time later his family moved to Isfahan, where Mosaddegh completed primary and secondary education. Manochehr Badiee, Houshang Golshiri, Mohammad Hoqouqi (Hoghoughi) and Bahram Sadeghi were Mosaddegh's friends in high school. He established Saeb Literary Association in Isfahan at a young age.

He went to the capital Tehran in 1960, and got his bachelor's degree from the University of Tehran, and his master's degree in Economy. In 1966, he left Iran for continuing education in Great Britain. In 1972, he got his Administrative Law degree from the National University and became an assistant professor at the University of Tehran and Kerman University, teaching several courses in Research Methods. From 1981, he began teaching law, especially Cooperative Law, becoming a faculty member of Law School of University of Tehran and Allameh Tabatabaie University. He was a lawyer of Iranian Administration of Justice, member of the Bar Association and editor in chief of Journal of Association. Besides working as a lawyer, he continued writing poems and publishing some of them.

His career as a lawyer was strongly affected by his life as a poet and his political concerns. Most of his defendants were other Iranian authors and artists, such as Simin Behbahani, another famous Iranian poet.

His most famous book is a collection of his poems during 70s, called "Abi, Khakestari, Siah" (Blue, Gray, and Black). This collection is not just romantic, but also social and political, revealing the emotions, hopes and dreams of Iranian youth during the 70s.

In 1972, he married Laleh Mosaddegh (Khoshknaabi). They have two daughters named Ghazal and Taraneh.

In the words of the critics, one of the distinctive features of his poems is simplicity, fluency and sincerity. As Simin Behbahani argued: "Mosaddegh associated (Iranian's) humanistic goals with poetry." Hamid Mosadegh was close to the heart of Iranian people and his poems are understandable and easy to relate to for people of various ages and classes.

In 1998, he died at Day Hospital in Tehran because of medical complications after a heart attack. He is buried in the "Ghate'ye Honarmandan" (The artists' section) in Tehran.

On his tombstone it has been written: "Remember us, whom in all life's night, Prowl for searching twilight. Remember us kindly and by heart." The words are from one of his last poems in "Shir-e-Sorkh" (the Red Lion) book, which talks mostly with Iranian youth, giving them hope for a better future, asking them to remember those who had worked for a better future in the country but did not make it to see the upcoming bright days.

== Publications ==
- First and long versified "The Kāvīānī Flag" (Derafsh-í Kāvīān)
- Versified of "Blue, Black, Grey" (Ābi, Khākestari, Sīah)
- In the Wind's Passage (Dar Rahgozar-e Baad), 1968
- From Separations (az jodayi-ha), 1979
- The Years of Patience (Saalhay-e Saboori), 1990
- The Crimson Lion (Shīr-í Sorkh), 1997
- ... Until the Release: A Collected Anthology (Tā Rahāyē), 1999
- A Preface to Research Methods
- Collection of Molavi's Quatrain
- Hafez' Sonnets

He has also published other books in the field of Law.
