= Ezzatullah Foladvand =

Iranian writer and translator

Ezzatullah Foladvand عزت‌الله فولادوند
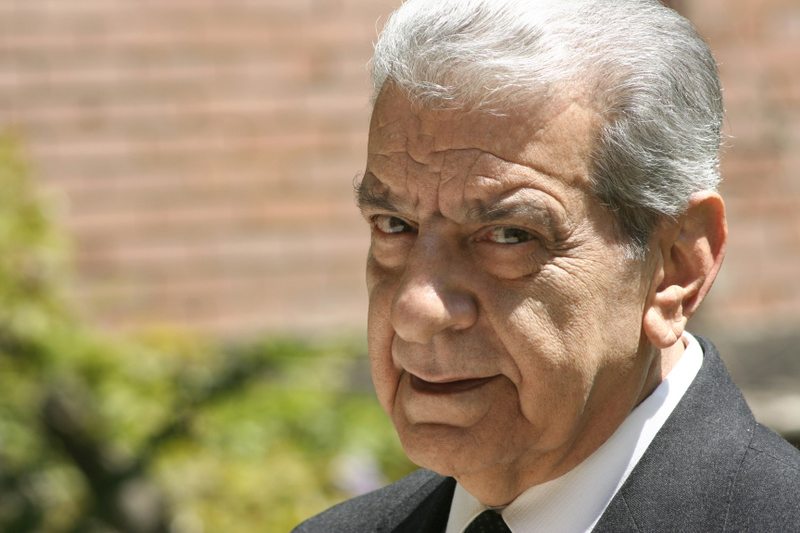
- Born: December 27, 1935 (age 90)
- Education: PhD in philosophy
- Alma mater: Columbia University
- Occupations: Author and translator
- Known for: Translation of important philosophical works into Persian

Ezzatullah Foladvand (Persian: عزت‌الله فولادوند; born December 27, 1935, in Isfahan) is an Iranian writer and translator noted for his adeptness in translating complex philosophical works into Persian.

== Background ==
Ezzatullah Foladvand was born in Isfahan in 1935. His father, Gholamreza Foladvand, served as a judge and held various administrative positions, including governorships in Khuzestan and Fars, as well as the head of the General Registry Office. His grandfather, Azizullah Khan Foladvand, was a respected politician and a member of the National Consultative Assembly.

After completing his primary education in Tehran, Ezzatullah pursued further studies in England. However, due to circumstances, he returned to Iran and completed his secondary education there. He later ventured to Paris, where he studied medicine for two years. However, his encounter with Bertrand Russell's Philosophical Problems led him to shift his focus to philosophy. He then proceeded to the United States to pursue his academic journey in philosophy, obtaining his undergraduate, master's, and doctoral degrees from Columbia University. Notable scholars such as Arthur Danto and Robert Cummings influenced his academic pursuits during this time. From 1964 to 1980, Foladvand held various positions within the National Iranian Oil Company and the Ministry of Economic Affairs and Finance, all while actively participating in cultural endeavors. His translation work flourished during these years, with several of his translations receiving recognition, including Philosophy of Kant and "Consciousness and Society," by H. Stuart Hughes which were selected for inclusion in the eighth and ninth editions of the Islamic Republic of Iran's yearbook, respectively.

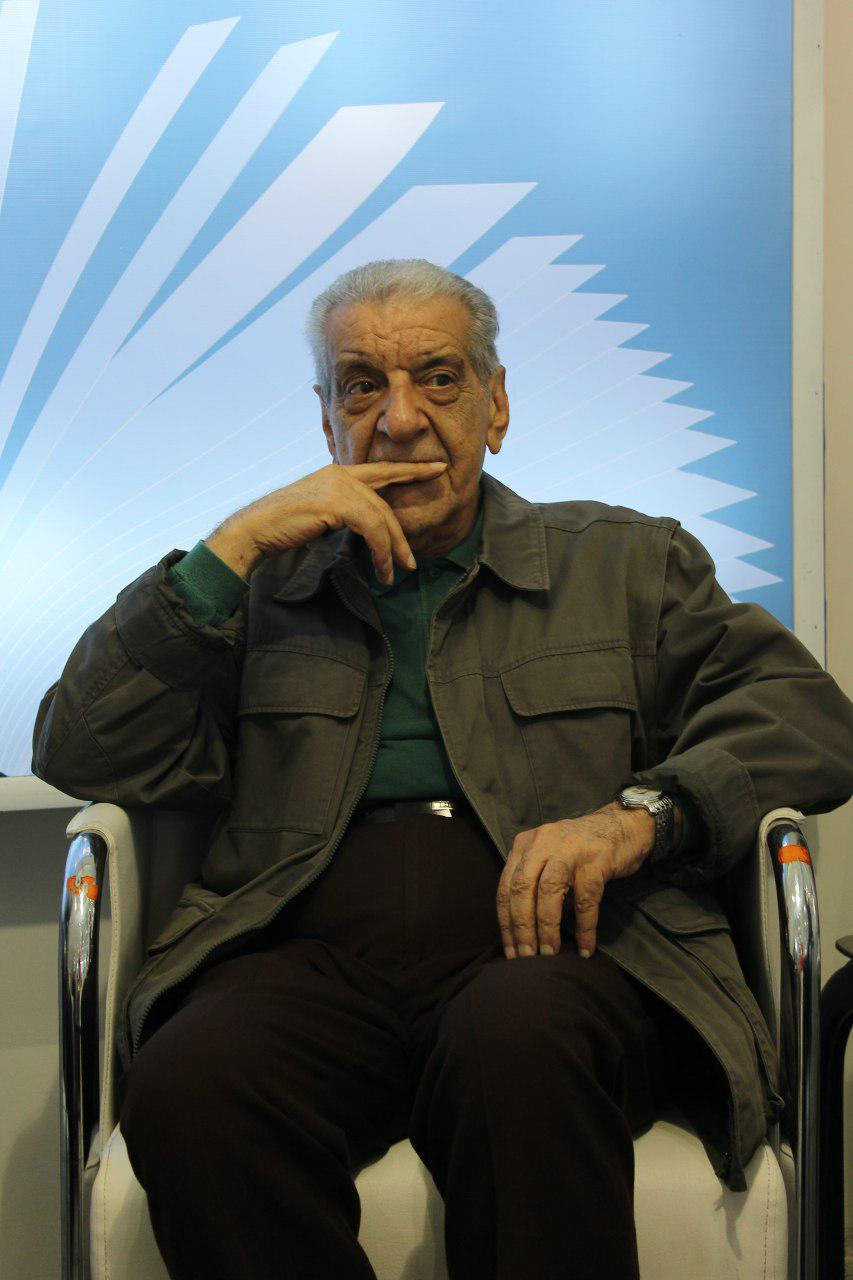
Foladvand at the 30th Tehran International Book Fair, Book House Stand; 8 May 2017

== Foladvand's Views on Translation ==
Foladvand holds strong convictions regarding the art of translation. He emphasizes the importance of fidelity to the original text, advocating for translations that capture the essence and intent of the original author without resorting to ambiguity or embellishment. Despite the challenges inherent in translating philosophical texts, Foladvand asserts that preserving the spirit of the Persian language should remain paramount, drawing attention to the rich tradition of Persian literature and the wealth of linguistic resources available.

He underscores the significance of maintaining the tone of the original text, asserting that deviations can hinder the reader's comprehension and emotional engagement. Foladvand advocates for retranslation when deemed necessary, driven by advancements in language and interpretation.

In selecting works for translation, Foladvand prioritizes texts that he deems significant for his compatriots and personally resonates with. He believes that ignorance or incomplete knowledge often underlie societal challenges and underscores the continuous need for intellectual enrichment through translation.

Foladvand encourages writers and translators to approach their craft with diligence and depth of understanding, cautioning against the indiscriminate use of language trends or foreign influences that may not resonate with the Iranian audience.

He warns against blindly following Western trends in translation, emphasizing the importance of tailoring translations to the needs and cultural context of Iranian readers, rather than solely catering to Western sensibilities.

In essence, Foladvand's approach to translation reflects a commitment to intellectual integrity, linguistic precision, and cultural relevance, ensuring that Persian-speaking audiences have access to nuanced and authentic interpretations of global knowledge and literature.
