= Mahmoud Anbarani =

Iranian poet, writer, scholar

Māhmoud Anbārani
- Born: 1937 (age 88–89) mashhad, Iran
- Known for: poet, writer, translator and scholar

Mahmoud Anbarani (Born in 1937 - Sabzevar - Iran) poet, writer, translator and scholar of Persian (Iran).

== Life ==
He passed his secondary education in city of Sabzevar, and moved to Mashhad in 1953. In 1954, he was accepted in mashhad Medical School entrance, but due to personal problems, he neglected it. In 1964, he was accepted in Dr.Shariati faculty of Literature and humanities, in Mashhad. In the final undergraduate year, ranking first among all students of Mashhad Ferdowsi university Entrance in the Dramatic Arts. He received the scholarship of Nancy, France university but due to family disagreement, he withdrew the trip to France.

Then in 1968, after graduating with a degree in French language and literature, he moved to Isfahan. After graduating in Management Science, he Started working as, head of administration and coordination center of Isfahan Iron foundry.

In 1975 he moved to Tehran and worked in the university of Industrial Training Center (Currently:khaje Nasir-e-din-Toosi University). In posts such as: Assistant and supervisor of Tehranpars-Khak sefid, workships. Then he requested retirement.

He translated a part of the small Larus Dictionary into Persian (Donya publication). He also did the correction of the literary, medical and pharmaceutical parts of the "Human Knowledge" Encyclopedia.

In 1985, he returned to Mashhad and work in the institute of "Islamic Research Foundation", as a researcher, for 17 years. In this period he published many scientific books and manuals.
