= Hossein Sabet =

Iranian businessman

- حسین ثابت
- Born: 1934 (age 90–91); Mashhad, Imperial State of Persia
- Occupation: Businessman

Hossein Sabet Baktash (Persian: حسین ثابت, born 1934 in Mashhad) is an Iranian businessman and Persian carpet dealer. Sabet has a BSc in engineering and resides in Berlin, Germany.

In 1970 he has founded a Hotelkomplex Stella Canarias, located in Jandia on the island Fuerteventura. Stella Canaris was sold in 2000 to the Spanish Hotel Group Dunas. After Dunas declared insolvency Sabet took over the management in 2010. After unpaid bills the Hotel shut down from 2013 to 2016.

In 1981 Sabet bought the Berlin newspaper Der Abend.

Hossein Sabet was the architect and owner of the Dariush Grand Hotel. The project included a Dolphin Park and Birds Garden in Kish Island. In 2014 Sabet sold the project to Seyed Abdoulreza Mousavi.
