= Hajir Darioush =

Iranian film maker (1938–1995)

- هژیر داریوش
- Born: 11 August 1938; Bandar Pahlavi, Iran
- Died: 2 October 1995 (aged 57)

Hajir Darioush (Persian: هژیر داریوش, 11 August 1938, Bandar Pahlavi, Iran – 2 October 1995, Blagnac, France) was an Iranian film maker, described by Javed Jabbar in 1982 as "the leader of the organised progressive Iranian cinema".

Darioush studied cinema at I.D.H.E.C (Institut des Hautes Etudes Cinématographiques) later known as École Nationale Supérieure des Métiers de l'Image et du Son in Paris. After graduation, he married Goli Taraghi, a Persian novelist, and the only daughter of the eminent journalist Lotfollah Taraghi. However, the marriage did not last long.

His first film "Sacred Arena -- گود مقدس", in 1963, was a documentary about the traditional Persian gymnasium. His second film "Serpent's Skin -- جلد مار", made in 1964 was based on D.H. Lawrence's "Lady Chatterley's Lover" featuring Fakhri Khorvash and Jamshid Mashayekhi. It is believed that he started the New Wave of Iranian cinema with this film. He then returned to making two important early social documentaries "But Problems Arose -- ولی افتاد مشکلها" in 1965, dealing with the cultural alienation of Iranian youth, and "Face 75 --چهره 75" a critical look at the westernization of the rural culture, which was a prizewinner at the 1965 Berlin Film Festival. Finally, he made his only commercially successful film, "Bita" in 1972, about a young woman's struggle to come to terms with social barriers, starring Googoosh.

In 1979, he immigrated to France. He was director at the University of Toulouse.

Darioush was the president of the First International Film Festival of Iran in 1966, and acted as artistic director for National Iranian Radio and Television.

== Death ==
He died in 1995 in Toulouse, France.
