= Iraj Nazerian =

Iranian voice actor (1939–2022)

- ایرج ناظریان
- Born: 5 March 1939 tehran, Iran
- Died: 16 March 1992 (aged 53); Stockholm, Sweden
- Occupation: Voice actor

Iraj Nazerian (Persian: ایرج ناظریان; March 15, 1939, in Tehran, Iran – March 16, 1992, in Sweden) was an Iranian dubber who is known for Persian voice-dubbing foreign films.

== Career ==
He is known for dubbing over Orson Welles role as Charles Foster Kane from Citizen Kane and has also dubbed over some of Marlon Brando, Charles Bronson, Gene Hackman, Toshiro Mifune and Lino Ventura's voice roles in films they starred in. He has also dubbed over Davoud Rashidi's role as Six-fingered Mofatesh from the Hezar Dastan.

== Dubbing voice roles ==
Some of Iraj Nazerian's works
Actor	Role	film
Orson Welles	Charles Foster Kane	Citizen Kane
Marlon Brando	Vito Corleone	The Godfather
Gene Hackman	Detective Doyle	French Connection II
Charles Bronson	Most rules	
Lino Ventura	Commissaire Le Goff	The Sicilian Clan
Toshiro Mifune	Washizu Taketoki (Macbeth)	Throne of Blood
Robert Deniro	Mike Vronsky	The Deer Hunter
Sylvester Stallone	Rocky	Rocky II
Gregory Peck	Captain Ahab	Moby Dick
Roger Moore	James Bond	For Your Eyes Only (film)
Charlton Heston	General Charles Gordon	Khartoum (film)
Anthony Quinn	Craig Belden	Last Train from Gun Hill
