= Karim Vessal =

- Scientific career
- Fields: Clinical Research, Molecular Imaging
- Workplaces: Shiraz University of Medical Sciences

Professor Karim Vessal is an Iranian Physician and a pioneer of radiology and nuclear medicine in Iran.

== Biography ==
Karim Vessal (born 1933 in Shiraz, Iran).

== Education ==
He completed his high school education in Iran and then moved on to Austria to continue his education in the University of Vienna. Following earning MD degree, Vessal completed an Internship and Residency at University of Berlin.
