= Habibollah Ashouri =

Iranian politician

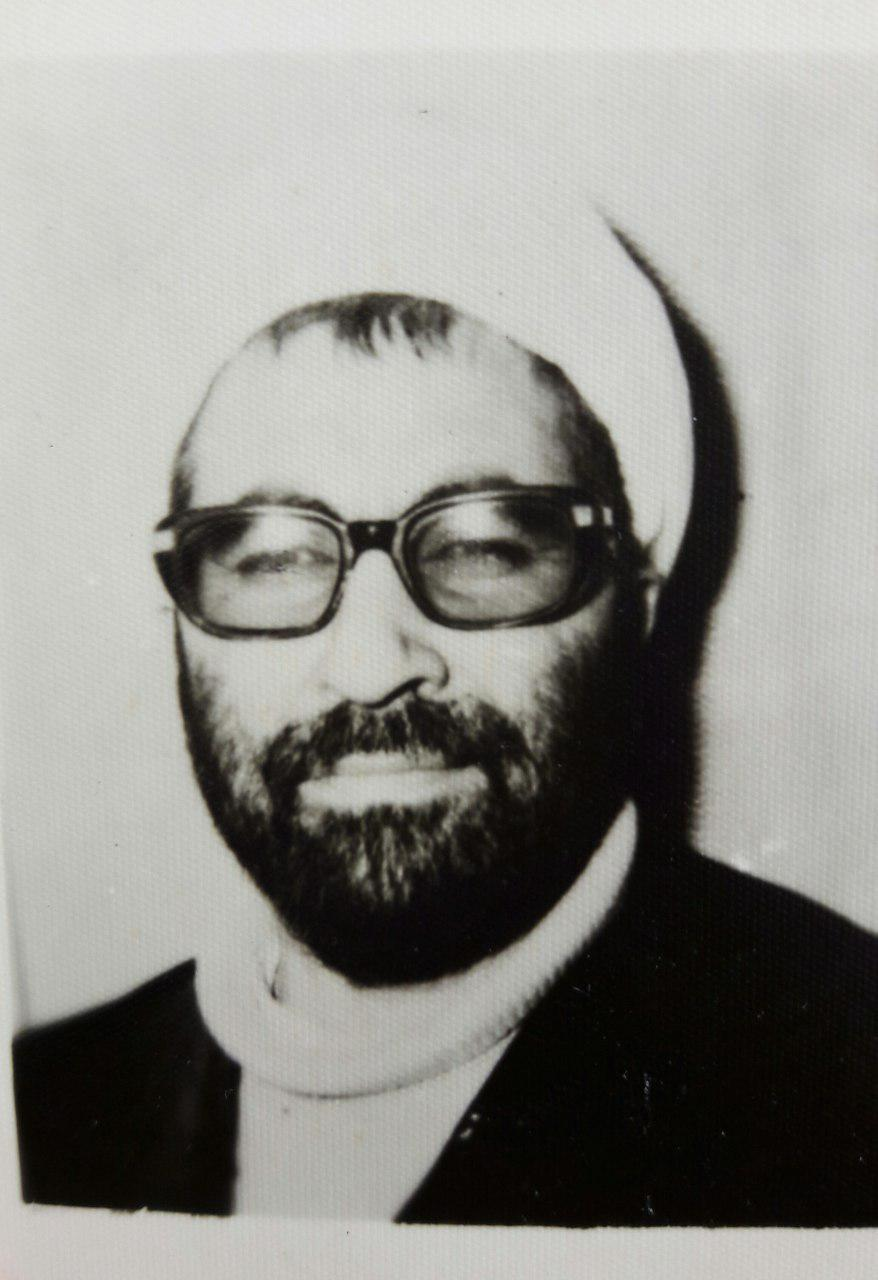
- Died: 18 September 1981; Tehran, Iran
- Cause of death: Execution
- Notable work: Tawhid

Habibollah Ashouri (Persian: حبیب‌الله آشوری) was an Iranian Shia cleric and revolutionary.

Mehdi Khalaji states that before Iranian Revolution, Ashouri was in the inner circle of Ali Khamenei in Mashhad but the two broke up after Ashouri wrote an essay on Monotheism (Tawhid) and Khamenei stated that the essay had plagiarized his lectures. According to Khalaji, the essay used theological principles for elaborating an Islamic vision of classless society.

Ashouri was accused of "apostasy" and subsequently executed in 1981. One of his charges was his heretical beliefs as reflected in Tawhid essay.

According to James A. Bill, he was among "the clerics of moderate persuasion [who] had become the targets of the extremist right".
