= Ahmad Alizadeh =

Iranian politician (1939–2025)

- احمد علیزاده

Member of the Islamic Consultative Assembly
- In office 28 May 1980 – 27 May 1984

Personal details
- Born: 11 October 1939 Savadkuh County, Iran
- Died: 12 December 2025 (aged 86)
- Occupation: Lawyer

Ahmad Alizadeh (Persian: احمد علیزاده; 11 October 1939 – 12 December 2025) was an Iranian politician. He served in the Islamic Consultative Assembly from 1980 to 1984.

Alizadeh died on 12 December 2025, at the age of 86.
