= Goli Taraghi =

Iranian writer

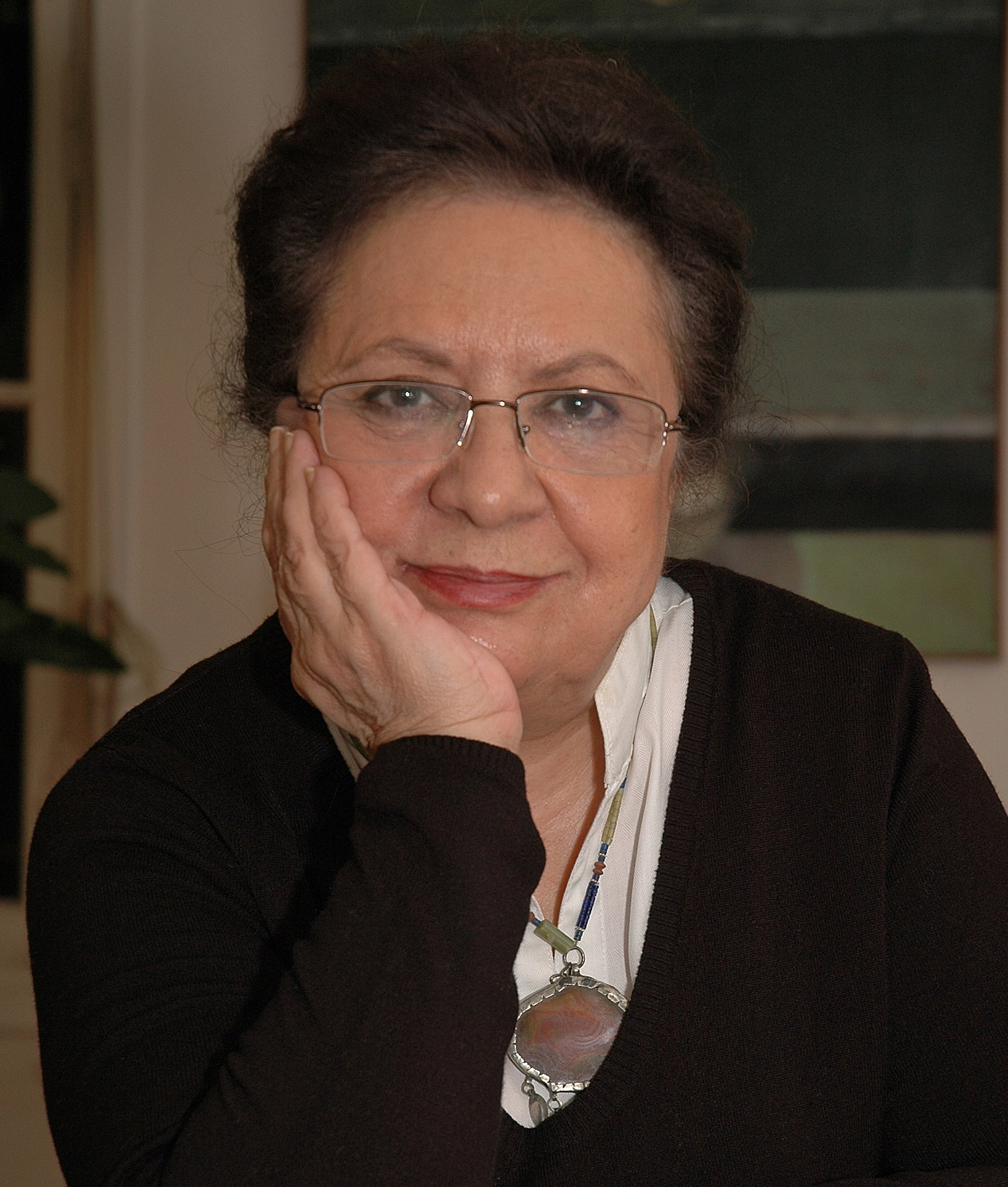
Goli Taraghi in 2017

Zohreh Taraghi-Moghadam, better known as Goli Taraghi (Persian: گلی ترقی) (born 1939) is an Iranian novelist and short story writer.

== Life ==
Goli Taraghi's father Lotfollah Taraghi was a member of parliament, publisher and journalist, and her mother was from a widely cultured family. Born and raised in Tehran, she attended Drake University in the United States, gaining an undergraduate degree in philosophy. Returning to Iran, she obtained a master's degree from Tehran University in 1967 and worked throughout the 1960s as a specialist in international relations for the Plan Organization. In the 1970s she taught courses in philosophy, mythology and symbolism at Tehran University. After the Iranian Revolution the universities were temporarily closed in 1980. Taraghi divorced her husband Hazhir Daryush and moved with her two children to become an ex-patriate in Paris, though she visited Iran throughout the 1980s.

Winter Sleep (1973) a collection of narratives portraying the inner life of eight middle-class city-dwellers, amid the religious dislocation and anomie arising from Iran's rapid modernization in the 1960s. Her short story 'The Great Lady of My Soul' (1982) won the Contre-Ciel Short Story Prize. Scattered Memories (1994) dealt with the emotional fallout from the Iran-Iraq War.

== Works ==
- 1969, "I Too am Che Guevera". Language: Persian [Man Ham Che Gevera Hastam]
- 1973, "Winter Sleep" (i.e. hibernation). Languages: English, Persian [خواب زمستاني] and French ["Sommeil d'hiver"]. Translated by Francine T. Mahak as Winter sleep, Costa Mesa, California: Mazda Publishers, 1994.
- 1990, "Le bus de Shemiran". Languages: French and Persian ["اتوبوس شمیران].
- 1992, A Mansion in the Sky: And Other Short Stories. Languages: English and Persian ["خاطره‌هاي پراكنده: مجموعه قصه"]. Translated by Faridoun Farrokh, Austin, Texas: Centre for Middle Eastern Studies, The University of Texas, 2003.
- 1994, "Scattered Memories". Language: Persian [Khatereh-ha-ye Parakandeh].
- 1994, "Iran Nouvelle". Language: French.
- 1998, "The Pear Tree". Language: Persian with English Subtitles.
- 2001, "جای دیگر". Language: Persian.
- 2004, "The Three Maids". Language: French ["Les Trois bonnes"].
- 2004, "The Wolf Lady". A short story in a collection. Language: Persian ["مادام گرگه"].
- 2004, "Critical Study of Goli Taraghi’s Works". Language: English and Persian ["بررسی و نقد آثار گلی ترقی"].
- 2007, "30 Years of Solitude". Language: English.
- 2007, "Getting Past the Censors", retrieved 2019-12-08. Radio Interview. Language: English.
- 2007, "Iran is my Demolished Homeland". Language: English. Interview.
- "Stories by Satyajit Ray and Iranian Writer Goli Taraghi, Presented by Theatre Nisha". hindu.com. 2008. Archived from the original on September 26, 2008.. Language: English. Play.
- 2009, "In Search of the Self". Language: French ["Chroniqueuse de la Quête de Soi"]. Interview.
- 2010, "Between Two Worlds: Goli Taraghi Accepts the Bita Prize". The Boston Review: Interview/Lecture. Language: English.
- 2010, "The Gentleman Thief". Short story review. Language: English.
- 2011, "Time and Space in the House of Shemiran". Language: French ["Nostalgie, Temps et Espace Dans La Maison de Shemiran"].
- 2012, "The Grand Lady of My Soul". Short story. Language: English.
- 2011, "The House Of Shemiran". Languages: French ["La Maison de Shemiran"] and Persian ("خانه شمیران").
- 2013, "Looking at the works of Goli Taraghi". Language: French ["Regard sur l’œuvre de Goli Taraghi"]. Review of Literature.
- 2013, "Postmodern Influence in Contemporary Persian Literature]". Article - Theory and Practice in Language Studies. Language: English.
- "The Hamid and Christina Moghadam Program in Iranian Studies and The Abbasi Program in Islamic Studies". Stanford: Persian Course Description. iTunes. Language: English and Persian.
- "The Pomegranate Lady and Her Sons". Language: English. Short story.
- "The Neighbor". Language: English. Short story.
