= Reza Vohdani =

Iranian musician

Reza Vohdani (1933 in Tehran – 2003) was an Iranian musician.

Reza learned classical Persian music from masters such as Vaziri, Shahnazi, Saba, Mehrtash and Khaleghi. He himself taught classical Persian music at his private music school, while working for the Iranian Art and culture ministry (Vezarat Farhang va Honar). Many famous Iranian composers and entertainers were taught by him.

In 1997 he published the collection of old Iranian songs known as Radife haft dastgah Agha Hoseingholi.
