= Mongashti Amirian =

Iranian weightlifter (1936–2021)

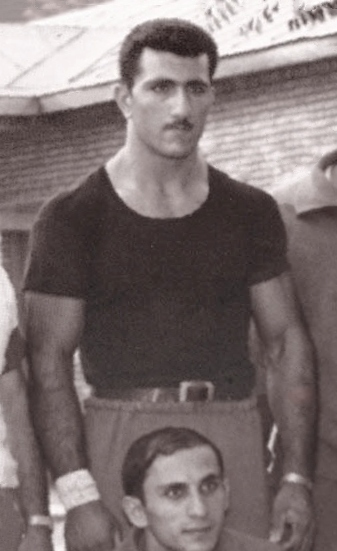
- Amirian in 1960

Personal information
- Born: 3 February 1936 Haftkel, Iran
- Died: 29 April 2021 (aged 85)
- Height: 178 cm (5 ft 10 in)
- Weight: 82 kg (181 lb)

Sport
- Sport: Weightlifting

Mongashti Amirian (Persian: منگشتی امیریان, 3 February 1936 – 29 April 2021) was an Iranian light-heavyweight weightlifter. He placed tenth at the 1960 Summer Olympics.
