= Nasrollah Nasehpour =

Nasrollah Nasehpour Persian: نصرالله ناصح‌پور
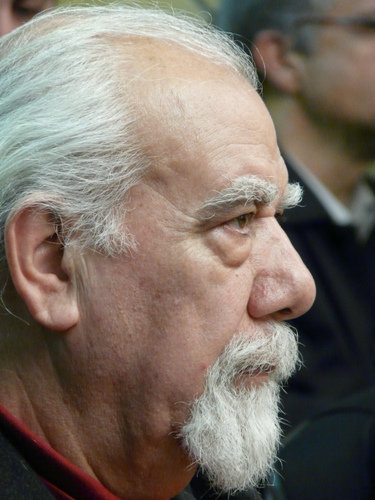
- Nasehpour in 2009

Background information
- Born: 24 October 1940; Ardabil, Iran
- Origin: Iranian Azerbaijanis
- Died: 18 June 2023 (aged 82)
- Genres: Iranian music
- Occupation(s): Singer, composer
- Instrument: Radif

Nasrollah Nasehpour (Persian: نصرالله ناصح‌پور, 24 October 1940 – 18 June 2023) was an Iranian-Azerbaijani master musician in the Radif genre of music. Nasehpour was member of Iranian House music and professor in the Tehran University of Art.

Nasehpour was born in Ardabil on 24 October 1940. He died on 18 June 2023, at the age of 82.
