= Artem Ohandjanian =

Austrian-Armenian historian

Artem Ohandjanian is an Austrian-Armenian historian and documentalist, Honorary Doctor of Sciences Academy of Armenia. He is the deputy head of the "Franz Werfel Committee" (Austria).

Since 1982 he worked at Austrian state archives and in 1995 published Armenia-related documents and materials of 1872-1936 in 12 volumes.

He is the author of "1915: The Forgotten Genocide" (1989, Vienna) which was translated and published in different languages. He also authored works called "Franz Werfel and the 40 Days of Musa Dagh" and "The Armenian Question, Austro-Hungary and Germany", published by the Armenian Genocide Museum-Institute in German.

He is an author of about 70 films that mainly refer to Armenian history and culture. He was the prize-winner of 6 international film festivals. The latest award he received in Chicago, 2001 for his film dedicated to Sergei Parajanov.
