= Mehdi Bahadori =

Iranian academic

- مهدی بهادری‌نژاد
- Born: 1933 (age 92–93); Tehran

Mehdi N. Bahadori (Persian: مهدی بهادری‌نژاد) (born 1933, Tehran) is a professor of mechanical engineering at Sharif University of Technology. His research specialties include solar energy applications and passive cooling of buildings.

== Education ==
Bahadori got his Bachelor of Science degree from the University of Tehran in 1956; his Master of Science degree from the University of Wisconsin–Madison in 1959; and his PhD from the University of Illinois at Urbana–Champaign in 1964.

== Bibliography ==
Publications by Bahadori include:

Books

- Sayigh, A.A.M.; Bahadori, Mehdi N. (1979). Solar Energy Application in Buildings. Academic Press. ISBN 0-12-620860-3.
- Bahdori, Mehdi N. (1999). Love to Be Happy: The Secrets of Sustainable Joy. Blue Dolphin Publishing. ISBN 0-931892-71-6.
- Bahdori, Mehdi N. (1988). The University of Life. Blue Dolphin Publishing. ISBN 0-931892-70-8.

Articles

- Bahadori, Mehdi N. (2005). "Solar Desalination for Domestic Applications". Water Conservation, Reuse, and Recycling: Proceedings of an Iranian-American Workshop. Washington, DC: National Academies Press, c2005. ISBN 0-309-09293-0.
