= Zahra Mostafavi Khomeini =

Iranian politician, Ruhollah Khomeini's daughter (born 1940)

- زهرا مصطفوی خمینی
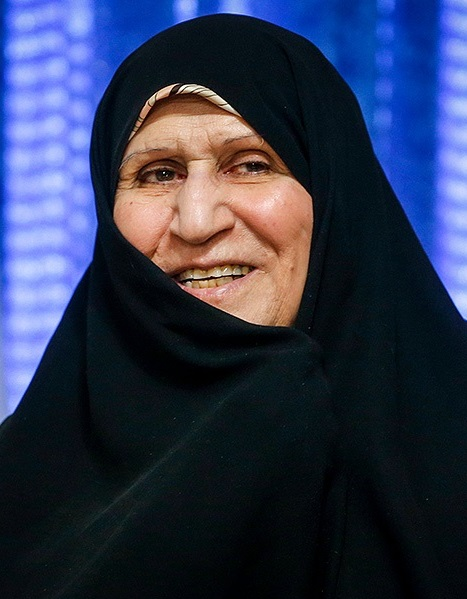
- Mostafavi in 2018
- Born: 13 November 1940 (age 85); Tehran, Imperial State of Iran
- Spouse: Mahmoud Boroujerdi (m. 1962; died 2010)
- Children: 2
- Relatives: Ruhollah Khomeini (father); Khadijeh Saqafi (mother)

Sayyida Zahra Mostafavi Khomeini (Persian: زهرا مصطفوی خمینی; born 13 November 1940) is an Iranian politician and educator. The daughter of Ruhollah Khomeini, the leader of the Iranian Revolution and subsequent Supreme Leader of Iran, Mostafavi was awarded a PhD in philosophy from the University of Tehran, where she subsequently taught. Mostafavi has been called the "most prominent" of Khomeini's three daughters, and has become a prominent supporter of women's rights in Iran in addition to Palestinian causes.

== Political positions ==
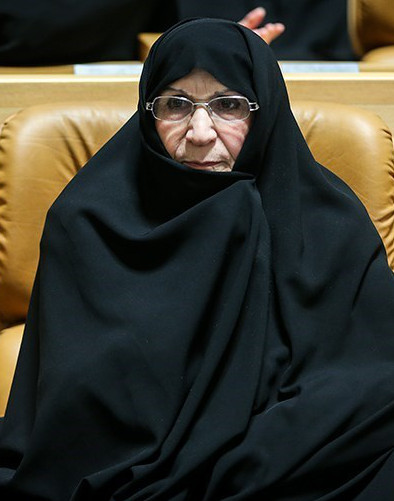
In the conference of "Commemoration of the Lady of the Islamic Republic", April 2015

=== Women's rights ===
Mostafavi has spoken out in favour of women wearing the hijab, stating it "immunises them from abuse and protects families... if men know there is no question of anything outside the family, they will be more loyal to their wives". She also supports women having the equal right alongside men to enter the fields of politics, academics, and education. Mostafavi serves as Secretary General of the Association of the Women of the Islamic Republic, an organisation advocating for women's participation in Iranian politics.

=== Ayatollah Khomeini ===
Mostafavi has publicly praised her father and in particular his stance on women's rights, stating his wish for women to play a "full part" in Iranian society and never demanded that her mother do chores on his behalf.

=== Iran–United States relations ===
Mostafavi has demonstrated a hardline approach on relations between Iran and the United States, saying in 2009 she was "not interested in negotiations with the US".

=== 2009 presidential election ===
In the contested 2009 Iranian presidential election, Mostafavi was reported to have endorsed Mir-Hossein Mousavi. The election was ultimately won by Mahmoud Ahmadinejad.

=== Israel–Palestine conflict ===
Mostafavi is a proponent of Palestinian statehood and has warned against Iran normalising relations with Israel. She is also proactive in Palestinian causes, serving as the leader of the Iran-based Society for Defending the Palestinian Nation.

=== 2013 presidential election ===
Following the exclusion of former president Akbar Hashemi Rafsanjani from standing in the 2013 Iranian presidential election by the Guardian Council, Mostafavi wrote a public letter to her father's successor as Supreme Leader, Ali Khamenei, urging for Rafsanjani's reinstatement as a candidate to prevent the formation of a dictatorship. The decision was upheld, and the election was ultimately won by Hassan Rouhani.
