= Andisheh TV =

Iranian-language television channel

- Type: Television network
- Country: United States

History
- Launched: June 9, 2006

Andisheh TV (ATV) is a 24-hour television station based in Woodland Hills, Los Angeles, California, founded and launched in June 2006. ATV broadcasts in Persian, via the Hotbird satellite, and Eutelsat satellite to Iran, the Middle East, and Europe. The station was also widely viewed in Afghanistan and Tajikistan where there are large Persian-speaking populations.

ATV featured news, political, informational, economic, and business updates, current daily affairs, weekly opinions and analysis breakdowns from worldwide subject matter experts, and various special broadcasts and educational programs with a line-up of locally produced shows.
