= Shahrzad (Reza Kamal) =

Iranian dramatist amd playwright (1898–1937)

Reza Kamal (Persian: رضا کمال; 1898 – 11 September 1937), better known by the pseudonym Shahrzad or Scheherazade, was an Iranian dramatist and playwright. He was born in Tehran, Qajar Iran.

From his childhood he liked One Thousand and One Nights and its storyteller Scheherazade and was to choose Shahrzad as his nickname years later. He studied French language and literature in École Saint-Louis in Tehran. An interest in French literature resulted in his translating some French plays into Persian during those years and then he started to adapt plays, to write some original plays and to direct some of his own plays.

Since he lived under a very repressive government with a very restrictive censorship, he usually used historical and mythical characters and stories to talk about his times. An important characteristic of his plays was using female characters as his main characters. He committed suicide on 11 September 1937, the same year as several friends' suicides in what is said to have been a suicide pact.

== Some of his plays ==
- Parichehr and Parizad operetta (1920)
- Zoroaster (1920)
- Doctor Has Come Back (1924)
- Alabaster Statues (1929)
- Thousand and First Night
- Queen for One Night (1932)
