= Lotfollah Taraghi =

Iranian journalist and writer

Lotfollah Taraghi (Persian: لطف‌الله ترقی), born 1903 [1282 SH] in Qom, Iran, and died in 1973 [1352 SH] in Tehran, Iran, was an Iranian scholar (adib), journalist, publisher, lawyer, and legislative drafting officer. He is best known for his historical romance short story collection Naseroddin Shah's Love-Affairs, which inspired the television series Jeyran. He is the father of the Iranian author Goli Taraghi.

== Career as journalist ==
Lotfollah Taraghi was a well-known landowner, and in the 1940s he owned most of the Mahmoodieh area in Tehran. He was patriotic in political orientation and has been described as one of the five most famous Iranian journalists during the 1941–57 period. In 1929, he launched a social and literary journal, Taraghi ("Progress"), and continued as its director and chief editor until its closure in 1965. He also founded and edited the literary journal Āsiā-ye javān (Young Asia) for some time.

== Historical fiction writings ==
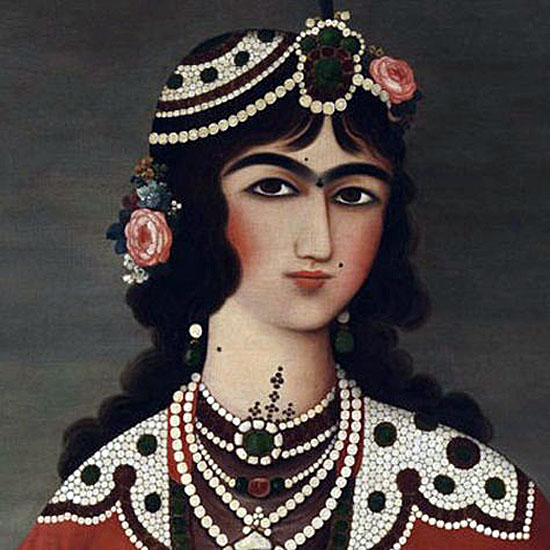
Jeyran. Illustration on the book cover of the first edition of Naseroddin Shah's Love-Affairs (1960)

Lotfollah Taraghi had a deep interest in historical novels and stories. He is primarily known for his popular short story collection Naseroddin Shah's Love-Affairs ('Eshqbāzihā-ye Nāseroddin Shāh), which depicts life in the harem of the Qajar king Naseroddin Shah. The stories focus on Jeyran, the king's first mistress and later his favorite wife.

Taraghi's book Naseroddin Shah's Love-Affairs ('Eshqbāzihā-ye Nāseroddin Shāh) provided the inspiration for the Iranian historical romance television series Jeyran (جیران, 2022), written and directed by Hassan Fathi.

== Selected works ==
- The Djinn in the Hamam of Sangalaj (Jenn dar hammām-e Sangalaj) (1928)
- The Indian Lady (Bānu-ye hendi) (1930)
- Baghdad Nights: Harun al-Rashid's Love for the Daughter of the Iranian General Azarin (Shab-hā-ye Baghdād: Deldādegi-ye Hārun be doxtar-e Āzarin sardār-e irāni) (2 vols.) (1952)
- Naseroddin Shah's Love-Affairs ('Eshqbāzihā-ye Nāseroddin Shāh) (1960). Re-published several times as Jeyran and the Secrets of Naseroddin Shah's Harem (Jeyrān va asrār-e haramsarā-ye Nāseroddin Shāh)
