= Abdul Majid Arfaei =

Iranian researcher and Elamitologist (1939–2026)

- عبدالمجید ارفعی
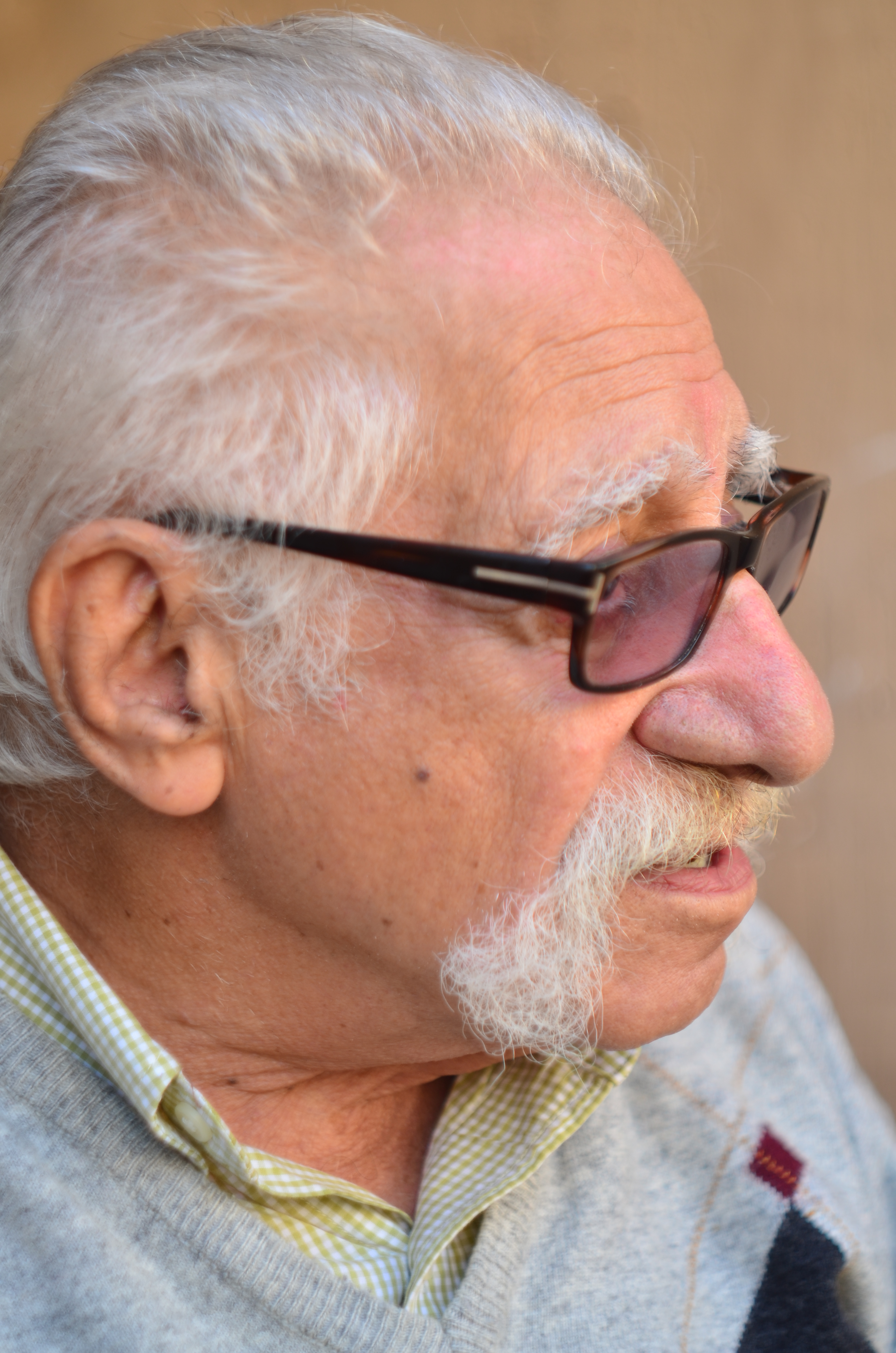
- Born: 1 September 1939; Bandar Abbas, Hormozgan Province, Iran
- Died: 25 February 2026 (aged 86); Tehran, Iran
- Other name: Hakha
- Known for: Researcher, author, elamitologist
- Spouse: Mah Sima Fattahi

Abdul Majid Arfaei or Abdul Majid Arfaee (Persian: عبدالمجید ارفعی; 1 September 1939 – 25 February 2026) was an Iranian researcher and elamitologist. He finished translating 647 tablets, related to the era of Darius the Great, which were read by Richard Hallock. The works are included in the first volume of the series.

Arfaei, Elamologist and Assyriologist, was a professor of the University of Chicago. The late professor, who had read the bulk of the Persepolis Elamite tablets, died in 1980. Arfaei, the renowned expert of Elamite, Avestan and Pahlavi languages, was the founder of the Inscriptions Hall of Iran's National Museum and wrote a number of books on Iranian history. The Iranian expert also translated more than 2,500 Persepolis inscriptions, which are housed at the University of Chicago. In Iran, the Cyrus Cylinder was translated into Persian, by Arfaei for the first time.

Arfaei died on 25 February 2026, at the age of 86.
