= Khosrow Shakeri Zand =

Iranian historian, translator and activist (1938–2015)

- Born: Khosrow Shakeri Zand; July 3, 1938; Tehran, Iran
- Died: 30 June 2015 (aged 76); Paris, France
- Occupations: Scholar, Historian, Human Rights Activist

Khosrow Shakeri Zand (Persian خسرو شاکری زند), also known under his pen name Cosroe Chaqueri (July 3, 1938 – June 30, 2015) was a historian, researcher, writer and activist of the Human Rights movement of Iran.

== Biography ==
Khosrow Shakeri Zand was born in Tehran on July 3, 1938. He was the second child from a family of six children. His father was the first Persian rug exporter to Europe and his mother was one of the first women to have higher education, and was a school teacher. He finished his early education at Alborz College in Tehran. He then decided to move to California and study at the San Francisco State University where he obtained his B.A. in economics in 1961. He continued his education there and received his master's degree in the same field in 1964. He then moved to Paris, France in 1973 and completed his PhD in history at Sorbonne in 1980.

== Activities and publications ==
During his student years, from 1960 to 1970's, Khosrow became an active member of the Human Rights Movement of Iran. He published a series of historical papers on Iran's 20th-century history. 23 volumes of this series are in Persian and 10 of them are in European languages. Since he was fluent in English, French, German, Persian and Russian, he was able to translate many classical works into Persian. His publications include the following:

- The Russo-Caucasian Origins of the Iranian Left. Social Democracy Modern Iran, Curzon Press, London, 2000; Univ. of Washington Press and Univ. of British Columbia Press, Seattle and Vancouver, 2001, 400 pp.
- Armenians of Iran: The Paradoxical Role of a Minority in a Dominant Culture, Harvard University Center for Middle East Studies Monograph Series, Harvard University Press, Cambridge (MASS), Jan. 1998, 410 pp.
- The Soviet Socialist Republic of Iran, 1920-1921: Birth of the Trauma, Pittsburgh University Press, Pittsburgh, 1995, 650 pp.
- Beginning Politics: The Reproductive Cycle of Children's Tales and Games in Iran, Lewiston (NY) 1992, new edition, 1996, 263 pp.
- Un Prince iranien rouge en France. Oeuvres et vie de Iradj Eskandari, vol. I, Mazdak/Antidote, Florence/Tehran, 2002

== Career ==
- Mazdak Publications, Florence, Italy, general editor, 1969–78;
- Tehran University, Iran, assistant professor of economics, 1979–80;
- Ecole des Hautes Etudes en Sciences Sociales, Paris, France, lecturer and associate professor of history, 1982–85, lecturer and research fellow, 1998-;
- Woodrow Wilson International Center for Scholars, Kennan Institute for Advanced Russian Studies, Washington, DC, resident scholar, 1986, research scholar, 1987–88;
- University of California, Los Angeles, visiting scholar at Center for Near Eastern Studies, 1986, visiting associate professor of history, 1987;
- Harvard University, Center for Middle Eastern Studies, Cambridge, MA, visiting scholar and research fellow, 1988–91, senior research fellow, 1992–94, 1996-;
- University of Chicago, IL, visiting scholar at Center for Middle Eastern Studies, 1991;
- DePaul University, Chicago, visiting associate professor of history, 1991–92;
- Columbia University, Center for Iranian Studies, NYC, assistant editor, Encyclopaedia Iranica, 1994–96;
- University of Paris III, Sorbonne Nouvelle, lecturer in modern Iranian history, 1977–80.

== Political views ==
Dr. Shakeri Zand had socialist views. During the whole of his life, he strived to educate young people about the history and politics of Iran. He was diligent in his work aiming at establishing democracy and Human Rights in Iran.

== Bibliography ==
- Beginning Politics in the Reproductive Cycle of Children's Tales and Games in Iran: An Historical Inquiry Hardcover – January, 1993
- The Left in Iran 1905-1940 Nov 1, 2011
- The Left in Iran 1941-1957 Nov 1, 2011
- Origins of Social Democracy in Modern Iran, May 2001
- The Soviet Socialist Republic of Iran, 1920-1921: Birth of the Trauma (Series in Russian and East European Studies), Aug 1995
- The Armenians of Iran: The Paradoxical Role of a Minority in a Dominant Culture, Articles and Documents (Harvard) Aug 1, 1998
- Beginning Politics in the Reproductive Cycle of Children's Tales and Games in Iran An Historical Inquiry, 1992
