= Noureddin Razavi Sarvestani =

- Born: Seyyed Noureddin Razavi Sarvestani; April 11, 1935; Sarvestan, Fars province, Iran
- Died: April 27, 2000 (aged 65); Shiraz, Iran
- Occupation: Singer
- Musical career
- Genres: Persian Pop; Persian Traditional
- Instrument: Vocals
- Years active: 1958–2000

Noureddin Razavi Sarvestani (Persian: نورالدین رضوی سروستانی; April 11, 1935 – April 27, 2000) was an Iranian vocalist of Persian classical and pop music. One of his notable students is Reza Shirmarz who is more active in theater and book industries.

== See also ==
- Music of Iran
- Persian pop music
