= Manouchehr Esmaeili =

Iranian voice actor (1939–2022)

- منوچهر اسماعیلی
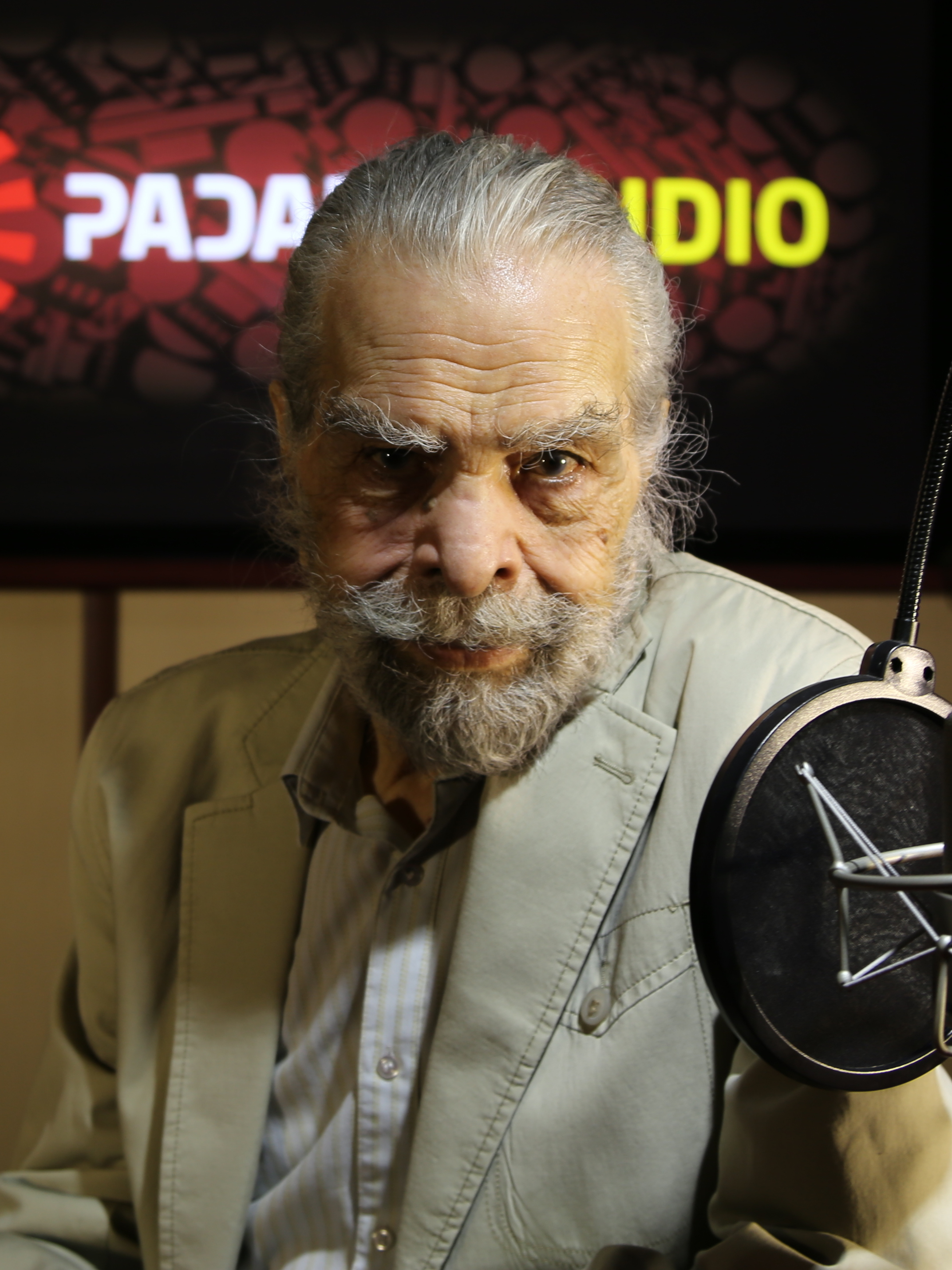
- Esmaeili in 2021
- Born: 28 March 1939; Kermanshah, Iran
- Died: 22 August 2022 (aged 83); Tehran, Iran
- Occupation: Voice actor

Manouchehr Esmaeili (Persian: منوچهر اسماعیلی; b. 28 March 1939 – d. 22 August 2022) was an Iranian voice actor. He was perhaps best known for dubbing Frank Sinatra in the 1960 film Ocean's 11. He also dubbed Peter Falk's title character in Columbo, Falk, Terry-Thomas and Buddy Hackett in It's a Mad, Mad, Mad, Mad World, and Sidney Poitier and Rod Steiger in In the Heat of the Night.

== Biography ==
Esmaeili was born in Kermanshah on 28 March 1929. He dubbed in over 200 American films and television programs on lead and supporting roles.

=== Death ===
He died on 22 August 2022 at his home due to complications from COVID-19, at the age of 83.
