= Mahmoud Khoshnam =

Persian music critic (1935–2021)

Mahmoud Khoshnam (Persian: محمود خوشنام, Iran, 27 April 1935 – 14 March 2021) was an Iranian music critic. He was the editor of Music Review magazine in the years 1960–1963.

== Biography ==
He studied political sciences at the University of Tehran and continued his studies in sociology in Germany and Austria.

He taught literature at the Persian National Music Conservatory in Tehran and was the editor of Roudaky Monthly for five years.

From 1960 he was the editor of Music Review magazine (Majale-ye Musighi) in Tehran. Khoshnam shortly was the head of Roudaki Hall public relations section.

In 1980 he moved to West Germany. In following years he cooperated with Deutsche Welle and BBC Persian Service. His main programs were focused on Persian folk and pop music.

A selection of Khoshnam articles/interviews was published in Sweden in 1998 titled "In the Field of Music" [dar Ghalamro'e Musighi].
