= Janet Mikhaili =

Iranian illustrator

- Born: 1936; Tehran, Iran
- Died: 1 September 2006 (aged 69–70)
- Education: University of Tehran
- Occupation: Illustrator

Janet Mikhaili (Persian: ژانت میخائیلی; 1936 – 1 September 2006) was an Iranian illustrator who worked on children's books and magazines.

== Biography ==
She was born in 1936 in Tehran and educated at Anoushirvan Dadgar High School. Her father was an architect. Having been encouraged by her family and having painted since childhood, she painted after graduating high school, and she later studied at the University of Tehran College of Fine Arts, under Ali-Mohammad Heydarian.

She started working as an illustrator with her work at Peyk magazine, where her work also included the Nowruz edition, before stepping down in the early-1990s after her mother fell ill. She also worked at Rushd magazine from 1968 to 1995, including as a designer and illustrator. After the Iranian revolution, she lived in the United States for a few months in the early-1980s, but returned to Iran.

She also illustrated books aimed at children and young adults, as well as several poetry books, primary school textbooks, and Nowruz packages, her illustrated books include The Celebration of Buds, A Hundred Ruby Seeds, More Beautiful than Spring, The Sound of an Instrument Comes, and Three Steps Away from Mother, while her textbook work includes Nowruz assignments. By the end of her career, she had spent thirty years as an illustrator.

In April 2004, an exhibition of her work was held at the Iranian Artists Forum. She was also a featured illustrator at the Ministry of Culture and Islamic Guidance illustration biennial and a featured artist at the Fifth Periodic Exhibition of Children's Book Illustrators. Among her accolades were a career appreciation plaque in 1995, as well as an Institute for the Intellectual Development of Children and Young Adults award for Three Steps Away from Mother. She was also nominated for the Astrid Lindgren Memorial Award, but was not considered as a winner due to her death; only living people may win the award.

Mikhaili died on 1 September 2006. Mikhaili, who lived alone, reportedly lacked health insurance, and only got medical expenses payment after Hossein Saffar Harandi learned about her illness. Her funeral was in Eslamshahr, and she is interred at Doulab Cemetery.
