= Rouben Galichian =

Rouben Galichian (Armenian: Ռուբեն Գալչյան; born 30 November, 1938, Tabriz) is an independent London-based scholar and researcher specializing in historical maps of Armenia and the South Caucasus region.

Rouben Galichian has published many books and articles on the history and cartography of the Caucasus. His first book entitled "Historic Maps of Armenia. The Cartographic Heritage" (2004), which presents a collection of world maps and maps of the Caucasus over a period of 2600 years, became a bestseller in 2005. His articles have appeared in various cartographic magazines, journals and periodicals, among them Imago Mundi and the IMCoS Journal. He has lectured extensively in Armenia, USA, Iran, UK and France.

His book entitled "The Invention of History: Azerbaijan, Armenia and the Showcasing of Imagination" (2009/2010) documents the culture and history of Nagorno-Karabakh through the centuries. His next work, "Clash of Histories in the South Caucasus" delves into the details and reasons of Azerbaijani historical and cultural falsifications, based mainly on Arab, Persian, Azerbaijani and Western sources, as well as analyzing 45 old maps, which form part of the international cartographic heritage.

His later works include volumes on the history of the Armenian cartography, history of Karabagh in European maps and works addressing paradoxes created by Azerbaijan and Turkey relating to the history, cartography and the culture of the region. All of his books are first published in English, followed by an Armenian version and in many cases are also translated to Russian, Persian and even Turkish. He has also published many articles in various periodicals as well as lecturing and delivering presentations in related subjects.

For his services to Armenian historical cartography Galichian was awarded an honorary doctorate by the National Academy of Sciences of Armenia in 2008. In 2009 he was the recipient of Armenia's Vazgen I Cultural Achievements Medal. In 2013 he was the recipient of "Movses Khorenatsi" Presidential Medal for his services to the Armenia-Diaspora relations and Armenian culture.

== Selected bibliography ==
=== Books ===
- Historic Maps of Armenia. The Cartographic Heritage London: IB Tauris, 2004. ISBN 978-1-86064-979-0 or 1-86064-979-3 Held by 164 WorldCat libraries. WorldCat
- Hayastaně hamashkharhayin kʻartēzagrutʻean mēj = Armenii︠a︡ v mirovoĭ kartografii (Armenia in World Cartography) (in Armenian and Russian) Yerevan: Printinfo Art Books, 2005. ISBN 978-99941-957-4-9 WorldCat
- Countries South of the Caucasus in Medieval Maps. Armenia, Georgia and Azerbaijan London: Gomidas Institute and Yerevan: Printinfo Art Books, 2007. ISBN 978-1-903656-69-3 or 1-903656-69-9 Worldcat
- The Invention of History: Azerbaijan, Armenia and the Showcasing of Imagination Gomidas Institute and Yerevan: Printinfo Art Books, 2009. First edition. ISBN 978-1-903656-86-0 WorldCat. Translated to Russian, Armenian and Persian.
- Clash of Histories in the South Caucasus: Redrawing the Map of Azerbaijan, Armenia and Iran.ISBN 978-1-908755-01-8. (Translated to Russian and Persian).
- Historic Maps of Armenia. The Cartographic Heritage. Abridged and Revised London: Bennett and Bloom, 2015.ISBN 978-1-908755-20-9.
- A Glance into the History of Armenia through Cartographic Records London: Bennett and Bloom, 2015. ISBN 978-1-908755-26-1.
- "A Medieval Armenian T-O Map" (Article). Imago Mundi 60:1. London: January 2008. 86–92.
- History of the Armenian Cartography up to the year 1918 London: Bennett and Bloom, 2017, ISBN 978-1-908755-29-2. WorldCat
- Armenia, Azerbaijan and Turkey. Addressing Paradoxes of Culture, Geography and History. London, Bennett & Bloom, July 2019. ISBN 978-1-908755-35-3.
- The Borders of Armenia during 2600 Years of History Yerevan, Zangak, October 2022. ISBN 978-9939-68-982-1.
