= Leyly Matine-Daftary =

Iranian artist (1937–2007)

- Born: 1937; Tehran, Imperial State of Iran
- Died: 17 April 2007 (aged 69–70); Paris, France
- Education: Cheltenham Ladies' College, Slade School of Fine Art
- Style: Modernist
- Father: Ahmad Matin-Daftari

Leyly Matine-Daftary (Persian: لیلی متین‌دفتری; 1937–2007) was an Iranian modernist artist and art educator. She was based in both Tehran and Paris. Matine-Daftary was best known for her flat paintings that highlighted simplicity but still expressed emotions.

== Biography ==
Marzieh Leyly Matine-Daftary was born on 19 January 1937 in Tehran, Imperial State of Iran (now known as Iran). The only daughter of Ahmad Matin-Daftari and Mansoureh Mossadegh, her mother was the daughter of the Prime Minister of Iran, Mohammad Mossadegh and Zia al-Saltaneh.

Matine-Daftarys paternal grandparents were Showkat ad-Dowleh and Mirza Mahmud-Khan Ain ul-Mamalek. Because Showkat ad-Dowleh was the half-sister of Mossadegh, Matine-Daftarys parents were first cousins. Matine-Daftarys father was thrown in prison after the Anglo-Soviet invasion of Iran by the Allies in 1941 because of his German connections.

In 1953, Matine-Daftarys grandfather, Mossadegh, was deposed in a coup d'état.

Matine-Daftary was a close friend of Empress Farah Diba. There was a family connection because the third marriage of great-grand grandmother Najm al-Saltaneh of Matine-Daftary had been to a Diba.

== Education ==
After completing her elementary education in Tehran, Matine-Daftary was at the age of ten sent to England where she attended Cheltenham Ladies' College. She obtained a Fine Arts degree from the Slade School of Fine Art before returning to Tehran in the late 1950s.

== Artistic career ==
From 1956 until 1960, Matine-Daftary lectured on sculpture and sculpting at the Fine Arts Faculty of Tehran University. Matine-Daftary was involved in the early Tehran Biennial and in the Shiraz Arts Festival, for which she created iconic identifying materials.

== Marriage ==
In 1961, Matine-Daftary married her first cousin twice removed, Kaveh Farmanfarmaian, (son of Abdol-Hossein Farman Farma). Farmanfarmaian was a business man and the founder of a number of corporations, such as Bank of Industry and Mining.

The couple had two children, a son and a daughter before divorcing.

After her divorce Matine-Daftary divided her time between Paris and her house in the Ferdows Gardens, in Tehran.

== Death ==
Matine-Daftary died in Paris on 17 April 2007.

== Exhibitions ==
- 2016, "20th Century Art/Middle East", part of Middle East Art Week, Dubai International Financial Centre (DIFC), Dubai
- 2013 – 2014, "Iran Modern", Asia Society, New York City
- 1974 – 1975, "Exhibition of the Contemporary Iranian Art collection of Farah Pahlavi" - (traveling) Tehran, Islamabad, Delhi, Istanbul, Ankara, Belgrade, Moscow, London and Paris
- 1973, Salon d’Automne, Paris Palais des Beaux Arts, Brussels, Belgium
- 1968, "International Festival of Arts", Shiraz Modern Iranian Art and Columbia University, New York City, New York
- 1967, ”25 Years of Modern Iranian Art”, Tehran Museum, Tehran, Iran
- 1966, Tehran Biennale, Iranian Pavilion, Official Selection, Tehran, Iran
- 1962, Tehran Biennale, Iranian Pavilion, Official Selection, Tehran, Iran

== See also ==
- List of Iranian artists
- List of Iranian painters
- List of Iranian women artists
