= Fereydoun Tonekaboni =

Iranian satirist and storyteller (1937–2024)

- فریدون تنکابنی
- Born: 10 September 1937; Tehran, Iran
- Died: 28 September 2024 (aged 87); Cologne, North Rhine-Westphalia, Germany
- Occupations: Writer and satirist
- Known for: Being one of the most well-known satirists in Iran
- Political party: Tudeh Party of Iran

Fereydoun Tonekaboni (Persian: فریدون تنکابنی; 10 September 1937 – 28 September 2024) was an Iranian satirist and storyteller.

== Biography ==
Fereydoun Tonekaboni was born in a cultural family in Tehran. His father was a school principal, and his mother was a teacher. After completing his education, he became a teacher of Persian language and literature. In 1961, he published his first story titled A Man in a Cage (fa) with a romantic tone. He then collaborated with Iranian literary publications, and his writings leaned more towards satire. In 1969, Tonekaboni was a member of the Writers' Association of Iran and participated in some of its sessions advocating for freedom of expression. After the revolution and the crackdown on members and supporters of the party, he went into hiding in 1983 and eventually fled the country.

Tonekaboni faced a challenging journey and reached West Germany, where he lived in Cologne for several years. Fereydoun Tonekaboni gained numerous readers, especially for his political satire from the late 1960s to the end of the 1970s. Among the eighteen books he published, "Notes of the Busy City," "Dark Night Stars," and "The Sorrow of Being a Column" are more widely known. He continued his press activities abroad, publishing his writings in various newspapers or in the form of books.

Tonekaboni died in Cologne, North Rhine-Westphalia, Germany on 28 September 2024, at the age of 87.

== Expulsion from the Iranian Writers' Association ==
In 1979, the board of directors of the Iranian Writers' Association, consisting of Baqer Parham (fa), Ahmad Shamlou, Mohsen Yalfani (fa), Gholam-Hossein Sa'edi, and Esmail Khoi, decided to expel Fereydoun Tonekaboni, Mahmoud Etemadzadeh, Siavash Kasrai, Houshang Ebtehaj, and Boroumand. This decision was eventually approved by the general assembly of the Iranian Writers' Association, leading to the expulsion of all Tudeh elements, along with these five individuals, from the association.
