= Azartash Azarnoosh =

Iranian academic (1938–2021)

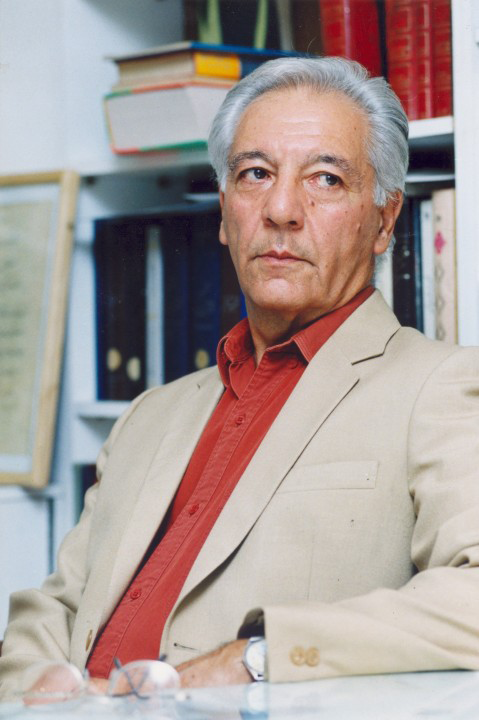
Azartash Azarnoush

Azartash Azarnoush (Persian: آذرتاش آذرنوش, 18 February 1938 – 7 October 2021) was a linguist and scholar of Iran. Born in Qom, he held two Ph.D. degrees from France. He specialized in Arabic literature. Azarnoush was part of Imam Sadeq University and Tarbiat Modarres University faculty, and was the director of the Arabic department of The Center for the Great Islamic Encyclopedia in Tehran since 1986, and published over 200 articles in the field of Arabic literature, as well as a few dozen books.

== Selected publications ==
- "A guide to the influence of Persian language in Arabic language" (Persian: کتاب راهنمای نفوذ فارسی در فرهنگ و زبان تازی)
- "A history of Arabic language and culture" (تاریخ زبان و فرهنگ عربی)
- "A contemporary dictionary of Arabic to Persian" (فرهنگ معاصر عربی به فارسی), which won a Best book award in Iran in 1999.
- Elements de religions iraniens chez les Arabes à l'époque préislamique, 1976.
- Chalesh-e Mian-e Arabi va Farsi: Sadeha-ye Nokhost (Struggles between Arabic and Persian: Early Centuries)). Ney. 2006. p. 402. ISBN 978-964-185-042-7.
