= Lutfullah Khairkhwa =

Afghan politician and columnist

Lutfullah Khairkhwa لطف الله خیرخواه

Deputy Minister of Higher Education
- Incumbent
- Assumed office 21 September 2021 (Note: Acting: 21 September 2021 – 15 August 2025)
- Minister: Abdul Baqi Haqqani
- Supreme Leader: Hibatullah Akhundzada
- Prime Minister: Hasan Akhund

Personal details
- Education: Master's in Tafsir
- Alma mater: International Islamic University, Islamabad
- Occupation: Politician, Taliban member

Lutfullah Khairkhwa (Pashto: دوکتور لطف الله خیرخواه) is a politician in Afghanistan and a columnist. He is currently serving as Deputy Minister of Higher Education in Afghanistan.

He received a master's degree in tafsir from the Faculty of Islamic Studies, International Islamic University, Islamabad.

== See also ==
- Politics of Afghanistan
