= Taher Sabahi =

Iranian-born art dealer, journalist and author

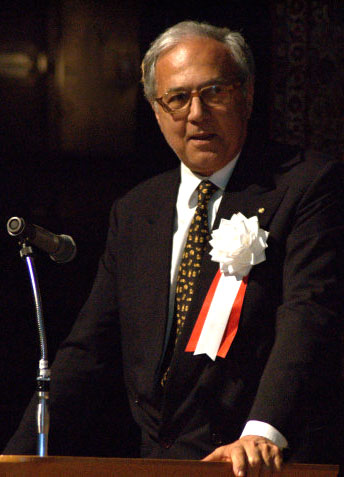
- Born: July 21, 1940 (age 86); Tehran, Iran
- Education: Bologna University Turin University
- Years active: 1963 – present
- Website: www.taher-sabahi.org

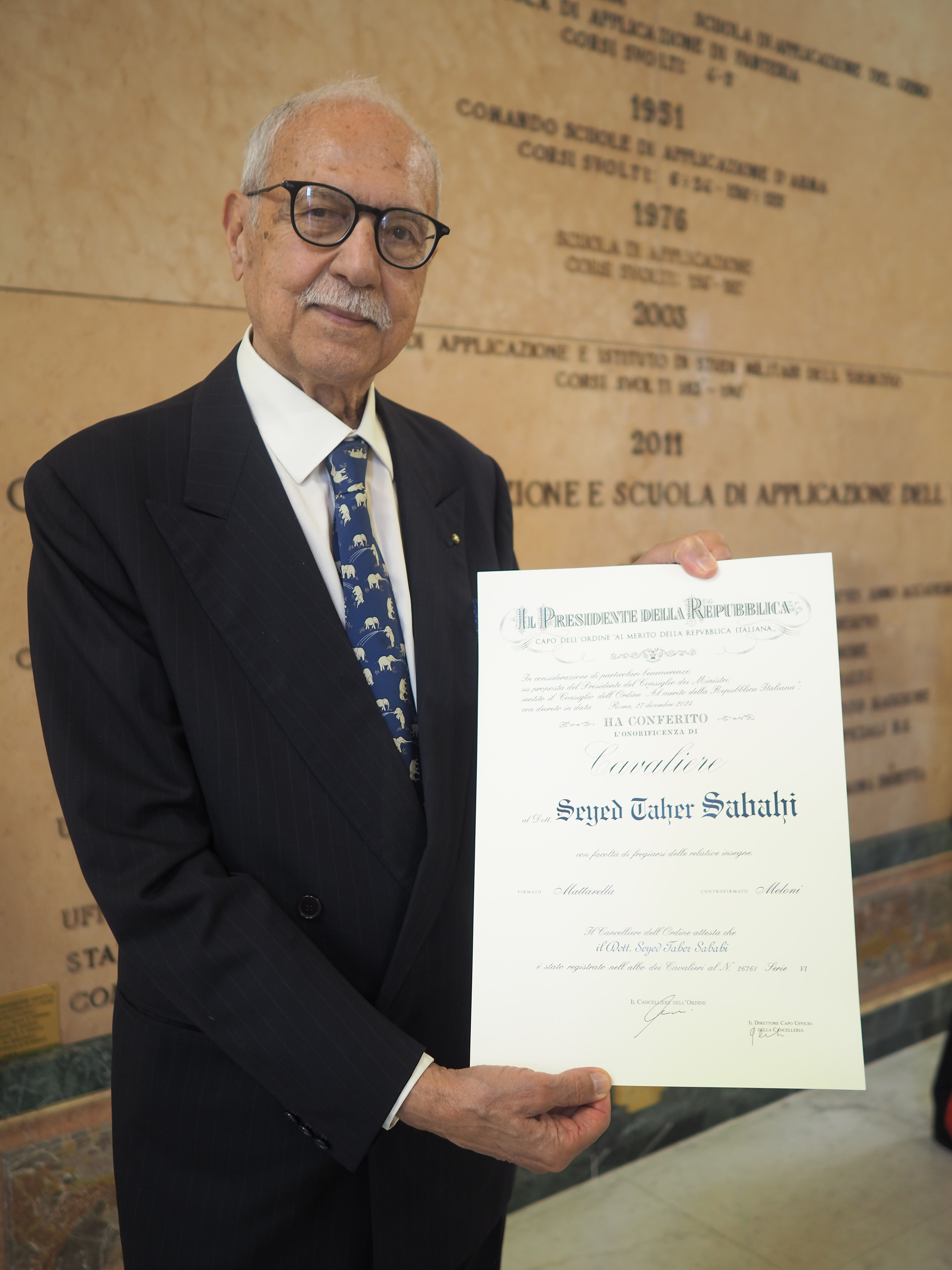
Cavalier Dr. Seyyed Taher Sabahi

Seyed Taher Sabahi (born July 21, 1940) is an Iranian-born art dealer, journalist, author and lecturer born in Tehran.

Besides being a carpet dealer in Turin since 1961, in 1993 Taher Sabahi founded the quarterly magazine Ghereh, International Carpet & Textile Review, a quarterly magazine published in English and Italian. Since then he has been the editor of the magazine, and he has also been active in the publishing world, writing many books on carpets.

== Life ==
Born in Tehran to an Iranian Azerbaijan family, Sabahi moved to Rome in September 1961. Sabahi attended medical school in the University of Bologna's Faculty of Pharmacy.

From December 2024 he was awarded by the title of “Knight of the Order of Merit of the Italian Republic”.

== Bibliography ==
Sabahi has written over twenty books about Iranian Carpets, some of these are listed below

- Tappeti d’oriente, arte e tradizione. De Agostini, Novara 1986
- Splendeurs du tapis d’orient. Atlas, Paris 1987
- Vaghireh. Modelli per la tessitura dei tappeti. Karta, Firenze 1987
- ABC del tappeto orientale. De Agostini, Novara 1989
- Qashqai. Tappeti tribali persiani. De Agostini, Novara 1989
- Kilim. Tappeti piani del Caucaso. De Agostini, Novara 1990
- Orienttepiche. Battenberg Verlag, Augsburg 1992
- Sumak. Tappeti piani a trama avvolta. De Luca, Roma 1992
- Tülü. Tappeti a pelo lungo dell’Anatolia centrale. CATO, Torino 1997
- Kerman.Cinque secoli di tappeti. Capricorno, Torino 2005
- L’arte del tappeto d’oriente. Electa – Mondadori, Milano 2007
- Kilim. Electa – Mondadori, Milano 2011
- RoyalHunt. The Medallion Rug of the Poldi Pezzzoli Museum, Milan. (English-Italian) 2020
- Qalin. Story and Art of rug weaving in Orient. (Persian) Published in two volumes, by Gooya house of culture and art, Tehran
- Qali e Iran. Persian Carpets. (Persian – English) Published by Gooya, Tehran.
- Kilim, Story and Art of flat weaving in Orient. (Persian) Published by Vijeh Nashr, Tehran
- Savarane Shargh – Knights of the Orient. (Persian – English) Published by Gooya, Tehran
- Shahsavan. (Persian – English) Published by Vijeh Nashr, Tehran
- Qashqai. (Persian – English) Published by Gooya, Tehran
- Kerman – Five Centuries of Carpets weaving in Kerman. (Persian – English) Published by Matn
- “Farhanghestane Honar”, Tehran
- Cavalieri d’oriente. De Luca, Milano 1991
- Samarcanda. Tappeti della via della seta. Rumor, Vicenza 1995
- Cina. Tappeti antichi del celeste impero. Bolis Spa, Bergamo 1998
- Shahsavan Jajim. Musumeci editore, Aosta 1998
- Anatolia. “quivi si fanno li sovrani tappeti del mondo più begli”. Rumor, Vicenza 2000
- Tibet. Rugs of the Roof of the World. Ghereh publications, Torino 2001
- Royal Hunt, the medallion rug of the Poldi-Pezzoli Museum, Milano. Tehran 2024
