= Ahmad Matin-Daftari =

Prime Minister of Iran (1897–1971)

- احمد متین‌دفتری
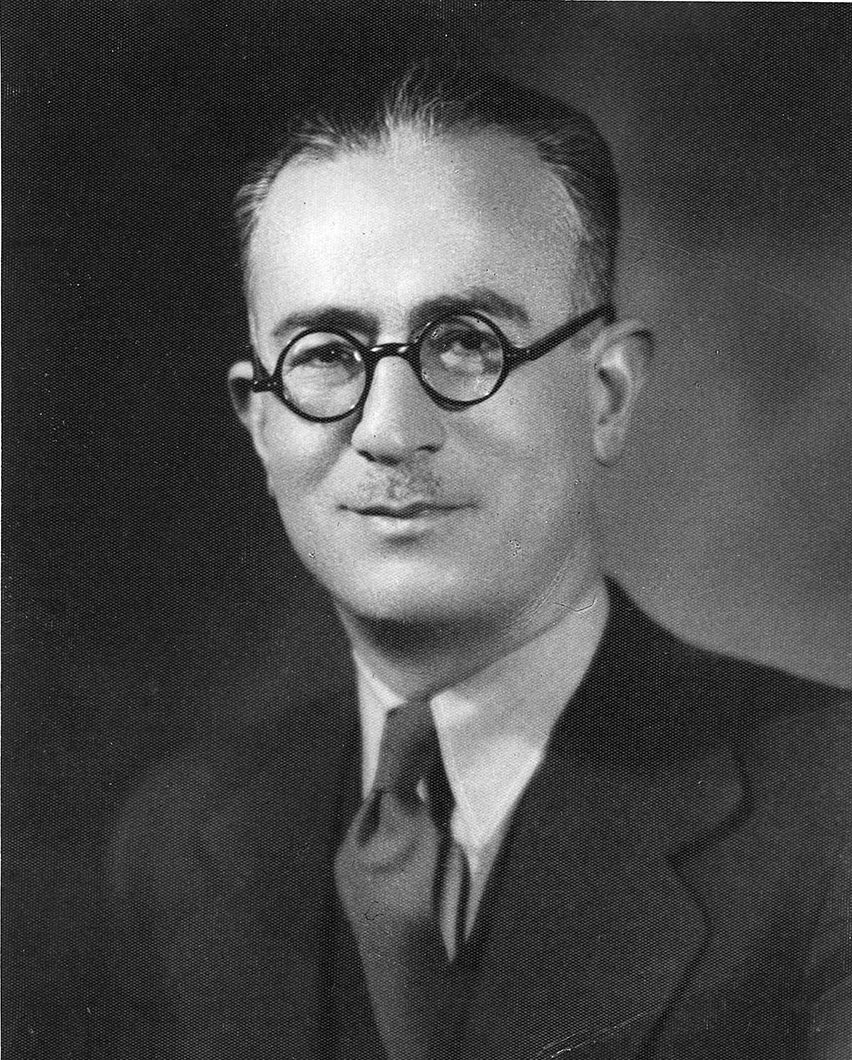

20th Prime Minister of Iran
- In office 26 October 1939 – 25 June 1940
- Monarch: Reza Shah
- Preceded by: Mahmoud Jam
- Succeeded by: Ali Mansur

Senator
- In office August 1951 – 25 June 1971

Member of the Parliament of Iran
- In office August 1949 – August 1951
- Constituency: Meshkin Shahr

Personal details
- Born: 23 January 1897 Tehran, Persia
- Died: 26 June 1971 (aged 74) Tehran, Iran
- Children: Leyly Matine-Daftary

Ahmad Matin-Daftari, also known as Mo'in al-Dowleh (Persian: احمد متین‌دفتری; 23 January 1897 – 26 June 1971), was an Iranian politician. He served as the Prime Minister of Pahlavi Iran from 1939 until 1940.

== Biography ==
The son of Showkat ad-Dowleh and grand-son of Najm al-Saltaneh.

Ahmad Matin-Daftari was born on 23 January 1897 in Tehran to father Mirza Mahmud-Khan Ain ul-Mamalek. He studied in Tehran's German School and received his Ph.D. in France. He wrote his dissertation in 1929.

Matin-Daftari served as Senator in Iran's Majlis and became Prime Minister on 26 October 1939 with the fall of Mahmoud Jam's administration. During his premiership, the first National census was implemented in Iran and Iran's first National Radio transmitter was inaugurated. Matin Daftari was removed from the office on 25 June 1940.

Matin-Daftari was thrown in prison after the Anglo-Soviet invasion of Iran by the Allies in 1941 because of his German connections.

He was Mohammad Mosaddegh's nephew and son-in-law. through his marriage to Mansoureh Mossadegh.

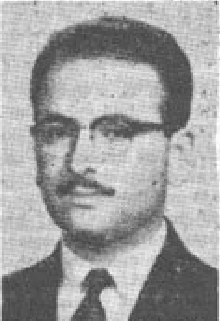
Hedaytollah Matin-Daftari, son of Matin-Daftari.

== Issue ==
They had two sons and one daughter,.

- Leyly Matine-Daftary; (b. 1937 -d. 2007) Married Kaveh Farmanfarmaian, son of Abdol-Hossein Farman Farma
- Hedayatollah Matin-Daftari whowas lawyer and leader of the National Democratic Front political party. Later president of the Iranian Bar Association. Married Maryam Khajeh-Nouri. Lived in Europe due to being an opponent of the regime and joined in the National Resistance Council
- Ali Matin-Daftari

== Death ==
Matin-Daftari died in Tehran at the age of 74.

== See also ==
- Pahlavi dynasty
- Abdolhossein Teymourtash

== Bibliography ==
- 'Alí Rizā Awsatí (عليرضا اوسطى), Iran in the Past Three Centuries (Irān dar Se Qarn-e Goz̲ashteh - ايران در سه قرن گذشته), Volumes 1 and 2 (Paktāb Publishing - انتشارات پاکتاب, Tehran, Iran, 2003). ISBN 964-93406-6-1 (Vol. 1), ISBN 964-93406-5-3 (Vol. 2).

Political offices
Preceded by Mahmoud Jam	Prime Minister of Iran; 1939–1940	Succeeded by Ali Mansur
