= Mohammad Hoqouqi =

Iranian poet and critic (1937–2009)

Mohammad Hoghooghi محمد حقوقى
- Born: 3 May 1937 Isfahan, Imperial State of Iran
- Died: 29 June 2009 (aged 72) Isfahan, Iran
- Occupation: Poet, writer, literary critic

Mohammad Hoghooghi (Persian: محمد حقوقى; 3 May 1937 – 29 June 2009) was an Iranian poet and critic.

Of the more than 30 books he has published, Modern Poetry, from Beginning until Today is considered one of the leading encyclopedic sources on modern Iranian poetry.

Hoghooghi suffered from cardiac and renal issues for several years before his death. He suffered from hepatitis which led to cirrhosis. He died on 29 June 2009 in his hometown of Isfahan.

== Quote ==
- "Poets and writers want to write about the truths of their age from their perspective, but their times don't allow it. But they do write something anyway. And this writing constitutes resistance. Because, in any age, the poet has been a protester of a kind, resisting the thought molds of the day. However, this protest might be political, it might be social, or it might even be philosophical. At any rate, the artist is at odds with the prevalent conduct and thinking of his age; this has always been the case."

== Works ==
- Angles and Orbits
- Winter Seasons
- The Orientals
- Inevitable Escapade
- With Night
- With Wound and Wolf
- A Cock with Thousand Wings
- Night
- Remain O Night and From Heart to the Delta
