= Lotfollah Yarmohammadi =

Iranian linguist and professor (1933–2021)

- لطف‌الله یارمحمدی
- Lotfollah Yarmohammadi standing in his personal library
- Born: 23 July 1933; Farahan County, Imperial State of Iran
- Died: 31 July 2021 (aged 88); Shiraz, Iran
- Education: Indiana University
- Occupation: Professor emeritus of linguistics at Shiraz University
- Years active: 1991–2021
- Children: 3
- Awards: Allameh Tabataba'i Prize of the National Elites Foundation (2011)

Lotfollah Yarmohammadi (Persian: لطف‌الله یارمحمدی; 23 July 1933 – 31 July 2021) was an Iranian linguist and a national exemplary professor at Shiraz University. He was a permanent member of the Academy of Sciences of Iran and the founder of the master's program in language teaching in Iran.

Yarmohammadi conducted research and published works in linguistics, English language teaching, and discourse analysis. In 2011, he was selected as a recipient of the Allameh Tabataba'i Scientific Prize by the National Elites Foundation.

== Education ==
- PhD in Linguistics, Indiana University, 1964
- Master's degree in English Language and English literature, Indiana University, 1960
- Bachelor's degree in English, Higher Teacher Training College, 1958

== Selected works ==
No.	Book title – author(s) – publisher
1	Communication from the Perspective of Critical Discourse Analysis, Lotfollah Yarmohammadi, Tehran: Hermes Publishing.
2	Fundamentals of Linguistics: A Textbook for Associate and Bachelor's Degree Programs in Teaching Persian Language and Literature, Lotfollah Yarmohammadi, Kourosh Safavi, Ahmad Samii, Tehran: Madreseh Publishing, 2008.
3	Basic Persian for Foreign Learners, Lotfollah Yarmohammadi, Firouz Sedighi, Shiraz: Navid Shiraz Publishing, 2006.
4	Common and Critical Discourse Analysis, Lotfollah Yarmohammadi, Tehran: Hermes Publishing, 2014.
5	Contrastive Analysis of English and Persian Sounds: A Textbook in Applied Phonetics, Lotfollah Yarmohammadi, Shiraz: Shiraz University Press, 2004
6	Descriptive Thematic Encyclopedia of the Humanities, Discourse Analysis, Sociolinguistics, Psycholinguistics and Neurolinguistics, Lotfollah Yarmohammadi, Reza Nilipour, Tehran: Farzaneh Mehr Publishing, 2003
7	A Study of Modern Persian Phonetics: Intonation and Related Features, Jalil Tohidi, translated by Lotfollah Yarmohammadi and Mohammadreza Parhizgar, Tehran: SAMT, 2011
8	A Contrastive Study of Persian and English Sentence Structure (English Translation Studies), Lotfollah Yarmohammadi, Tehran: Payame Noor University
9	Teaching English Pronunciation through Transformational Phonetics, Lotfollah Yarmohammadi and Gholamreza Pouratefadal, Tehran: SAMT
10	A Contrastive Study of Persian and English: Vocabulary, Phonetics and Syntax, Lotfollah Yarmohammadi, Tehran: Payame Noor University
11	An Introduction to Phonetics, Lotfollah Yarmohammadi, Tehran: University Publishing Center.
12	Teaching Materials to Adults, Lotfollah Yarmohammadi
13	A Computerized Frequency Dictionary of the Persian Language, Lotfollah Yarmohammadi
14	A Study of Grammatical and Lexical Issues in the Persian Language
15	From Shiraz to Kashmir: A Collection of Articles on Language Teaching, Lotfollah Yarmohammadi, Qom: Fanoos Andisheh; Shiraz: Zand Institute of Higher Education, 2010.

== Death ==
Lotfollah Yarmohammadi died in Mordad 1400 from COVID-19.

Following his death, a number of academic and educational institutions, including Shiraz University and the Iran Language Institute, issued separate condolence messages and held commemorative events and meetings in his honor.

The editorial board of the biannual journal Research in English Language and Literature Education at Farhangian University dedicated the inaugural issue of the journal to his memory and featured his photograph on its cover.

On the first anniversary of Yarmohammadi's death, the journal Motarjem published two articles about his life, contributions, and works in issue 78: "The Friend Loves This Confusion", and "A Review of the Contributions and Works of Lotfollah Yarmohammadi". A ceremony was also held at Shiraz University to unveil Yarmohammadi's biography and the Pirouyan Prize.

Five years after his death, Shiraz University officially unveiled his bust at Eram Botanical Garden, along with the busts of several other prominent professors of the university.
