= Lotfollah Meisami =

Iranian journalist and publisher (born 1942)

Lotfollah Meysami
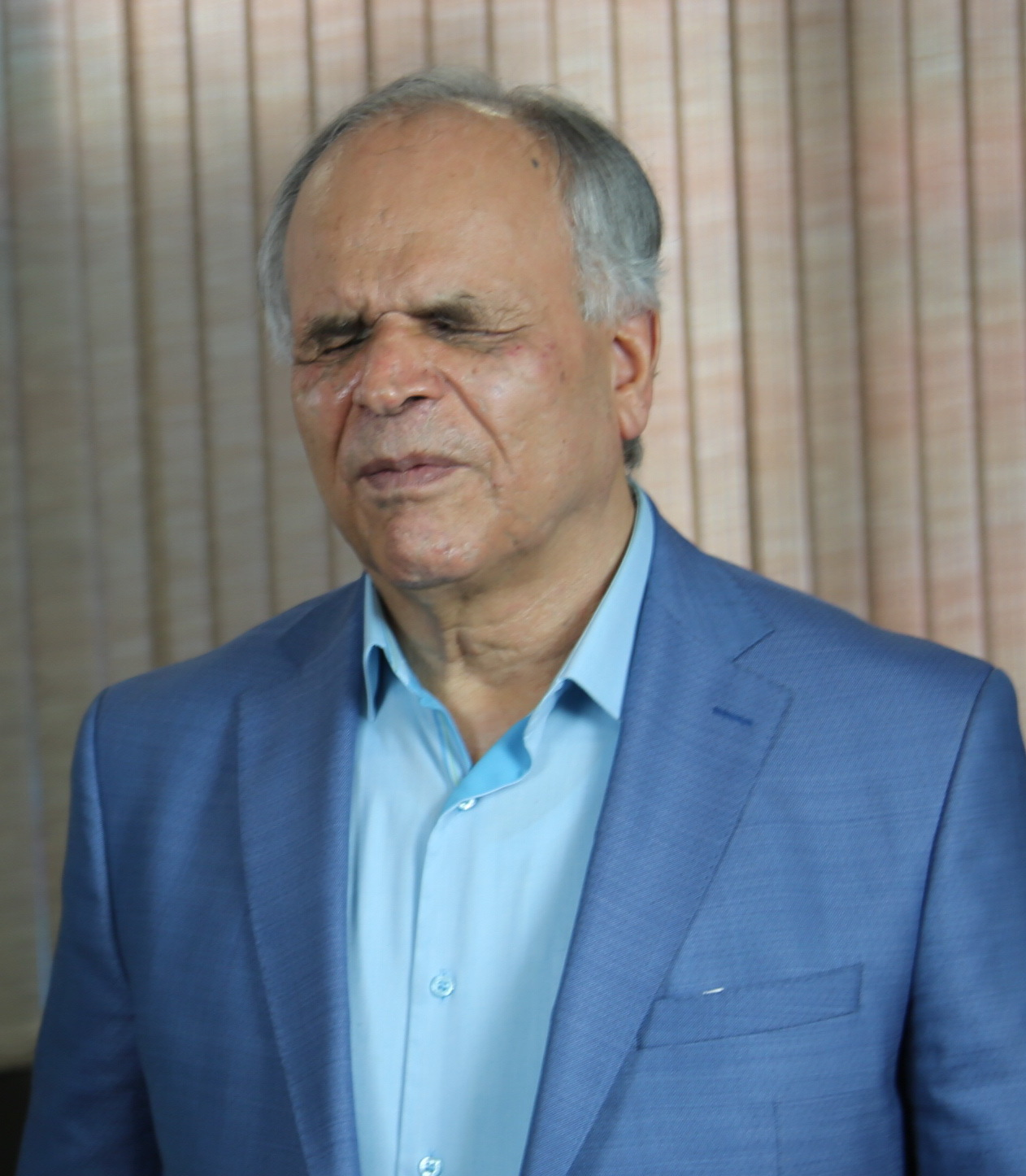
- Born: 1942 (age 83–84); Isfahan, Iran
- Education: University of Tehran
- Political party: Council of Nationalist-Religious Activists of Iran (2000–); People's Mujahedin of Iran (1969–75); Freedom Movement of Iran (1961–69); National Front (1959–69)
- Military career
- Allegiance: Iran
- Branch: Imperial Iranian Army
- Service years: 1964–1966

Lotfollah Meysami (Persian: لطف‌الله میثمی) is an Iranian Nationalist-Religious activist, journalist and publisher.

He owns and publishes Cheshmandāz-e Irān (lit. 'Iran's Outlook'), a two-monthly magazine on politics and strategy.

== Political activity ==
Meisami was a student activist with the National Front and Freedom Movement of Iran while studying at the University of Tehran. After graduation, he secured a job and could make a stable future for himself, but he chose to join the People's Mujahedin of Iran (MEK) to engage in the guerilla movement against the Pahlavy dynasty. Meisami was blinded by a self-made bomb and also lost a hand.

He was sentenced to imprisonment multiple times, from winter 1963 to summer 1964 at Qasr Prison for his association with the Freedom Movement of Iran, and between summer 1971 and 1973 at Evin Prison and 1974 to 1979 for his activities with the MEK. He left the MEK following its ideological shift to Marxism. He then founded an organization in 1976/77, namely People's Mujahedin Movement of Iran.
