= Mahmoud Djam =

Prime Minister of Iran from 1935 to 1939

- محمود جم
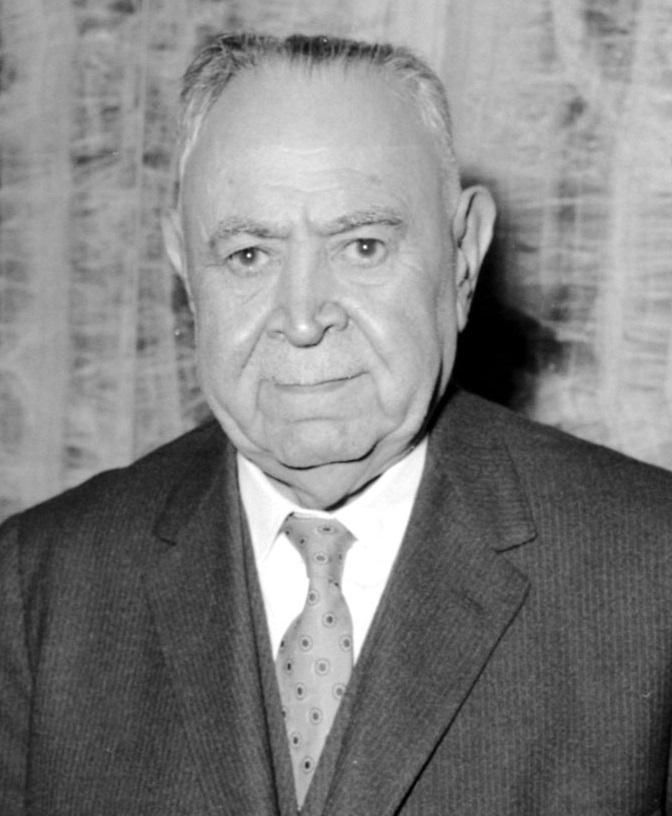
- Mahmoud Jam in 1938

19rd Prime Minister of Iran
- In office 3 December 1935 – 26 October 1939
- Monarch: Reza Shah
- Preceded by: Mohammad-Ali Foroughi
- Succeeded by: Ahmad Matin-Daftari

Senator from Kerman
- In office 5 September 1954 – 10 August 1969

Personal details
- Born: 1880 Tabriz, Persia
- Died: 10 August 1969 (aged 88–89) Tehran, Iran
- Party: Nationalists' Party (1957–1960)
- Spouse(s): Malakeh Zaman (divorced); Soghra Aziz ol-Molouk
- Children: Fereydoun, Parvin

Mahmoud Modir al-Molk Djam (Persian: محمود مدیرالملک جم; 1880 – 10 August 1969) was a prime minister of Iran from 1935 to 1939.

== Early life ==
Djam was born in Tabriz in around 1880.

== Career ==
Djam learned French from a Frenchman in Tabriz and began to work as a translator at the French legation. In 1921, he was appointed foreign minister to the cabinet of Seyyed Zia. He served as finance minister in the cabinet headed by Reza Shah. Djam then served as governor of Kerman and Khorasan. In September 1933, he was appointed interior minister. From December 1935 to October 1939 he served as prime minister. The Persian Corridor was inaugurated during his premiership. From October 1939 to September 1941 Djam was the minister of court. Next, he served as Iran's ambassador to Egypt. In 1948, he was again appointed minister of court. Next, he was named ambassador to Italy. Until his death he was a senator.

During his public service, Djam was a member of the Committee of the Iron (Committee-e Ahan).

== Death ==
He died in Tehran on 10 August 1969 at the age of 89.

== See also ==
- Esmail Merat
- Fazlollah Reza

Political offices
Preceded by Mohammad-Ali Foroughi	Prime Minister of Iran; 1935–1939	Succeeded by Ahmad Matin-Daftari
