= 1890 in Iran =

- Decades
- See also: Other events of 1890; Years in Iran

The following lists events that happened during 1890 in Qajar era.

== Incumbents ==
- Monarch: Naser al-Din Shah Qajar

== Births ==
- July 17 – Zabih Behrouz, Iranian writer, poet, linguist and playwright.
- September 29 – Ahmad Kasravi, Iranian academic.
- ? – Abbas Mirza Farman Farmaian, Qajar prince.
- ? – Allameh Sayyed Abul Hasan Rafiee Qazvini, Iranian philosopher and religious servant.
- ? – Mohammad Vali Mirza Farman Farmaian, Qajar prince, Iranian politician.
