= Abbas Mirza Farman Farmaian =

Qajar prince (1890–1935)

- Born: 1890
- Died: 1935 (aged 44–45)
- Issue: See below
- House: Farmanfarmaian
- Dynasty: Qajar
- Father: Abdol-Hossein Farman Farma

Prince Abbas Mirza Farman Farmaian Qajar (Persian: عباس میرزا فرمانفرماییان; 1890–1935) was an Iranian prince of the Qajar dynasty, the second son of Prince Abdol-Hossein Farman Farma, one of the most influential political figures of Qajar Iran, and of Princess Ezzat ed-Dowleh Qajar, the daughter of Mozaffar ad-Din Shah Qajar and his first wife Taj ol-Molouk. He was named after his great-grandfather, Crown Prince Abbas Mirza, the son of Fath-Ali Shah Qajar.

== Education ==
When in 1899, due to the intrigues of Mozaffar ad-Din Shah's entourage, Abdol-Hossein Mirza Farmanfarma was exiled to Baghdad in Ottoman Mesopotamia, he sent his three oldest sons to Beirut, to the College of Saint Joseph, a school administered by Jesuit fathers. At that time, Firouz Nosrat-ed-Dowleh III was 12 years old, Abbas 10, and Mohammad Vali Mirza Farman Farmaian 9 years old.

Abdol-Hossein Farmanfarma had progressive ideas and believed that to lead Iran into the modern world, his children should study in European schools and universities as opposed to receiving a purely classical education. In 1903, Firouz left Beirut for the Lycee Janson de Sailly in Paris. A year later, the two young princes, still in Lebanon, set out for Europe accompanied by their French tutor, Monsieur Andre Montadon. At a stop in Constantinople, Mohammad Hossein Mirza Firouz, the fourth son of Farmanfarma, and a young cousin, Hossein Gholi, joined them for the journey.

Abbas Mirza was a sensitive young man who appreciated nature and the human environment. He liked literature, the arts, photography, Italian operas, and history, though ultimately, he was destined for a military and political career. He was also fluent in English, French and Arabic.

The young prince toured a number of European countries before finally settling down. Abbas Mirza was sent to Harrow School, before training as an officer at the Royal Military College, Sandhurst. He also studied at the Universite de Liege. Finally, he spent a year in France with the Chasseurs Alpins before returning to Persia. On his return, he wrote a book in Persian titled One Year in the French Army (Published 1910) which he dedicated to his cousin the young Ahmad Shah Qajar.

In 1911, Abbas Mirza married Zahra Soltan Ezzat al-Saltaneh, daughter of Reza Gholi Khan Nezam al-Saltaneh. She was a young lady very much interested in the arts and a fluent French speaker. In the same year, Abbas Mirza attended the coronation of King George V. While in London, he found a book on the diplomatic relations between Iran and Napoleon which he then translated. The book was published in Tehran with the title The relationship of Napoleon and Iran.

== Work ==
Before World War I, Abbas Mirza who had been given the honorary title of Salar Lashkar (Army Chief), served as a member of the army General Headquarters in Tehran. He was the commanding officer of two battalions, the Nahavand and the Farahan. He also held the post of governor for the Hamadan province.

During World War I, he was appointed Secretary of War, as part of the National Government led by his father in law, Nezam al-Saltaneh. The Provisional Government was allied to the Germans and the Ottomans and fought the Russian invasion of the western areas of Iran. After Germany's defeat, Nezam al-Saltaneh was exiled to Constantinople with his family, but in the post war turmoil Abbas Mirza returned to Tehran to assist his brother Firuz Nosrat-ed-Dowleh III, now the Minister of Foreign Affairs, and his father Abdol-Hossein Farman Farma, the then governor of the Fars province.

After the war, Abbas Mirza was governor of Kermanshah, Hamadan, and Lorestan. For a short period as well he was the Minister of Social Affairs. He was also in the Ministry of War, as part of a comittiee to reform and modernise the Iranian military institutions. In the years leading to the fall of the Qajar dynasty, and after its fall, he was twice elected to the Parliament (Majles).

Throughout his life, which involved war, public service, and raising a family (four daughters and two sons), Abbas Mirza maintained an active interest in photography and left a large collection of works behind. He also wrote a history of the war in Mesopotamia (1914–1918), which has been published by Siamak Books, Tehran (1386). He was struck by cancer at the age of 45 and died in Berlin in 1935.

== Publications ==
- One Year in the French Army. 1910
- The relationship of Napoleon and Iran. 1911
- History of the war in Mesopotamia (1914–1918) (Published posthumously by Siamak Books)

== Government positions held ==
- Member of Army General Headquarters (Tehran). C/O of two battalions: The Nahavand and the Farahan. (Pre World War I)'
- Secretary of War, 1914–1918
- Governor of the Hamadan, 1915–1916
- Governor of the Kermanshah, 1918–1919
- Governor of the Hamadan province, 1918–1919
- Governor of the Lorestan province, 1918–1919
- Minister of War, 1919–1920
- Minister for Justice, 1920
- Minister of Social Affairs, 1920–1921
- Elected Member of 5th Majles, 1925
- Elected Member of 6th Majles
- Elected Member of 7th Majles, 1930
- Vice-president in the 7th Majles, 1930

== Offspring ==
- Princess Homa Farman-Farmaian (b. 1914–) married Ali Ettehadieh (1901, Tabriz–2000, Paris). She has issue two sons and two daughters: 1) Mansoureh Ettehadieh (b. 1933–) married Dr Nezam Mafi (b. 1924–2009), She has issue, 3 sons and a daughter, Parinaz Eleish, Nader Nezam Mafi, Taghi Nezam Mafi and Sharif Nezam Mafi. 2) Rahim Ettehadieh, he has issue, two sons Mehdi Ettehadieh and Amir Bahman Ettehadieh and a daughter, Haideh Ettehadi'eh. 3) Farhad Ettehadieh. He has issue, two daughters, Maryam Ettehadieh and Leyla Ettehadieh. 4) Shirin Ettehadieh. She has two sons with Dr Hormoz Hojabr : Dr Theodore Taher Hojabr Ghelichi (eye-surgeon) and Alexis A. Hojabr Ghelichi (lawyer).
- Princess Taj-ol-Moluk Farman-Farmaian (b. 1915–d. 4 January 2002). She has issue a son, Mehdi and a daughter, Zahra. Mehdi has one son, Roman Hossein Khonsari (craniofacial surgeon). Zahra has two sons, Amir-Reza Amiri and Mozafar Amiri.
- Princess Ezzat-ol-Moluk Farman-Farmaian (b. 1916–) married Mehdi Pirnia son of Mirza Hassan Khan Moshir ed-Dowleh, has issue a son, Parviz Pirnia. Parviz Pirnia has three sons, Hassan-Ali Pirnia, Amir-Hossein Pirnia and Mohammad Pirnia.
- Prince Bahram Farman-Farmaian (b. 1926–) married Bilqeys Alam daughter of Amir Mohammad Ebrahim Alam Shokat-ol-Molk, Governor-General of Fars, and sister of Amir Asadollah Alam (1919–1978) Prime Minister of Iran during 1962–1964. He has issue, two sons and one daughter: 1) Prince Abbas Farman-Farmaian (b. 1957) 2) Prince Reza Farman-Farmaian and 3) Princess Neda Farman-Farmaian.
- Prince Bahman Farman-Farmaian (b. 1934– d. 2012), member of the board International Qajar Studies Association and Kadjar (Qajar) Family Association, regular contributor Qajar Studies, Journal of the International Qajar Studies Association, married Monir Kafa'i. He has issue, a daughter, Princess Sahar Farman-Farmaian.
- Princess Mehri-Dokht Farman-Farmaian, married Asghar Emami (d. 1999–2016), has issue, three sons, Mir Hossein Emami, Abolghasem Emami and Reza Emami.

== See also ==
- Farmanieh district of Tehran
- History of Iran
- Qajar dynasty
