= Allah Verdi Mirza Farman Farmaian =

Qajar prince (born 1929)

- Born: Allah Verdi; 1929
- Died: August 28, 2016 (aged 86–87); Princeton, New Jersey, U.S.
- Education: Doctorate in biology, Stanford University, 1959; Reed College, Oregon, Stanford University
- Occupations: Professor, physiology, Rutgers University, retired
- Spouse: Parvin Saidi
- Children: 2
- Parents: Abdol Hossein Mirza Farmanfarma (father); Hamdam Khanoum (mother)
- Family: Qajar dynasty Farmanfarmaian

Allah Verdi Mirza Farman Farmaian (Persian: الله‌وردی میرزا فرمانفرمائیان; 1929 – August 28, 2016) was a son of Prince Abdol-Hossein Farman Farma of the Qajar dynasty of Iran and his wife Hamdam Khanoum.

He studied biology at Reed College (BA 1952), and obtained an MS (1955) and PhD (1959) in Biological Sciences at Stanford University, where his research focused on marine physiology at Hopkins Marine Station in Pacific Grove, California, as well as in a postdoctoral fellowship at University of California Berkeley. He did research work in membrane physiology, worked at the Marine Biological Laboratory (MBL) in Woods Hole, Massachusetts, and founded the department of physiology at Shiraz University (Iran, 1961–1967). A prominent academic in the United States, he was a professor and head of the biology department at Rutgers University in New Jersey, where he worked for 30 years, and visiting professor at Princeton University.

== Sources ==
- Daughter of Persia; Sattareh Farman Farmaian with Dona Munker; Crown Publishers, Inc., New York,1992
- Blood and Oil: Memoirs of a Persian Prince; Manucher Mirza Farman Farmaian. Random House, New York, 1997.
