= Firouz (disambiguation) =

Firouz may refer to:

- Elsa Firouz Azar (born 1983), Iranian film actress
- Firouz, armour maker who held a high post in Yaghi-Siyan's Seljuk Turkish government during the Crusades
- Firouz Karimi (born 1956), Iranian football manager
- Firouz Mirza Nosrat-ed-Dowleh Farman Farmaian III, (1889–1937), GCMG (1919) eldest son of Prince Abdol-Hossein Mirza Farmanfarma
- Firouz Naderi (born 1946), Iranian-American scientist and Director for Solar System Exploration at NASA's JPL
- Kiana Firouz, Iranian lesbian activist and filmmaker currently residing in the UK
- Louise Firouz, American-born, Iranian horse breeder and researcher
- Mohammad Hossein Mirza Firouz (1894-?) KCVO, Iranian prince of Qajar Dynasty
- Mozaffar Firouz (1906–1988), the eldest son of prince Firouz Mirza Nosrat-ed-Dowleh Farman Farmaian III by his first wife
- Nosrat-od-Dowleh Firouz Mirza (1818–1886), Persian prince of Qajar Dynasty, was the 16th son of crown prince Abbas Mirza
