= Fereydun Mirza =

Iranian prince and poet (1810–1855)

- Farmanfarma
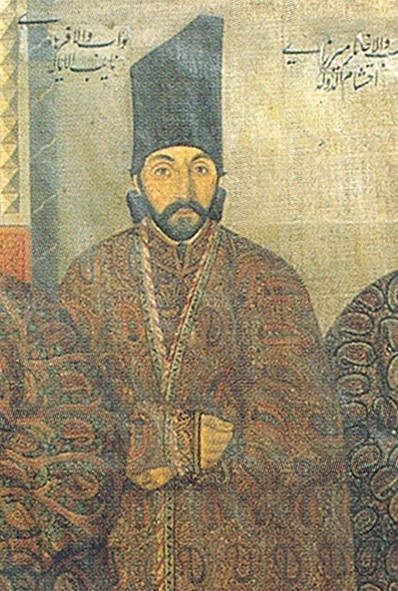
- Illustration of Fereydun Mirza, from the Nezamiyeh Hall in the Golestan Palace, Tehran
- Born: 1810
- Died: 20 December 1855 (aged 44–45); Mashhad, Qajar Iran
- Dynasty: Qajar
- Father: Abbas Mirza
- Religion: Twelver Shia Islam

Fereydun Mirza (Persian: فریدون میرزا) was a Qajar prince, governor and poet in 19th-century Iran. The fifth son of Crown Prince Abbas Mirza, he held the governorships of Tabriz (1833–1834), Fars (1836–1840), and Khorasan (1851–1854).

== Biography ==
Portrait of Fereydun Mirza, dated 1816, Louvre

Fereydun Mirza was the fifth son of the Qajar prince Abbas Mirza. Favored by his father since he was a little boy, he was appointed vice-governor of Azerbaijan in 1831 when Abbas Mirza traveled to put down an uprising in Khorasan. Following Abbas Mirza's death in 1833, Fereydun Mirza served as the governor of Tabriz during the governorship of Azerbaijan by his elder brother, Crown Prince Mohammad Mirza. After Mohammad Mirza (now known by his regnal name Mohammad Shah) became the new shah (king) of Iran in 1834, Fereydun Mirza defeated the Turkmens in Gorgan, conquering Qari Qal'a. As a reward, Fereydun Mirza was given the title of farmanfarma and the governorship of Fars in 1836. Mirza Taqi Qavam-al-Dawla was appointed as his minister.

In 1839, the inhabitants of Shiraz, the provincial capital, rebelled against Fereydun, even though his governorship had initially been successful. This was due to the mistreatment by his treasurer, Mirza Ahmad Khan Tabrizi. The numerous grievances expressed by others, as well as the findings of Mirza Taqi Qavam-al-Dawla regarding Mirza Ahmad Khan, were all disregarded by Fereydun Mirza. The residence of Fereydun Mirza was besieged by the rebels, and in 1840 Mohammad Shah dismissed Fereydun Mirza from his office and sent him back to the capital, Tehran, since no solution was attainable. After that, Fereydun Mirza was not given any official positions by Mohammad Shah, even though the grand vizier Haji Mirza Aqasi tried to advocate for him.

In 1851, Fereydun Mirza was appointed the governor of Khorasan by Mohammad Shah's son and successor Naser al-Din Shah Qajar (r. 1848–1896). He defeated the alleged 40,000 army of the ruler of the Khiva khanate, Mohammad-Amin Khan, who was killed along with fourteen princes. Order was thus brought back to Khorasan, and Fereydun Mirza was rewarded with lavish presents by Naser al-Din Shah for this victory. Fereydun Mirza died in 1854 in the city of Mashhad.

Reported to have shown "benevolence to the entire population of Fars", Fereydun was considered one of the more virtuous and intelligent Qajar princes. He wrote poetry under the pen name "Farrokh"; some of his works are included in the Majma al-fosaha by Reza-Qoli Khan Hedayat and Hadiqat al-sho'ara by Ahmad Divanbeygi.

== Sources ==
- Nava'i, Abd-al-Hosayn (2020). "Farmānfarmā, Fereydūn Mīrzā". In Yarshater, Ehsan (ed.). Encyclopædia Iranica (Online ed.). Encyclopædia Iranica Foundation.
