= Hasan Ali Mirza =

Qajar prince (1790–1854)

- Shoja ol-Saltaneh
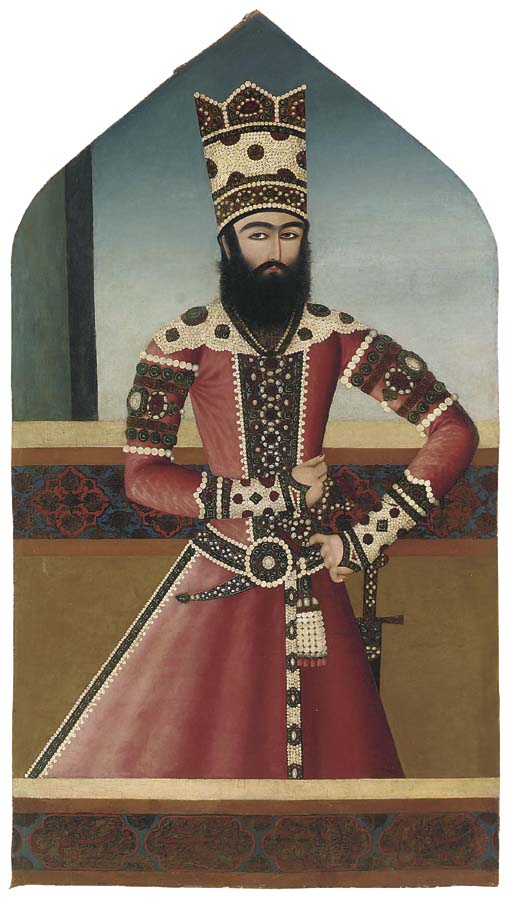
- Portrait of Hasan Ali Mirza. Made at the studio of Mihr 'Ali, 1810–1815
- Born: 1790
- Died: 1854 (63–64); Tehran, Qajar Iran
- Burial: near the shrine of Imam Husayn, Karbala
- Dynasty: Qajar
- Father: Fath-Ali Shah Qajar
- Mother: Badr Jahan Khanom
- Military career
- Conflicts: Capture of the Mahmudabad fort (1817); qajar occupation of Jam (1817); Siege of Herat (1817); Battle of Darra-yi Bum (1817); Battle of Kafir Qala

Hasan Ali Mirza Shoja ol-Saltaneh (Persian: حسنعلی میرزا شجاع السلطنه; 1790–1854) was a Qajar prince and one of the younger sons of Fath-Ali Shah Qajar (r. 1797–1834), the second shah of the Qajar dynasty. He served as governor of key provinces, including Kerman, Yazd, and Khorasan, and was known for his military skill and bravery. After his father's death in 1834, he supported his brother Hossein Ali Mirza in a failed attempt to seize the throne, which led to his capture, blinding, and imprisonment. In addition to his political and military involvement, Hasan Ali Mirza was also a poet, writing in Persian under the pen name "Shekaste".

== Biography ==
Born in 1790, Hasan Ali Mirza was the sixth son of the Fath-Ali Shah Qajar (r. 1797–1834). His mother was Badr Jahan Khanom. In different years, he held the governorship (as prince-governor) of first Tehran, Bastam and Jajarm (1804–1816), and then the eastern Iranian provinces of Khorasan (c. 1816/17–1823/1827) and later Kerman and Yazd (1827/28–1835).

Hasan Ali Mirza was known for his remarkable abilities, bravery, and military achievements, but held a strained relationship with his half-brother, Crown Prince Abbas Mirza (1789–1833). Following the signing of the notorious Treaty of Turkmenchay in 1828, Hasan Ali Mirza requested that his father, Fath-Ali Shah, grant him the title of "Nayeb ol-Saltaneh", traditionally held by the crown prince, and expressed his willingness to command the Iranian army and continue the conflict with Russia. However, the shah rejected his request and instead appointed Hasan Ali Mirza as the new prince-governor of Kerman and Yazd. Hasan Ali Mirza's elder full brother, Hossein Ali Mirza, had governed the province of Fars as prince-governor since 1799. Like Hasan Ali Mirza, he was openly hostile to Crown Prince Abbas Mirza and his son Mohammad Mirza, who would later ascend to the throne of Iran as Mohammad Shah Qajar (r. 1834–1848). Wealthy and powerful, Hossein Ali Mirza viewed himself as the legitimate heir to Fath-Ali Shah's throne and frequently defied the central authority.

In the early 1830s, Hasan Ali Mirza actively supported his elder brother Hossein Ali Mirza in his quest for the Iranian throne. After Fath-Ali Shah's death on 24 October 1834, and Mohammad Shah's rise to power in Tehran, Hossein Ali Mirza quickly declared himself the Shah of Iran in Shiraz, with a formal enthronement on 4 December 1834. During this time, coins were minted bearing the name "Hossein Ali Shah"—gold and silver in Shiraz, and silver in Kerman and Yazd—and his name was mentioned in the Friday prayers (khutba). However, his self-proclaimed reign in Shiraz was brief. Forces loyal to Mohammad Shah soon defeated Hossein Ali Mirza's supporters, and the rebellious prince was captured and taken to Tehran. He died in confinement from cholera on 22 July 1835.

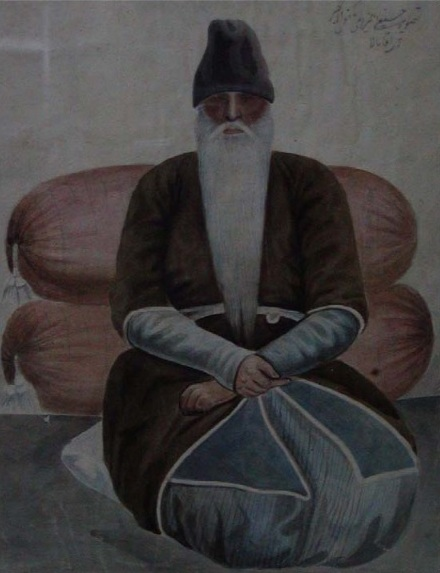
Portrait of an older Hasan Ali Mirza, painted by Aqa Bala in Tehran between 1848 and 1854. Part of the Oriental Collection at the Shalva Amiranashvili Museum of Fine Arts (Georgian National Museum)

Hasan Ali Mirza himself was captured in 1835 and cruelly blinded. After his capture, he was initially imprisoned in a fortress in Ardabil before being transferred to a prison in Tabriz in 1837. Upon Naser al-Din Shah Qajar's rise to the throne in 1848, Hasan Ali Mirza was released and allowed to settle in Tehran. However, the extensive years of imprisonment and his blindness had severely affected his health. Additionally, Hasan Ali Mirza was a poet, composing verses in Persian under the pen name Shekaste ("broken") and he continued writing poetry until his death in 1854. He was buried in Karbala (then in the Ottoman Empire's Baghdad vilayet, now in Iraq), near the shrine of Imam Husayn.

== Sources ==
- Ashraf, Ashraf (2024). Making and Remaking Empire in Early Qajar Iran. Cambridge University Press. ISBN 978-1009361552.
- Beradze, Grigol (2019). "The Blind Qajar Prince: On a Rare Iranian Miniature of the Nineteenth Century from the Georgian National Museum". Free University Journal of Asian Studies (1).
- Hambly, Gavin R. G. (1991). "Iran during the reigns of Fath 'Alī Shāh and Muhammad Shāh". In Avery, Peter; Hambly, Gavin R. G.; Melville, Charles Peter (eds.). The Cambridge History of Iran: From Nadir Shah to the Islamic Republic. Vol. 7. Cambridge: Cambridge University Press. pp. 144–173. ISBN 0-521-20095-4.
