= 2026 Iranian strikes on Arab countries =

During the 2026 Iran war, Iran carried out a series of missile strikes and drone attacks against several Arab countries in the Middle East. They also involved security threats against territorial waters and maritime routes in the Strait of Hormuz.

According to Iranian authorities, the attacks targeted American interests and military bases in the region in response to strikes by the United States and Israel that targeted Iran. They also stated that any country that would allow its territory to be used for attacks against Iran would be considered a legitimate target. The governments of the targeted countries reported that several missiles and drones fell in civilian areas or near non-military facilities, including residential areas, economic facilities, international airports, hotels, and energy installations. The targeted countries condemned the attacks and considered them a violation of their sovereignty, especially since they were not involved in the conflict, and stated they have a right to respond and defend themselves under international law.

Between 28 February and 18 March 2026, Qatar was targeted by 203 missiles and 87 drones, in addition to an attack involving two fighter jets. Saudi Arabia was hit with at least 38 missiles and 435 drones, while Jordan was targeted with a total of 204 missiles and drones. Oman was targeted with drones and strikes on the ports of Salalah and Duqm and the towns of Sohar and Bukha, while intercepting at least 19. The strikes caused damage to infrastructure and civilian facilities, disrupted flights, and prompted elevated military alert in the affected countries. In response, air defense systems around key installations were reinforced. The attacks have also triggered widespread political and diplomatic reactions throughout the region.

On 15 April 2026, the Financial Times reported that Iran allegedly used a Chinese spy satellite to guide strikes against US bases through the Middle East.

== Attacks by country ==
=== Iraq ===
Total casualties in Iraq included more than 146 killed and 522 injured.

More than 101 members of the pro-Iranian Popular Mobilization Forces (PMF), including 30 fighters of the Islamic Resistance in Iraq (IRI), had been killed in US and Israeli airstrikes. By 10 April 2026, 270 PMF members were also injured, although the number of injured IRI fighters was updated to 320 by the end of June. Another 32 PMF members were injured in a new round of US strikes in July. The IRI is composed of PMF members who have engaged in direct attacks on US military forces in Iraq. US airstrikes on PMF positions also killed seven Iraqi soldiers and two policemen, while 19 soldiers were injured.

In addition, in Iraq's northern Kurdish region, 32 people were killed and around 150 injured both in Iranian strikes and from pro-Iranian Iraqi groups. The dead included: 27 Peshmerga soldiers belonging to either the KRG or the militias of the Kurdish parties of the CPFIK, two civilians, one Asayish security forces member, one French soldier and one unknown person. The injured also included six or seven French soldiers.

Three more civilians were killed in a rocket attack in southern Iraq that reportedly originated from Kuwait. Elsewhere, an Iraqi policeman was killed in a drone strike in Baghdad on the headquarters of the Iraqi National Intelligence Service.

=== Bahrain ===
In Bahrain, Iran launched attacks on residential areas and energy facilities. In Sitra, the Bahraini Ministry of Health reported that 32 civilians were injured in a drone attack, including some in serious condition. In Ma'ameer, authorities announced the control of a fire that broke out in a facility after being targeted. Reports also indicated damage to the Bapco Refinery after an attack on the Sitra area.

As of 18 March 132 missiles and 234 drones were fired at Bahrain.

=== Jordan ===
Jordanian authorities announced that the country was targeted by dozens of missiles and drones, and that the armed forces intercepted most of them.

On 12 March, the Public Security Directorate announced that shrapnel fell in the Hashemite area in Zarqa Governorate, causing limited damage to a water line.

On 02 September 2026, the Islamic Revolutionary Guard Corps (IRGC) announced that it had carried out missile and drone operations against American positions and bases in Jordan, Bahrain, and Iraq in response to the US attacks. This was one of the most extensive military responses by Tehran since the ceasefire began.

After the Sirik wedding airstrike, Iran’s IRGC Aerospace Force launched a major ballistic missile attack on a US air base in Jordan. The missiles hit hangars storing RQ-4 and MQ-9 drones, destroying several aircraft and killing several pilots and crew members. The attack also caused fires that damaged technical facilities at the base.

=== Kuwait ===
In Kuwait, Iran launched attacks toward the airport, electrical infrastructure, and residential buildings. The Kuwaiti Ministry of Foreign Affairs condemned the Iranian attacks and noted that some of them targeted Kuwait International Airport.

On 9 March, the Ministry of Electricity, Water, and Renewable Energy announced that a fire that broke out in the fuel tank at Subiya Power Station was caused by drone debris.

Kuwait announced the death of a child who died from injuries sustained after drone debris fell on a residential area.

The Islamic Revolutionary Guard Corps (IRGC) stated that it had carried out a combined missile and drone attack on the Ali Al Salem Air Base in Kuwait. According to the statement, the attack targeted the headquarters of the American commander, a hangar, and a drone deployment area. The IRGC also claimed that several enemy personnel and drones stationed at the base were destroyed.

=== Oman ===
In Oman, Iran began launching a series of drone strikes on sites in Oman starting from 1 March, initially targeting the Port of Duqm and the Port of Salalah, which are used by the United States.

The attacks also struck two oil tankers, one off the coast of Muscat and another about five kilometres north of the Port of Khasab. The UAE-flagged tugboat Mussafah 2 was attacked by Iran in the Omani territorial waters of the Strait of Hormuz, killing four crew members. separate drone strikes targeted an industrial zone in Sohar and Bukha. The attacks killed 18 people and injured 23 others.

=== Qatar ===
In early March, the Qatari Ministry of Defense announced that the country was targeted by two ballistic missiles, one of which was intercepted by air defenses, while the other fell on Al Udeid Air Base without causing any human casualties.

Additionally, missile debris fell on a food storage warehouse, causing a fire in several warehouses.

=== Saudi Arabia ===
Saudi Arabia faced several missile and drone attacks during the regional escalation in March 2026. The attacks targeted military sites, oil facilities, and sensitive areas in the capital, the east, and the Empty Quarter. The Saudi Ministry of Defense announced the interception of ballistic missiles heading toward the Prince Sultan Air Base in Al-Kharj. There were also repeated reports about the targeting of the Shaybah Oil Field in the Empty Quarter.

In the Eastern Province, Saudi authorities announced an attempted attack on the Ras Tanura Refinery by a drone. In Riyadh, media reports indicated that a drone attack targeted the area around the U.S. Embassy in the diplomatic district, resulting in limited damage.

=== United Arab Emirates ===
The UAE was subjected to missile and drone attacks targeting the country's airspace and several civilian targets. According to an official report, hundreds of missiles and drones were tracked, and there were recorded fatalities, injuries, and property damage.

In Dubai, the Dubai Media Office reported that two drones fell in the vicinity of Dubai International Airport, resulting in four people being injured. In Abu Dhabi, the Abu Dhabi Media Office announced the control of a fire that broke out at the Old Abu Dhabi Airport due to debris falling after an air interception, with no injuries reported. As of 18 March 342 missiles and 1,699 drones were fired at UAE. By 27 March UAE reported Iran launched 378 ballistic missiles, 15 cruise missiles and some 1,835 drones at the UAE. On 28 March, Iranian strikes hit Emirates Global Aluminium plant at Al Taweelah, Abu Dhabi. The strike caused severe damage, leading to an operational shutdown and repairs which are expected to take up to one year. Employees were injured in the attack.

== Timeline ==
Date	Country	Attack details
28 February	Saudi Arabia	Strikes targeting Riyadh and the Eastern Province
2 March	Saudi Arabia	Two drone strikes
3 March	Saudi Arabia	10 drone strikes
4 March	Saudi Arabia	One drone strike
5 March	Saudi Arabia	3 cruise missiles and 4 drone strikes
7 March	Saudi Arabia	3 missiles and 23 drone strikes
8 March	Saudi Arabia	One ballistic missile and 35 drone strikes
9 March	Saudi Arabia	Two ballistic missiles and 23 drone strikes
10 March	Saudi Arabia	One ballistic missile and 7 drone strikes
11 March	Saudi Arabia	3 ballistic missiles and 28 drones
12 March	Saudi Arabia	5 ballistic missiles and 53 drones
13 March	Saudi Arabia	One ballistic missile and 56 drones
14 March	Saudi Arabia	6 ballistic missiles and 17 drones
15 March	Saudi Arabia	30 drone strikes
16 March	Saudi Arabia	92 drone strikes
17 March	Saudi Arabia	One ballistic missile and 24 drones
18 March	Saudi Arabia	12 ballistic missiles and 30 drones
10 March	Kuwait	Cumulative total: 237 missiles and 445 drones + additional interceptions
11 March	Kuwait	Missile and drone attacks
12 March	Kuwait	5 ballistic missiles and 9 drones (in addition to attacks)
13 March	Kuwait	1 ballistic missile and 1 drone
14 March	Kuwait	11 drones
15 March	Kuwait	14 drones
16 March	Kuwait	Missile attacks + 6 drones
17 March	Kuwait	2 missiles and 13 drones
18 March	Kuwait	4 ballistic missiles and 23 drones
4 March	Qatar	Cumulative total: 101 ballistic missiles, 3 cruise missiles, 39 drones + attack with two aircraft
5 March	Qatar	14 ballistic missiles + 2 cruise missiles + 14 drones
6 March	Qatar	10 drones
8 March	Qatar	10 ballistic missiles + 2 cruise missiles
9 March	Qatar	17 ballistic missiles and 6 drones
10 March	Qatar	2 missile attacks (one with 5 missiles)
11 March	Qatar	9 ballistic missiles + drones
12 March	Qatar	2 ballistic missiles + 1 cruise missile + drones
14 March	Qatar	4 ballistic missiles + drones
15 March	Qatar	Drone attacks
16 March	Qatar	14 ballistic missiles + drones
17 March	Qatar	9 ballistic missiles + drones
18 March	Qatar	7 ballistic missiles
11 March	Oman	Several drones (fuel tank hit in Salalah)
12 March	Oman	Drone shot down
13 March	Oman	Drone fell in Sohar
7 March	Jordan	119 missiles and drones (108 intercepted)
14 March	Jordan	85 missiles and drones (79 intercepted)
14 July	Bahrain	The Islamic Revolutionary Guard Corps targeted several weapons storage facilities, a satellite communications center, and a residence for American forces at Juffair Base, Bahrain.
16 July	Bahrain	IRGC said it destroyed a US air defence system and radar installations in Bahrain’s Muharraq area.
17 July	American centers/bases in Bahrain	The Islamic Republic of Iran's army mentioned in a statement that the army's drone attacks were on American centers and bases in Bahrain

== Reactions ==
The Gulf countries did not request the United States to initiate war, and initially sought to de-escalate the situation while encouraging diplomatic solutions. More than two weeks after the outbreak of the conflict and the continued Iranian attacks targeting civilian and economic facilities in their countries, including oil facilities, ports, airports, and cities, as well as disrupting shipping in the Strait of Hormuz, Gulf states began urging Washington not to end operations before weakening Iran's military capabilities significantly. The U.S. is seeking to rally Gulf support for participation in the war, while Gulf states remain cautious and avoid direct involvement for fear of escalation.

Abdulrahman Al-Rashed, former director of Al-Arabiya television, criticized that some Arab countries are justifying Iran's aggression towards other Arab countries, which he argues is reflective of a wider cultural crisis between Arab states.

By 29 March 2026, analysts of the Jewish Institute for National Security of America estimated that the Gulf states had burned through the majority of their interceptor missiles, with UAE and Kuwait having spent some 75% of their stock of Patriot missiles on defending against Iranian attacks, while Bahrain was estimated to have launched up to 87%.

Omar Al Qasim argued in April 2026 that the Iranian strikes permanently altered the Gulf states' security calculus. Neither the survival nor the fall of the Iranian regime in the current conflict would be strictly desirable outcomes. He concluded that united pressure of Gulf states should force the United States to deliver a "comprehensive resolution of underlying threats", later defined as Iran's capabilities in the fields of ballistic missiles, unmanned aerial systems, proxy networks, and regional intervention mechanisms. For long-term security, a united defense architecture of Gulf states will be essential, with genuine collective leadership.

According to Roxane Farmanfarmaian, the American military bases that were intended to guarantee the security of the Gulf states, are now the targets of Iran, which could affect the Gulf states' view regarding American presence on their soil.

== See also ==
- 2026 Iran war regional mobilizations
- Economic impact of the 2026 Iran war
- Evacuations during the 2026 Iran war
- Gulf Cooperation Council
- Reactions to the 2026 Iran war
- Attacks on the United States
