= Begom Jan Khanom =

Iranian princess

Begum Jan Khanom
- Born: c. 1787
- Died: before 1834 (before age 47)
- Spouse: Mohammad-Qasem Zahir od-Dowleh
- Issue: Malek Jahan Khanom; Fatemeh (Begum) Khanom; Suleiman Khan E'tezad od-Dowleh
- Dynasty: Qajar
- Father: Fath-Ali Shah Qajar
- Mother: Badr Jahan Khanom

Begum Jan Khanom (Persian: بیگم‌جان خانم; born c.1787; died before 1834), a Qajar princess, was a daughter of Fath-Ali Shah Qajar and Badr Jahan Khanom. She was the mother of Malek Jahan Khanom (Mahd-e Olia), the mother of Naser al-Din Shah Qajar.

== Biography ==
She was the second child of Fath-Ali Shah Qajar among all his children. Her mother was the shah's first wife, i.e. Badr Jahan Khanom. She was born around 1787.

She was raised in her father's court, where she acquired knowledge of literature and virtues from the scholars of her time. It is well known that she had an inclination toward Sufism and mysticism and was a disciple of Haj Molla Reza Hamadani. Additionally, it is said that she was often consulted by her father and accompanied him both in travel and at home. Begum spent a significant portion of her personal wealth promoting Shia Islam, particularly supporting scholars and preachers of the Atabat (the Shia holy sites in Iraq).

Begum Jan Khanum married Mohammad-Qasem Zahir od-Dowleh, and they had three children together:

- Malek Jahan Khanom (Mahd-e Olia) (died 6th Rabi' al-Thani 1290 AH / 12 May 1873 CE), wife of Mohammad Shah Qajar and mother of Naser al-Din Shah and Ezzat ed-Dowleh.
- Fatemeh (Begum) Khanum (died 1288 AH / 1871 CE), wife of Shahrokh Mirza, a son of Hossein Ali Mirza Farmanfarma.
- Suleiman Khan E'tezad od-Dowleh.

== Death ==
She died during the reign of her father, Fath-Ali Shah Qajar. This means that she died before her father's death (1834).
