= Sabar Farmanfarmaian =

Iran Minister of Health, doctor, nobility

Sabar Farman Farmaian صبار فرمانفرمائیان
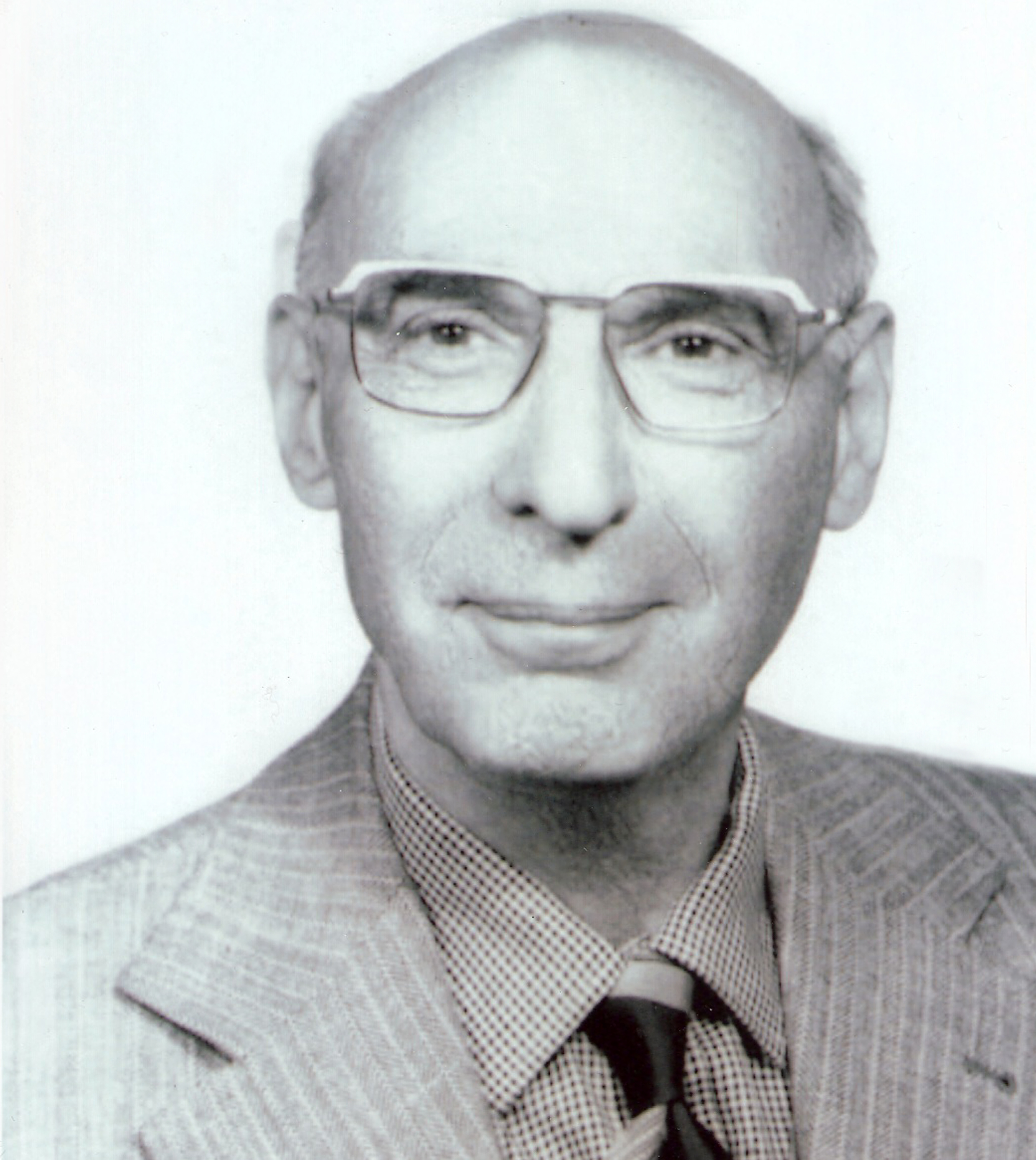

Minister of Health
- In office 21 July 1952 – 19 August 1953
- Prime Minister: Mohammad Mosaddegh
- Preceded by: Mohammad Ali Maleki
- Succeeded by: Mohammad Ali Maleki

Governor of Fars
- In office 28 April 1951 – 17 July 1952
- Prime Minister: Mohammad Mosaddegh

Personal details
- Born: 14 July 1912 Mashhad, Iran
- Died: 19 April 2006 (aged 93) Tehran, Iran
- Resting place: Behesht-e Zahra
- Relations: Sattareh Farmanfarmaian (sister)
- Parent(s): Abdol-Hossein Farman Farma; Massoumeh Khanum Tafresh
- Education: University of Geneva

Sabar Mirza Farman Farmaian (1912–2006) was an Iranian doctor, researcher, and Qajar aristocrat. He served as the director of the Pasteur Institute of Iran and served as the Iran Minister of Health (1952–1953). He was the first son of Qajar prince Abdol-Hossein Mirza Farman Farma, through Masoumeh Khanoum.

== Biography ==
He was born in 1912 in Mashhad, Iran, to parents Massoumeh Khanum Tafreshi (1899–1978) and Abdol Hossein Mirza Farmanfarma. At the age of 12, he was sent to France to continue his studies. He studied medicine in France and Switzerland, eventually earning him a degree from University of Geneva in 1983.

He quickly decided on medicine, specialising in malaria and studying it to a great extent. Sabar Farmanfarmaian participated in a number of projects initiated by the World Health Organization.

He was a staunch supporter of Mosaddegh during Iran's oil nationalisation in 1953. He held the post of Minister of Health, during Mossadegh's second cabinet, holding office from 21 July 1952 – 19 August 1953.

He died on 19 May 2006 and is buried in Behesht-e Zahra Cemetery in Tehran. He never married.

== See also ==
- History of Iran
- Qajar dynasty of Iran

== Sources ==
- Daughter of Persia; Sattareh Farman Farmaian with Dona Munker; Crown Publishers, Inc., New York,1992
- Blood and Oil: Memoirs of a Persian Prince; Manucher Mirza Farman Farmaian. Random House, New York, 1997.
