= Mohammad-Ali Emam-Shooshtari =

Seyyed Mohammad-Ali Emam-Shooshtari (Persian: محمدعلی امام شوشتری; 1902–1972) was a prominent Iranian historian and religious scholar.

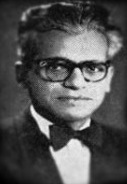
Seyyed Mohammad-Ali Emam-Shooshtari

== Biography ==
Shooshatri was born in 1902 A.D. in Shushtar, Iran. Most of his ancestors were religious scholars the most prominent of which is Seyyed Nematollah Jazayeri and Seyyed Abdullah, who was the head of assembly at Mugan plain and he wrote the coronation speech of Nader Shah Afshar. He was the son of Seyyed Mohammad Sharif, Friday Emam of Shushtar and 8th descendant of Seyyed Nematollah Jazayeri. His mother was Sareh Beigum, the granddaughter of famous shia scholar, Sheikh Jafar Shooshtari who lived at the time of Naser al-Din Shah Qajar. His paternal lineage was as follows: Mohammad-Ali son of Seyyed Mohammad Sharif son of Hajj Seyyed Mohammad Emam Jomeh son of Seyyed Hassan Emam Jomeh son of Seyyed Abdolkarim Emam Jomeh son of Seyyed Mohammad Javad son of Seyyed Abdullah son of Seyyed Noor Al-Din son of Seyyed Nematollah Jazayeri.

After finishing Shia religious studies to the degree of Ijtihad, he studied history of Arab literature under the supervision of his uncle Shaikh Mohammad Kazem Shushtari and his brother Seyyed Noor Aldin Emam Shooshtari. He then studied English language and became an employee of Ministry of Maaref. He worked as a teacher first. Then moved to Ministry of holdings. He was subsequently transferred to Tehran office of Customs. He was subsequently promoted to the head of Customs office. He was fluent in Persian, Arabic and English. He became the head of Arabic section of Pahlavi library and he collaborated with Zabih Behrouz. In 1971, he was awarded by the Shah of Iran for his books and articles. He was an expert on the early history of Islam. He made many speeches on Iranian about the early Muslim commanders who were often thought be Arab but were of Persian descent. He was diagnosed with cancer in his last few years and subsequently died due to the complications of cancer.

== Books ==
- Geographical history of Khuzestan
- History of scales and currencies in Islamic governments
- Encyclopedia of Persian words in Arabic
- Translation of "Advices of Ardeshir Babakan" from Arabic to Persian.
- Iran, the land of science and art
- History of Kingship in Kingdom of Iran
- A chapter in "Water and Watering in Ancient Persia"

== Articles ==
- History of Music in Islam
- Khuzestan in current and ancient times
- Persian gulf and the history of lighthouses
- Philosophical origins of kingship in Iran
- Seven cities of Madaen
- Mazdak and his religion
- Contribution of Iranians in early advancements of Islam
- Immense contribution of Sasanid literature in Abbasid litareature
- Influences of Iranian architecture on Islamic architecture
- Influence of Iranian culture on the Arabs
- Save the Persian language
- Why we don't care about the Persian language?
- Economic resources of Persian gulf
- Iranian painting arts in early Islamic periods
