= Mohammad Vali Mirza Farman Farmaian =

Iranian prince (1890–1988)

Mohammad Vali Mirza Farman Farmaian محمدولی میرزا فرمانفرمائیان
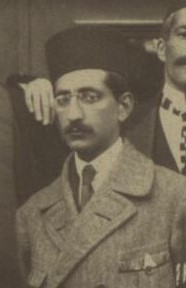
- Mohammad Vali Farman Farmaian in 1921
- Born: 1890
- Died: 1988 (aged 97–98)
- Burial: Petit-Saconnex Cemetery, Geneva, Switzerland
- House: Farmanfarmaian
- Dynasty: Qajar
- Father: Abdol-Hossein Farman Farma
- Mother: Ezzat ed-Dowleh

Mohammad Vali Mirza Farman Farmaian (Persian: محمدولی میرزا فرمانفرمائیان; 1890–1988) was an Iranian prince of the Qajar dynasty and the third son of Prince Abdol-Hossein Farman Farma and his wife Princess Ezzat ed-Dowleh.

== Life ==
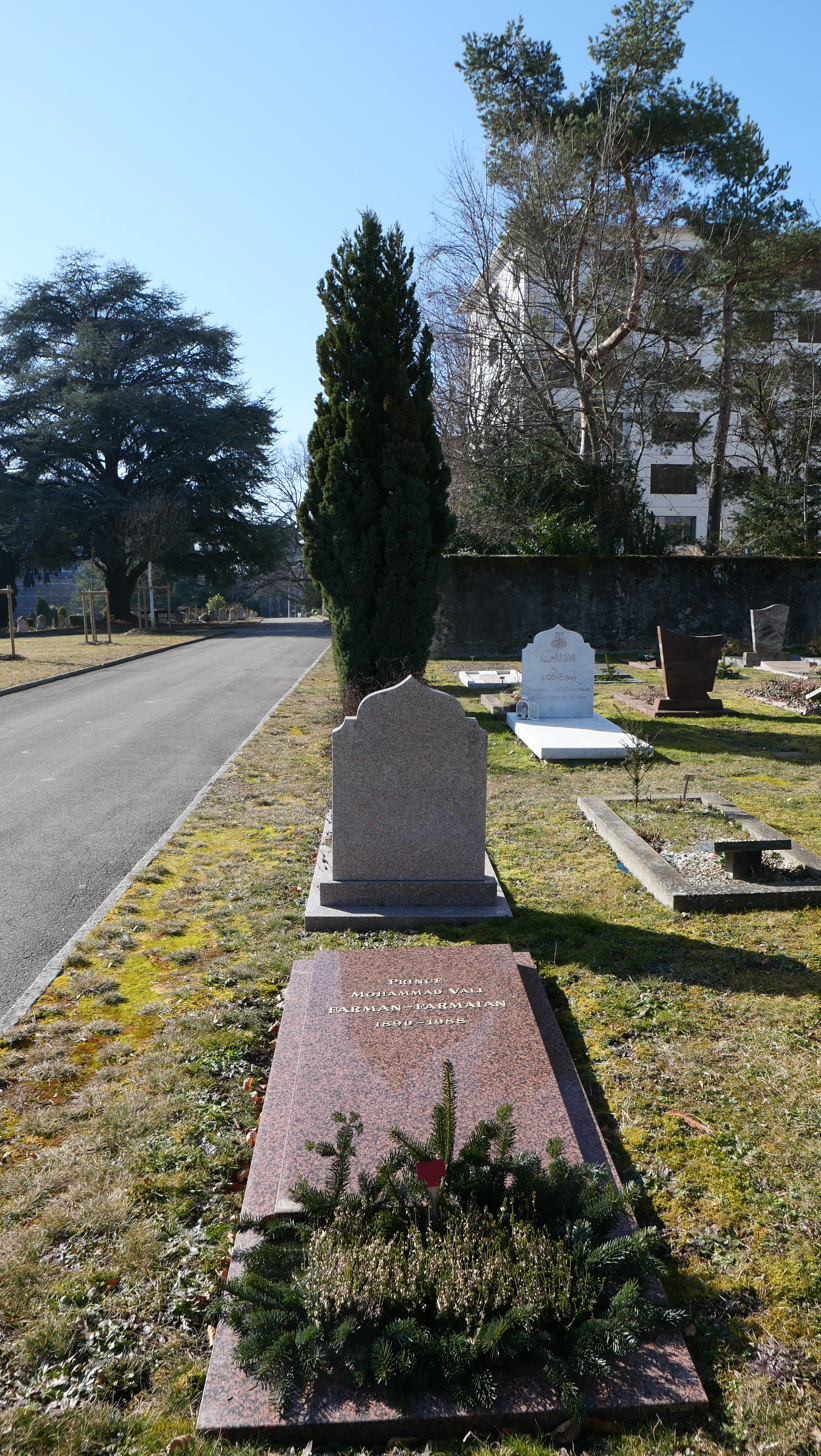
Vali's grave at the cemetery of Petit-Saconnex in Geneva

Since his youth, Mohammad Vali had spent a great deal of time in Iranian Azerbaijan, where he owned considerable estates. Consequently, even in language, he preferred Azerbaijani to the nationally dominant Persian.

His roots to Iranian Azerbaijan were revealed when at the age of 26, he earned a prominent position in the Majles (Iranian parliament) as the representative of Tabriz. Working through the Majles, he invited American advisors to help reform the military, rural security system, gendarmerie, and public financial sector.

Many advisors came including Colonel Norman Schwarzkopf and Dr Arthur Millspaugh who had previously been an advisor to Iran in the 1920s.

Throughout his life, Mohammad Vali built a reputation for being a fair person and an excellent mediator.

When his father and brothers were imprisoned during the 1921 coup that brought the Pahlavi dynasty to power Mohammad Vali Mirza escaped to Baghdad. Afterwards, he returned to live in virtual seclusion under Reza Shah. He died at the age of 92.

== Anecdote ==
At the end of World War I, when the Russian Communists seized many properties in Azerbaijan, Mohammad Vali Mirza travelled to Moscow to settle accounts. Disguised as a beggar, he crossed the mountain passes of Turkey on his way north but was captured by a Venezuelan general named Rafael de Nogales, who was fighting on the German side and almost shot him as a spy. Mohammad Vali Mirza escaped only at the last minute because he spoke to the general in French, prompting the general to realize, as Nogales wrote in his memoirs, "that he was a prince of the lineage of Farman Farma." Afterward the two became friends, and Mohammad Vali Mirza later bestowed a medal on Nogales in gratitude.

After the 1979 revolution he left Iran for Geneva, Switzerland with his family and did not to return to Iran until his death at the age of 98.

== Government positions held ==
- Financial Agent at Tabriz, 1916–1917
- Head of Finance Department at Tabriz, 1945–1946
- Minister of Parliament in 4th, 5th, and 6th Majles from Tabriz
- Minister of Parliament in 13th and 14th Majles from Sarab

== See also ==
- Iran
- History of Iran
- Qajar dynasty

== Sources ==
- Daughter of Persia; Sattareh Farman Farmaian with Dona Munker; Crown Publishers, Inc., New York,1992
- Blood and Oil: Memoirs of a Persian Prince, Manucher Mirza Farman Farmaian Random House, New York, 1997.
