= Fairuz (name) =

Fayrūz (Arabic: فيروز, lit. 'Turquoise'), variously transcribed as Feyrouz, Fayrouz, Fairuz, Fairooz, Fayruz etc., is an Arabic given name for females and males. It is also a surname.

== People ==
=== Fairooz ===
- Aaron Fairooz (born 1983), Canadian player of American football
- Jawad Fairooz, Bahraini human rights activist and former Member of the Council of Representatives

=== Fairuz ===
- Ahmad Fairuz Abdul Halim (born 1941), Malaysian lawyer and former Chief Justice of Malaysia
- Fairuz (born 1934 or 1935), Lebanese singer
- Fairuz Abdul Aziz (born 1985), Malaysian football player
- Fairuz Fauzy (born 1982), Malaysian race car driver
- Fairuz Hussein (born 1965), Malaysian singer-songwriter and producer
- Fairuz Renddan (born 1984) Malaysian politician
- Fairuz Zakaria (born 1997), Malaysian football player

=== Fairouz ===
- Khaled Fairouz, Kuwaiti football player
- Faïrouz Malek (born 1964), French and Algerian physicist
- Fairouz Ai (born 1993), Japanese voice actress
- Mohammed Fairouz (born 1985), American composer

=== Fayrouz ===
- Fayrouz Aboelkheir (born 2006), Egyptian squash player
- Fayrouz Benyoub (born 1995), Algerian footballer
- Fayrouz Al Halabiya (1895–1955), Jewish-Syrian singer
- Fayrouz Saad, American politician

=== Fayruz ===
- Fayruz al-Daylami (7th century), Persian companion of Muhammad

=== Feiruz ===
- Ali Feiruz (1931–1994), Somali singer

=== Feyrouz ===
- Feyrouz (1943–2016), Egyptian actress of Armenian origin

=== Feyruz ===
- Feyruz Mustafayev (1933–2018), Azerbaijani politician and Prime Minister of Azerbaijan

== See also ==
- Feroz
- Feroze
- Firouz (disambiguation)
