= Abdol-Ali Mirza Farman Farmaian =

Qajar prince (1935 – 1973)

- Photograph of Abdol-Ali Mirza
- Born: 6 January 1935
- Died: 2 February 1973 (aged 38); Dizin, Pahlavi Iran
- House: Farmanfarmaian
- Dynasty: Qajar
- Father: Abdol-Hossein Farman Farma
- Mother: Batoul Khanoum

Abdol-Ali Mirza Farman Farmaian (Persian: عبدالعلی میرزا فرمانفرمائیان; 6 January 1935 – 2 February 1973) was an Iranian businessman and nobleman. He was the youngest son of the Qajar nobleman Abdol-Hossein Farman Farma and his wife Batoul Khanoum.

== Early life ==
Farmaian was born on 6 January 1935. He studied at Oxford University in England, earning a degree in business.

== Career ==
Upon returning to Iran, he became involved in several industrial projects, including the co-founding (with his brother Cyrus) of the Naft-e Pars Pars Oil Company, which became Iran's largest private petrochemical factory.

He also co-founded the Chamber of Industries.

== Death ==
Farmaian died in an avalanche while skiing at the Dizin Resort near Tehran on 2 February 1973, leaving his daughter Mariam and his two sons Salman and Abu-Ali.

== See also ==
- Farmanfarma
- Qajar dynasty
