= Badr Jahan Khanom =

Qajar royal consort (b. 1771)

- Born: 1771; Bastam, Iran
- Died: before 1845; Shiraz, Qajar Iran
- Spouse: Fath-Ali Shah Qajar
- Issue: Homayoon Soltan; Begom Jan Khanom; Hossein Ali Mirza; Hasan Ali Mirza; Seyyedeh Begum Khanum
- Dynasty: Qajar (by marriage)
- Father: Jaffar Khan Arab Ameri

Badr Jahan Khanum (Persian: بدرجهان خانم; born 1771; died before 1845) was the first wife of Fath-Ali Shah Qajar. She gave birth to five of the shah's children, two of whom were Fath-Ali Shah's first and second children among all his children. She was a great-grandmother of Naser al-Din Shah Qajar.

== Early life ==
In 1771, she was born in Bastam, Semnan province, Iran. She was the daughter of Jaffar Khan Arab Ameri and the granddaughter of Qader Khan Arab Ameri whose family, generation after generation, governed Bastam. Her mother was the daughter of Ismail Khan Khozaimeh, the ruler of Qaenat.

In 1782, following her father's military campaign in Damghan, Agha Mohammad Khan Qajar punished him and exiled him and his family to Sari. At the time, Badr Jahan Khanum was only eleven years old. Under the order of Agha Mohammad Khan, she married his heir, Baba Khan, who would later become Fath-Ali Shah Qajar.

== Marriage ==
In 1782, by the order of Agha Mohammad Khan Qajar, she married Fath-Ali Khan as his first wife. According to the 20th-century historian Bamdad, she was Fath-Ali Shah's first permanent wife.

Sources contemporary to Badr Jahan Khanum listed her name as the shah's first wife, but the type of marriage (permanent or temporary) was not explicitly recorded. Khavari, a historian contemporary to her, states that Fath-Ali Shah was apparently practicing the religious rule of a maximum of four permanent wives, and the marriage officiant refrained from exceeding this limit. Although this marriage was the shah's first marriage and the limitation of the number of wives was not relevant, Khavari did not list Badr Jahan Khanum as one of his four permanent wives. The contemporary historian, however, did not express certainty that all the other listed wives were in a temporary marriage status. It is unclear whether she was a permanent wife and, somehow after a while, was replaced with another permanent wife or an exception was considered for the king regarding the above limitation, or she was in a temporary marriage from the beginning.

== Children ==
Badr Jahan Khanum had three daughters and two sons with Fath-Ali Shah. Her sons, in order of age, were Hossein Ali Mirza Farmanfarma and Hasan Ali Mirza.

Her daughters were as follows: Homayoun Khanum, the wife of Ebrahim Khan; Begom Jan Khanum, the wife of Mohammad-Qasem Zahir o-Dowleh, and grandmother of Naser al-Din Shah Qajar; and Hamdam Soltan Khanum, the wife of Mohammad Zaki Khan Nuri, the vizier of Fars.

Fath-Ali Shah and Badr Jahan Khanum's children are listed below in an interactive sortable table (sorted by birthdate). The table's denotations are:

- S: Son
- D: Daughter

Children
No.	S/D	Name	Title	Birth	Death	Spouse	Notes
1	D	Homayoon Soltan	Khanum Khanuman (the lady of ladies), Khan Baji	1786		Ebrahim Khan Zahir-o-Dowleh	
2	D	Begum Jan Khanum	Jan Baji	c. 1787	c. 1833	Mohammad-Qasem Zahir-o-Dowleh	mother of Malek Jahan Khanom and grandmother of Naser al-Din Shah; died before 1834.
3	S	Hossein Ali Mirza	Farman Farma	1789	1835		
4	S	Hasan Ali Mirza	Shoja os-Saltaneh	1790	1854		
5	D	Seyyedeh Begum Khanum	Hamdam Soltan	c. 1792	1833	Mohammad-Zaki Khan Noori	died of Cholera in Mecca

== Shiraz ==
In 1801, when her oldest son Hossein Ali Mirza became the governor (Farman Farma) of the Fars province at the age of 12, she moved to Shiraz, the city mostly known for science and knowledge, together with him. Initially, she relaxed for a while, then she made some contributions to the country.

== Activities ==
It is said that after the Wahhabi attack on Karbala in 1802, which caused significant destruction, Badr Jahan Khanum took the initiative to restore sacred sites and religious schools. She also dedicated several homes as endowments for scholars and students.

== Death ==
She died in Shiraz prior to 1845.

== Sources ==
- Azodi, Ahmad Mirza Azdo-Dowleh (1887). تاریخ عضدی [Azodi History] (in Persian). Maharat.
- Bamdad, Mehdi (1978). شرح حال رجال ایران در قرن ۱۲ و ۱۳ و ۱۴ هجری [Biographies of Iranian Elites in 17-20th Centuries] (in Persian). Zavvar.
- Khavari, Mirza Fazlollah Shirazi (1845). Tarikh Zol Qarnein (تاریخ ذوالقرنین) (in Persian). Ministry of Culture and Islamic Guidance of Iran.
- Qajar, Mahmoud-Mirza (2018). Golshan-e Mahmud. Ardahal. ISBN 978-600-313-312-9.
