= Abdol-Hossein Farman Farma =

Iranian prince and politician (1857-1939)

Abdol-Hossein Mirza Farman Farma
- عبدالحسين ميرزا
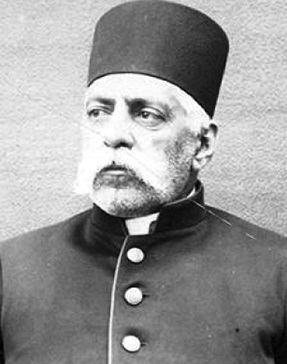

11th Prime Minister of Iran
- In office 25 December 1915 – 1 March 1916
- Monarch: Ahmad Shah Qajar
- Preceded by: Mostowfi ol-Mamalek
- Succeeded by: Vosough od-Dowleh

Personal details
- Born: 1857 Tabriz, Sublime State of Persia
- Died: 21 November 1939 (aged 82) Tehran, Imperial State of Iran
- Resting place: Shah Abdol-Azim Shrine
- Party: Moderate Socialists Party
- Children: 39
- Parent(s): Nosrat Dowleh Firouz Mirza; Hajieh Homa Khanoum
- Education: Dar ul-Funun; Tehran's Austrian Military Academy

Abdol-Hossein Farman Farma (Persian: عبدالحسین فرمانفرما; 1857 – 21 November 1939) was an Iranian prince and politician. A prominent member of the Qajar dynasty as well as one of the most influential political figures in Iran during the Qajar era, he was a member of the right-wing Moderate Socialists Party, and served as the 11th prime minister of Iran from 1915 till 1916. He previously served as Iran's minister of war from 1896 till 1897, during which he took over the government as a self-appointed premier.

During his political career, Farman Farma successfully westernised the Iranian legal system of the time, establishing Iran's first office charged with drafting a judiciary law. He also established the country's first ministry of Health in 1904 and founded the Pasteur Institute of Iran in 1920, whose first action was to introduce a smallpox vaccine in the country. Farman Farma furthermore played a crucial role in the rise of Reza Shah, whose initial career started as a private under his command.

Farman Farma was Born in Tabriz to Prince Nosrat Dowleh Firouz in 1857, he was the 16th grandson of the Qajar crown prince Abbas Mirza. He fathered 26 sons and 13 daughters by 8 wives. He lived to see four sons of his first wife die within his lifetime. The wealthy Farmanieh district in the north of Tehran is named after him.

== Biography ==
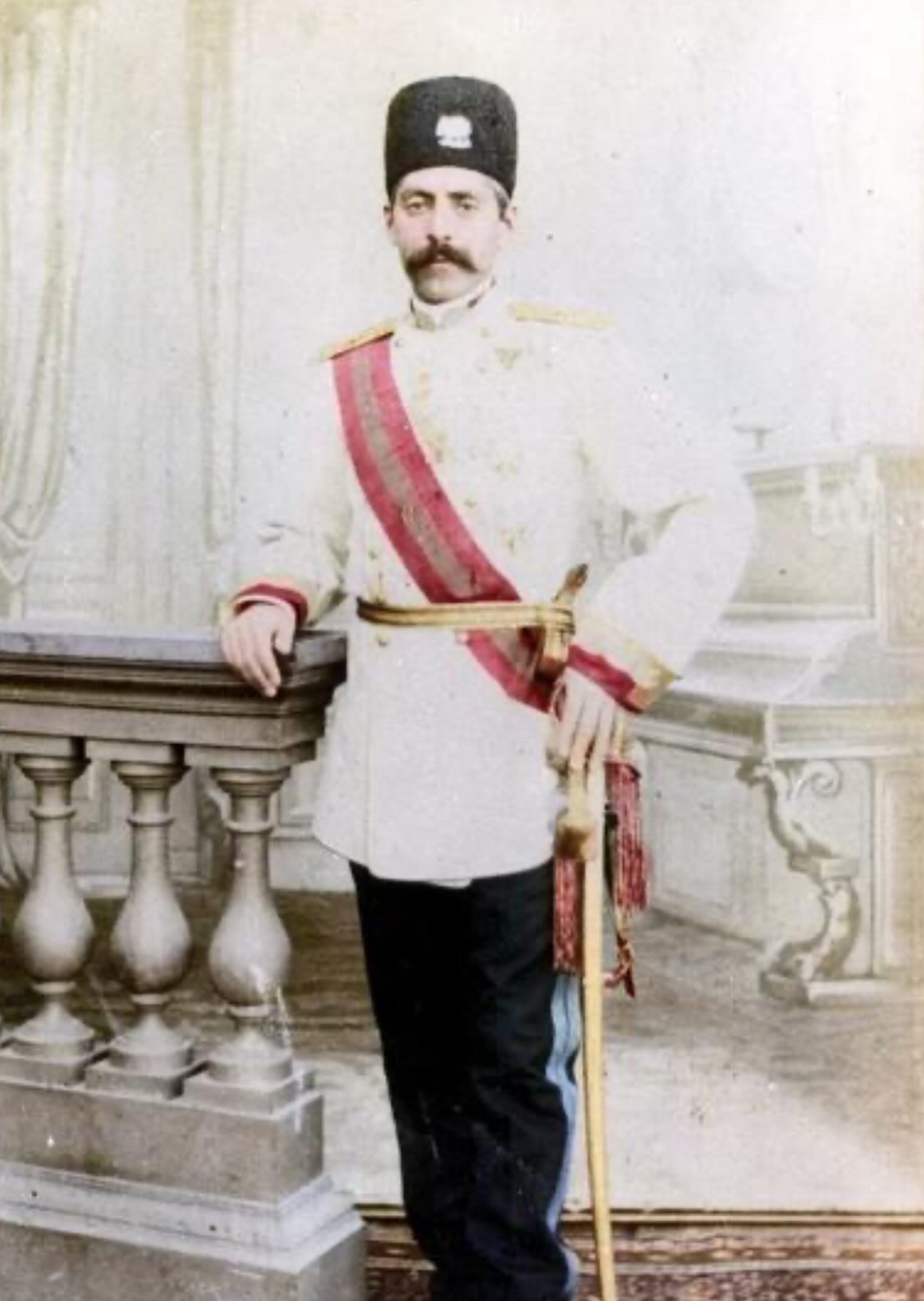
Portrait of Prince Abdul Husayn Mirza (Farma Farmaian).

Prince Abdol-Hossein Farman Farma was born to Prince Nosrat Dowleh Firouz and Hajieh Homa Khanoum in 1858 in Tabriz, and was a grandson of the Qajar crown prince Abbas Mirza.

He was extensively educated at home by private tutors in traditional subjects such as poetry, literature, mathematics, Arabic, and religion, along with modern sciences and Western languages. In 1878, at age 21, he continued his education at the Austrian Military Academy in Tehran, where he distinguished himself as a soldier and strategist.

After the death of his father in 1885, he assumed his father's former title of "Nosrat-ed-Dowleh". In 1891, as commander of the Azerbaijani troops, he received the title "Salar Lashgar", and subsequently in 1892 he received the title "Farman Farma" upon the death of his elder brother.

In 1885 he married Ezzat ed-Dowleh Qajar, daughter of Mozaffar ad-Din Shah Qajar. Following the marriage, out of respect for Ezzat ed-Dowleh and also due to her high social rank, he took no other wives for the next twenty years.

Following the accession of Mozaffar ad-Din Shah in 1896, Farman Farma led the entourage of the new Shah from Tabriz to Tehran and firmly established himself within Iranian politics. He was appointed commander-in-chief of the army and minister of war and quickly took over the government as a self-appointed premier and emerged as the real power behind the throne. It is said "he acted as the true sovereign". During this time he drafted the first laws relating to national conscription and worked towards establishing a military academy in Iran.

Farman Farma's power grab was resented by many within the court and ultimately resulted in the Shah dismissing him and assigning him to govern the province of Fars, and eventually sending him into exile in 1898. He went to Egypt, and then to Baghdad in Ottoman Mesopotamia. His wife Princess Ezzat ed-Dowleh, voluntarily followed him and stayed with him for four years until she was able to orchestrate his return to court life.

During the constitutional revolution, Farman Farma, like many of the landed aristocracy, tried to balance the demands of the constitutionalists against the royalists. His deft manoeuvring allowed him to take the post of the minister of justice in the new constitutional government. In the same year he was appointed governor general of Azerbaijan where with considerable personal courage, he took action against an incursion of Kurdish and Ottoman forces into Iran.

In 1909, Farman Farma was also appointed minister of the interior and once again as minister of justice. In his role as Minister of Justice he introduced the Western custom of secular court trials into the Iranian legal system.

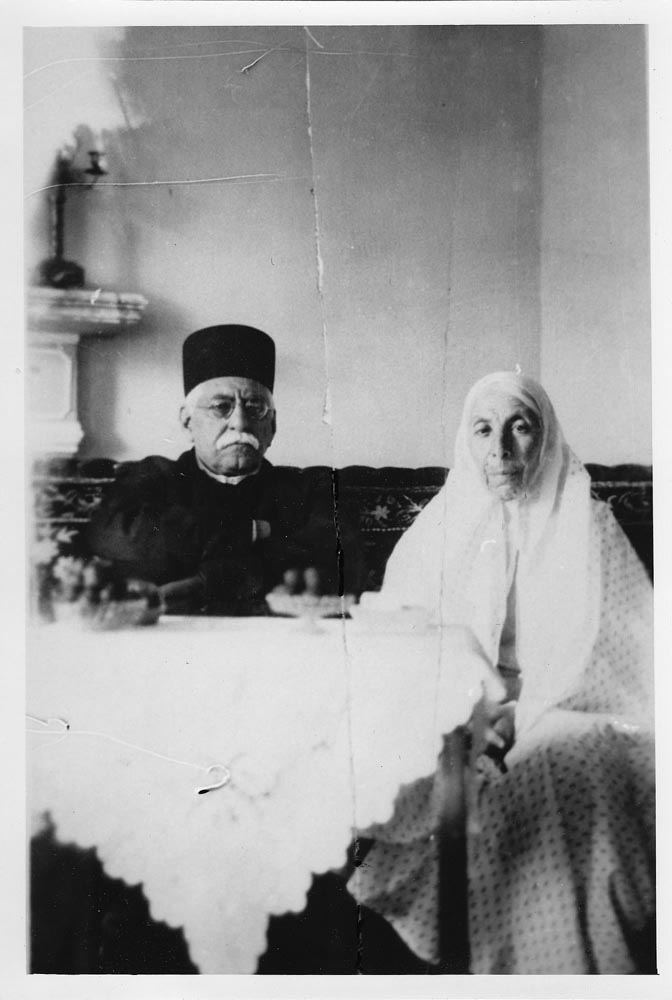
Farman Farma with his sister, Malek-Taj Najm-al-Saltaneh (mother of Mohammad Mossadegh). The photograph was taken at Najm-al-Saltaneh’s home by Abd-al-Hossein Khan Seghat-ol-Dowleh in 1923

In 1912, the Majlis dispatched Farman Farma as commander-in-chief of the army to reassert the authority of the constitutional government and repel royalist forces in Kurdistan and Kermanshah. In this expedition, Reza Khan, who would later become the Shah of Iran, served under Farman Farma's command. Farman Farma returned to Tehran to become the minister of interior a second time.

Throughout most of World War I, Farman Farma sided with the British and worked closely with them, receiving numerous payments and subsidies for his activities. He was awarded the Knight Grand Cross of the Order of St. Michael and St. George in 1916. During this time he also became prime minister, but resigned within the first three months. In his short tenure as prime minister, he established the Ministry of Health. He would later go on to found the Pasteur Institute of Iran in 1920 whose first action was to introduce a smallpox vaccine in the country.

The Shah appointed Farman Farma as governor general of Fars for a second time in 1916. His time in Fars coincided with a widespread famine as well as the Great Influenza Pandemic. He successfully managed both events and in the process organised Iran's first agricultural cooperative. He remained in Fars for four years until he was replaced by his nephew Dr. Mohammad Mosaddegh.

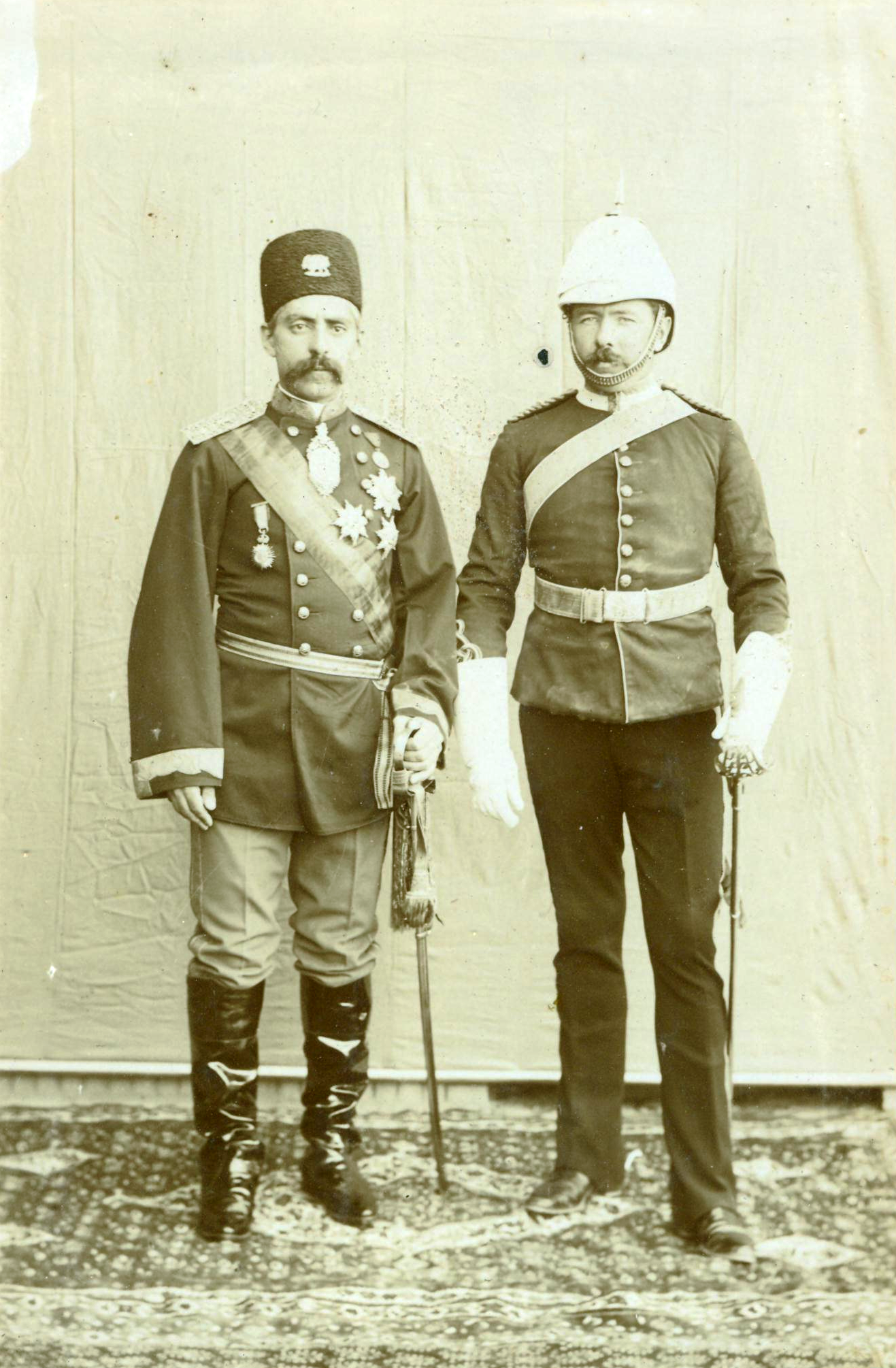
Sir Percy Sykes next to Abdol-Hossein Farman Farma in Kerman, 1902

In 1921, a successful coup d'état organised by Sayad Zia-al-Din Tabatabai took place and effectively ended Qajar rule, bringing Reza Khan to power. Farman Farma was arrested with his two eldest sons, Nosrat-ed-Dowleh who was the minister of foreign affairs at the time, and Abbas Mirza Salar-Lashgar. Nosrat-ed-Dowleh was a leading candidate for accession to the Qajar throne after Ahmad Shah Qajar's exile and the new government kept all three in the Qasr-e Qajar Prison until it could consolidate its power base. Farman Farma paid a significant ransom in order to secure the safe release of his two sons and himself.

After his release, Farman Farma made several gestures of support towards Reza Khan. Reza Khan had previously served under Farman Farma as head of a machine gun detachment and had earned the nickname "Reza Maxim". Perhaps uncomfortable that he had once served under Farman Farma's command, and certainly resentful of his wealth, Reza Khan did not reciprocate, and even confiscated numerous assets belonging to Farman Farma. The first being Farman Farma's family home and garden in Palace Street, Tehran. The family was given only 24 hours to vacate the colossal property, which then went on to become the primary residence of Reza Khan.

In 1937, Farman Farma's son, Nosrat-ed-Dowleh, was arrested and ultimately assassinated. The demise of Nosrat-ed-Dowleh was a deep personal blow for Farman Farma from which he never truly recovered. Farman Farma had by then retired from politics and dedicated himself to managing his estate and overseeing the education of his surviving children. He also channelled a significant portion of his personal wealth into philanthropic activities.

Farman Farma died in November 1939 at the age of 81 and is buried in the Shah Abdol-Azim Shrine. He fathered 26 sons and 13 daughters by 8 wives. One his daughters married to Mohsen Rais, a diplomat.

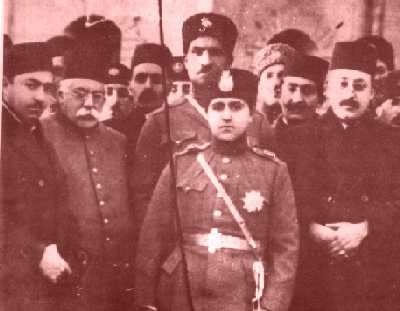
Reza Shah Pahlavi behind Ahmad Shah with Abdol-Hossein Farman Farma, 1918

== Historical anecdote ==
Among the Cossacks accompanying Farman Farma during the 1912 campaign to Kermanshah was an officer known as "Reza Maksim" because he was good at maneuvering a Maxim gun. This was none other than Reza Khan Mirpanj, who would become known as Sardar Sepah, and then as Reza Khan Pahlavi, the founder of the Pahlavi dynasty. Later Reza Khan, leader of the Cossacks brigade, became involved in a British operation and shortly afterwards in a British backed coup, to establish himself as the new Shah in 1921. The once friendly relationship between Farman Farma and Reza Khan, who had once been his subordinate, became more tenuous as Reza rose in stature and power, first as minister of war and then as shah.

== Name and title ==
His full official name and title was Hazrat Aghdas Vala Shahzadeh Abdol Hossein Mirza Farman Farma. This translates approximately as "His Highness, Prince Abdol Hossein, the Eminent and Exalted One, the Greatest of All Commanders". When surnames became compulsory he took his last title as his family name, viz. Farman Farma, which literally translates as "giver of an order", and is roughly equivalent to "viceroy".

The title "Farman Farma" did not originate with Prince Abdol-Hossein Mirza Farman Farma. It was first held by his grand-uncle Hossein Ali Mirza Farman Farma, a son of Fath-Ali Shah Qajar. Prince Abdol Hossein's father, Prince Firouz, would battle his own uncle, Prince Hossein Ali Farman Farma, in support his brother Prince Mohammad (later Mohammad Shah Qajar) and win the right to the succession for Prince Mohammad. Forty years later, Naser al-Din Shah, Firouz Mirza's nephew, would bestow the title Farman Farma on Prince Firouz in gratitude for his role in consolidating the succession to the Qajar (Kadjar) throne. The title Farman Farma then passed on to his son Prince Abdol Hossein Mirza, during the reign of Naser ed-Din Shah. Naser ed-Din Shah and Prince Abdol Hossein were cousins, but Naser ed-Din Shah was about thirty years his senior. Only Prince Abdol Hossein carried the title "Farman Farma", while most of his offspring carry the family name derived from the former title "Farman Farmaian" (lit. Those belonging to Farman Farma). His elder son Firouz Nosrat-ed-Dowleh III however chose the family name "Firouz", which is carried by his offspring.

== Non-Persian honors ==
He was awarded the following honors outside of Iran:

- Knight Grand Cross of the Order of St Michael and St George (British)

== Offspring ==
Farman Farma differentiated his family from most others through his many children. Contrary to many Iranian royals and politicians at the time and due to the uncertain political climate, he emphasised classical Iranian training as well as modern Western education and foreign languages. This applied equally to his daughters as well as his sons, and women from his family were among the very first members of the social elite to appear publicly in Western dress after Reza Shah outlawed the veil. He saw to it that his children were each sent to different countries to cultivate global relationships as well as to further their education. He ensured that they worked particularly hard towards this goal throughout their lives. As a consequence, the vast majority of his sons and daughters, after having obtained first class educations, went on to work in senior and key roles throughout the Iranian government from the turn of the century until the 1979 Islamic Revolution.

(Main source: "Shahzdeh's Tree, A Family Genealogy of Abdol Hossein Mirza Farman Farma", compiled by Mitra Farman Farmaian Jordan, 1997, Universal Printing, Washington).

- From Khanum Ezzat-ed-Dowleh Qajar (1872–1955)
  - Prince Firouz Nosrat-ed-Dowleh III (1889–1937) Married his first cousin Amena, daughter of his paternal aunt Najm -al-Saltaneh.
  - Prince Abbas Farman Farmaian (1890–1935)
  - Prince Mohammad Vali Farman Farmaian (1891–1988)
  - Prince Mohammad Hossein Firouz (1894–1984)
  - Prince Nezam-ed-Din Farman Farmaian (1899–1920)
  - Prince Mohammad Ja'ffar Farman Farmaian (1901–1920)
- From Mah Bagum Khanum (1892–1915)
  - Princess Bodagh Farman Farmaian (1909–2002)
- From Massoumeh Khanum Tafreshi (1899–1978)
  - Prince Sabar Farman Farmaian (1912–2006)
  - Princess Jabbareh Farman Farmaian (1916–2009)
  - Princess Sattareh Farman Farmaian (1921–2012)
  - Prince Farough Farman Farmaian (1925–2014)
  - Princess Ayesheh (Homerah) Farman Farmaian (1928–2023)
  - Prince Ghaffar Farman Farmaian (1930–2021)
  - Princess Soraya Farman Farmaian (1931–2003)
  - Prince Haroun-al-Rashid Farman Farmaian (b. 1933)
  - Princess Khorshid Farman Farmaian (b. 1937)
- From Batoul Khanum Ahshami (1896–1975)
  - Princess Maryam Farman Farmaian (1913–2008)
  - Princess MehrMah Farman Farmaian (1915–2013)
  - Prince Manucher Farman Farmaian (1916–2003)
  - Prince Abdol-Aziz Farman Farmaian (1921–2013)
  - Prince Abol-Bashar Farman Farmaian (1922–1991) Married Monir Shahroudy and had issue.
  - Princess Leyla Farman Farmaian (1925–2011)
  - Princess Haideh Farman Farmaian (1927–2011)
  - Prince Cyrus Farman Farmaian (1929–2026)
  - Prince Abdol-Ali Farman Farmaian (1935–1970)
- From Fatemeh Khanum Alinaghi (Shirazi) (1900–1984)
  - Princess Mahsama Farman Farmaian (1918–2000s)
  - Prince Jamshid Farman Farmaian (1919–2006)
  - Prince Kaveh Farman Farmaian (1920–2004). Married Leyly Matine-Daftary and had issue.
  - Prince Ali Naghi Farman Farmaian (1923–2021)
  - Prince Alidad Farman Farmaian (1924–2010)
  - Prince Hafez Farman Farmaian (1927–2015)
- From Khanum Akhtarzaman Hormozian (1906–1979)
  - Prince Karimdad Farman Farmaian (1923–2014)
- From Hamdam Khanum Talai (originally Safar) (1913–1969)
  - Prince Khodadad Farman Farmaian (1928–2015)
  - Prince Allah Verdi Farman Farmaian (1929–2016)
  - Prince Tari Verdi Farman Farmaian (1931–1969)
- From Batoul Khanum Chizar Doost (1909–1997)
  - Princess Roudabeh Farman Farmaian (b. 1937)

== Government positions held ==
- Commander of the Gendarmerie (1884)
- Commander in Chief of the Army in Azerbaijan (1890)
- Governor of Tehran (1896)
- Governor of Kerman (1892–1893), and (1894–1896)
- Governor of Kurdistan (1894)
- Governor of Fars (1897–1898), and (1916–1921)
- Governor of Kermanshah (1903)
- Governor of Azerbaijan (1907)
- Governor of Isfahan (nominated 1908, but refused the appointment)
- Minister of Justice (1907), (1909)
- Minister of War (1896–1897)
- Minister of Interior (1910), (1915)
- Prime Minister (1915–1916)

== See also ==
- Iran
  - History of Iran
  - History of Persia
- Qajar dynasty of Iran
- List of prime ministers of Iran
- Abdolhossein Teymourtash
- Amirteymour Kalali
- Farmanieh district of Tehran

== Sources and References ==
- Daughter of Persia, Sattareh Farman Farmaian with Dona Munker; Crown Publishers, Inc., New York, 1992.
- Blood and Oil: Memoirs of a Persian Prince, Manucher Mirza Farman Farmaian. Random House, New York, 1997.
- Shahzdeh's Tree, A Family Genealogy of Abdol Hossein Mirza Farman Farma, compiled by Mitra Farman Farmaian Jordan, 1997, Universal Printing, Washington.
- The Lion of Persia, Mansoureh Ettehadieh, Tŷ Aur Press, Cambridge Massachusetts, 2012.

Political offices
| Preceded by Mostowfi ol-Mamalek | Prime Minister of Iran; 1915–1916 | Succeeded by Vosough od-Dowleh |
