= Mohammad Hossein Mirza Firouz =

Iranian prince (1894–1983)

Mohammad Hossein Mirza Firouz KCVO

Minister of War
- In office 22 September 1944 – 12 October 1944
- Monarch: Mohammad Reza Pahlavi
- Prime Minister: Morteza-Qoli Bayat
- Preceded by: Ebrahim Zand
- Succeeded by: Abdollah Hedayat

Minister of Roads
- In office 27 January 1946 – 17 December 1947
- Prime Minister: Ahmad Qavam
- Preceded by: Nader Arasteh
- Succeeded by: Abolhasan Sadeqi

Governor of Fars
- In office 1943–1944

Personal details
- Born: 1894 Tabriz, Qajar Iran
- Died: 1983 (aged 88–89) Lausanne, Switzerland
- Spouse: Safiyeh Namazi
- Children: Eskandar Firouz; Narcy Firouz

Military service
- Allegiance: Russian Empire (1914–1917); Qajar Iran (1917–1925); Pahlavi Iran (1925–1946)
- Branch/service: Imperial Russian Army; Imperial Iranian Army
- Years of service: 1914–1946
- Rank: Brigadier general
- Battles/wars: World War I

Prince Mohammad Hossein Mirza Firouz (Persian: محمدحسین میرزا فیروز; 1894–1983) KCVO (1919) was an Iranian prince of the Qajar dynasty. He was a son of Prince Abdol-Hossein Farman Farma and Princess Ezzat ed-Dowleh daughter of Mozaffar ad-Din Shah Qajar.

== Biography ==
He was educated privately in Tehran and Tabriz. At the age of 12, he was sent with his elder brother, Firouz Mirza, to Paris, where he attended Lycée Janson-de-Sailly. He also studied at the military academies of Russia. He joined the Russian Army and served during World War I. Firouz returned to Iran after the Russian Revolution. He was Governor-General of Fars in 1941–1942 and Minister for Roads and Communications in 1945–1946.

== Government Positions Held ==
- Chief of military mission to India, 1942
- Governor-General of Fars (1st time), 1941–1942
- Governor-General of Fars (2nd time), 1944–1945
- Chief of military mission to the North African campaign, 1943
- Minister of Roads and Communications, 1945–1946

== Honours ==
- Grand Cross of the Order of the Crown of Belgium (1919)
- Order of the Legion of Honour
