= Mozaffar Firouz =

Iranian diplomat and politician (1906–1988)

- Born: 6 September 1906; Tehran, Qajar Iran
- Died: 5 April 1988 (aged 81); Paris, France
- Resting place: Paris
- Education: Cambridge University
- Spouse: Mahin Dowlatshahi
- Children: 2
- Father: Nosrat-od-Dowleh

Mozaffar Firouz (Persian: مظفر فیروز; 6 August 1906 – 5 April 1988) was the eldest son of Prince Firouz Nosrat-ed-Dowleh III by his first wife, Amena, sister of Mohammad Mossadegh and daughter of Najm al-Saltaneh.

Born in Tehran on 6 August 1906, he attended the Harrow School and Cambridge University. He worked in the Iranian embassy in Washington, D.C., from 1928 to 1930 and represented Iran at the International Aeronautical conference in 1928. He was minister of labour in 1946 and ambassador to the USSR from 1946 to 1947. He married Princess Mahin Dowlatshahi in 1937. He fled Iran during the 1979 revolution to France and died in Paris on 5 April 1988.

He was editor of the newspaper Rad Emrouz from 1942 to 1945.
