= Farmanfarma =

Historic title used in Iran

Farmanfarma (Persian: فرمانفرما, lit. 'Giver of an Order') was a title with three different meanings during the Safavid and Qajar eras in Iran.

1. The Safavid shahs (kings) and their officials used farmanfarma (sometimes used interchangeably with farmanrava and farmanda) as a common way to address European monarchs.
2. For notable governor-generals, farmanfarma was employed as a form of addressing them, either in place of or in addition to their official titles, hokmran and vali. In the late 19th century, for example, the Qajar princes Mozaffar ad-Din Mirza, Mass'oud Mirza Zell-e Soltan, and Farhad Mirza were referred to as farmanfarma, hokmran, and vali of Azerbaijan, Isfahan, and Fars, respectively.
3. Five prince-governors and a tribal khan-governor received farmanfarma as a personal title. Fath-Ali Shah Qajar (r. 1797–1834) started this tradition in 1797, when he gave the title to his son Hossein Ali Mirza following the latters appointment to the governorship of Fars. A year after Hossein Ali Mirza's death in 1835, Fereydun Mirza, the fifth son of the crown prince Abbas Mirza, was given the title following his appointment to the governorship of Fars. In 1876, Abbas Mirza's sixteenth son Firuz Mirza was given the title following his appointment to the governorship of the central province. In 1886, the leader of the Qaraguzlu tribe of Hamadan, Mahmud Khan Naser-al-Molk, was given the title following his appointment to the governorship of Khorasan. In 1888, Firuz Mirza's eldest son Soltan Abd-al-Hamid Mirza Naser-al-Dawla was given the title, and following his death in 1892, it was given to his younger brother Abdol-Hossein Farman Farma.

== Sources ==
- Ashraf, Ahmad (2020). "Farmānfarmā". In Yarshater, Ehsan (ed.). Encyclopædia Iranica (Online ed.). Encyclopædia Iranica Foundation.
