= Roxane Farmanfarmaian =

British political scientist (born 1955)

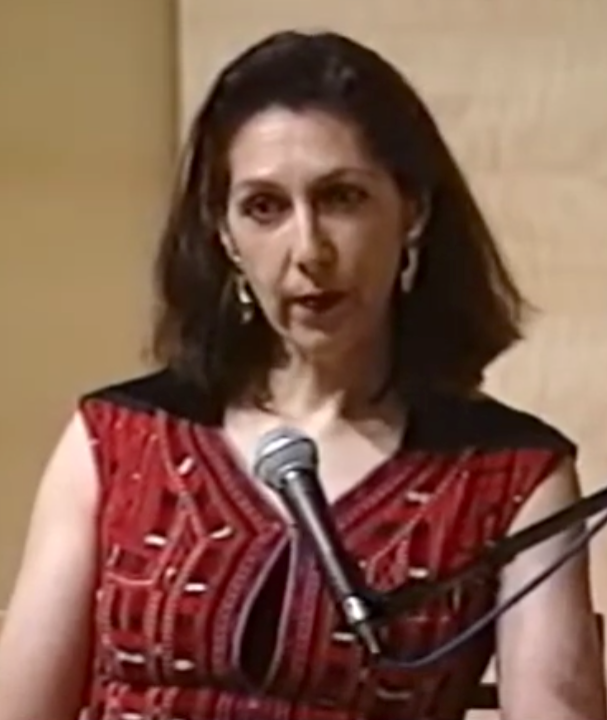
- At a reading in San Francisco in 1999
- Born: February 1955 (age 71)
- Education: Princeton University; University of Cambridge
- Occupation: Academic
- Father: Manucher Mirza Farman Farmaian

Roxane Batoul Farmanfarmaian (born February 1955) is an American-Iranian, born in Salt Lake City, and a lecturer in international politics at the University of Cambridge. She is the daughter of the Qajar dynasty Iranian prince Manucher Mirza Farman Farmaian.

== Education ==
She obtained her BSc from Princeton University in Near East Politics, and her MPhil and DPhil in International Relations from the University of Cambridge.

== Academic career ==
She is an affiliated lecturer of international politics on the Master of Studies programme at the Department of Politics and International Studies, University of Cambridge (POLIS). From 2018-2025, she headed up the Global Politics and International Studies division of the Institute of Continuing Education of the University of Cambridge. She is a founding member of the Centre for the International Relations of the Middle East and North Africa. From 2002 to 2005 she was editor-in-chief of the Cambridge Review of International Affairs. Prior to becoming an academic, she was a journalist; she served as West Coast Editor of Publishers Weekly from 1995-2000, and as an editor for McCalls, and Working Woman magazine, both in the 1980s. During the Iranian revolution, she published and wrote for The Iranian. She is a frequent media commentator on the Middle East, with a focus on Iran, and US relations with the Persian Gulf, on the BBC, Bloomberg, and Al Jazeera, among other channels. From 2019-2024 she was a Senior Research Fellow at Kings College London, and is currently a Senior Associate Fellow, International Security, at the Royal United Services Institute (RUSI) and a Nonresident Fellow at the Quincy Institute.

== Selected publications ==
- Blood and Oil: Memoirs of a Persian Prince. Prion Books, 1999. (With Manucher Farmanfarmaian) ISBN 978-1853753060
- Media and Politics in the Southern Mediterranean: Communicating Power in Transition after 2011. Routledge, 2021. (Editor) ISBN 9-781-138-49488-6
- War and Peace in Qajar Persia: Implications Past and Present. Routledge, 2008. (Editor) ISBN 978-0415421195
- "Media and the politics of the sacral: Freedom of expression in Tunisia after the Arab Uprisings", Media, Culture and Society, Vol 39, Issue 7, 2017.
- Iran's Rhetoric Aggression: Instrumentalising foreign policy through the media. Iran Media Program, Annenberg School for Communication, University of Pennsylvania, 2017.
