= Ahmad Divanbeygi =

19th-century Iranian writer

Ahmad Divanbeygi (Persian: احمد دیوانبیگی; 1826 – after 1895) was a 19th-century writer in Qajar Iran, who is the author of a tazkera (anthology of poets) of Persian-writing poets, the Hadiqat al-sho'ara ("Garden of poets").

== Sources ==
- Aghamohammadhosni, Mitra; Anousheh, Hasan (2018). "دیوان‌بیگی ، احمد". The Great Islamic Encyclopaedia (in Persian).
- Nava'i, Abd-al-Hosayn (2020). "Farmānfarmā, Fereydūn Mīrzā". In Yarshater, Ehsan (ed.). Encyclopædia Iranica (Online ed.). Encyclopædia Iranica Foundation. doi:10.1163/2330-4804_EIRO_COM_9588.
