= Farmanfarmaian =

Farmanfarmaian, alternatively Farman Farma, is a Persian surname belonging to the descendents of Abdol-Hossein Farman Farma with the surname include:

- Abdol-Ali Mirza Farmanfarmaian (1932–1973), Qajar prince
- Abdol-Aziz Mirza Farmanfarmaian (1920–2013), Iranian architect
- Monir Shahroudy Farmanfarmaian (1922–2019), Iranian artist
- Sattareh Farmanfarmaian (1921–2012), Qajar princess
