= Zabih Behrouz =

Zabih Behrouz (Persian: ذبیح بهروز; 17 July 1890 – 12 December 1971) was an Iranian scholar, mathematician, etymologist, linguist, astronomer, and playwright. Son of the physician and calligrapher Abu’l-Fażl Sāvajī, he was born in Tehran but studied in Egypt and England. In Cambridge University he was the assistant of Edward Granville Browne, British orientalist and researcher. Behrouz returned to Iran in 1923, and a year later, he started to write some plays. Jijak Alishah was one of his first plays. It was about the tyrannical monarchy of Naser al-Din Shah Qajar. His plays were mostly critical and in his plays, he criticized tyranny and hypocrisy. Behrouz usually used historical characters from the past for talking about his time. He also wrote some books about Persian language and alphabet and Iranian history.

The establishment of the Persian language academy called Farhangestan, in October 1936, occurred during Ali Asghar Hekmat’s tenure as minister of culture. The academy was initiated and later partially inspired by the work of Zabih Behrouz in developing a pure Persian lexicon for the military.

To propagate his ideas, Behrouz founded, with the help of two of his disciples, Mohammad Moqaddam (later professor of Old Persian at the University of Tehran) and Sadeq Kia (later professor of Middle Persian and a deputy minister of culture and the arts), the «Iran-Vij Society», whose series of publications, Īrān-kūda (Persian: ایران کوده;), became the main vehicle for Behrūz’s thoughts.

== Some of his plays ==
- Jijak Alishah
- Iranian king and Armenian lady
- In the way of Mehr (1933)
- The night of Ferdosi
- Medicine Man

== Other works ==
- Persian and Arabic languages
- Grandeur religion
- Writing system and culture
- Calendar and history in Iran
- tall boy(ebne dilagh)
