= Hossein Ali Mirza =

Fifth son of Fath-Ali Shah, governor of Fars, and pretender to the throne of Qajar Iran

Hossein Ali Mirza حسین‌علی میرزا
- Shah (self-styled); Prince-Governor; Farman Farma
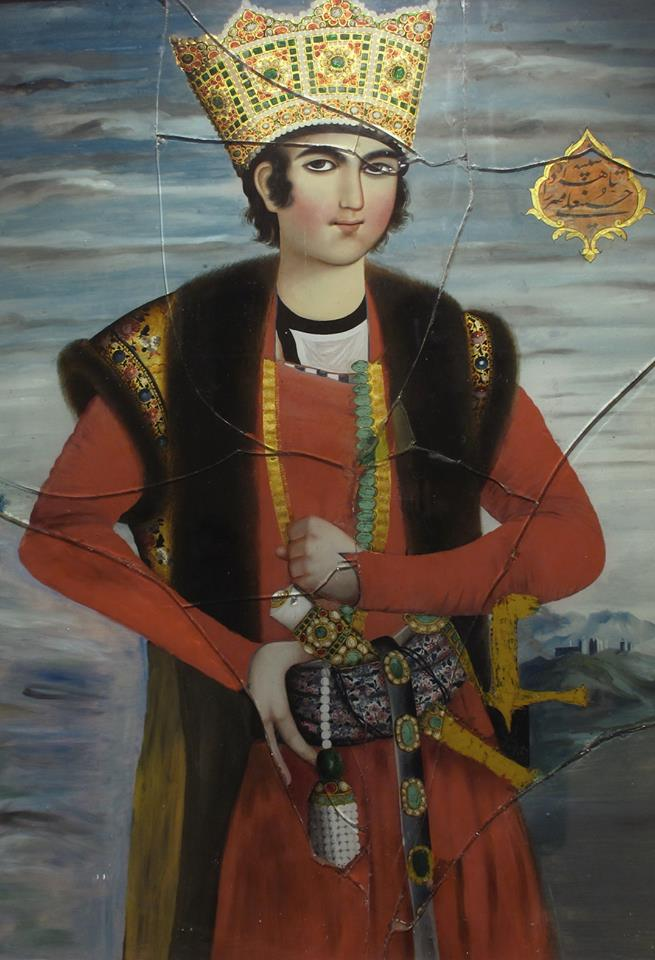
- Hossein Ali Mirza Farman Farma by Mihr 'Ali. This painting, in Golestan Palace, was broken shortly after the Islamic Revolution

Shah of Iran (claimant)
- Reign: 24 October 1834 – December 1834
- Opposing: Mohammad Shah Qajar

Governor of Fars
- Tenure: 1799 – December 1834
- Predecessor: Mohammad-Ali Mirza Dowlatshah
- Successor: Mirza Nabi Khan Qazwini
- Born: 26 August 1789; Amol, Iran
- Died: 16 January 1835 (aged 45); Ardabil, Iran
- Burial: Mashhad, Iran
- Dynasty: Qajar
- Father: Fath-Ali Shah Qajar
- Mother: Badr Jahan Khanom
- Religion: Shia Islam (Twelver)

Hossein Ali Mirza (Persian: حسین‌علی میرزا, romanized: Ḥosayn-ʿAlī Mīrzā; 26 August 1789 – 16 January 1835), a son of Fath-Ali Shah (r. 1797–1834), was the Governor of Fars and pretender to the throne of Qajar Iran.

As governor, Ali Mirza restored Shah Cheragh, following its devastation in a 1795 earthquake. He opened the tombs of the Achaemenid shahs to obtain gold, but found them empty. During his rule, the city of Shiraz was subjected to high taxation and low security. Ali Mirza gained independence from the government of Hajji Mohammad Hossein Isfahani, rented Bushehr ports to the British and stopped paying taxes after 1828, thus going 200,000 tomans in tax arrears to the crown.

After Fath-Ali Shah's death, Prince Mohammad Mirza was crowned shah as Mohammad Shah Qajar, but Ali Mirza formerly as the fifth in line for the throne, led a revolt and entitled himself as Hossein Ali Shah. After two months he was defeated in Shiraz by Manuchehr Khan Gorji. On the orders of Mohammad Shah, Ali Mirza was blinded and imprisoned in Ardabil, where he died of cholera in January 1835.

== Biography ==
=== Early life ===
Born on 26 August 1789 in Amol, Hossein Ali Mirza was the fifth son of Fath-Ali Shah. His mother was Badr Jahan Khanom, daughter of Qader Khan, amir of an Arab tribe settled in Bastam. In November 1799 Ali Mirza married the daughter of Amir Guna Khan Za‘faranlu, Khan of a Kurdish tribe in Quchan. In the same year he was appointed governor of Fars.

=== Rule in Fars ===
Ali Mirza appointed Cheragh Ali Khan Navai, a loyal servant to Fath-Ali Shah and commander of 800 to 1000 musketeers (Note: These musketeers later settled in near Shiraz and called themselves the Nuri tribe.) from Nur, Mazandaran, as his vizier. Cheragh Ali, regarded as the ablest of the Prince-Governor's ten viziers, served for Ali Mirza until his recall in 1805 as a result of various charges made by the people of Fars against him. He was replaced by Naser Allah Khan Qaraguzlu, who was dismissed in 1808.

The next vizier, Mohammad Nabi Khan, increased the price of bread in Shiraz; this led to a massive riot and an appeal by the rioters to a Shaykh al-Islām of Fars who issued a fatwa ordering the killing of Nabi Khan's most notorious extortioner, Mirza Hadi Fasai. The revolt was calmed when Ali Mirza ordered the price of bread brought down, the bakers getting bastinadoed. Shortly afterwards, Hajji Mohammad Hossein Khan Amin al-Dowla, a Mostowfi ol-Mamalek (treasurer), came to Shiraz to investigate the provincial finances. Nabi Khan was dismissed, tortured and his wealth confiscated. Over time Amin al-Dawla's influence increased to the extent that he secured Ali Akbar Qawam al-Mulk's appointment as Mayor (Kalantar) of Shiraz, over Ali Mirza's opposition.

In his 20s, Ali Mirza's authority increased, and he independently made an agreement with the East India Company, though he was less interested in governing than playing chovgan (polo). He was indifferent to the safety of his subjects; his palace was well-protected, but the city walls were broken and there was no encircling ditch.

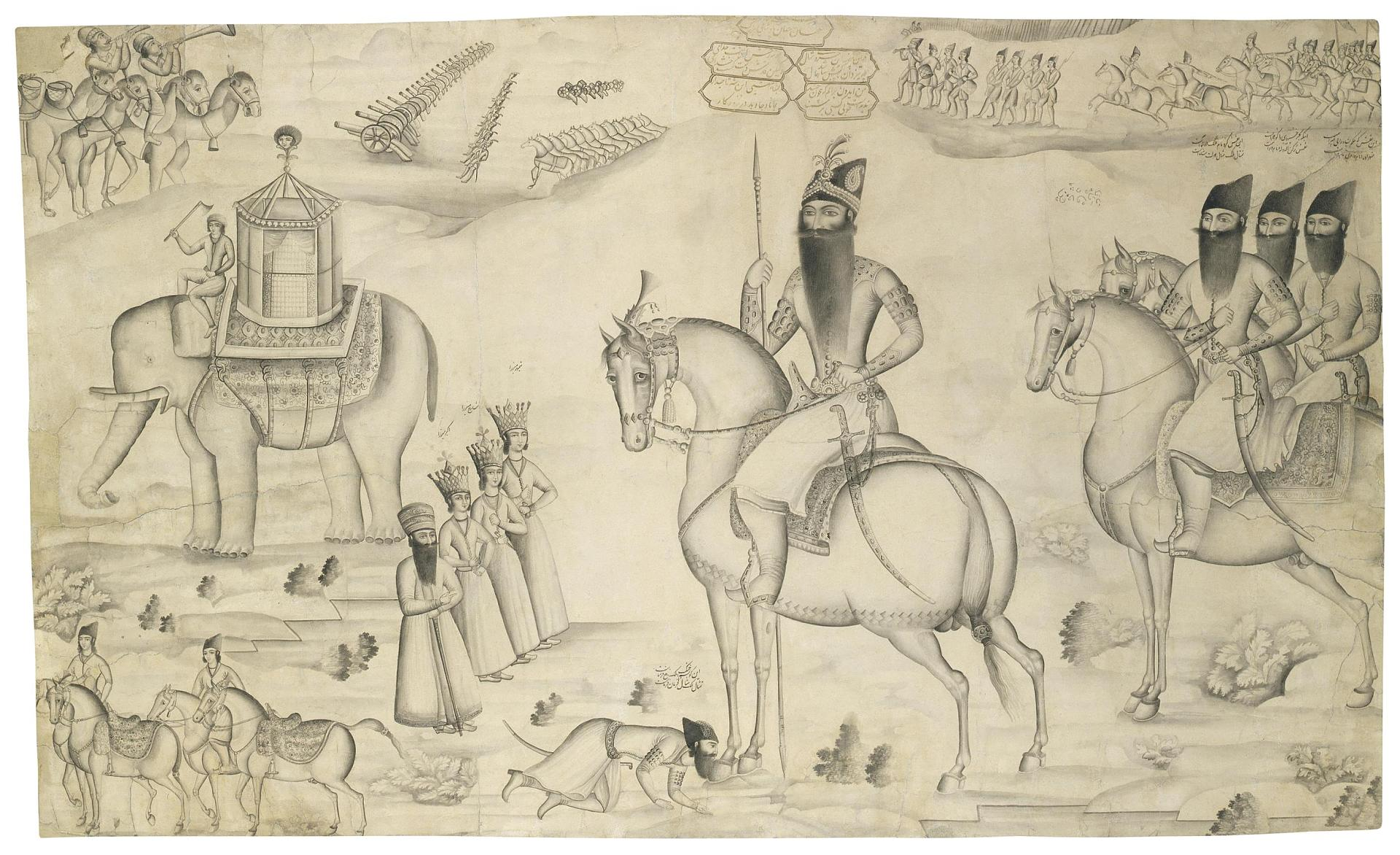
Ritual of Greeting of Fath-Ali Shah (the front horse rider) by Hossein Ali Mirza. Unknown artist, c. 1822, Hermitage Museum.

Along with Mazandarani musketeers, Ali Mirza had troops of common tribes including Khamseh, but they were not always loyal. For example, Wali Khan Mamassani and his men robbed travellers on the roads throughout Fars even though he had an alliance through marriage between his daughter and Ali Mirza's son, Timur Mirza. Shiraz was beset by high taxes, poor public safety, and fatwas from Ulama that caused a large amount of violence against Jews. Meanwhile, Ali Mirza increased his influence in the Persian Gulf; he was effectively independent from the government of Hajji Mohammad Hossein Isfahani and negotiated to rent Bushehr ports to the British. In 1827 he had a conflict with Oman which ended peacefully.

By 1830, discontent with his rule had weakened his authority, and the Khans of Dashtestan demanded more power in Fars and openly defied him. Their rebellion was not meant to depose Hossein Ali Khan, but to restore the power of those khans that had had influence during Hajji Ebrahim Shirazi's administration. Ali Mirza sent troops to stop the rebels, but those defied him, too. To stay in power, he asked for British aid. The rebels were defeated by British troops, the khans lost all of their power, and Ali Mirza gained full control of Fars.

=== Attempt to gain throne ===
Ali Mirza did not want to be involved in Russo-Persian War of 1826–1828, even though Abbas Mirza asked for help. With the Treaty of Turkmenchay, Abbas Mirza's popularity as crown prince waned. Ali Mirza stopped paying taxes and expelled the Shah's representatives.

In 1833, the death of Abbas Mirza gave Ali Mirza an opportunity to claim the throne. Ali Mirza was the fifth son of Fath-Ali but had a non-Qajar mother, which made him an unacceptable candidate. The Treaty of Turkmenchay recognized Abbas Mirza as crown prince; after his death the Russian Empire supported Mohammad Mirza, his eldest son, as the next ruler. Since all of the Shah's eldest sons (including sons of non-Qajar mothers such as Dowlatshah) were dead, Ali Mirza thought that choosing Mohammad Mirza as crown prince would deprive him of his rights and surrender to Russian demands. For these reasons, Ali Mirza sought to take the throne. He searched for allies; his negotiations with the British Empire and the Ottomans were unsuccessful. He then tried to consolidate his hold on Kerman and negotiated with tribal leaders of the Bakhtiaries and Lurs, but failed in both. In 1834, Ali Mirza defeated a local revolt led by Mohammad Zaki Khan; historians believe this revolt was fomented to increase Ali Mirza's prestige.

=== Revolt ===
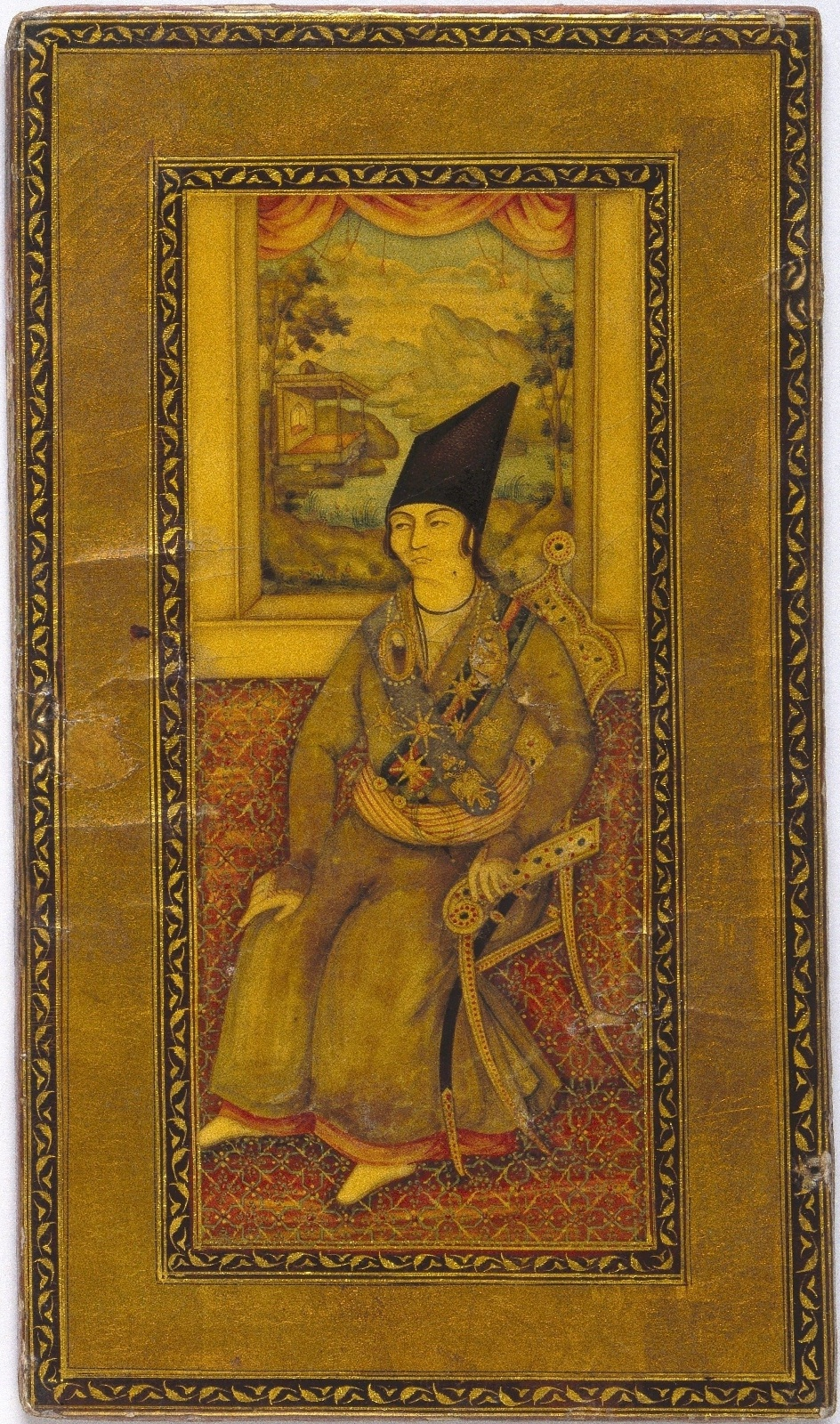
Manuchehr Khan Gorji led an army towards Shiraz and defeated Hossein Ali Mirza

In October 1834, Fath-Ali Shah died on his way to Fars to collect the 200,000 tomans tax arrears from Ali Mirza. When news reached Tehran, Ali Shah Mirza, eighth son of the deceased Shah and Mayor of Tehran, proclaimed himself king with the support of the British. He was defeated by Mohammad Shah and Mirza Abu'l-Qasem Qa'em-Maqam in a battle near Tehran.

Ali Mirza ordered Khutbahs to proclaim him as the new king of Iran and struck coins in his name as "Hossein Ali Shah Qajar". In Fars, this claim was unacceptable to the tribal khans who had once lost their power to him. The public viewed Ali Mirza as a cruel and ruthless ruler, and his claim to the throne was not supported by tribal leaders or the people in his court. In December 1834, he sent an army under the command of his brother, Shoja-al-Saltana, towards Isfahan, which successfully captured the city. With the defeat of Ali Shah Mirza, the British and Russian Empires proclaimed Mohammad Shah as king near Qomsha (today Shahreza). Shoja-al-Saltana was defeated by Manouchehr Khan and, after the battle, Manouchehr Khan marched towards Shiraz with an army that included British officers.

Ali Mirza's authority was unstable and he faced revolts from various tribes. Most of his army deserted when they heard of Shoja-al-Saltana's defeat, and he was low on funds. Without an army, Yazd could not be defended against Manouchehr Khan's attack. When he reached Shiraz, the morale of Ali Mirza's army was low and Shiraz fell in a two-hour battle after which Ali Mirza was easily captured. Ali Mirza lost all of his wealth, titles, and lands and was sent to a castle in Ardabil. Fars was held by Mohammad Shah until 1840, when he granted it to Mirza Hossein Khan.

=== Death ===
Ali Mirza was imprisoned in Ardabil. In the final days of his life, he prayed, cried over his mistakes and asked for forgiveness. On 16 January 1835 he died of cholera. He was buried in Mashhad.

== Administration and contributions ==
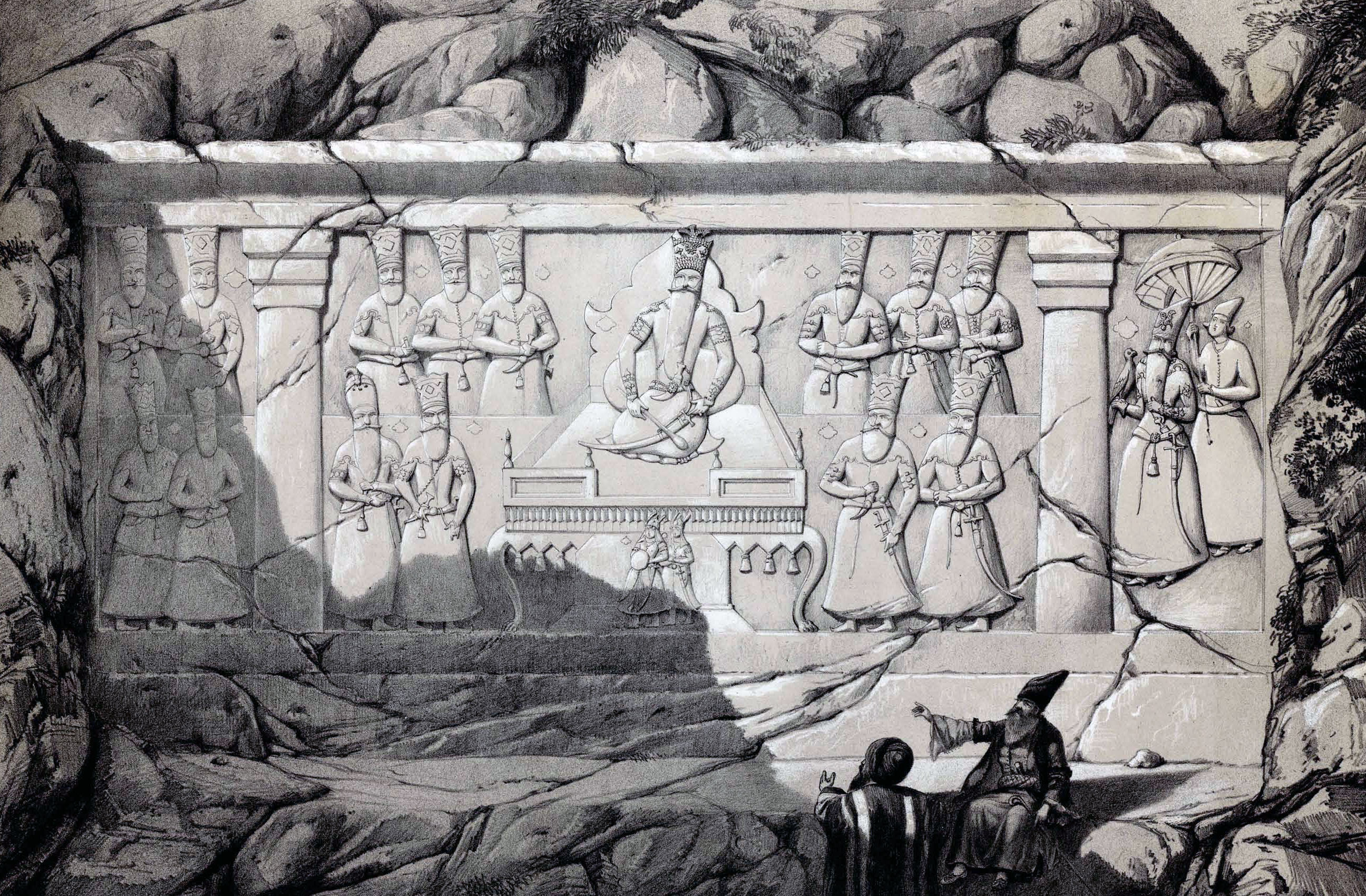
Fath-Ali Shah Inscription in 1840 by Eugène Flandin

Early in his reign, Ali Mirza ordered the restoration of Shah Cheragh, which had been destroyed in the earthquake of 1795. In 1810, news reached Shiraz that Abdollah Mirza had discovered the Tomb of Arghun, Ilkhan of the Ilkhanate, where gold was supposedly abundant. Ali Mirza opened the tombs of Achaemenid shahs in Marvdasht but discovered them empty.

In the same year, he built an Iranian-style garden called Bāḡ-e Now, with cascades and waterspouts; the palace overlooked a large, octagonal reflecting pool. (Note: This garden was restored in 1951 and became the Park Saadi Hotel.) It was described by George Curzon in 1889 as "extensive [and] beautiful" but he also noted that it was "crumbling away and the stocco and painting [were] peeling off the wall". In 1831, with Fath-Ali Shah's approval, he commissioned an inscription in Achaemenid style depicting him seated with his sons gathered around him. The court of Ali Mirza, in comparison with other princes, was very magnificent and he spent lavishly on festivals. Historians have compared his extravagance with Ottoman sultans.

== Children and descendants ==
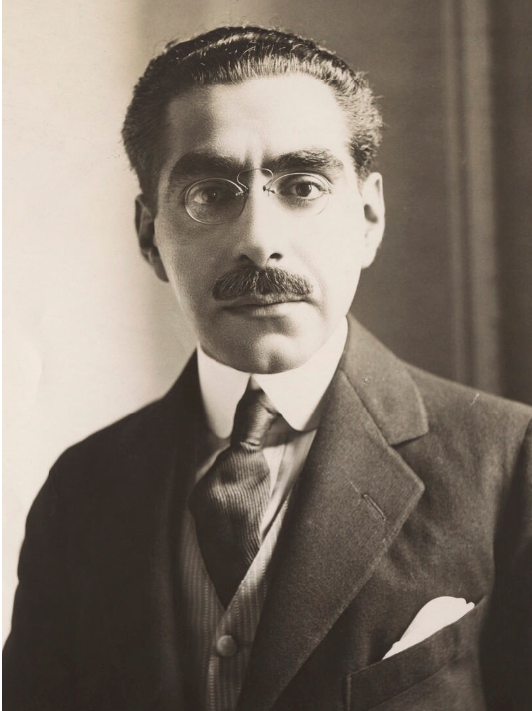
Firouz Nosrat-ed-Dowleh III, Qajar prince and Foreign Minister of Iran between 1919 and 1920. Ali Mirza was Firouz's great-grandfather through marriage of his daughter, Bahareh Khanum with Firouz Mirza, son of Abbas Mirza and grandfather of Firouz.

After his revolt failed, Ali Mirza's oldest son fled to England; the others stayed in Iran. They had titles and served as governors of secondary cities, but none achieved a position as powerful as governor of Fars. Six of his children are known:

- Reza Qoli Mirza Za'faranlu (1805 – 1863, London) the eldest son of Ali Mirza with his first wife, daughter of Amir Guna Khan Za'faranlu, Ilkhan of the Za'faranlu tribe. At the time of the revolt, he had recently married to Shokoh Jahan, daughter of Key Khosrow Khan Sanjabi, khan of the Sanjabi tribe. As the eldest son, he would be a claimant to his father's titles, and thus Mohammad Shah ordered his death. Following the fall of Shiraz, he fled to London, where he died in 1863 at the court of Queen Victoria. He wrote of his travels to London. His descendants, the Razai family, are mostly landowners.
- Imam Qoli Mirza (1806 – 1854, Kermanshah) Ali Mirza's son by a daughter of Cheragh Ali Khan Navai. A career military man, he served his father and was forgiven by Mohammad Shah after Ali Mirza's defeat. Later he was sent to Kermanshah to serve as a major. In 1854 he was killed fighting bandits. His descendants have the surname Qajar-i Kermanshahi.
- Timur Mirza (1809 – 1834, Qomsha) son of Ali Mirza by a daughter of Mohammad Qoli Khan Afshar. He was trained by musketeers and commanders. In 1835 he and his uncle, Shoja-al-Saltana, captured Isfahan. He was killed in a battle with Manouchehr Khan's army near Qomsha.
- Shahrokh Mirza was forgiven by Mohammad Shah and appointed as Governor of Kashan. He died at an unknown date during the reign of Naser al-Din Shah Qajar.
- Bahareh Khanum married Firouz Mirza, son of Abbas Mirza and ancestor of the Farmanfarmaian family.
- Fatemeh Khanum was the youngest child of Ali Mirza and married Bahram Mirza.

== Coinage and titulage ==
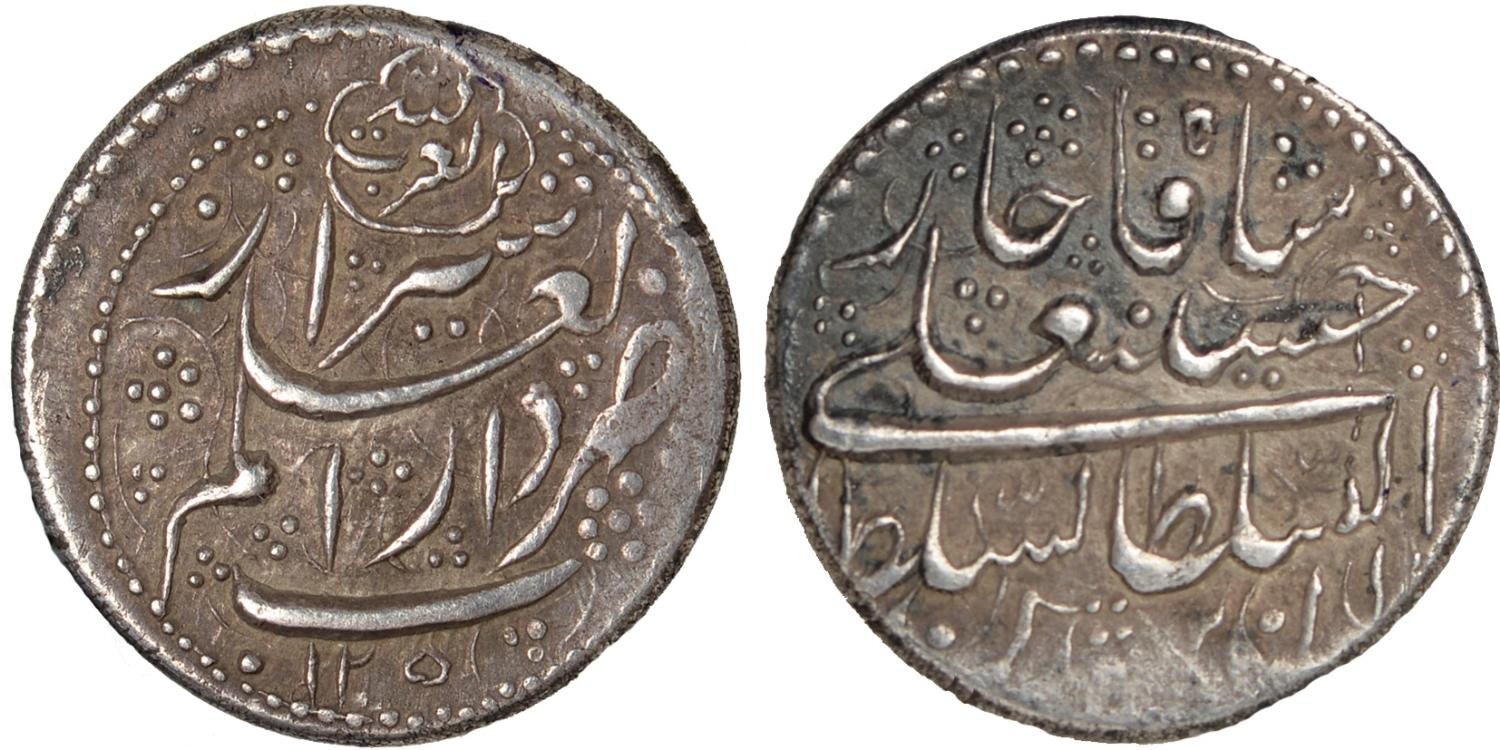
Hossein Ali Mirza Follis coin, Shiraz mintage

Ali Mirza's realm included the three main mints of Iran: Yazd, Kerman, and Shiraz. His coins are mostly follis, and gold coins were rare due to a shortage of material. The reverse states that the coin was minted in Shiraz. Other coins engraved his name as Hossein Ali Shah on the reverse and titled him as Sultan of Sultans. This differs from the coins of his father, Fath-Ali Shah, who had used the title of Shahanshah.

When Ali Mirza became Governor of Fars, his father titled him as Farmanfarma, a Safavid-origin title given to generals. Since there was no equivalent for "Farman Farma" in English, Ali Mirza was titled as Prince-Governor.

== Bibliography ==
- Amanat, Abbas (1999). "FATḤ-ʿALĪ SHAH QĀJĀR". Encyclopædia Iranica, online edition. New York.
- Amanat, Abbas (1997). Pivot of the Universe : Nasir al-Din Shah Qajar and the Iranian Monarchy, 1831–1896. Berkeley: University of California Press. ISBN 9780520914056. OCLC 44964072.
- Arefi, Raheb (2014). تاریخ قاجاریه (نگاهی به تاریخ قاجاریه براساس سکه‌ها و مدال‌های این دوره) [Qajar history (a look at Qajar history based on coins and medals of this period)] (in Persian). Tehran: Rashedin Publications. ISBN 9786003612297.
- Ashraf, Ahmad (1999). "FARMĀNFARMĀ". Encyclopædia Iranica, online edition. New York.
- Amdad, Hassan (2008). فارس در دوران قاجار [Fars in Qajar era] (in Persian). Shiraz: Fars Encyclopedia Publications. ISBN 9789649689630.
- Aghazadeh, Jafar (2020). "حسینعلی میرزا و مساله تاج خواهی در میان فرزندان فتحعلی شاه" [Attempts Made by Fath-Ali Shah Qajar's Princes for Crowning (Case Study: Hossein Ali Mirza, Farmanfarma)]. Historical Studies (in Persian). 11: 1–23. ISSN 2251-7766.
- Davies, Charles Edward (1987). "Qajar Rule in Fars Prior to 1849". Iran. 25: 125–153. doi:10.2307/4299789. ISSN 0578-6967. JSTOR 4299789. OCLC 819189725.
- Edrisi, Mehra (2014). "حاجی قوام الملک شیرازی" [Haji Ghavam Al-Molk Shirazi]. Encyclopaedia of Islamic world (in Persian). Tehran.
- Ghaem Maghami, Jahangir (1952). "گوشه ای از تاریخ ایران: توطئه حسینعلی میرزا فرمانفرما در فارس" [A corner of Iranian history: The conspiracy of Hossein Ali Mirza Farmanfarma in Fars]. Yaghma Monthly (in Persian). 46: 25–40.
- Malik Shahmirzadi, Sadeq (1986). "اشاره ای مختصر بر تحول باستانشناسی در ایران" [A brief reference to the evolution of archeology in Iran]. Athar (in Persian). 12: 133–160. OCLC 957392238.
- Shamim, Ali Asghar (1963). ایران در دوران قاجار [Iran during the Qajar dynasty] (in Persian). Tehran: Ibn Sina Publications. ISBN 9789649049229. OCLC 943881870.
- Shahbazi Farahani, Dariush (2007). تاریخ سکه (دوران قاجاریه) [History of Coins (Qajar period)] (in Persian). Tehran: Boreh Ky Eehi Publications. ISBN 9789647849500.
- Hambly, Gavin R. G. (1982). "ḤOSAYN- ʿALĪ MĪRZĀ FARMĀNFARMĀ". Encyclopædia Iranica, online edition. New York.
- Hambly, Gavin R. G. (1991). "IRAN DURING THE REIGNS OF FATH 'Alī SHāH AND MUHAMMAD SHāH". The Cambridge History of Iran. Cambridge University Press. ISBN 9780521200950. OCLC 489610138.
- History group (2013), "ماجرای نقاشی شکسته حسنعلی میرزا در کاخ گلستان" [The story of Hossein Ali Mirza's broken painting in Golestan Palace], Akharinnews (in Persian)
- Bamdad, Mehdi (1999). شرح حال رجال ایران در قرن ۱۲ و ۱۳ و ۱۴ هجری [Biography of Iranian Nobles of the 18th, 19th and 20th centuries] (in Persian). Tehran: Zawar Publications. ISBN 978-964-401-064-4.
- Khazai, Alireza (2017). تاریخ خاندان قاجار [History of Qajar Family] (in Persian). Tehran: Negar Taban Publications. ISBN 9786008753735.
- Rajabi, Parviz (2006). "کاشان در زمان ناصرالدین شاه و مشروطیت" [Kashan during the reign of Nasser al-Din Shah and the Constitutional Revolution]. Ganjineh Asnad (in Persian). 62: 85–95.
- Ghadimi Gheydari, Abbas (2010). "بحران جانشینی در دولت قاجار (از تأسیس تا جلوس محمد شاه قاجار)" [Succession crisis in Qajar government from the establishment of the dynasty to the end of Mohammad Shah Qajar (1794-1847)]. Journal of Historical Researches. University of Isfahan: 86–106. OCLC 993472864.
