= Manucher Mirza Farman Farmaian =

Iranian prince (1917–2003)

Iranian Ambassador to Venezuela

Director of Sales for the National Iranian Oil Company

Personal details
- Born: 1917 Tehran, Sublime State of Iran
- Died: 2003 (aged 85–86)
- Education: Degree in Petroleum Engineering from Birmingham University

Prince Manucher Mirza (Persian: منوچهر فرمانفرمائیان; 1917–2003) was the sixth son of Prince Abdol-Hossein Farman Farma of the Qajar dynasty and his wife Batoul Khanoum.

He studied petroleum engineering at Birmingham University in England before returning to Iran. On his return he joined the military, rising to the rank of second lieutenant and left in the weeks surrounding January 1943. He went on to work in the Ministry of Finance until he was appointed as the director general of Petroleum, Concessions, and Mines in April 1949.

In 1958, he became the director of sales for the National Iranian Oil Company. A key signatory in the 1959 Cairo Agreement that resulted in OPEC, he was Iran's first ambassador to Venezuela. In 1979, during the Iranian revolution, Manucher escaped across the Iran-Turkey border with the help of Kurdish smugglers. After fleeing from Ayatollah Khomeini's regime, Manucher Mirza permanently relocated to Venezuela, establishing a new life and a new business (potato crisp manufacturer) for himself. In his later life he co-authored Blood and Oil: Memoirs of a Persian Prince with his daughter Roxane Farmanfarmaian, which was published in 1997.

In 2003, Manucher died in Caracas and was buried in Oakland Cemetery in Sag Harbor, New York next to his brother Abol-Bashar Mirza Farman Farmaian.

== Publications ==
- Travels to Persia
- Considerations of the Problems of Oil
- Blood and Oil: Memoirs of a Persian Prince, Random House, New York, 1997.

== Government positions held ==
- Director of Sales for the National Iranian Oil Company
- Ambassador to Venezuela

== See also ==
- Iran
- History of Iran
- Qajar dynasty
- Iran–Venezuela relations

== Sources ==
- Blood and Oil: Memoirs of a Persian Prince; Manucher Mirza Farman Farmaian. Random House, New York, 1997.
