= Sattareh Farmanfarmaian =

Iranian author, social worker and member of Qajar nobility (1921-2012)

- ستاره فرمانفرمائیان
- Born: Sattāreh Farmānfarmā'iān; December 23, 1921; Shiraz, Sublime State of Iran
- Died: May 21, 2012 (aged 90); Los Angeles, United States
- Other name: Sattareh Farman-Farmaian
- Education: Tarbiat School, Nurbaksh School; USC Suzanne Dworak-Peck School of Social Work
- Spouse: Arun Chaudhuri
- Children: 1
- Parents: Abdol Hossein Mirza Farmanfarma (father); Massoumeh Khanum Tafreshi (mother)
- Relatives: Sabar Farmanfarmaian (brother)

Sattāreh Farmānfarmā'iān (Persian: ستاره فرمانفرمائیان; December 23, 1921 – May 21, 2012), also Sattareh Farman-Farmaian, was an Iranian author, social worker, and was of Qajar nobility. She was one of the daughters of Persian nobleman and Qajar Prince, Abdol Hossein Mirza Farmanfarma, through mother Massoumeh. She was a pioneer within the field of social work in Iran, and she was the first Iranian student to attend the University of Southern California (USC).

== Family ==
Sattareh Farman-Farmaian, a daughter of Abdol Hossein Mirza Farmanfarma, Prince of the Qajar dynasty, and Massoumeh Khanum Tafreshi (1899–1978; his third wife of eight), was born in Shiraz, Iran, in 1921, the fifteenth of thirty-six children (and third of nine children by her mother).

She had eight siblings, four brothers (Sabbar, Farough, Ghaffar, and Rashid) and four sisters (Jabbareh, Homy, Sory, and Korshid).

== Education ==
Farman-Farmaian attended the Tarbiat School, a Bahá'í school in Tehran until its closing in 1933 by Reza Shah Pahlavi. Beginning in 1933, she attended the American School for Girls in the Presbyterian missionary compound in Tehran, renamed the Nurbaksh School.

In 1943 she was accepted to Heidelberg College in Tiffin, Ohio, obtaining a visa to the United States in 1944. That year she left Tehran, travelling through India, and first attempted to sail to the United States from Bombay (now known as Mumbai), but her ship was torpedoed and she and her fellow passengers were rescued by British destroyers who returned them to Mumbai.

Her second attempt to leave India was aboard the United States Navy troopship, the U.S.S. General Butler, which arrived in Los Angeles, California on July 4, 1944. The following day Samuel M. Jordan who had been involved with the American School in Tehran, met her in Los Angeles and convinced the admissions director of the University of Southern California to admit Farman-Farmaian.

Farman-Farmaian was the first Iranian to attend and graduate from the University of Southern California (USC), completing her B.A. degree in Sociology in February 1946 and her M.S.W. degree in June 1948.

== Early career and marriage ==
Following graduation in 1948, she took a job in Los Angeles at the International Institute, a settlement house for Asians and other immigrants.

In 1948, she married a classmate from USC, a film student from India named Arun Chaudhuri, and in 1949 gave birth to a daughter. In 1952, her husband returned to India in an attempt to find film work through family connections. Several months later, he wrote to tell her he was unable to find work and, in effect, was deserting her.

== New York City ==
Farman-Farmaian left Los Angeles in September 1952 for New York City, where two of her brothers lived, and took a job at Cities Service Oil, one of the companies that had been approached to assist Iran in selling its newly nationalized oil.

In 1954, she left this position and accepted a two-year renewable position with the United Nations Educational, Scientific, and Cultural Organization (UNESCO) as a social welfare consultant to the government of Iraq, attempting to settle nomadic Arabic tribes in the desert. In the same year 1954, with the assistance of a Cities Service Oil attorney, she applied for and was granted a divorce from Arun Chaudhuri.

In June 1954 she left first for Tehran to visit her family, and then for Iraq to take on her new position.

== Tehran School of Social Work ==
In 1958, Farman-Farmaian returned to Tehran to open a private two-year school to train social workers, the Tehran School of Social Work and served as its director. The school was the first of its kind in Iran. Soon after, she assisted in the founding of the Family Planning Association of Iran which, with assistance from the Pathfinder Fund (now Pathfinder International), attempted to educate young mothers on family planning and the use of birth control in accordance with Islamic law. In the fall of 1958, she was called for an interview with Mohammad Reza Shah Pahlavi, who himself pledged funds for the support of the school. In 1962 she was awarded the Alumni Award of Merit by the University of Southern California. Following the 1963 riots in which many protested the jailing of Ruhollah Khomeini (later Ayatollah Khomeini) and over two hundred were injured or killed by the military, the Tehran School of Social Work was asked by Premier Asadollah Alam to identify the families of victims so that reparations could be paid. As a result of the school's successful effort, it received a regular budget from the government and was able to move to a more suitable building. In 1966 the school built the first of many Community Welfare Centers, partially funded by Empress Farah, at which classes in literacy, child care, nutrition, and women's health and hygiene were offered. Each centre contained a family planning clinic.

== International work ==
By 1972, Farman-Farmaian had attained a position on the board of the International Association of Schools of Social Work and had become a vice president of the International Planned Parenthood Federation through which she became a member of the "Forward Look Study" task force and the International Planned Parenthood Federation special mission to China. In addition, she served as a delegate to the Bucharest Population Conference (1974), the Tehran International Human Rights Conference (1975), and the Mexico International Conference for Women's Year (1976). She continued as director of the Tehran School of Social Work until 1979 when political upheaval forced her to flee the country.

== Late life ==
She entered the United States as a refugee in 1979. From 1980 to 1992, she worked for Children's Services at the Los Angeles County Department of Social Services. In 1993, she received the Silver Achievement Award from the Greater Los Angeles YWCA and special commendations from both the County and City of Los Angeles.

She died on May 21, 2012, in Los Angeles, California.

== Publications ==
She lectured widely worldwide and in 1997 established a website to publicize and facilitate discussion of her autobiography.

=== Books ===
- Farman-Farmaian, Sattareh; Munker, Dona (1993). Daughter of Persia: A Woman's Journey from Her Father's Harem through the Islamic Revolution. Anchor Books. ISBN 9780385468664.
- Farman-Farmaian, Sattareh (1977). Dar ānsū-yi dīvār-i Chīn: guzārishī az yak safar-i 33 rūzah bih kishvar-i Chīn [On the Other Side of the China Wall] (in Persian). Iran: Shirkat-i Chāp-i Pingūʼin. LCCN 2007554662.
- Farman-Farmaian, S. (1970). Pīrāmūn-i rūspīgarī dar shahr-i Ṭihrān [Prostitution Problems in the City of Tehran] (in Persian). Tehran, Iran: Āmūzishgāh-i ʻĀlī-yi Khadamāt-i Ijtimāʻī.

=== Chapters in books ===
- Farman-Farmaian, Sattareh (2007). "Broadening Muslim tradition: Bringing family planning to Iran". In Pellegrom, Daniel E.; Suttenfield, Linda J.; Collins, Patricia E. (eds.). Courageous pioneers: Celebrating 50 years of Pathfinder International and 80 years of pioneering work in family planning and reproductive health around the world. Watertown, MA: Pathfinder International. pp. 27–31. ISBN 978-0979971204.

=== Journals and reports ===
- Social Work as Social Development: A Case History, Papers from the Hong Kong Congress 1996. International Federation of Social Workers & International Association of Schools of Social Work. Manchester, UK: Manchester Metropolitan University. 1997.
- Farman Farmaian, Sattareh (1978). "Socio-cultural aspects of age at marriage in the Middle East". Journal of Biosocial Science. 10, supplement S5: Fertility in Adolescence (5): 215–226. doi:10.1017/S0021932000024159. PMID 295054. S2CID 31560450 – via Cambridge University Press.
- Farman-Farmaian, Sattareh (1975). "Early Marriage and Pregnancy in Traditional Islamic Society". In Piotrdw, Phyllis T. (ed.). The Draper World Population Fund Report (PDF). Vol. 1. Phyllis T. Piotrdw (author); Sattareh Farman-Farmaian (author); Leo A. Orleans (author); John Kantner (author); Melvin Zelnick (author); Ruth R. Puffer (author)r; Carlos V. Serrano (author); Nani Soewondo (author); Alan S. Parkes (author). Washington D.C. pp. 6–9.
- Children and Teachers. 1966.
- Country Profile of Iranian Family Planning and Social Welfare. 1965.
- Children's Needs. 1960.

== See also ==
- History of Iran
- Iran Teymourtash
