= Firouz Nosrat-ed-Dowleh III =

Iranian prince (1889–1937)

Firouz Nosrat-ed-Dowleh III فیروز نصرت‌الدولهٔ سوم
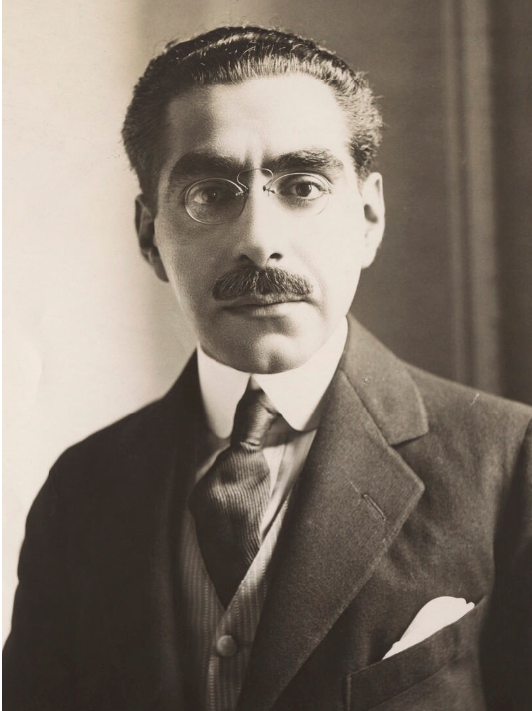
- Nosrat-ed-Dowleh in his youth

Minister of Foreign Affairs
- In office August 1919 – March 1920
- Monarch: Ahmad Shah Qajar
- Prime Minister: Hassan Vosough od-Dowleh
- Preceded by: Aliqoli Ansari (Moshaver ol-Mamalek)
- Succeeded by: Asadollah Qadimi Navaei (Moshar os-Saltaneh)

Personal details
- Born: 1889 Tehran, Sublime State of Iran
- Died: 1937 (aged 47–48) Semnan, Imperial State of Iran
- Party: Reformers' Party
- Spouse(s): Daftar ol-Molouk Khanoum (div.); Ehteram Firouz
- Children: Mozaffar Firouz; Lili Firouz; Iradj Firouz; Sharoukh Firouz
- Parent(s): Abdol-Hossein Farman Farma; Khanum Ezzat-ed-Dowleh Qajar

Prince Firouz Nosrat-ed-Dowleh III (Persian: شاهزاده فیروز نصرت‌الدوله سوم), GCMG (1889–1937) was the eldest son of Prince Abdol-Hossein Farmanfarma and Princess Ezzat-ed-Dowleh Qajar. He was born in 1889 and died in April 1937. He was the grandson of his namesake, Nosrat Dowleh Firouz Mirza, and of Mozaffar ad-Din Shah Qajar through his mother, Princess Ezzat-Dowleh.

== Biography ==
Records are unclear, but the prince is said to have been born around 1889. He was educated in Paris and Beirut. He spoke five languages (Persian, French, English, Russian, and German). As surnames had not been established in Iran at the time of his studies in France, he registered himself as "Firouz Firouz", using his grandfather's name as his surname. Afterwards, when the Iranian government made surnames mandatory by law, his father Prince Abdol-Hossein Farman Farma picked the surname Farmanfarmaian for himself and his children. However, three of his children – Nosrat-ed-Dowleh, one of his 23 brothers (also a son of Princess Ezzat-ed-Dowleh), and one of his 12 sisters (daughter of Princess Ahshami) – held on to the surname "Firouz" and became known as Firouz Firouz, Mohammad Hossein Firouz, and Maryam Firouz, respectively.'

== Marriage ==
Nosrat-ed-Dowleh married his cousin Amena, the daughter of his paternal aunt Najm al-Saltaneh. Through this marriage he became a brother-in-law of Mohammad Mosaddegh. The couple had issue.

== Career ==
Nosrat-ed-Dowleh was Minister of Foreign Affairs under Ahmad Shah Qajar; architect of the ill-fated Anglo-Persian Agreement (1919); and a candidate for accession to the Qajar throne after Soltan Ahmad Shah's exile and removal. In 1921, during the coup which brought Reza Shah to power, he spent three months in the Qasr-e Qajar Prison with his father and younger brother, Abbas Mirza Salar Lashgar, while Reza Shah consolidated his power base. During his stay at the prison, which he had helped build, he often boasted about its cleanliness. Nosrat-ed-Dowleh also translated Oscar Wilde's De Profundis during this time. Following his release, he continued his public life for nine more years, serving as a member of parliament, provincial governor, minister of justice, and minister of finance.

In June 1930, while he was Finance Minister for Reza Shah, the Shah had him arrested for accepting a bribe in the amount of five hundred tomans (about 100 dollars today). This episode deeply alarmed Nosrat-ed-Dowleh's father, Abdol Hossein Mirza Farmanfarma, who warned his son to curb his extravagant princely lifestyle. The warnings were not heeded. Towards the end of 1936, Reza Shah had grown more tyrannical and unpredictable than in the past. Eventually, Nosrat-ed-Dowleh was arrested by the Tehran police chief, Mokhtari, and held in a Tehran prison. Despite pleas from the Farmanfarma family, he was not released, but instead transferred to a guarded house in Semnan, a village about eighty miles east of Tehran, where he was held incommunicado. In 1937, news returned to Nosrat-ed-Dowleh's father that his son was dead. The Shah had ordered that he be buried without any ceremonies or mention in the press. Abdol Hossein Mirza Farmanfarma ensured that his son was buried in the Shah Abdol-Azim Shrine, where many other leading personalities of the Qajar dynasty had been buried. Not long after Nosrat-ed-Dowleh's death, Reza Shah seized his compound.

It was eventually revealed that he had been killed in his room by strangulation under the supervision of Dr. Ahmad Ahmadi. In 1940, after Reza Shah abdicated in favour of his son, the courts found Dr. Ahmadi guilty of killing dozens of political prisoners and sentenced him to death by hanging. Mokhtari was sentenced to a long prison term.

== Honours ==
- Knight Grand Cross of the Order of St Michael and St George, 1919

== Government positions held ==
- Governor of Kerman, 1907
- Minister of Justice (1st time), 1916–1917
- Governor of Hamadan and Kermanshah, 1918
- Minister of Justice (2nd time), 1918–1919
- Minister for Foreign Affairs, 1919–1921
- Governor-General of Fars 1923–1924
- Minister of Justice (3rd time), 1925
- Minister for Finance, 1927–1929
- Deputy for Kermanshah in the 4th, 5th and 6th Majles

== See also ==
- History of Persia
- History of Iran
- Qajar dynasty of Iran
- Abdolhossein Teymourtash
