= Thrasher incident =

WWI-related death of a US citizen

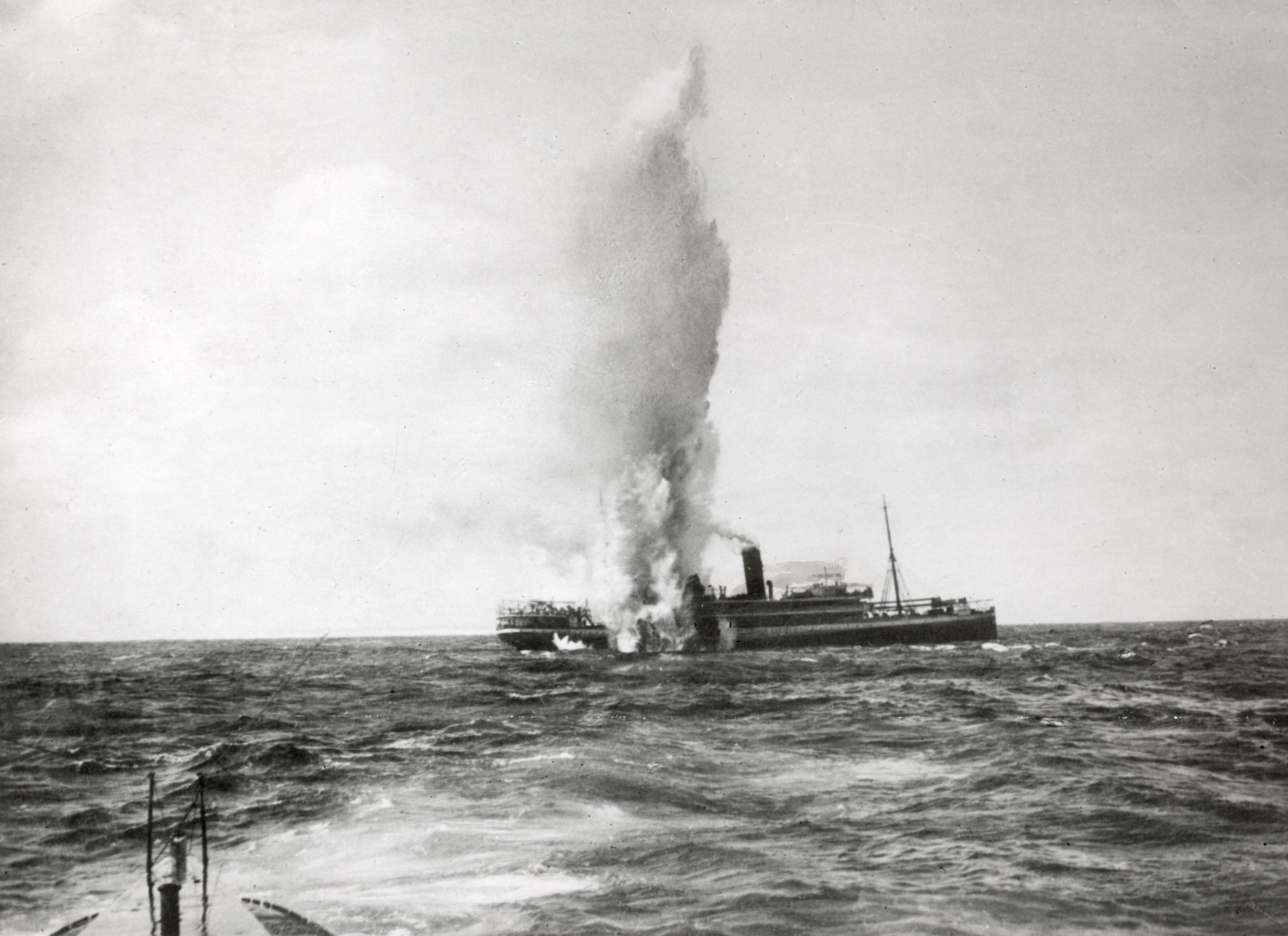
Torpedoing of the Falaba, photographed from the conning tower of U-28

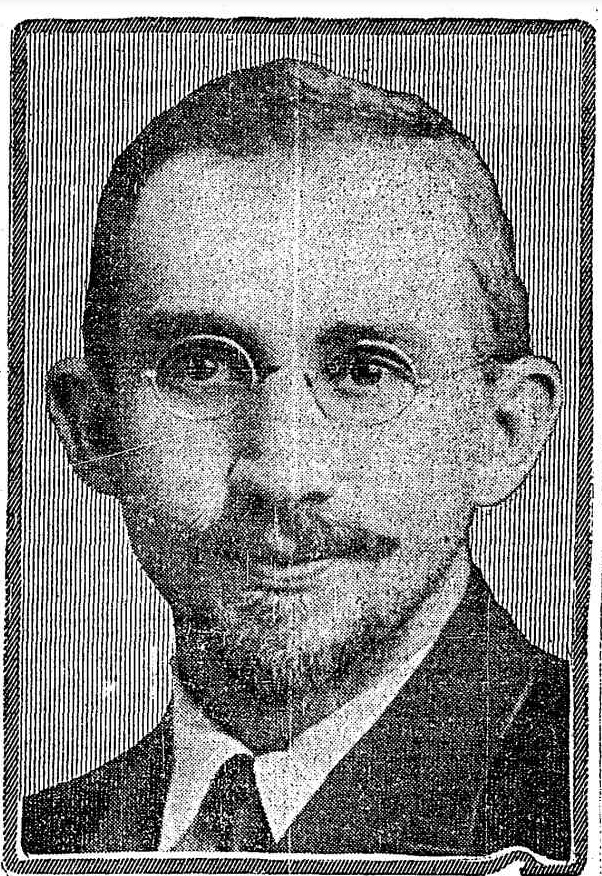
Leon Chester Thrasher, who deceased in the incident

The Thrasher incident was a political and diplomatic incident in 1915, when the United States was still neutral in World War I. The cause for it was the sinking of the British steamer Falaba by a German submarine, where one of the around 100 victims was a passenger from the US, Leon Chester Thrasher. On 28 March 1915 the U-boat U-28 chased and halted Falaba, whose crew sighted the submarine at a distance of 3 miles astern. At first the steamer tried to escape, but after 12 minutes, the Germans ordered her to stop with flag signals, which were obeyed. After 20 minutes, the Germans came into hailing distance, and gave the crew and passengers 10 minutes to evacuate. Poor handling of the life boats – three of them merely surfboats – caused some of the boats to fall into the cold water with many people. The majority of them, around 100, drowned or died because of hypothermia.

Witnessing the difficulties the British had with launching Falaba's boats, Kapitänleutnant Georg-Günther von Forstner, the captain of the German submarine, decided to wait another 10 minutes, and seeing there were still some on board the ship, kept waiting further. Receiving reports of approaching smoke on the horizon, thinking they were from Allied destroyers, after waiting 23 minutes for the evacuation, and the launched life boats already hundreds of yards away from Falaba, at 12:53 GMT he gave order to fire one torpedo. The ship sunk within 8–10 minutes after the hit. Between 20 and 30 people were still on board, and one group was busy with belatedly preparing the lowering of the last boat, placed on the poop deck. Forstner claimed he noticed this activity only after he gave the order to launch the torpedo. Survivors of Falaba claimed that this surf boat was full of people, and many died in the explosion. The men remained on board, saved themselves by jumping in the water, some of them, including captain Frederick Davies, died. A drifter tracking the u-boat and just arriving at the scene rescued most of the survivors, around 120 people from the water and from the life boats.

Following the sinking, the British press published stories from survivors which claimed the Germans misused the White Ensign, gave only an inadequate time of five minutes to evacuate and laughed at people struggling for their lives in the water. Inquiries on 30 March in Milford Haven, and in May in London led by Lord Mersey concluded, that after a chase of about 20 minutes and after waiting only 5 minutes, the submarine torpedoed Falaba. The sinking led to a diplomatic incident between the American and German governments, and contributed to the deterioration of American-German relations which ultimately led the United States to join World War I on the Allied side in 1917.

== Background ==
The Thrasher-incident – or Falaba-incident – was one occasion of a row in which German naval activities harmed US interests. On 28 January 1915 a German merchant raider captured and scuttled the US sailing ship William P. Frye. On 4 February Germany declared a war zone around the British Isles, in which the Imperial German Navy's approximately 20 submarines would seek to starve out Britain by sinking merchant shipping. The United Kingdom responded by tightening its naval blockade of Germany.

Under customary international law, attacks on civilian vessels are governed by cruiser rules. A warship may stop and search an unresisting vessel, and capture or sink her only while assuring the safety of the crew and passengers. The Allied blockade adhered to these rules, but violated the rules for a blockade by putting it up far away from German shores and diverting neutral shipping on the high seas. In response Germany's declaration signalled an official abandonment of such restrictions, though in practice submarine commanders would adhere to some version of the rules in most attacks until 1917.

The Wilson administration, led by President Woodrow Wilson and Secretary of State William Jennings Bryan, protested to the German government on 10 February. Wilson and Bryan called the German intention "an act so unprecedented in naval warfare" and that the US would hold the Germans to "a strict accountability for such acts of their naval authorities." Germany responded by issuing orders to avoid targeting neutral ships, but a number of such vessels were attacked anyway, and German naval mines in the North Sea sank American steamships on 21 and 22 February.

The British Admiralty gave instructions to merchant ships on dealing with U-boats, including advice to attempt to make an escape. Doing so has been argued to potentially qualify as "resistance" as far as cruiser rules are concerned.

== Leon Thrasher ==
Leon Chester Thrasher (sometimes falsely spelled Thresher) was from Massachusetts. He was born in Hardwick in 1884, and trained in Springfield as a machinist and master mechanic. He was described as a "mechanical engineer" or "mining engineer". He had worked for the Panama Canal Railway, and was traveling from London to Sekondi to work for a British firm, the Broomassie Mining Company, in Gold Coast (now Ghana). Thrasher was issued a US passport in June 1911, but it had expired in June 1912. At first this raised a question of whether he had retained his US citizenship.

== Journey of the Falaba ==
On 27 March 1915 Elder Dempster Lines' Falaba left Liverpool for West Africa. She had a crew of 95 and 151 passengers. The passengers included about 40 British Army troops, 10 of them officers on their way to serve in the Kamerun campaign, 70 Colonial Service officers, and 3 foreign nationals, a Dane, a Greek and Thrasher. Her cargo included 13 tons of cartridges and gunpowder. According to the inquiry this was a normal peacetime cargo for the ship. However, in wartime it counted as contraband according to international law, and if caught, the German Navy could legally sink the ship.

The Falaba was equipped with eight boats. Four of them (No. 1-4.) were real life boats for 49 people each (except No. 2 certificated for 50), three were so called surf boats, designed for transporting baggage the to shore on the West African coast, where most ports were open, without natural protection from waves. Two of them (No. 6 and 7) had a capacity of 28, while No. 5 was qualified for 29. There was also a captain's gig, not included as a life boat, could carry 25 The certificated boats could carry all together 282 people, just the number with full capacity of passengers and crew. With the gig included there was accommodation for 307 persons.

On the main boat deck there were six of these boats, counted from stern towards the bow, numbered 2, 4 and 6 on the port (left side), and 1, 3 and 5 on the starboard (right side). Hence, the forward ones No. 6 and 5 were both surf boats. On the poop was the gig alongside with the third surf boat. On the day of the incident, the gig was on the left, and the surf boat on the right. The numbering of these two boats caused some confusion during the legal process in May. Some referred to the gig as No. 7 and the surf boat as No. 8, for others they were the other way. The examination of the seven certified boats in December 1914 concluded, that all of them were in good condition and well equipped.

According to his chief engineer two out of the 12 fires under the 4 boilers were kept clean, and instead of the maximal 13,5 knots, the ship was sailing with a speed of about 12,5-12,75 knots, and following the Admiralty instructions kept well away from the usual route. The weather conditions were very moderate, with a little choppy sea. There was a light north-eastern breeze and a swell from the south-west.

== Clock settings on board the Falaba ==
As usual for ocean liners, the clocks of the Falaba were changed in every 24 hours. According to chief officer Walter Baxter, on 28 March the clocks were altered "something like 35 minutes" between 08:00 and 10:00 a.m. by the third officer. The clocks were changed on the bridge and in the saloons, but not in the engine room, where the clock used to be changed after a "Full speed ahead" order through the telegraph at 12:00 new deck time. On the 28 March for undisclosed reasons the clock in the engine room had a time between Greenwich Mean Time (GMT) and the newly established deck time, with 16 minutes ahead of the deck time, and 19 behind GMT.

The clock of the quartermaster in the wheel house must have differed also from both GMT and deck time, since quartermaster Robert Harrison remembered seeing a time – 12:22 – on it after evacuation ordered, but many minutes before the torpedo was fired. If GMT, it would be in the middle of the chase, if deck time, the Falaba would have been torpedoed already at that time even according to the German log book (12:18), which contained a true timeline. The clock in the "Marconi house" started with GMT, and this was not changed, since radio operators do not alter it at all when working to a British call station in the British Isles.

In the log book of U-28 the times were given in 1 hour after GMT, that means radio operator Edwin Taylor and captain Forstner had just that difference, the easiest data to match. 12:00 GMT had the radio operator and some passengers (with unaltered watches) in mind, for captain Forstner it was 11:00, for Falaba deck time 11:25, and for the engine room it must be about 11:41. The wheel house is uncertain, maybe had the same time as the engine room (possibly from the previous journey?).

== The mission of the U-28 ==
The submarine under the command of Kapitänleutnant Georg-Günther von Forstner started her mission on March 16 from the estuary of the river Ems with the aim of cruising in the Irish sea. The next day she sighted the British steamer Leeuwarden, which after firing three warning shots stopped. After evacuation of the crew, the steamer was sunk with gunfire. Forstner towed the life boat to the Maas light ship in the mouth of the river Rhine. On March 18, the Germans boarded two Dutch steamers transporting foodstuff to Britain. Prize crews took both to Zeebrugge in German-occupied Belgium, where also the submarine anchored. One of the steamers, the Batavier V was let free, while some of the cargo of the Zaanstrom was given back. The ship itself was seized by the German authorities.

U-28 left harbour to continue her mission on March 24. Passing the Strait of Dover, water leaked into her main periscope, making it unoperable. With the minor periscope underwater attacks were only possible under very calm conditions, but Forstner decided to continue and operate according to the prize law. Next day U-28 halted the Dutch steamer Medea. Since she was transporting food to London and her papers could not ascertain, that not for military reasons, she was sunk with gunfire. Afterwards the submarine towed the life boats into the vicinity of the nearby patrolling British patrol boats. After dusk Forstner launched a torpedo on a darkened steamer, but missed her.

On March 26 sailing west in heavy waves Forstner launched a torpedo aiming at a steamer without any signs, but missed again. At the Lizard Peninsula Forstner sighted many British steamers, but heavy seas made torpedo launching impossible.

On March 27 U-28 sighted a steamer without any markings in the Bristol Channel and tried to stop her, but she began to flee. The submarine opened fire, but due to the frontal waves had only a slight speed advantage. U-28 achieved four hits on the steamer but abandoned the chase after one and a half hour in order to spare munition. During the chase the steamer hoisted the British flag. Forstner remarked to the occasion:

"The captain of the steamer behaved in an extremely undaunted manner anyway and, if he got through with her ship, surely he deserved a recognition from his government."

This steamer was the Vosges, which indeed sank before reaching a harbour. One crew member was killed.

Later that day the steamer South Point was halted, and torpedoed after her crew left. The sinking was accelerated with gunshots on the waterline. In the meantime a steamer neared to the scene, and tried to run away after the submarine signalled her to heave to. What thereafter happened to the Aguila is controversial. British sources claim that after a warning shot before the bow she stopped, and started to evacuate. One of her life boats capsized, and two women drowned. The Germans opened fire afterwards, causing farther death casualties. U-28 fired 20 rounds in total before torpedoing her. Forstner ordered the nearby fishing vessel Ottilie to take the survivors on board. She has found three of the life boats, the fourth was found by another vessel next day. In contrast to the British version, Forstner claimed that he was firing on the Aguila only while she was fleeing, and only after she was hit, decided to stop.

The submarine spent the night to March 28 on the bottom of the sea in a depth of 25 metres, south of St George's Channel. In the morning a ship under Spanish flag was halted, inspected and let free. Next a bigger one was sighted. This was the Falaba.

According to the submarine's log book there was a North-Eastern wind with heavy seas, but the weather was clear at that time. Forstner went under to take an attacking position undetected. Cause of the bigger waves with the smaller periscope the ship was again to be detected when she was in a distance of about 5 miles. Underwater attack impossible, Forstner ordered to surface and take up the chase with full speed (16 knots) at 11:10 (12:10 GMT).

== The journey of the Eileen Emma ==
In the vicinity the Germans have sighted many fishing vessels, and their fear was, that anyone of them could have been armed. Out of the many the drifter Eileen Emma departed from Milford Haven three days before, on March 25 to the fishing grounds. After detecting the submarine, her captain, Horatio Wright decided to separate from the other vessels and gave an hour long "chase" to the submarine. Then he sighted the Falaba, and realized that "it was no good chasing", cause the submarine went after that steamer and proved much faster. He followed the Germans with the new aim of save the people from the ship.

== Sinking of the Falaba ==
=== The chase ===
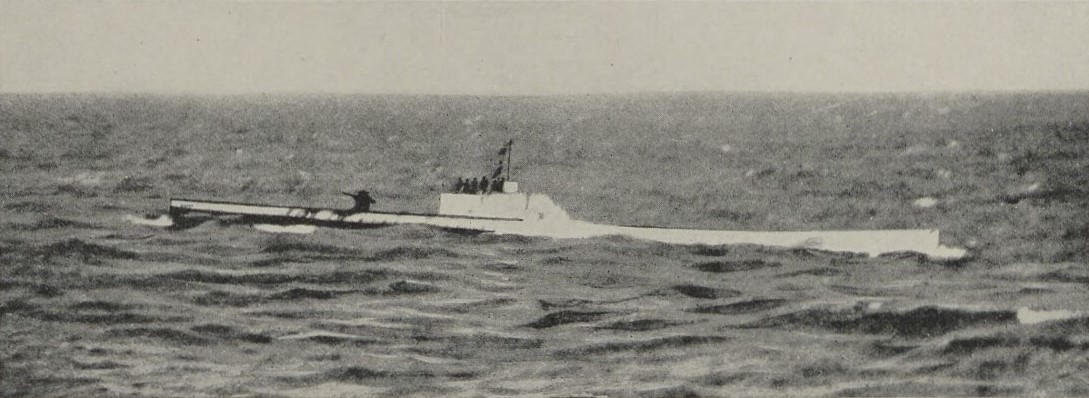
U 28 with four or five sailors in her conning tower as she overhauled Falaba, photographed by Lieutenant Lacon. Published in the Daily Mirror on March 31

At this point the Falaba was about 50–60 miles to the west from St. Anne's Head steering 216° (south-southwest) with a speed of about 12.5–12.75 knots. The surfacing submarine was quickly sighted by passengers on board the Falaba. One of the passengers thought that the submarine was flying the White Ensign, and a debate aroused among the spectators on that matter. After a few minutes, third officer Harry Pengilly became aware of the commotion, and was informed by the passengers of their observation. He at once went to the bridge and at 11:40 deck time (GMT 12:15, just 5 minutes after U-28 surfaced to begin the chase) reported the sighting to first officer Walter Baxter, describing it as a submarine at a distance of 3 miles, 3 points to the right, and adding that the submarine might fly the British flag. Behind the submarine "at some distance" a small fishing vessel, the drifter Eileen Emma was also observed. Some said, the drifter was just behind the submarine, another estimation located the submarine just between Falaba and the drifter, hence 6 miles would have been between Falaba and the drifter.

Baxter informed captain Frederick Davies, who was in the chart room, and he came out immediately to see the submarine. Observing the submarine with glasses, he soon made out that she was indeed flying a German flag, and gave an order to accelerate to full speed, and alter the course by 2 points to make the submarine right astern. More speed could not be obtained since the ship was sailing with her maximal available speed, about 12.5 knots at that time, due to not all possible fires being then lit under each boiler. According to fourth engineer Hugh Brown the clock in the engine room was at 11:56 when the "full speed" telegraph order was received, and thinking it was the signal to midday, the clock hand was set forward at 12:00.

After giving these orders, captain Davies sent first officer Baxter to the radio room to send this message to Land's End station:

"Submarine overhauling us. Flying British flag. 51° 32', 6° 36'."

According to Edwin Taylor, this message was sent at 12:25 GMT (11:50 deck time), 10 minutes after the submarine was reported. He attached a request to the message, that it is to be relayed to a "battleship". He received an answer to his message, and also that it was relayed. Coming back from the radio room, Baxter received a telescope from a passenger, and with that he realized, that the submarine was actually flying a German flag.

While Falaba sailed with about 12.5 knots, the U-28 was coming with her maximum 16 knots. With that speed difference, the chase was about to last nearly a whole hour. But 12 minutes after the submarine was reported to the chief officer, at 11:52 (12:27 GMT), the submarine signalled "stop immediately" with flags, and about half a minute later "stop or I will fire". In order to threaten the vessel, captain Forstner had sent two gunners to the deck gun, who had to tie themselves to their weapon for not to be washed away from board.

According to quartermaster Harrison, seeing both these signals the chief officer and the captain discussed the matter, and Baxter advised the captain not to risk a hit on the deck now already full of spectators, and they better stop before the Germans open fire. The captain agreed, and the engines were stopped even before the third German message "abandon ship immediately" was signalled. The fourth engineer stated, that in the engine room the order "stop" was received at 12:12 on the telegraph, 12 minutes after "full speed".

Forstner also fired a red lighted signal rocket to warn the steamer not to flee, and the steamer should have replied with signaling that she is obeying to the order. According to Forstner he signalled next "abandon ship immediately". According to the estimate of the Admiralty, the Falaba needed 5 to 6 minutes to stop completely, that means, she must have stopped already at around 11:57–11:58 deck time (12:32–12:33 GMT). Some survivors also mentioned, that at the late stage of the chase the submarine was approaching very fast. Captain Forstner, who was in the hull of the submarine watching the events through the periscope observed "wild disorder" ("wilde Unordnung") ensuing just after the flag sign "abandon ship immediately" was hoisted.

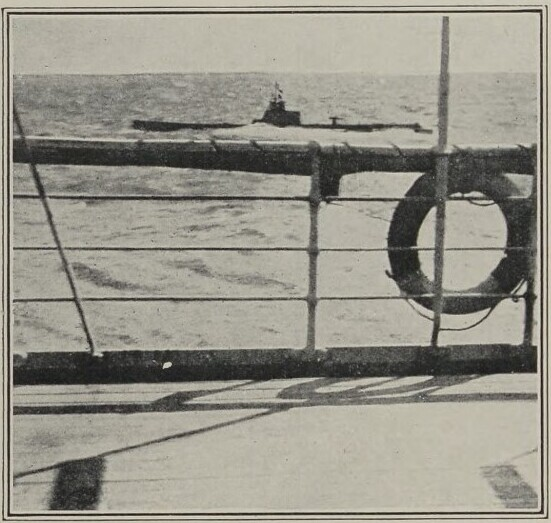
The U 28 to the south of Falaba heading east (north-east)

Some minutes after this signal the submarine arrived next to the steamer, and out of precaution held itself out of range of hand weapons, and observed, whether there were board weapons on the steamer, and after finding there were none, at 11:30 on his clock (11:55 Falaba deck time, 12:30 GMT) he hailed through a megaphone, that he is granting 10 minutes to evacuate. Captain Davies replied "Alright, we are taking to the boats now."

Hearing this short conversation Edwin Taylor sent another wireless message on his own initiative at 12:35 GMT with this content:

"Position 51° 32' N. 6° 36' W. torpedo, going boats."

The radio operator later explained this message with his expectation of being torpedoed in a short time. This second wireless message was sent 10 minutes after the first one, and evidently 5 minutes after the megaphoned time limit. According to Taylor himself, he remained 6–7 minutes in the radio room after sending that message, when coming along first officer Baxter informed him that they are overhauled by the submarine, and he has nothing to do anymore in the radio room. So Taylor left for the boats.

About that time some passengers estimated the distance to be around 100 yards to the submarine, and someone even suggested to fetch the rifles from beneath, and open fire on the German sailors, who seemed to represent easy targets. Having the submarine already that near was the decision on the bridge made to swing out the boats No. 5 and 6 on the main deck. Earlier only No. 1, 2, 3, 4 and the gig were swung out. Even this time the surf boat on the poop was not involved. The chief steward, the second steward and a further steward was ordered by the first officer to bring all the passengers on deck and provide them with life belts. Chief bedroom steward John Ellams stated, that they had to tell the passengers, that they were given 10 minutes to evacuate. Learning from the lessons of the Titanic and avoid panic instead of the order "into the boats" the order "to the boats" was given. Passengers who came up without their own life belts were provided out of the two big boxes on the upper deck.

=== Torpedoing of the Falaba ===
Event	Time (GMT)	Source
U 28 surfacing	12:10	Forstner
U 28 sighted	12:15	Forstner, Baxter, Pengilly
Radio message no. 1	12:25	Taylor
„Stop immediately”	12:27	Harrison
„Stop or I will open fire”	12:27	Harrison
Engine stopped	12:27	Brown / Baxter /Aspinall*
„Abandon ship immediately”	12:27	Harrison
10 minutes megaphoned	12:30	Forstner, Pengilly (Note: According to Pengilly the hauling was between 12:30 and 12:35, so here is shown the earliest possible to him. Baxter said, the megaphoned order was given at 12:35.)
Radio message no. 2	12:35	Taylor
Torpedo launched	12:53	Forstner
Ship sunk	13:01	Baxter (Forstner) (Note: According to Baxter the Falaba sank within 8 minutes. 13:01 derives from the time of torpedo shot given by Forstner (12:53), plus this 8 minutes given by Baxter. Forstner claims, the ship sank within 10 minutes, what does not exlude, that it was only 8 minutes as told by Baxter.)

According to some passengers some kind of excitement was arising after the megaphoned order, but there was no real panic. Some reported that there was a big rush for boat No. 3 and a commotion ensued. Others stated, that every passenger waited patiently for lowering the boats, some were even singing the song "It's a Long Way to Tipperary".

Forstner witnessed as the crew of Falaba struggled hard with preparing and lowering the boats, and more of them were hastily dropped on the water. He decided therefore to wait longer, so that all of them could be lowered and they can draw off to a safe distance from the ship. In the meantime, he slowly got around the ship, and positioned himself on her starboard side, and elapsing already 20 minutes after megaphoning the evacuation time, he ordered one of the torpedoes in the bow to be prepared for launching.

By this time the British lowered their boats, some of them capsized, or began to sink because of missing plugs. The survivors unanimously reported, that the Falaba was stationary at the time when the boats were lowered. One survivor even stated that the ship was already motionless at the time the megaphoned message was given. The first lowered (and dropped) boats were drifting slowly towards the stern, while the tide, the stream and the wind turned the ship.

U-28 took up a position on the starboard of Falaba with her stern to the ship. According Forstner he thought that after 20 minutes all the boats were lowered, but decided to wait a bit, cause he saw some people still moving around. Farther 3 minutes elapsed, when fast nearing smokes were reported from the conning tower. Forstner now – at 11:53 (12:53 GMT, Falaba deck time 12:18) – gave the order to fire. The torpedo shot launched out of a distance of 240 metres hit the ship under the davits of boat No. 1. In his log book Forstner explained, that he has noticed only after the order that there was one last boat on the poop being prepared for lowering. The explosion caused this surf boat to fell in the water. (On the German photograph there is a bigger white spot under the poop, maybe the splash or perhaps the retouched impact). The detonation could be heard even 16 miles away on board the fishing vessel George Baker, which was one of the drifters coming to rescue the survivors. The Falaba suddenly leaned to starboard, but stopped for a while, than started to sink slowly by the stern. She completely sank within 10 minutes. According to chief officer Baxter it happened in 8 minutes.

Times given for torpedo hit
Time (GMT)	Source
12:40	Taylor (I)
12:40	Baxter (I)
12:45	Taylor (II)
12:45-46	Baxter (II)
12:53	Forstner
~ 13:00	Wright

There were still 16-18 people on board as Baxter stated. The first officer ordered them to stay until he gives order to jump. That happened after a few minutes, and those people tried to reach one of the boats or catch something floatable.

After the torpedo hit captain Davies went to the bridge, and gave signals with the steam pipe, obviously to call for immediate help from the drifter Eileen Emma, just arriving at the scene. This action of the British captain mentions praising even Kapitänleutnant Forstner in his log book. The Germans did not participate in the rescuing, since Forstner has observed the radio station installed on the ship and feared, that the reported "fast approaching" smokes on the horizon came from alarmed warships. Upon this he decided to leave the scene quickly. Radio operator Edwin Lough Taylor – who was lowered with boat No. 1, and after its capsizing swam for No. 2 – remembered the fate of the passengers of a third boat (No. 6) as follows:

We saw about this time one of the boats containing about 30 of our companions capsized by the heavy seas without a chance of our doing anything to save them. So trying were the circumstances under which we were placed that one of the black firemen with us jumped overboard to end his agonies, whilst we found ourselves obliged to restrain another from cutting his throat… We ourselves were continually passing fellow creatures in the last throes of drowning, and I shall never forget the agony of listening to their final and awful cries, and watching the heartrending look of horror as they sank from sight...

104 were lost of the 242 on board. Thrasher was among the people killed in the incident. He was the first US citizen to be killed by the action of a German submarine.

=== Reactions on the call of Falaba ===
Same time as the Falaba started the liner her journey from Liverpool to America, and she was one of the ships receiving the distress signal. She was only 15 miles from Falaba, but according to the orders of the Admiralty it was forbidden to her to risk her own safety by helping other ships under attack of submarines. According to the Cymric, the first wireless message of the Falaba was "Submarine alongside. Am putting off passengers in boats." A few minutes later the radio operator of Cymric heard British warships answering the distress call.

The Falaba was just between Queenstown (Ireland) and Pembroke (Wales), and the naval bases in both towns received the distress call. There was no naval ship, but Pembroke sent out the destroyer Liffey, which dropped her anchor there the day before.

== The evacuation ==
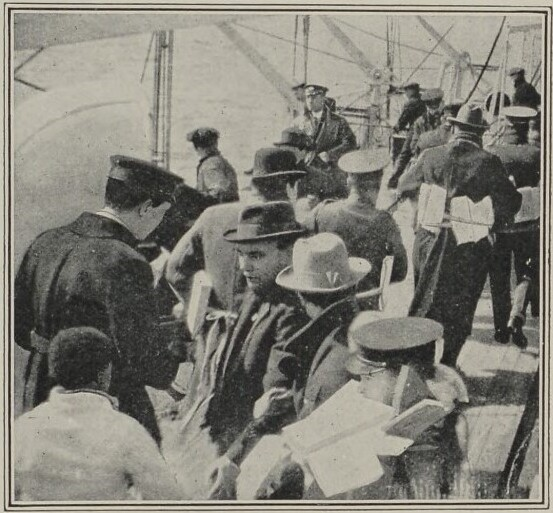
Civilian passengers and soldiers in their service-cap seemingly chatting patiently, some of them already with life belts on

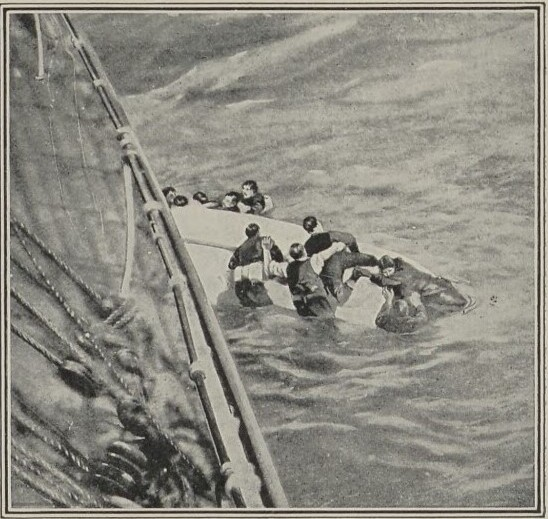
One of the capsized boats (No. 1 or 5) still at the side of the ship, with passengers clinging into it

First officer Baxter was responsible or the lowering of the boats, and after stopping the engines captain Davies sent him to the starboard boats immediately to supervise the arrangements there. Since the stop order was not given after 12:00, but already around 11:52 (instead of 12:35 it was 12:27 GMT), he might have gone there later. Baxter ordered three stewards (among them the chief and second stewards) to bring all their men up on the upper board, and ensure, that all of them receives a life belt. For the lowering of the boats on the port side was second office H. C. Hawkins responsible, and the help of the third officer.

The boats were lowered on both sides following their numbering, that means starting on the main boat deck from behind towards the bow. The two on the poop deck followed, but the surf boat on the starboard side was not swinged out before all the others had got to the water, and it could not be lowered before the torpedo struck the Falaba. Buckmaster in his opening speech in the May assessed, that the sequence was No. 1, 2, 3, 4, 6 and the gig as lowered into the water, while No. 5. and 7. surf boats' fate was uncertain. He thought that No. 1 had 50 people, No. 4 around 40, No. 6 twenty, and the gig 30 people. During the process it became obvious, that No. 5 boat was lowered even before the gig, but the solicitor general strived to make the false impression, that besides No. 7 there was another boat not lowered in time, or could not row away before the torpedo hit, and in his view this boat must have been No. 5 or 6. This was forced even despite almost all the witnesses stated, that there was only one left behind, and all the others were 100-400 yards away from the ship at the time of the torpedo hit. Also there is no boat to be seen in the vicinity of the ship on the German photograph. Lieutenant Parker lowered in No. 6 testified, that No. 4 reached water before them, hence a possibly order might be: 2–1–3–5–7–4–6–8, where No. 7 is the gig. According to chief engineer William Guy he was enlisted to boat No. 6, but as he got up on the deck, this was already lowered, so he took the boat No. 4. If this is true, than the sequence should be 2-1-3-5-7 (gig)-6-4-8.

The lowering of the boats on the starboard side happened under the supervision of chief officer Walter Baxter as follows:

- No. 1. was the first boat Baxter inspected. According to him it was filled with passengers and crew members on the boat deck. One observer from the deck, passenger Henry Kent testified, that the boat was full, but not crowded. According to Baxter the stewards began to lower it, at the height of the promenade deck some passengers jumped into the bow part of the boat, and the extra weight caused the steward holding the forward rope to let go. The boat and everybody in it fell into the water. The first man to get into the boat, Lieutenant Grant from the West African Field Army in contrary denied that anyone jumped in. According to him an officer asked the people to get in No. 1, but still no one has done so, he was the first to take place there. Seeing somebody already there, 12–14 others followed, and afterwards the stewards began lowering the boat. Grant testified, that the after falls were operated by this officer, but his attention was soon distracted by something, and there ensued a commotion at No. 6 boat, and megaphoned orders came from the bridge to that boat, and the officer holding the rope left his place, and let loose the rope, which caused the boat to fall.
  The boat bored with its nose in to the water, many people fell out, afterwards it settled upright. The radio operator, Edwin Taylor fell also in the water, but he managed to climb back. He estimated that 10 to 15 people were still in the boat, but it filled fast with water and began to fell apart. It slowly drifted towards the stern, and reaching the stern on the other side another boat became visible. This was boat No 2, which also fell into the water with 4 occupants, it also suffered serious damages. 10 men succeeded to reach that boat, and the drifter Orient II rescued them about three and a half hours later. Two men in No. 1 boat passed away because of hypothermia.
  One of the passengers, Mr. Bressey admitted to be one of the men jumping into the boat – contradicting Grant and supporting Baxter's version – and he thought the boat came down upright, but with high speed hitting the water. After that it started fast to fall apart and sink, as it drifted behind. Under the stern the water reached already to his waist. After 3–4 minutes the upper planking fell out, and he decided to leave the boat. He was rescued by boat No. 3. Bressey estimated only 6–8 occupants in No. 1. This number must be erroneous, cause 10 men even reached No. 2 boat, but like lieutenant Grant's, his testimony also doubted, that the boat was full.
- No. 3. was the next boat for Baxter, where everything went as it should. According to steward John Turton, only 25 people climbed onboard from the boat deck 25. They began to lower the boat and further 10 people climbed in from the promenade deck. Chief officer Baxter stated that it was not filled completely to keep some place free for the men fallen who had in the water.{{efn|According to James Charles Emery – and in contrary to Baxter – they only started lowering No. 3 boat when the two others next to it (No. 1 and 5) was already lowered. Emery testified, that No. 3 was lowered empty to the height of the promenade deck, and there was a big rush for it. Lieutenant-commander Heathcote stated, that a passenger sergeant tried to order out Native firemen, but without much success. Baxter himself stated to have ordered some people out of the all-up boat, and was lowered with about 40–50 in it – This proved to be incorrect, and the 35 mentioned by Turton was correct.
  The boat was only 6 feet from the water, when its ropes war let free, but the occupants endured the hard impact quite well, and as fast as they could rowed away from the ship with the steering of the third engineer. In the crowded boat it was impossible to get to the oars, and at least one of the plugs remained out. A black African occupant tried to plug up the hole with his coat, and four men had to plough constantly the water with their Bowler hats. According to James C. Emery they found some long oars to be seen on coastal barges, and here they proved to be unserviceable, and they have thrown them out along with some other lumber. They found only four usable oars.
  This boat rescued four people out of the water, and the Eileen Emma took on board the survivors of this boat first, altogether 39 persons.
  The No. 3 boat thereafter returned to continue the search after survivors under the lead of the third engineer and four other volunteers. This was the only boat that has done so, and they rescued – among others – first officer Baxter and passenger Bressey (No. 1). No. 3. met the drifter George Baker afterwards, which vessel is credited to have taken on board five survivors. (Note: It seems so, that the volunteers are counted among the 39 taken up by Eileen Emma, and not counted to George Baker, since five volunteers and at least two survivors make out seven. That way the George Baker should taken on board altogether 10 people, five of them newly rescued. (Uncertain detail to be specified.)) The boat was after this second mission was left behind on the open sea, and later was found on the rough terrain of Sprangle Beach near Boscastle, not far from the place, where No. 6. boat was washed ashore. Captain George Archibald Cotterell, expert of Elder Dempster examining the boats assessed, that this was the only boat with both the plugs in.
- No. 5. (a surf boat) was the last boat according to chief officer Baxter he supervised on the main boat deck. He was there when captain Davies came along with a lady and said she should get in this boat. But there was no more room for her, so Baxter consorted the lady to the gig on the poop. Hence it is to be assumed, that No. 5 was full with nearly 30 people when lowered. Baxter stated, that this boat was lowered all right, but the two testifying survivor of it (second engineer Peate and lieutenant-commander Heathcote), and others watching this boat to be lowered unanimously stated, that this boat also suffered accident cause of unworkmanlike handling, what led the after rope to stuck. According to Peate the forward rope was let free shortly after the lowering was commenced, and the boat got in an inclined position. Lieutenant-commander Heathcote was in the bow of the boat and hailed to the operators to stop lowering, but they did not hear it or ignored it, and continued to lower the boat, which went with its nose in the water, and the water washed many people out of it. Someone in the boat cut away the after fall, and the boat fell down, promptly filling with water and capsized. (Note: Peate’s and Heathcote’s version do differ slightly. Peate stated, that the after fall stuck as lowering started, while according to Heathcote it was much more down, and an oncoming wave lifted the boat somewhat, and the loosening of the rope caused it to get stuck.) Heathcote was hanging on the rope for a while, and after dropping in the water he clung to a little cask for a while, and slowly drifting for "some time" towards the bow, and he got before it to the time the torpedo was fired. He saw no one in the water next to the ship by than. Peate was rescued by Eileen Emma hours later.
- No. 7. (No. 8 for some crew members), the surf boat on the starboard side of the poop is most controversial. This was the boat, which was not allotted by captain Davies to be swung out along with the two other surf boats, and the crew tried to lower it much later, just before the torpedo was fired.
  After lowering the gig, chief officer Baxter came here to oversee also this lowering. According to him, the surf boat was swung out and filled with men quickly. But Baxter ordered the crew members out of it, and only passengers remained. The lowering just started, when – as Baxter stated it – the submarine launched a torpedo, which shot just between the men struggling in the water, and hit the ship at around 12.05 or 12:10–11 deck time. The detonation caused the boat to fall into the water upright, but capsized soon.
  One of the survivors of No. 2 boat, W. C. Chiswell testified before Lord Mersey, that they have rescued eight people of them with their own recked boat, but they were all from No. 1, havocked much earlier. Among the 37 witnesses there was no survivor of this boat.
  In the March 30 edition of the New York Tribune appeared a story of an unknown survivor, who remembered to be sitting in this boat waiting for two ladies to come when the torpedo hit occurred, and the boat plunged into the water and turned over. This must not be the case, since the last lady left the ship with the gig.
  Steward John Doherty, who fell in the water with boat No. 1, and No. 2 pulled him out, stated, that he saw the explosion from a distance of 100 yards, and this last surf boat jumped out of the chocks, and then turned over.
  John Turton was helping at this boat, and it was full of people, but could be only slowly raised out of the chocks because the big weight. At this point he was sent under deck, and when he came back, this boat was in the water bottom up. The investigation led by Lord Mersey came to the conclusion, that only one passenger – besides chief officer Baxter – named J. D. Bathgate mentioned firmly in his testify, that the explosion has caused the death of people in the water or in the boat. Edward Kent stated, that the Falaba was still full of people at the time of the torpedo hit, and the last surf boat (for him No. 8) either fell down, or the people fell out of it, but after the hit there were some in the water.
  The surf boat was found by a fishing vessel on the open sea, than its master sold itt o a private person in Padstow. The new owner just started to fix it when the authorities appeared for it.

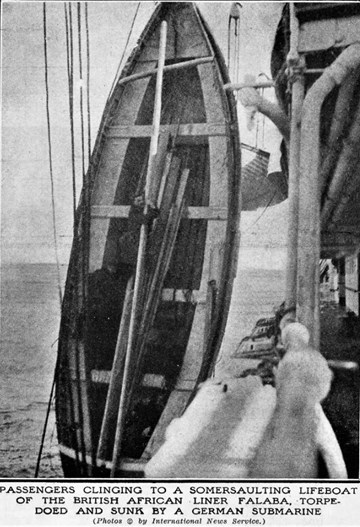
Boat No. 2 hanging on its forward rope with the two Ryders, Primrose, and W. C. Chiswell (last one in coat and Trilby hat); clinging in the banks, photographed by lieutenant Lacon. In the background No. 4 already swung out

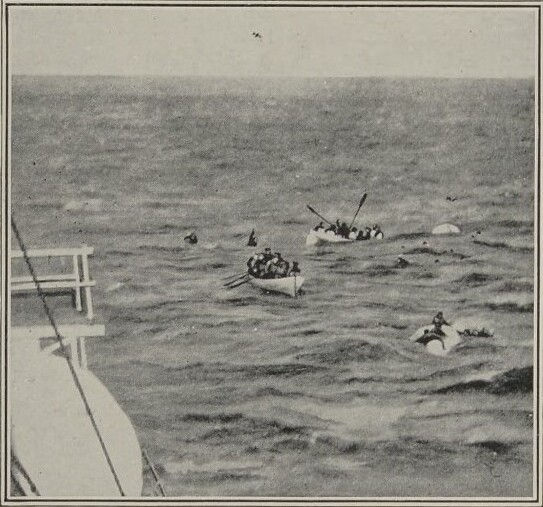
Boats of the Falaba: only two of the four seen in the photo where still seaworthy.

For the boats on the port side was second officer H. C. Hawkins responsible, and he was aided by third officer Pengilly, who was new on the ship and had no station on former boat lists. The second officer died in the incident.

- No. 2. was occupied by four passengers (W. C. Chiswell, Robert Primrose, David Ryder, and his son, David Ryder Jr.) on the boat deck. They claimed the boat was only halfway swung out, and push it out with the aid of two or three sailors. The four passengers went into the boat, but one of the sailors shouted, that there was no plug in the boat. (Another version from Ryder sr. is, that they went into the boat to find the plugs.) The four barely got into it, when the after rope promptly began to drop. The stern went down, and the stem was hung up by two blocks tight to the davit. The boat was hanging in that vertical position for a short time – long enough for lieutenant Lacon to make a photo from the four people clinging in the benches, then the ring-bolt came out and the boat plunged into the water. According to third officer Pengilly, he was there along with second officer Hawkins, and he stated that the rope was let lose already after the lowering began. According to Primrose this happened because the forward rope was still tethered, but the after one was held by a sailor, who was only a „boy”, and he began the lowering, but was not strong enough to hold it.
  Ryder sr. guessed they dropped down about 12:05 or even later, what could be about 10 minutes after the megaphoned order from the submarine. The boat 'shot' towards the stern of the ship, then – maybe driven by the current coming from the southwest – drifted to the starboard side of it, even as Ryder stated, the engines were already stopped, and the ship seemed to be stationary. The plugs were found, but they could no more be put in place, and they tried to bale the water out with their hats and caps. Drifting abaft the ship they met with No. 1 boat, which also fell in the water but with many more people, and also was drifting aft in very bad conditions. Seeing No. 2 boat, some survivors of No. 1 swam for it, and 10 of them reached it, two of them black Africans. As Mr. Chiswell told it, after this, about 5–6 minutes after hitting the water „the gunwales came away from the sides and the bottom dropped out”. One of the witnesses, lieutenant Parker observing the fate of this boat from the Falaba stated, that the bottom of No. 2 parted from the upper part, and drifted overturned in the water. Radio operator Edwin Taylor on the other hand testified, that the bottom only parted 2–3 minutes after the torpedo hit the ship, and the shockwave might have caused the boat to fall apart. Chiswell tried to keep together the gunwhales with ropes, which he found among the equipment in the boat. Among the equipment „there was a lot of poles and paint pots and varnish pots.”
  Lieutenant Grant from No. 1 boat mentioned in his account that as No. 2 started to fall apart and the tanks floated out of the boat and the bottom gave out, they pushed these tanks under the seat on Mr. Ryders suggestion. After rescuing the people out of the water, they began to row hard to get so far from the Falaba as possible, cause it was known, that the ship had a great amount of explosives on board. According to lieutenant Grant they were already rowing for about 15 minutes when the Falaba was hit by the torpedo. At that time they were already a few hundred yards away from the Falaba. Another rescued from No. 1, steward John Doherty stated, that the distance was only around 100 yards, and felt that the shockwave broke the boat. Robert Primrose guessed, that they were only about 50 yards behind the Falaba on her starboard, and only 20 yards from the submarine. Primrose's statement – and even that of Doherty – must be false, cause no boats are visible on the photograph made from the conning tower of the submarine. 3–3,5 hours later the survivors of the boat were rescued by the drifter Orient II. Till the drifter got to them, out of the 10 people pulled out of the water, two died because of hypothermia. The expert witness in the may hearing said, that it would be impossible for a boat to so dropped without coming into contact with the side of the ship, and that would have been sufficient to cause such damage that when the boat was eventually launched, that damage would develop and open up. With that it was decided in the process, that the falling a part of the boat was caused by the banging against the hull of the ship – even if the four original occupants have stated it wasn't. Just after the Orient II took the survivors in, the boat completely fell apart.
  An interesting occasion happened during the process in may, as W. C. Chiswell was asked about the elapsed times during the incident. Chiswell stated at first, that between sighting the U-boat and the megaphoned message 15–20 minutes have passed, and about 30 minutes later the torpedo hit happened. This was quite correct, even giving somewhat more time for the evacuation as it was indeed (23 minutes), but after being asked, whether there was 45 minutes between the sighting and the torpedo hit, Chiswell corrected himself, and said, that the 30 minutes was meant for that. Testifying so, he joined the other survivors, who – like chief officer Baxter – gave the interval of 30–35 minutes for the whole event, and the time window, what the committee was keen to hear. Not only according to Chiswell were around 45 minutes passed, but also a survivor named Lester Smalley, interviewed after the incident stated, that the whole chase lasted exactly 45 minutes, and even on the final day of the process a legal representative of a survivor, Lewis W. Taylor hearing the testimonies have calculated so, that around 45 minutes must have past between the sighting of the submarine till the ship was hit.
  Steward John Ellams stated, that No. 2 boat was already being lowered, when one of the ropes was let go by the butcher, who handled it. Captain Davies than ordered to let the other rope too, so that the boat falls on her keel. Ellams believed to observed many of the occupants fell in the water, and that they have thrown floatable things in the water to help them. He even thought to see, as four or five of them grabbed those. Like Ellams, police captain Matthew Harrison also remembered seeing some people from No. 2 boat to fell in the water and swim in the water after that.
  Third officer Pengilly testified, that he and second officer Hawkins were at the boat well before people got into it. According to him the after fall was let go just when the lowering began. Just after that he was entrusted with burning the secret papers, so he left with documents for the boiler room. When he got up again, he saw No. 4 boat on the water already at some distance from the ship, but No. 2 still hanging on one rope. At the end of this unlikely storytelling Pengilly stated, that he and Captain Davies lowered the boat carefully, and they managed to do it so, that no water spilled in, and more people could get in climbing down on the rope. After that he went to the No. 6 boat.
- No. 4 was the next to be lowered on the left side. Hugh Brown fourth engineer arriving here found the rope of the after falls jammed, and the ropes twisted. Captain Davies came along, and with the assistance of a passenger and second officer Hawkins they cleared it. Captain Davies and Hawkins lowered the boat to the saloon deck, where people got in, and was than lowered safely onto the sea. William Guy chief engineer took charge of the boat with 35 passengers and crew as most senior officer. Captain Davies ordered Brown also to get in the boat already with cleared falls, and Brown than climbed down on one of the ropes, and was fished out by the chief engineer. After that, he took charge from him over the boat with 35 passengers and crew, but soon it turned out, that there was another man called Brown in the boat, who was a master mariner, and ultimately he the command was given to him.
  The boat was driven by the wind towards the bow of the ship, and collided a few times against boat No. 6, which was lowered afterwards, pushing it against the hull of the Falaba. After that they tried get away from the ship, while the wind and the stream drove them to the starboard side of the bow of the Falaba. Here they met with the Eileen Emma well before the Falaba was torpedoed. Passing by, the drifter offered them to take them on board, but they answered, that they are safe, and the fishermen should rescue the people out of the water first. Chief engineer Guy and a passenger named Woolley guessed their distance from the Falaba 300 yards at the time when the torpedo was fired.
  J. C. Watt from No. 4 boat testified, that they tried for long to approach No. 2 boat to take over a dying man, but failed to get near enough with the waves getting rougher. The plugs were all in their place, but even so the water slowly leaked in. When the water was 6 inches high, a lady began to bail it out, but not soon after, two hours after it was lowered, the Eileen Emma came and took the people on her board. (Note: According to bedroom assistant steward Frank Breary the distance was 200 yards from the Falaba when torpedoed. – Proceeding 67. (2854–2855.). Fourth engineer Brown guessed it was only 150 yards. – Proceedings p. 64. (2686.). Breary told, that the Eileen Emma was 100 yards from the Falaba when the torpedo was fired, but the captain of the drifter, Horatio Wright stated, his ship was still 300 yards away. – Proceedings p. 76. (3280–3281.) Out of these informations it is assumable, that chief engineer Guy’s and Woolley’s estimation has to be more correct than that of the other two, and maybe even their guess was less than the distance really was.)
  In the legal process led by Lord Mersey big attention was aroused the accusation of police captain Matthew C. C. Harrison's, who stated to have been swimming in the water for more than an hour when he begged for help from No. 4, but he was denied even seemingly not full with the answer „We have got no rom here, but you will find a trawler boat.” The occupants also during the process defended themselves stating, there was no more room, cause they had some people rescued out of the water in the boat, who were in bad shape and laid down. Harrison was rescued after spending about three hours in the water.
  No. 4 boat was also found in Cornwall, near Boscastle on the Conclave Beach, three miles north of the point where No. 3 was found.
- No. 6 boat was according to many observations the last boat to be lowered, even later than the gig on the same side on the poop, which was already swung out before. Seeing, that one of the boats was in trouble, (Note: In Proceedings is to be read, that the boat which „capsized” was No. 4, but obviously it was No. 2.) one of the officers ordered the civilians busy at this boat to let in as much people in No. 6 boat as possible(„Stand by No. 6 and let as many as can get in her”). About 40 people got into the boat with place for only 28. All the occupants were passengers, and after giving his rope to one of the passengers, the boat was also lowered by two passengers, by Mr. Emmerton and by lieutenant Lacon, who made the photographs shown in this article.
  The boat could be successfully lowered despite being overloaded. During the lowering process second lieutenant C. W. H. Parker still saw the U-Boot on the port side of the Falaba, as she was heading to the starboard side of the cargo liner. As Parker put it, the wind was blowing from the stern and driven by it, No. 4 boat collided with their No. 6 boat, pushing it against the hull, and even so no damage was done by it, water began to leak in. Than somebody shouted, that the plug was missing. They tried to stop the leaking by putting handkerchiefs and gloves into the plug holes, but without much success. They also tried to bail out the water with a bin, but this was insufficient because of the little sweep for it. Three oars were only found in the boat, and with them they tried to maneuver against the waves, so that the water does not come from the side into the boat, but they failed to bring it under control with only three oars. Just as they tried to replace the oars to achieve a better manoeuvering, when a wave got them from the side, and five minutes afterwards the boat sank. Other survivors from the boat, Harrison and Wilfred Austin stated, that the boat was only 15–20 minutes long seaworthy. The boat was before the Falaba when sunk, but at that time the cargo liner was already sunk too, and the submarine was nowhere to bee seen by then. (Note: According to Nottelmann and Langensiepen, No. 6 had to be left before the torpedo hit, but with regard of these statements this information seems to be false.)
  Parker was rescued after about 90 minutes by the drifter Wenlock, Wilfred Austin was pulled out by the dinghi os the Eileen Emma, and handed over to the drifter Emulate.
  Police officer Matthew C. C. Harrison remarked, that No. 6 boat was absolutely rotten, and this circumstance enhanced its sinking. He complained, that it wasn't even a real life boat, but a surf boat without any necessary equipment, and in its condition „was not capable of holding more than about a dozen people.”
  Third officer Pengilly testified misleading regarding No. 6. He stated, that he was holding the after fall of the boat, and the other was handled by two passengers. While lowering it he looked around he reminded to see the gig sailing away and the surf boat on the poop was just being swung out, when he noticed the wake of a torpedo. According to him the ship suddenly began to list starboard after the explosion, and that caused the boat to graze the ships side, even before reaching the promenade deck. The boat reached the water in good order, and Pengilly thought it suffered no damages. Later he saw this boat capsized, but could not tell, what caused it. This account is in contrast with the narrations of the survivors of No. 6 boat, who said, that they drew off from the Falaba considerable time before the torpedo hit.
  This boat was found later on the rocky shoreline of Rosycliff Beach near Boscastle.
- The Captain's gig (officially No. 8, but for the crew No. 7) was the only one boat besides the four ordinary life boats that was already swung out when the submarine appeared. Half a dozen coloured crew member took place in the boat early, who were ordered out by quartermaster Harrison, and put passengers in instead. Such developments could be made out from the submarine according to the German log book. The gig was lowered after all the big life boats were already on the water. Its lowering was delayed cause one last lady had to brought up and she was placed in this boat. Finally the gig was lowered by chief officer Baxter and the purser, and drew off with about 18-20 people, among them with the fourth officer. Quartermaster Harrison mentioned, that he was the only seaman in this boat, and with rowing they could make only about 20 yards. But by the time the torpedo hit the Falaba, they were drifted already 150 yards from her, before her bow on the starboard. Harrison thought it was because while the gig remained in place, the ship was moving and turning.
  The survivors of the gig were rescued by Eileen Emma.
  The gig was left to its fate, and later was found on the sandy shore of Holywell Beach at New Quay, in Cornwall.
- The jumpers (those, who remained on the ship till the torpedo hit) presented the last distinct group. The majority of them gathered on the poop, where they were about to get in the last remaining boat, the starboard surf boat. According to chief officer Baxter only 16–18, crew members only, remained on board after this boat fell down. He called their attention not to jump to early in the water, and ordered them to throw floatable things into the sea, so they can hold on something till help arrives. He waited for the perfect moment (12:15 deck time), and than ordered „Jump!” for his men, and all of them obeyed. Baxter, and three passengers were rescued 2-2,5 hours later by No. 3 boat, which alone from all the launched boats turned back to pull out other survivors. Some of the „jumpers” drowned, or died after their rescue caused by hypothermia. Among them was Captain Davies, a man named Henderson from the Nigeria Maritime Department, and apparently second officer H. C. Hawkins.
  After the explosion captain Davies went back to the bridge, and began to give signals with the steam whistle to inform the already nearby drifter, the Eileen Emma about his ship's situation. Korvettenkapitän Forstner also mentioned in his log book, that the British captain showed up an exemplary behavior at this stage of events. The Germans thought, he sank with his ship, but he jumped from with the very last remaining people, and died soon after his rescue.

=== Rescuing the survivors ===
At the time of the torpedo hit the sea was quite calm, but soon after the Falaba sank the sea got very choppy, and this deteriorated the chances of survival. The oil spoiling out of the cargo liner moderated somewhat these waves. The drifters coming to rescue the shipwrecked were all fishing on the North Sea before the war, but because of the naval mines and presence of enemy ships they had to change fishing area, and so they changed to the seemingly still peaceful Irish Sea. According to her captain, Horatio Wright, the drifter Eileen Emma following the submarine arrived on the scene while the Germans waited the Falaba to be evacuated, and launched her dinghi for pulling out survivors from the water even before the torpedo was fired. At the time of the torpedo hit she was about 300 yards from the Falaba and 1 or 2 minutes later she had pulled out the first shipwrecked persons. This ship has rescued the majority of the people, 122 in number. Captain Wright stated, that 40 of them were pulled out of the water. (Note: The Eileen Emma has taken on board the occupants of boats No. 3, 4, and of the gig, which carried alltogether about 100 people. No. 3 carried 39, the gig about 18-20, and No. 4 is said to carry about 40. The former two data are quite sure, for No. 4 there are only estimations. If correct, than the drifter could have saved only about 20–23 instead of 40 as Captain Wright stated. If Wright’s account is correct, than No. 4 boat had only about 24–25 on board. (More information needed.)) 6 of the rescued on Eileen Emma died soon afterwards because of hypothermia. Her captain, Horatio Wright explained, that he has been „chasing” the submarine for an hour, and was only 300 yards (270 m) from the starboard bow of the Falaba when the torpedo was fired. In the inquiry led by Lord Mersey in May he stated, that her first life boat was already being lowered when the explosion occurred, and one or two minutes later the first persons were already pulled out of the water, (Note: Two of the survivors stated like the captain of the Eileen Emma, that the drifter was already at the scene before the torpedo hit. Edward Kent testified, that she was there just as the Falaba sank, and the submarine left the scene. (Proceedings p. 51–53.), while Hugh Brown said, she was there even before the torpedo was fired. (Proceedings p. 64–65.) Survivors testifing in the May inquiry stated, that they were rescued between 1–3,5 hours after the ship was sunk.) after No. 4 boat rejected his offer to save them, arguing, he should care about the people drifting in the water first. (Note: Even Langensiepen & Nottelmann in their 2015-article were doubting, that the Eileen Emma could have been so close, although it supported their view, that the timeline in the German log book was correct.)

Forstner does not hurt the drifter – after Langensiepen & Nottelmann's presumption on humanitarian grounds haven't sunk her, to let her rescue the shipwrecked. Beyond the 122 rescued by the Eileen Emma, further 14 were rescued by the Orient II (with the 12 survivors on No. 2 boat), 5 by the George Baker, 8 by the Wenlock and 3 by The Emulate, latter 3 were taken on board from the dinghi of the Eileen Emma.

The survivors were taken to Milford Haven. The Eileen Emma met with HMS Liffey on her way there, and the destroyer has taken on board most of the survivors. Reaching the port, she handed them over to the tug boat Atlanta, which landed them at around 23:00. The last survivors arrived at 02:30. Eight bodies were landed, among them Captain Davies and two soldiers (lieutenant Blakeney and sergeant Ernest Wallace).

According to the Naval Staff Monographs 46 of the 95 crew members and 57 of the 147 passengers lost their lives, altogether 103. In the Proceedings 48 crew members and 93 passengers are mentioned as rescued, and 47 crew members and 54 passengers as deceased, 101 victims in all. It is uncleared how many lost their lives due to the torpedo-explosion, or whether there were any. During the process in May there were some suggestions in that way, but the causes of death were always treated as drowning., and also The Naval Staff Monographs calls the causes generally as drownings, although mentions some died in the explosion.

According to the British report it was unknown how many victims on which class travelled, but Elder Dempster published a partial list two days after the tragedy mentioning, that out of the survivors 52 were first class, 34 second class passengers, while 49 crew members stayed alive, 3 suffered shrapnel wounds.

A passenger, Lieutenant Charles Lacon of the Warwickshire Regiment has made several photos on board the Falaba after U-28 appeared, which survived even after spending one hour in the water. The pictures were published already after three days, on 31 March by the Daily Mirror. The journal paid Lacon 200 pounds for them, and remarked that everyone should be prepared and hold a camera by himself for such occasions, because the editorial office would pay good money for the photographs. There is a German photograph from the moment of the torpedo hit too, which contradict several of the claims made by Falaba's survivors.

The majority of the survivors, 83 men were housed in the Bethel of the town, while the six women were allocated in different houses. The local Red Cross helped to care about them, blankets were sent down from Fort Hubberston. On Monday the survivors were moving freely in the town, and many told their accounts of what happened to them. Chief officer Walter Baxter was allocated in the George and the Dragon Hotel, and he refused to meet with the reporters.

Many reports of the survivors were published by the British press. Based on these accounts The Western Telegraph reported, that the overhauling submarine ordered the cargo liner with three whistles to stop and evacuate, but before all the boats could be lowered, a torpedo was fired at 13:15. The first boat went up, and according some accounts a second torpedo smashed the second and third boats, although the fourth was able to get away safely. Some survivors stated, that the Germans were laughing at the shipwrecked. The captain of the Eileen Emma said, that he took notice of the submarine at 12:15 (GMT), and realising he was up to mischief, he chased her in hope of running her down. An hour later he sighted the liner, and he tried to get near to the submarine and finish her off. Seeing his intentions, the Germans fired a torpedo on the steamer out of a range of 200–300 yards. At this time the Eileen Emma was only 200 yards from the submarine. According to the report „the pirates” waited for a while to see whether the ship will sink, and than left the scene. The drifter began to rescue the shipwrecked.

The Elder Dempster paid the costs of the survivors to reach their destinations, because most of them didn't have the time to take their money with them. The majority of them left Milford Haven with train.

== Aftermath ==
Falaba was the second British passenger ship that U-28 had sunk in as many days. On 27 March it had sunk Yeoward Brothers' steamship Aguila, also with considerable loss of life. U-28 was reported to have fired its deck gun at Aguila, inflicting casualties, including as her passengers and crew were abandoning ship.

Wilson thought U-28 had violated international law, the key point being the short amount of time given to evacuate the ship, but Bryan questioned "whether an American citizen can, by putting his business above his regard for his country, assume for his own advantage unnecessary risks and thus involve his country in international complications."

Wilson had Counselor Robert Lansing draft a diplomatic complaint to the Germans:

The Government of the United States has received a report, confirmed by substantial evidence, that Leon C. Thrasher, a native born American citizen, came to his death by reason of the act of the German naval authorities in sinking the British passenger steamer Falaba on the high seas on the 28th of March, 1915, outward bound from Liverpool, and the failure of the commander of the German submarine U–28 to give ample time for the crew and passengers of the Falaba to leave the vessel before sinking her by means of torpedoes. It is further reported that, at the time when the Falaba was torpedoed and sunk, she was lying to, making no attempt to escape and offering no resistance.

[...]

It sincerely hopes that the Imperial Government, recognizing the justice of these representations, will promptly disavow the act complained of and take the steps necessary to prevent its repetition.

— Robert Lansing, April 5, 1915

Bryan advised Wilson to not send a note in such bellicose terms, and had Lansing redraft the note. It was noted that only one American was killed, thus grounds for a legal protest was weak. The decision was made to leave off a formal protest for the time being, as Thrasher may be simply an isolated incident.

Two attacks followed: one, an air attack on the Cushing, and then a submarine attack on an American tanker, the Gulflight. On 7 May a U-boat sank RMS Lusitania. The incident was a great deal more severe, as the U-boat had this time attacked with no warning at all. Many people, including over a hundred US citizens, died in the shipwreck. The US sent a diplomatic note to Germany asking for an apology and reparations for both ships. The note included a warning that the US would take "any necessary act in sustaining the rights of its citizens or in safeguarding the sacred duties of international law."

The Lusitania sinking brought up the Thrasher case again. The Germans claimed that they had given the ship ample time to evacuate (10 minutes, extended to 23), and that they had been forced to sink the ship due to the approach of "suspicious vessels". This point was brought up by Bryan in his discussions with Wilson. The German government also contended that if a merchant ship tries to escape capture and seek assistance, that alters the duty of the commander of the attacking vessel to try to ensure the safety of non-combatants aboard the merchant ship, even after the ship subsequently stops and ceased resistance. The US government rejected this contention.

Thrasher's body washed ashore on the coast of Ireland on 11 July 1915, after it had been in the sea for 106 days. At first, authorities mistook him for a Lusitania victim and designated him Body No. 248. During the subsequent British inquiry led by Lord Mersey, which ended in July, one of the passengers claimed they were angry at the "bungled" evacuation, alleging that had the crew been well organized and the passengers well led, all of those on the ship could have been safely evacuated before the torpedo was fired. The passenger thus blamed Elder, Dempster, their Marine Superintendent and his brother-in-law Fred Davies for the loss of life. Mersey ultimately found that the ship only had five minutes to evacuate, thus placing all of the blame on the U-boat captain. Many later authors suspect the true amount of time given to evacuate was likely around 10 minutes, in between the British and German claims. Journalist and Lusitania conspiracy theorist Colin Simpson claims the torpedo may have detonated the Falaba's cargo, but the inquiry at the time did not believe this was an issue.

== See also ==
- Gore–McLemore resolutions
- Sinking of the RMS Lusitania
- Cruiser rules

== Bibliography ==
- Proceedings before The Right Honourable Lord Mersey on a Formal Investigation ordered by the Board of Trade into the Loss of the Steamship "Falaba". London: Darling and Son. 1915. (pages 1–100)
- Shipping Casualties – Loss of the steamship "Falaba". London: Darling and Son. 1915.
- Langensiepen, Bernd; Nottelmann, Dirk (2024). "Die Versenkung der FALABA am 28. März 1915 oder – gute Seemannschaft kann Leben retten!". Historisches Marinearchiv.de.
- von Mantey, Ewald (1933). Der Krieg zur See 1914–1918 – Der Handelskrieg mit U-Booten Bd. 2. Berlin: E. S. Mittler und Sohn. (pages 47–49.)
- Naval Staff Monographs Vol. XIII. Naval Staff – Training and Staff Duties Division. 1925. (p. 150-151.)
- "Chronicle of International Events". American Journal of International Law. 9 (2): 512. April 1915 – via Internet Archive.
- Cooper, John (2009). Woodrow Wilson: A Biography. New York: Vintage Books. ISBN 978-0307277909.
- Fry, Joseph (2002). Dixie Looks Abroad: The South and U.S. Foreign Relations, 1789–1973. Baton Rouge: Louisiana State University Press. ISBN 978-0-8071-2745-2.
- Larson, Erik (2015). Dead Wake: The Last Crossing of the Lusitania. London: Black Swan. ISBN 978-0552779340.
- Simpson, Colin (1973). The Lusitania. Boston: Little, Brown & Co. ISBN 978-0316791786.
- Walker, Alastair (2012). Four Thousand Lives Lost: The Inquiries of Lord Mersey into the Sinking of the Titanic, the Empress of Ireland, the Falaba and the Lusitania. Stroud: The History Press. ISBN 978-0752465715.

== Others ==
- Craig Stringer. "Falaba's sinking begins march to war". Titanic International's Voyage. (Magazine of Titanic International Society, No. 53., autumn 2005)
