= Gore–McLemore resolutions =

The Gore–McLemore resolutions were a set of United States Congressional resolutions introduced in early 1916 that warned US citizens against travel on armed merchant or passenger ships of belligerent nations in World War I. These resolutions came as the German Empire was preparing to ramp up its U-boat campaign in the spring of 1916, and in the aftermath of maritime disasters such as the sinking of the Lusitania. Though the two resolutions indicated a fracture between Congressional Democrats and President Woodrow Wilson regarding Germany's policy on submarine warfare, ultimately, most Congressional Democrats rallied behind President Wilson. The McLemore resolution in the House and the Gore resolution in the Senate were both tabled shortly after they were introduced.

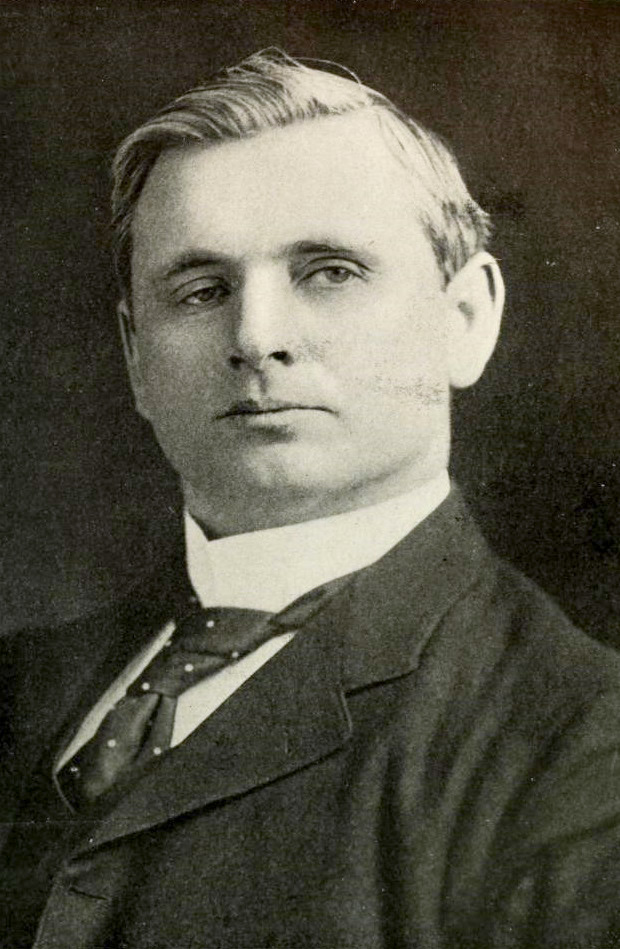
Senator Thomas P. Gore

== Text of the Gore resolution ==
Note: The following is an abridged version of the Gore resolution (S. Con. Res. 14 of the 64th Congress, dated February 25, 1916)

Therefore, be it Resolved by the Senate, the House of Representatives concurring, that it is the sense of the Congress, vested as it is with the sole power to declare war, that all persons owing allegiance to the United States should in behalf of their own safety and the vital interest of the United States forebear to exercise the right to travel as passengers upon any armed vessel of any belligerent power, whether such vessel be armed for offensive or defensive purposes; and it is the further sense of Congress that no passport should be issued or renewed by the Secretary of State, or by anyone acting under him, to be used by any person owing allegiance to the United States for purpose of travel upon any such armed vessel of a belligerent power.

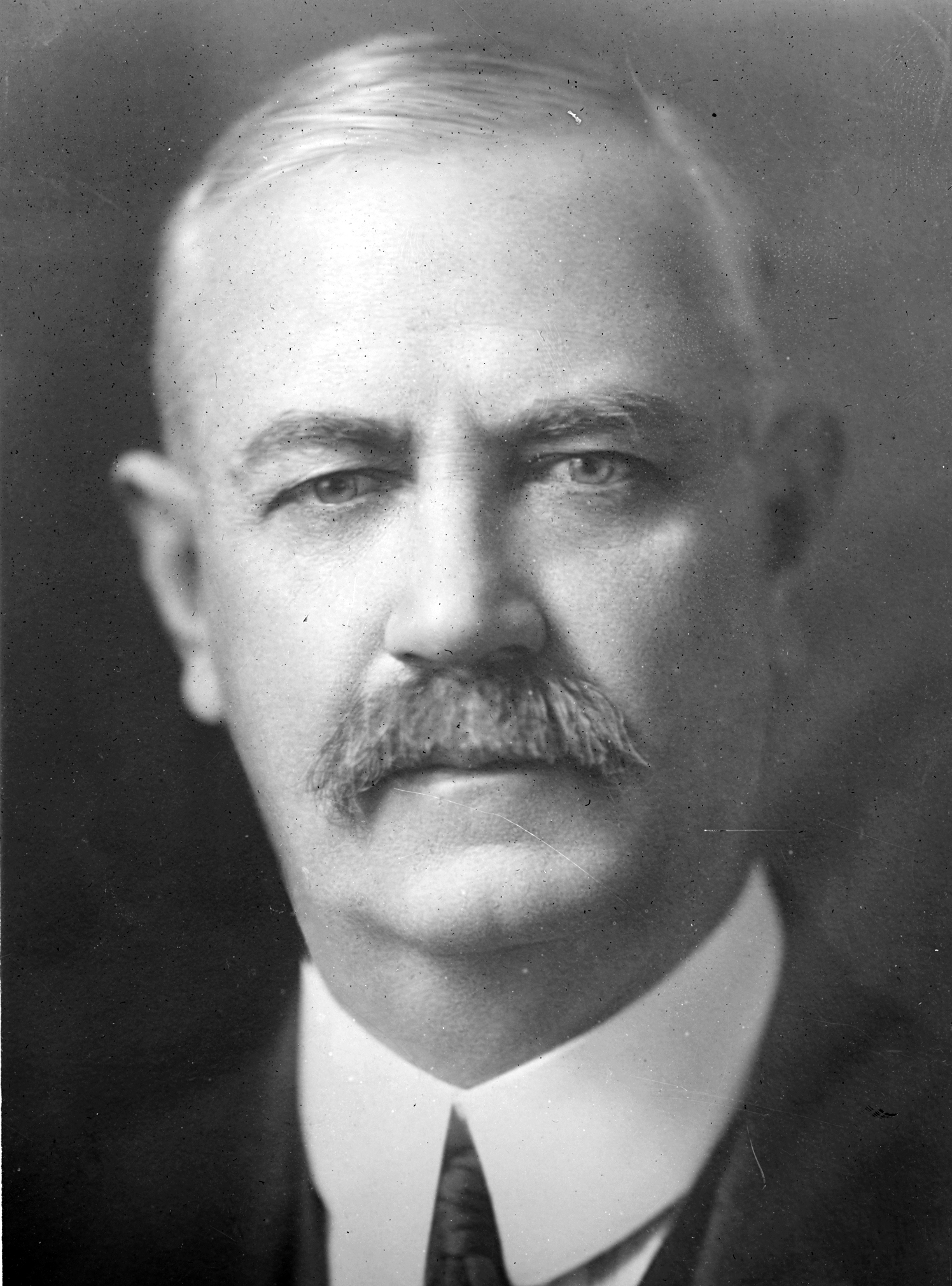
Representative A. Jefferson McLemore

== Historical background ==
Since the outbreak of World War I in mid-1914, the United States had sought to remain neutral, at least in a military sense. However, in practice, the US was more sympathetic to the Allied cause, as the US maintained economic ties to the Entente powers (particularly the United Kingdom) through loans and the munitions trade. Additionally, the upper political class feared the impact a German victory would have on the Americas.

The American diplomatic situation was further complicated when the British successfully cut Germany off from supplies via a blockade in early 1915. In response, the German Empire declared the waters surrounding the British Isles a war zone and adopted a policy of unrestricted submarine warfare that placed neutral passenger and merchant vessels in danger of U-boat attacks. Over the next few months, President Wilson, Secretary of State William Jennings Bryan, and Department of State counselor Robert Lansing made several attempts to broker a compromise between Great Britain and Germany that would alleviate the danger posed to neutral vessels, but none succeeded.

Several crises arose throughout 1915 as a result of Germany’s new submarine warfare policy, such as Falaba, Lusitania, and Arabic, all of which resulted in American casualties. Despite Wilson’s efforts for compromise and peace, by the end of 1915, it appeared that war was imminent if Americans continued to lose their lives from German U-boat attacks on Allied merchant ships. When the 64th Congress began its second session in January 1916, one of its chief concerns was addressing the submarine policy where President Wilson had apparently failed.

== Legislative journey of the Gore–McLemore resolutions ==
=== Tensions between Congress and the president in early 1916 ===
On January 5, 1916, the staunchly anti-war Senator Thomas P. Gore (D-OK) introduced two controversial bills (these were distinct from the later so-called Gore resolution) intent on regulating the travel of American citizens on ships of belligerents. While Senator Gore acknowledged that American citizens had the technical legal right to free travel aboard any passenger or merchant vessel, he believed that Americans were morally obligated to stay off of the vessels of belligerent ships in order to minimize the risk of war between the US and Germany. Like other Senators at the time, Gore was concerned that further loss of American life to German submarine attacks would force the US to sever diplomatic relations with Germany, the first step to declaring war. During the resulting debates on these issues, it became apparent that a rift between Congress and the President had begun to form.

On February 8, 1916, Germany announced that all armed merchantmen would be treated as ships of war and sunk starting by the beginning of March. In response, on February 15, Secretary of State Robert Lansing declared Germany fully responsible for any loss of American lives but also stated that "there was no present intention to warn Americans to refrain from traveling on belligerent merchantmen". The combination of the German declaration and Lansing's response that provoked a significant Congressional reaction with a flurry of bills and resolutions, among which were those of Senator Gore and Representative Atkins Jefferson McLemore of Texas.

As a result of the furor in Congress over President Wilson's handling of the submarine controversy, Senator William Stone (D-MO), chair of the Foreign Relations committee, joined by other House and Senate leaders, requested a meeting with President Wilson on February 21, 1916, to clarify these issues. At the meeting, President Wilson seemed determined to support the right of Americans to travel aboard armed merchant vessels, declaring that he would sever diplomatic relations with the Central Powers if Germany continued to sink merchant vessels to the loss of American lives and insisting that Congress stop interfering in the diplomatic controversy. These words seemed to confirm the fears of anti-war Democrats in the Senate, like Senators Gore and Stone, who believed it necessary to warn Americans off of armed merchant vessels in the aftermath of the meeting.

On February 24, 1915, President Wilson exchanged letters with Senator Stone that further reaffirmed Wilson's commitment to preserving the rights of American citizens. In this letter, which was later publicized, Wilson argued that "many other humiliations would certainly follow" if Americans were prevented from travelling freely, and that "[America] cannot yield then without conceding her own impotency as a nation." The next day, President Wilson clandestinely met with House leadership at the so-called "Sunrise Conference" and further declared that he would not accept an erosion of America's sovereign rights. President Wilson told his audience that the resolution of the German submarine controversy relied on the American people "standing behind the Executive". By this point, the mood in Congress had shifted back in favor of President Wilson, though Senator Gore remained steadfast in his anti-war views.

=== McLemore resolution in the House ===
In the aftermath of the German declaration, the sentiment in the House of Representatives clashed with that of President Wilson. Anti-war Democrats in the House took the initiative and requested that the President warn all US citizens to refrain from travel on armed merchant vessels through Representative A. Jefferson McLemore's resolution H. Res. 147, introduced on February 22, 1916. The McLemore resolution was referred to the House Foreign Affairs Committee, which discussed the resolution on February 23.

The anti-war Democrats in the House apparently miscalculated how much support the McLemore resolution would receive from Democratic party leadership; after the meeting on February 23, Representative Henry Flood (D-VA), chairman of the Foreign Affairs Committee, advised the Wilson administration that he would stall the McLemore resolution in committee. This sentiment was also later echoed by the House Speaker, Champ Clark. Furthermore, on February 25, House representatives from Georgia prepared a pro-Wilson resolution of their own to rebuff the McLemore resolution should it move out of committee. On the same day, one Representative read two newspaper editorials that called on Congress to support the President, which was apparently met with considerable applause.

By the end of February, President Wilson had consolidated support among Congressional Democrats for his diplomatic stance in Congress, and support for the McLemore resolution waned. On March 7, 1916, the House voted 276-142 to table the McLemore resolution, with House Democrats overwhelmingly supporting the motion to table by a six-to-one-margin, especially in the South.

=== Gore resolution in the Senate ===
Senator Gore's resolution, S. Con. Res. 14, was introduced on February 25, 1916, and read into the Congressional record. Gore's resolution featured slightly different language to McLemore's, as it addressed US citizens directly and included a clause directing the Secretary of State to cease issuing passports in certain cases. Gore likely knew that his resolution would not have passed Congress, as pro-Wilson Congressmen had already begun to reverse any pro-resolution momentum by the time Gore introduced S. Con. Res. 14.

So sure of victory was President Wilson that on February 29, he called for the Gore–McLemore resolutions to be put to a vote. This was, in theory, a risky maneuver as a victory for the Gore–McLemore resolutions would have been detrimental to diplomatic efforts abroad. However, President Wilson wanted to demonstrate that he had the support of Congress to foreign powers (such as Germany) who otherwise might have used the apparent disunity against the US in future diplomatic negotiations.

On March 3, 1916, the Gore resolution was put up for debate and a later vote. During these debates, Senator Gore stated that he based his actions off of a report that President Wilson had met with certain Congressional leaders and intimated to them that the US and Germany would likely soon be at war, and that the US "entering the war now might be able to bring it to a conclusion and thus render a great service to civilization." Gore was unknowingly referring to the "Sunrise Conference", and his statement was actually a fairly accurate account of the meeting, though the implication that Wilson wanted war was strenuously denied by other members of Congress.

Just before the vote on March 3, Senator Gore added new language to his resolution: "The sinking by a German submarine, without notice or warning, of an armed merchant vessel of her public enemy, would constitute a just and sufficient cause of war between the United States and the German Empire." This move reportedly unsettled other members of Congress, both supporters and opponents of the original Gore resolution, as they no longer were able to give thoughts on the amended resolution before the vote. The new language effectively inverted the resolution's meaning: a vote to table the resolution was transformed into a vote against war with Germany, which was Gore's objective in the first place as an anti-war Congressman. Ultimately, the Senate voted to table the Gore resolution 68-14, with Gore himself voting in favor of tabling his own resolution.

== Aftermath ==
Despite the submarine controversy at the beginning of 1916, by March, most Congressional Democrats had fallen in line with President Wilson, who had "cracked the whip of party discipline" ahead of the 1916 election, which Wilson narrowly won. Though there was another significant submarine attack on the Sussex in April 1916, the resulting Sussex pledge cooled tensions with Germany for the remainder of the year (when it came to submarine policy).

As World War I raged on, the rift between Senator Gore and President Wilson only increased, as Gore continued his anti-war, isolationist streak and took issue with many facets of Wilson's foreign policy, both during and after the war. Gore's positions on the selective service and League of Nations especially earned him the ire of the Oklahoman press. Gore later wrote in a letter to his grandson, Gore Vidal, that the Gore–McLemore resolution "was the first link in the chain of events that led to my defeat in [the 1920 Senate race]," but further explained that he thought that the US was "speeding headlong into war."

In April 1917, Congress voted on a resolution declaring war on Germany, which passed both houses with an overwhelming majority. Senator Gore was not present for the vote in the Senate, but later stated that he would have voted against the declaration of war to remain true to his campaign pledges. Representative McLemore voted against the declaration of war in the House.
