= Sultan Masud Mirza =

Sultan Masud Mirza may refer to:

- Sultan Mas'ud Mirza - Timurid Prince.
- Massud Mirza
