= Hamdam al-Molouk =

Daughter of Amir Kabir

- Born: 1848–1849
- Died: 1878–1879 (aged 30); Isfahan, Qajar Iran
- Burial: Imamzadeh Ahmad, Isfahan
- Spouse: Mass'oud Mirza Zell-e Soltan
- Issue: Soltan Hossein Mirza Jalal ed-Dowleh; Kokab al-Saltaneh; Shokat al-Saltaneh; Aziz al-Saltaneh
- Father: Amir Kabir
- Mother: Ezzat ed-Dowleh
- Religion: Shia Islam

Hamdam al-Molouk (Persian: همدم‌الملوک; died circa 1879) was the daughter of Amir Kabir and his second wife, Ezzat ed-Dowleh.

== Biography ==
By the decree of her uncle, Naser al-Din Shah Qajar, she married one of his sons, Mass'oud Mirza Zell-e Soltan. The couple had several children: Soltan Hossein Mirza Jalal ed-Dowleh, Kokab al-Saltaneh, Shokat al-Saltaneh, and Aziz al-Saltaneh.

Hamdam al-Molouk died at a young age in 1296 AH (circa 1879 CE). According to the inscription on her tombstone, her death occurred at the age of 31 due to an illness. She was interred in a mausoleum filled with exquisite paintings and plasterwork in the Hassanabad neighbourhood of Isfahan, near the shrine of Imamzadeh Ahmad. This serene resting place was reportedly a favoured retreat of Naser al-Din Shah.
