= Bahram Mirza Sardar Mass'oud =

Iranian prince (1885–1916)

Prince Bahram Mirza Sardar Mass'oud (Persian: بهرام‌میرزا سردارمسعود; 1885 – 24 March 1916) was an Iranian prince of the Qajar dynasty and a constitutionalist. He was a son of Mass'oud Mirza Zell-e Soltan and a grandson of Naser al-Din Shah Qajar.

He was well-educated and an advocate of the Persian Constitutional Revolution. In 1907, when Mohammad Ali Shah Qajar came to power, he emigrated with his father to Europe and for a while lived in Nice and Paris.

While returning to Iran, he was killed in a German torpedo attack on the SS Sussex, a French passenger ferry, on 24 March 1916. His death was reported in Le Figaro and Les Echos newspapers on 2 April 1916.
