= Esma'il Mass'oud =

Iranian prince (1887–1968)

Esma'il Mirza
- Mo'tamed ed-Dowleh
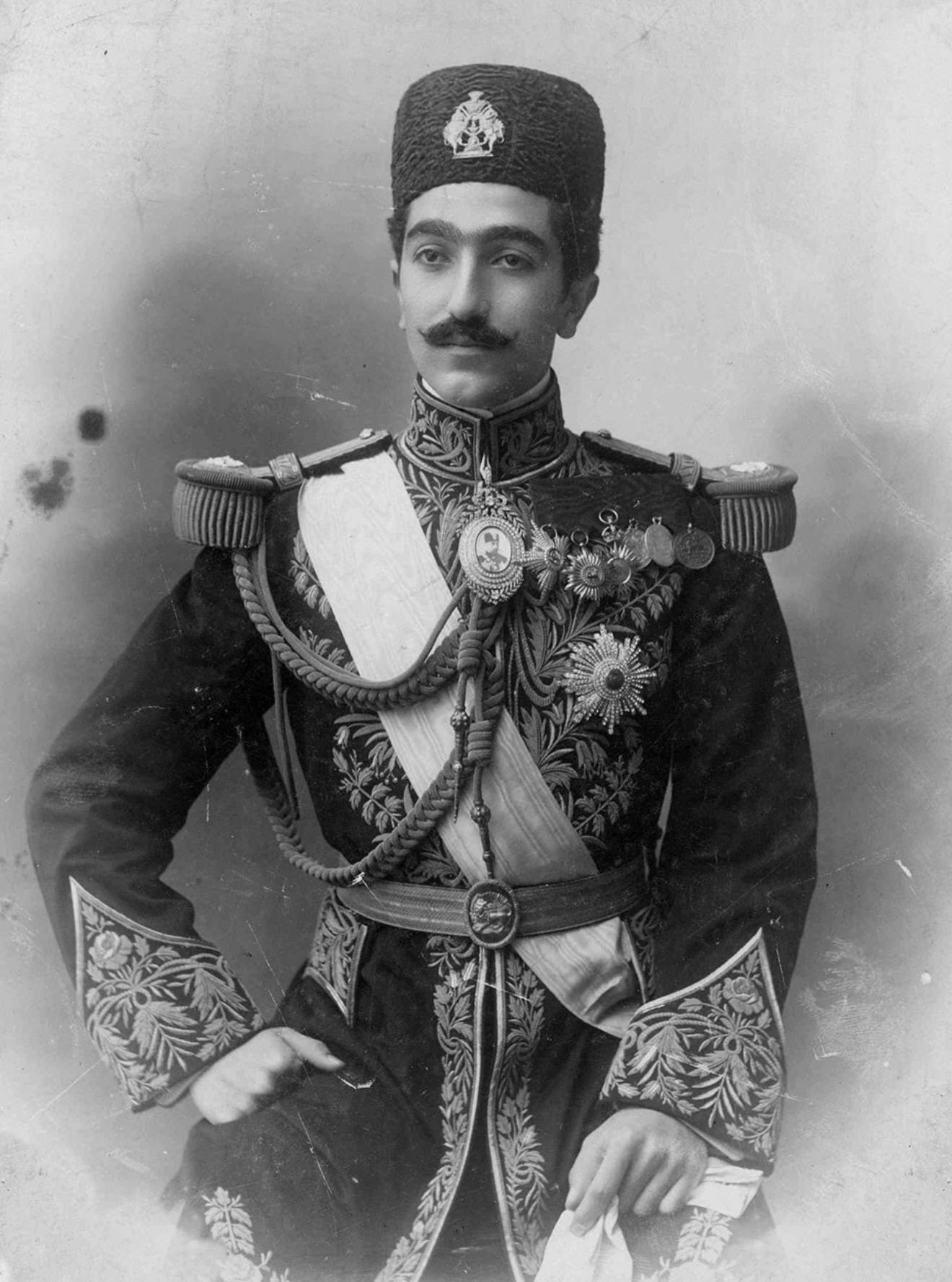
- Esma'il Mass'oud in Ceremonial uniform
- Born: 1887
- Died: 1968 (aged 80–81); Isfahan, Imperial State of Iran
- Burial: Takht-e Foulad cemetery
- Issue: Puran Dokht; Assefeh
Names
- Esma'il Mirza Mo'tamed ed-Dowleh
- Dynasty: Qajar
- Father: Mass'oud Mirza Zell-e Soltan
- Religion: Shia Islam

Esma'il Mass'oud (Persian: اسماعیل مسعود; 1887–1968), also known as Esma'il Mirza Mo'tamed ed-Dowleh (اسماعیل‌میرزا معتمدالدوله), was an Iranian prince of the Qajar dynasty, son of Mass'oud Mirza Zell-e Soltan and grandson of Naser al-Din Shah Qajar.

He was educated in École spéciale militaire de Saint-Cyr in Paris and Royal Military Academy Sandhurst in London. Esma'il Mirza was appointed by George VI a Knight Commander of Order of the Star of India and a Knight of the Order of the White Eagle in Russia by Tsar Nicholas II. He returned to Iran in 1916 and died aged 81 in 1968 in Isfahan.

He was buried in Takht-e Foulad cemetery.

== Issue ==
- Puran Dokh (1922–1993; married Mostafa Soltani, had two children: Bahram Soltani and Shala Soltani (b. 1942))
- Assefeh (1923–1993; married Morteza Soltani, had four children: Homa, Hayedeh, Bahman and Mitra Soltani)

== Honors ==
- Knight Commander of Order of the Star of India
- Grand Cross of Légion d'honneur of France
- Knight of the Order of the White Eagle of Russia
