= Akbar Mass'oud =

Iranian prince (1885–1975)

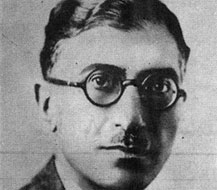
- Born: 1885
- Died: 29 November 1975 (aged 89–90); Isfahan, Imperial State of Iran
- Burial: Takht-e Foulad cemetery
- Dynasty: Qajar
- Father: Mass'oud Mirza Zell-e Soltan

Akbar Mass'oud (Persian: اکبر مسعود; 1885 – 29 November 1975), also known as Akbar Mirza Sarem od-Dowleh (اکبرمیرزا صارم‌الدوله), was an Iranian prince and a member of the Qajar dynasty. He was a son of Mass'oud Mirza Zell-e Soltan and a grandson of Naser al-Din Shah Qajar.

He was styled Mo'in os-Saltaneh before 1909. He was Minister for Works and Commerce in 1915, Foreign Affairs in 1916, Minister for Finance in 1919–1920, Governor of Isfahan in 1917, Kermanshah and Hamadan in 1920–1921, and Governor-General of Fars in 1922–1923 and 1929. Akbar Mirza died at the age of 90 on 29 November 1975 in Isfahan.

He was buried in Takht-e Foulad cemetery.
