= SS Falaba =

British passenger and cargo ship sunk in 1915

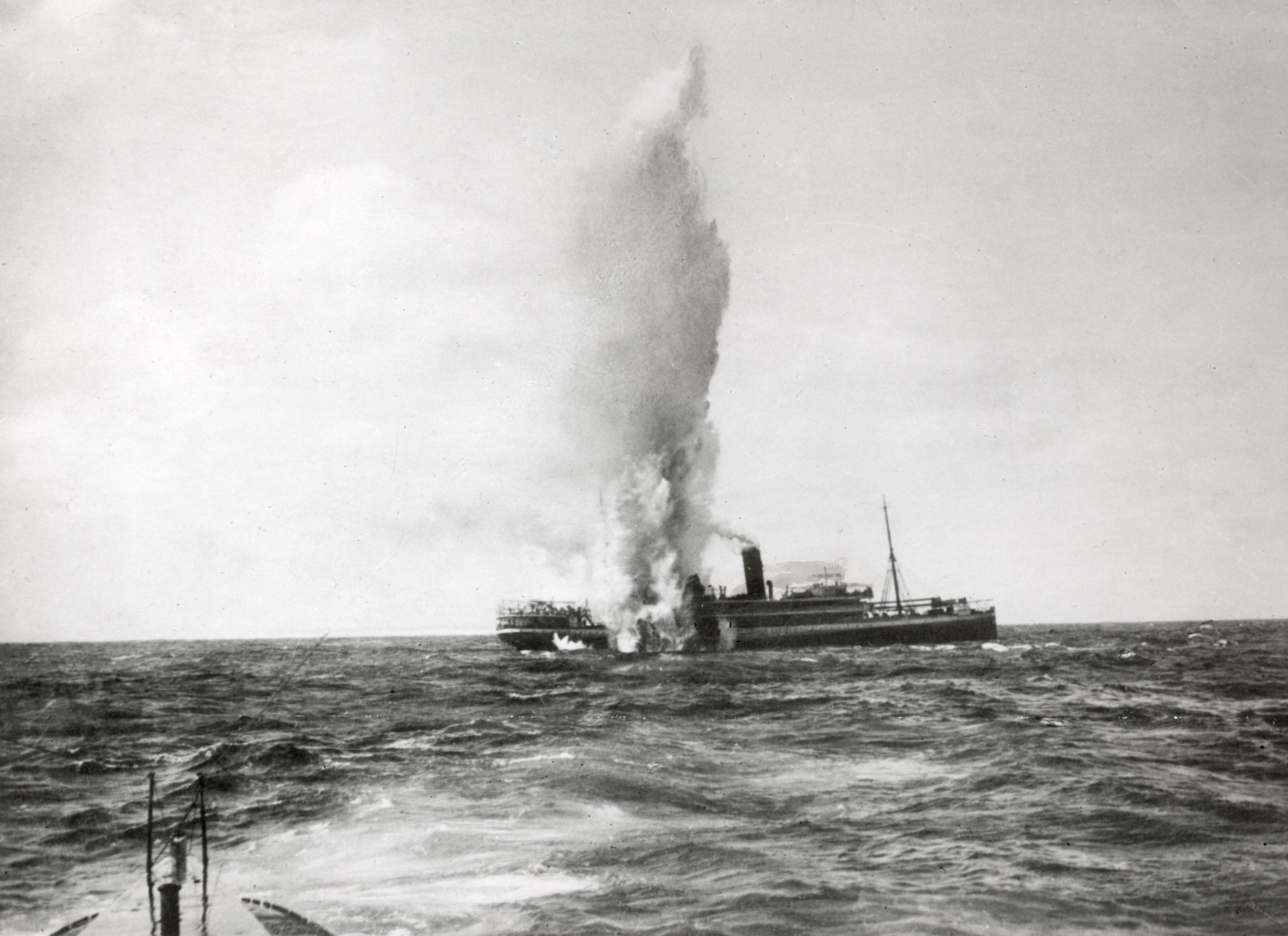
- Falaba being sunk

History

United Kingdom
- Name: Falaba
- Namesake: Falaba
- Owner: Elder, Dempster Shipping Ltd
- Operator: Sir Alfred Jones
- Port of registry: Liverpool
- Builder: A Stephen & Sons, Linthouse
- Yard number: 414
- Launched: 22 August 1906
- Completed: 1906
- Identification: UK official number 124000; code letters HJGF; by 1913: call sign MZK
- Fate: Sunk by torpedo, 1915

General characteristics
- Type: cargo liner
- Tonnage: 4,806 GRT, 3,011 NRT
- Length: 380.5 ft (116.0 m)
- Beam: 47.4 ft (14.4 m)
- Depth: 22.9 ft (7.0 m)
- Installed power: 654 NHP
- Propulsion: 1 × triple-expansion engine; 1 × screw
- Speed: 15 knots (28 km/h)
- Capacity: passengers: 138 × 1st class; 72 × 2nd class
- Crew: 96
- Notes: sister ship: Albertville

SS Falaba was a British cargo liner. She was built in Scotland in 1906 and sunk by a U-boat in the North Atlantic in 1915. The sinking killed more than 100 people, provoking outrage in both the United Kingdom and United States.

She was the first of two Elder Dempster Lines ships that were named after the town of Falaba in Sierra Leone. The second was a motor ship that was built in 1962, sold and renamed in 1978, and scrapped in 1984.

== Building and identification ==
In 1905 Elder, Dempster Shipping Ltd ordered a pair of cargo and passenger liners from Alexander Stephen and Sons of Linthouse in Glasgow. Yard number 413 was launched on 23 May as Fulani, but then bought by Compagnie Maritime Belge and completed as Albertville. Yard number 414 was launched on 22 August as Falaba, and completed for Elder, Dempster as planned.

Falaba's registered length was 380 ft (120 m), her beam was 47.4 ft (14.4 m) and her depth was 22.9 ft (7.0 m). Her tonnages were 4,806 GRT and 3,011 NRT. She had berths for 210 passengers: 138 in first class, and 72 in second class.

Elder, Dempster registered Falaba in Liverpool. Her UK official number was 124000 and her code letters were HJGF. By 1911 she was equipped for wireless telegraphy, supplied and operated by the Marconi Company. By 1913 her call sign MZK.

In 1911 Elder, Dempster bought Albertville and renamed her Elmina.

== Loss and rescue ==
On the afternoon of 27 March 1915 Falaba left Liverpool for West Africa carrying 151 passengers and 95 crew. They included 30 British Army officers on their way to prepare for the Kamerun campaign, and 70 Colonial Service officers. Her cargo included 13 tons of cartridges and gunpowder.

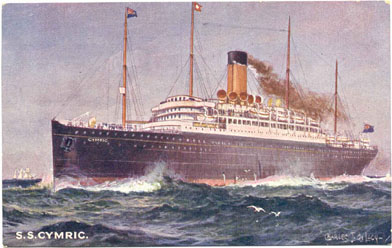
The White Star Liner Cymric

Falaba left the Mersey estuary just after the White Star Liner Cymric, and at 19:00 hrs the two ships dropped their pilots to the same cutter off Holyhead. The ships parted in the Irish Sea, as Cymric headed for Fastnet and Falaba made for Las Palmas.

The next day Falaba sighted a submarine in St George's Channel 38 nautical miles (70 km) west of the Smalls Lighthouse. The submarine was flying the White Ensign, but as it closed on her, it replaced it with the ensign of the Imperial German Navy, and signalled "Stop and abandon ship". The submarine was U-28. Falaba's Master, Captain Frederick J Davis, ordered "full ahead", which increased her speed to 15 knots (28 km/h). Falaba also fired distress rockets. U-28 gave chase at 16 knots (30 km/h) for a quarter of an hour, and ordered "Stop or I will fire". Falaba hove to, and U-28 told her "You have ten minutes".

Falaba's Chief Officer ordered the Marconi wireless operator to transmit a distress signal. It said "Submarine alongside. Am putting off passengers in boats." Cymric was one of the ships that received the signal, and was no more than 15 nautical miles (28 km) away, but Admiralty standing orders forbade her to put herself at risk by going to assist. A few minutes later, Cymric's Marconi operator heard Royal Navy warships answering Falaba's signal.

Falaba began abandoning ship. After about 10 minutes (the amount of time is disputed, with the British inquiry claiming 5 minutes, German government sources claiming 23 minutes, and many witnesses claiming 10 minutes) and before she had launched all her lifeboats, smoke was sighted on the horizon. U-28 fired one torpedo from a range of only 100 yards, hitting Falaba's engine room, and causing her to sink within ten minutes at position 51°30′N 06°36′W. The explosion also capsized the first two lifeboats that had been launched, throwing many people into the water.

One survivor said that about 50 people were standing on Falaba's poop when the torpedo struck, and he believed that all of them were killed. He said that he was with about 40 people in a lifeboat, but it was leaking badly, and within about 20 minutes it filled with water and capsized. Falaba's wireless operator described being in a lifeboat "but almost as soon as it touched the water it began to sink, a part of the side having burst through". A passenger with a piece of rope held the crack together as well as he could, but water poured in and soon we were up to our waists in water." He added that a member of the crew was washed away from the swamped lifeboat.

The British government inquiry into the sinking found that 104 people were killed, including Captain Davis. Some survivors, including the Second Engineer, alleged that about a dozen of U-28's crew were on deck, laughing at the victims, and making no effort to rescue anyone. The German government rejected such accusations as "shameless lies".

One British passenger took photographs aboard Falaba while the passengers and crew were abandoning ship. The film in his camera survived, although he was in the water for an hour before being rescued. The Daily Mirror published his photographs.

Two drifters, Eileen Emma and Wenlock, rescued survivors, and towed the lifeboats to safety. Eight people, including Captain Davis, died of hypothermia after being rescued. Survivors were landed in Milford Haven, Wales.

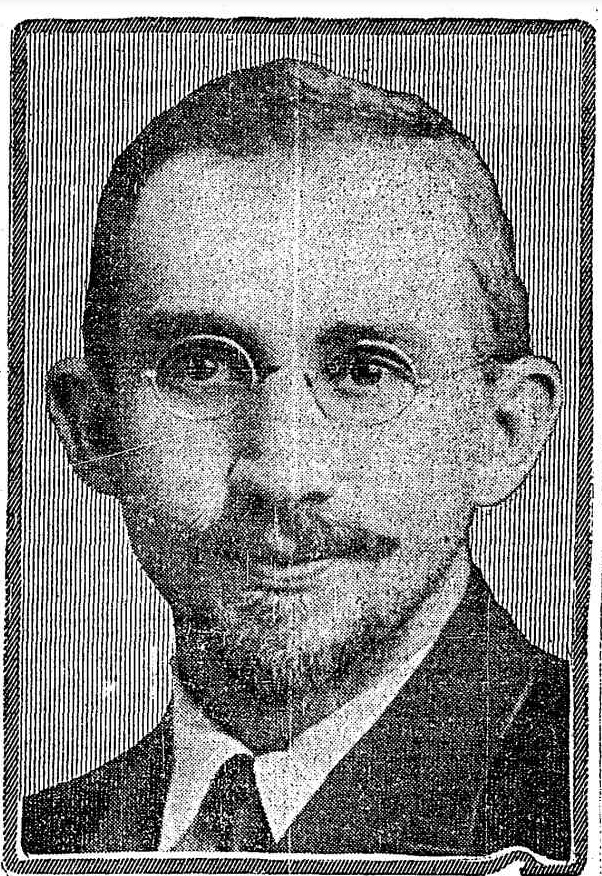
Leon Thrasher

== Increasing tensions ==
The victims included a US citizen, Leon Thrasher, from Massachusetts, who was a mechanical engineer travelling to Sekondi to work for a British mining company in Gold Coast (now Ghana). His death caused diplomatic tension between the United States and Germany that became known as the Thrasher incident, before being swept into the events surrounding the sinking of the RMS Lusitania.

Falaba was unarmed. Shipmasters and their trade union, the Mercantile Marine Service Association, responded to her loss by calling for UK merchant ships to be defensively armed. Arming merchant ships created tension with the US and other neutral nations as to whether they should be treated as warships. Germany sometimes claimed such ships could be sunk without warning. However, 149 ships were so armed by mid-May.

== German statements ==
At the end of March, Dr Bernhard Dernburg, a German former Colonial Minister who was living in the United States, said that Germany had given "ample warning" on 18 February that persons traveling on any British ship would be in danger. He called U-28's actions "perfectly justifiable", because Falaba did not heave to when ordered. A few days later, in an official message to the German Embassy in Washington, the German government also stressed that it had given due warning, and held the British government responsible for the loss of British vessels and neutral passengers.

On 6 April a German statement that was described as a "semi-official account" criticised Falaba for spending 15 minutes speeding away from U-28 instead of heaving to, and claimed that when Falaba did finally obey the order, U-28 did not fire its torpedo until after 23 minutes (contradicting eyewitnesses), and then only because of the approach of vessels, which it feared were Allied warships. The German statement reasoned that Falaba's officers and men should have used the 15 minutes of the chase to prepare her lifeboats for launching. It alleged that when they did launch her lifeboats, it was "in an unseamanlike manner", and that "They failed to give assistance, which was possible, to passengers struggling in the water."

A German communiqué drafted at the end of May 1915 complained that the UK had advised its merchant ships to disguise themselves by flying the flag of a neutral country, and to try to ram enemy submarines. U-boats were therefore entitled to torpedo merchant ships in self-defence.

== British inquiry ==
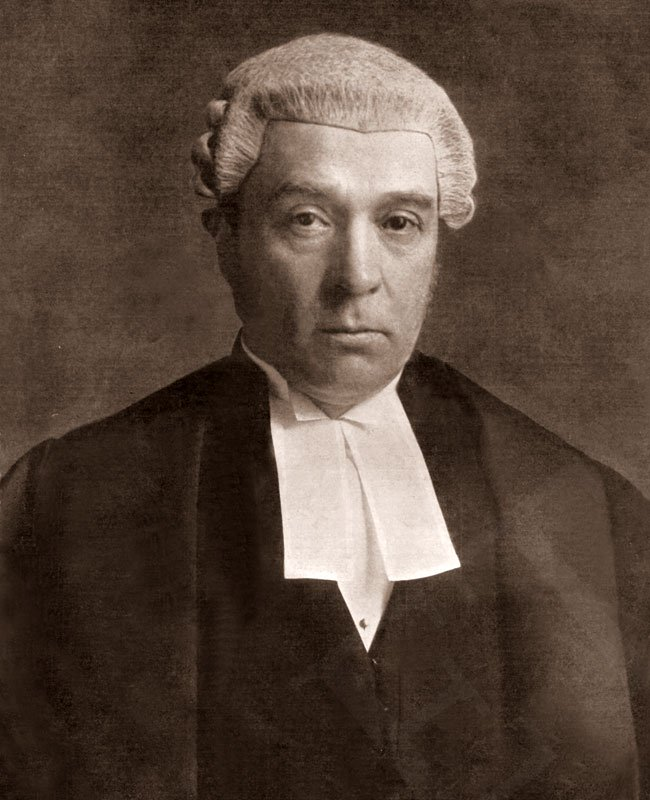
John Bigham, 1st Viscount Mersey

On 20 May 1915 an official inquiry by the Board of Marine Arbitration was opened in London. John Bigham, 1st Viscount Mersey, President of the Probate, Divorce and Admiralty Division of the High Court, presided. The Solicitor General for England and Wales, Stanley Buckmaster, represented the Board of Trade.

Some survivors told the inquiry that the lifeboats were "rotten", and that some of them were damaged when being launched. Counsel for Elder, Dempster denied that the boats were unseaworthy.

When the inquiry concluded on 8 July, Lord Mersey said he was satisfied that those witnesses were "mistaken", and the damage was not due to neglect by Falaba's officers or crew. He declared that "The cargo was an ordinary one", and he dismissed the presence of 13 tons of cartridges and gunpowder as "no more than is usually carried in peace time". He found that there were only five minutes provided for the evacuation, and so held the officers and men of U-28 "exclusively" responsible for the loss of life.

== Bibliography ==
- Bigham, John (1915). Loss of the Steamship "Falaba". Shipping Casualties. London: His Majesty's Stationery Office – via Internet Archive.
- Haws, Duncan (1990). Elder Dempster Lines. Merchant Fleets. Vol. 20. Hereford: Travel Creatours Ltd Publications. ISBN 0-946378-17-7.
- Lloyd's Register of British and Foreign Shipping. Vol. I.–Steamers. London: Lloyd's Register of Shipping. 1907 – via Internet Archive.
- Lloyd's Register of British and Foreign Shipping. Vol. I.–Steamers. London: Lloyd's Register of Shipping. 1911 – via Internet Archive.
- The Marconi Press Agency Ltd (1913). The Year Book of Wireless Telegraphy and Telephony. London: The St Katherine Press.
- Mercantile Navy List. London. 1907 – via Crew List Index Project.
- Walker, Alastair (2012). Four Thousand Lives Lost: The Inquiries of Lord Mersey into the Sinking of the Titanic, the Empress of Ireland, the Falaba and the Lusitania. Stroud: The History Press. ISBN 978-0752465715.
