= Soltan Hossein Mirza Jalal ed-Dowleh =

Qajar prince (1868–1914)

Hossein Mirza
- Soltan; Jalal ed-Dowleh
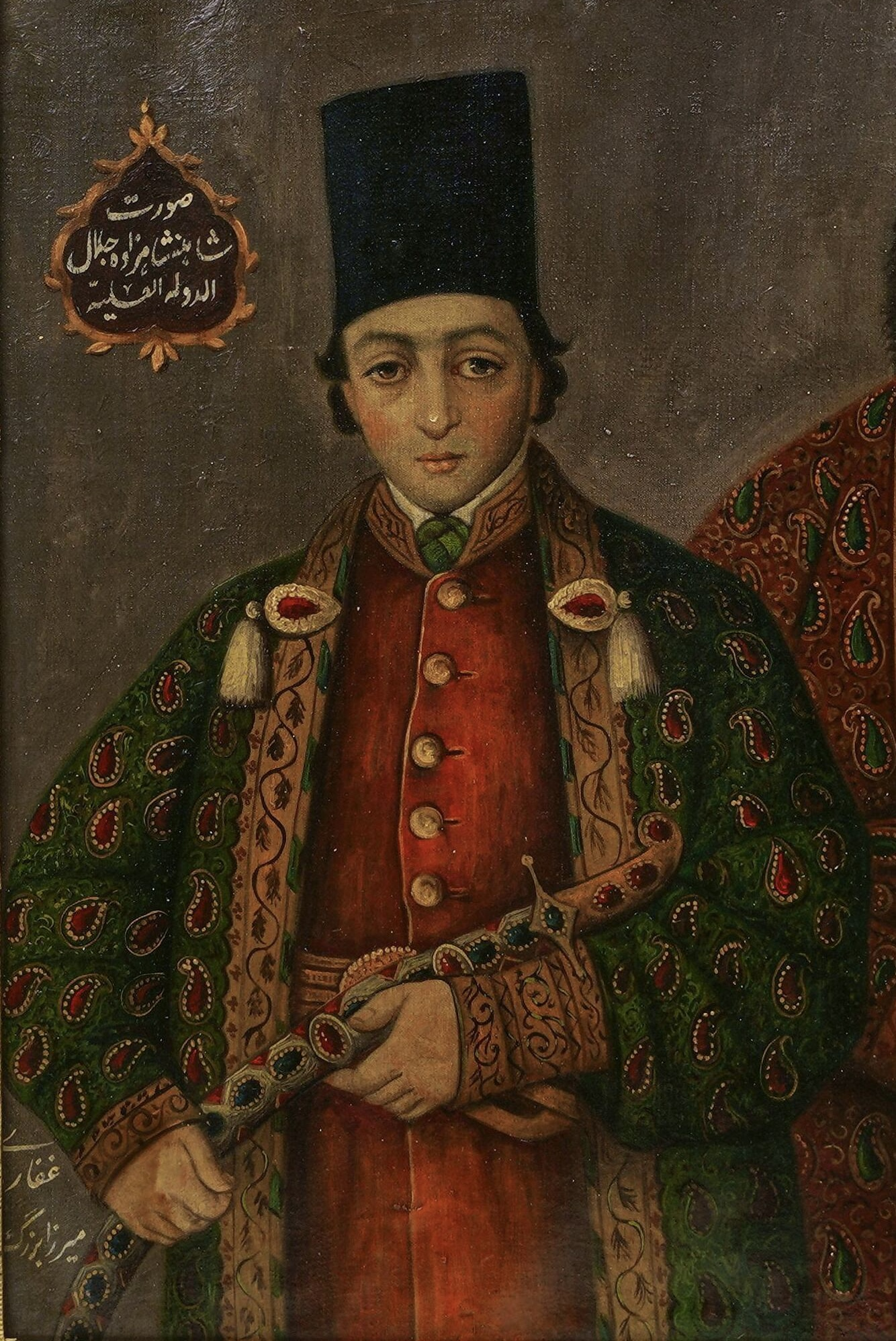
- Portrait of Jalal ed-Dowleh, Signed by Mirza Bozorg Ghaffari
- Born: 21 October 1870
- Died: 12 January 1914 (aged 43); Tehran, Qajar Iran
- Burial: Shah Abdol-Azim Shrine
- Issue: Qeisar Mirza Jalal al-Dowleh; Ali Mohammad Khan Zill al-Dowleh; Malekeh Zaman; Badr al-Zaman
- Dynasty: Qajar
- Father: Mass'oud Mirza Zell-e Soltan
- Mother: Hamdam al-Molouk
- Religion: Shia Islam

Soltan Hossein Mirza Jalal ed-Dowleh Qajar (Persian: جلال‌الدوله قاجار; 1868–1914), born Soltan Hossein Mirza, was a Qajar prince, politician, and governor. He was an opponent of Mohammad Ali Shah Qajar (r. 1907–1909) and an active figure during the Persian Constitutional Revolution.

== Biography ==
=== Early life ===
Jalal ed-Dowleh was born in 1285 AH (1868 CE). His father, Mass'oud Mirza Zell-e Soltan, was the eldest son of Naser al-Din Shah Qajar and a powerful governor of Isfahan and Fars. His mother, Hamdam al-Molouk, was the daughter of the renowned statesman Mirza Taqi Khan Amir Kabir.

=== Governorship and political career ===
In 1298 AH (1881 CE), his father, Zell-e Soltan became governor of Fars and appointed Jalal ed-Dowleh as his deputy governor. In 1303 AH (1885 CE), during his governorship in Shiraz, he faced a public uprising due to bread shortages, which he failed to resolve.

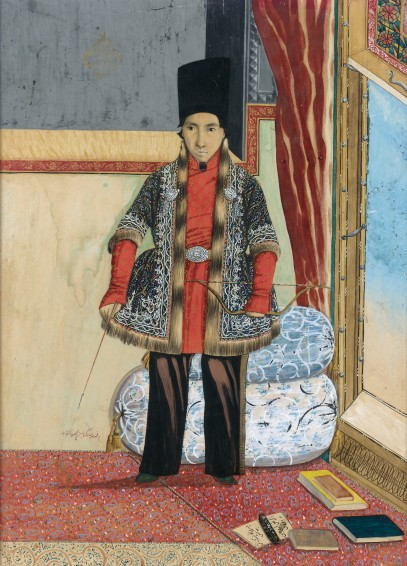
A Portrait of Soltan Hossein Mirza Jalal ed-Dowleh, at 10 years old.

Jalal ed-Dowleh’s service as deputy governor lasted seven years. He also served as governor of Yazd twice: initially from 1307 AH (1889 CE) under his father’s administration and again from 1311 to 1323 AH (1894–1905 CE). However, his governorship was marred by violent incidents, including the execution of seven individuals accused of Babi affiliation in Yazd in 1308 AH (1891 CE). His harsh methods led to complaints and his eventual removal from office in 1309 AH (1892 CE).

After briefly staying in Tehran, he resumed governorship in 1311 AH (1894 CE) and held various posts until 1323 AH (1905 CE). Later, he was appointed governor of Kurdistan and Zanjan and also achieved the military rank of Amir Nuyan, the highest military rank during the Qajar era.

=== Role in the Constitutional Revolution ===
Jalal ed-Dowleh became a vocal supporter of the Persian Constitutional Revolution (1905–1911). He joined the “Assembly of Princes,” which advocated for constitutionalism. However, British and Russian sources accused him of conspiring against Mohammad Ali Shah, seeking to dethrone him, and positioning Zell-e Soltan as regent.

In 1326 AH (1908 CE), Mohammad Ali Shah summoned him along with other Qajar princes. Despite assurances of safety, Jalal ed-Dowleh was arrested, imprisoned in Bagh-e Shah, and later exiled to Firouzkuh. Following the shelling of the Iranian Parliament (National Consultative Assembly), his house was looted, and he was exiled to Europe.

While in Paris, he joined the “Society of Iranians in Paris,” opposing Mohammad Ali Shah’s autocratic rule and advocating for freedom in Iran.

=== Later years and death ===
Jalal ed-Dowleh returned to Iran in 1328 AH (1910 CE) and accepted the governorship of Kerman in 1329 AH (1911 CE). However, little is known about his later life. He died on 12 Safar 1332 AH (January 1914) during a hunting trip, reportedly from kidney colic. He was buried in the mausoleum of Naser al-Din Shah at the Shah Abdol-Azim Shrine in Rey.

Part of his wealth, including lands in Jalaliyeh (north of old Tehran, now central Tehran), was later acquired to establish the University of Tehran.
