= SS Sussex =

Ship built in 1896

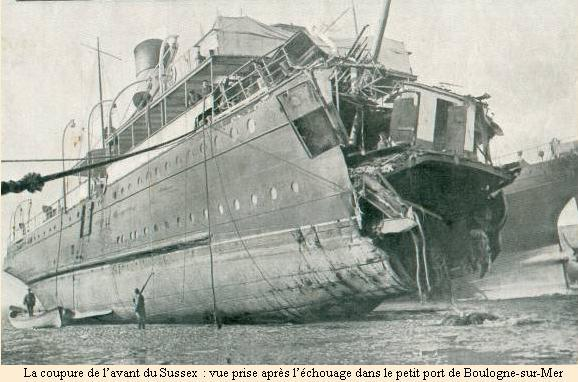
- Sussex at Boulogne after being torpedoed in March 1916. The entire forepart of the ship was destroyed in the attack.

History
- Name: Sussex (1896–1920); Aghia Sophia (1920–22)
- Owner: London, Brighton and South Coast Railway (1896–1914); Compagnie des Chemins de Fer de l'État Français (1914–1919); D Demetriades (1919–22)
- Operator: London, Brighton and South Coast Railway (1896–1917); Marine Nationale (1917–19); D Demetriades (1919–22)
- Port of registry: Newhaven (United Kingdom of Great Britain and Ireland) United Kingdom (1896–1914); Dieppe France (1914–19); Piraeus Greece (1919–22)
- Route: Newhaven – Dieppe (1896–1914); Folkestone – Dieppe (1914–16)
- Builder: William Denny & Brothers
- Cost: UK£60,016
- Yard number: 530
- Launched: 30 April 1896
- Completed: 17 July 1896
- Out of service: 1916–19
- Identification: UK Official Number 105651
- Fate: Damaged by fire 1921, then scrapped

General characteristics
- Type: Passenger ferry
- Tonnage: 1,117 GRT; 328 NRT
- Length: 275.0 ft (83.82 m)
- Beam: 34.1 ft (10.39 m)
- Draught: 9.9 ft (3.02 m)
- Depth: 14.0 ft (4.27 m)
- Installed power: Two 4-cylinder triple expansion steam engines
- Propulsion: Twin propellers
- Speed: 20.5 knots (38.0 km/h)
- Capacity: 750 passengers
- Crew: 32 crew

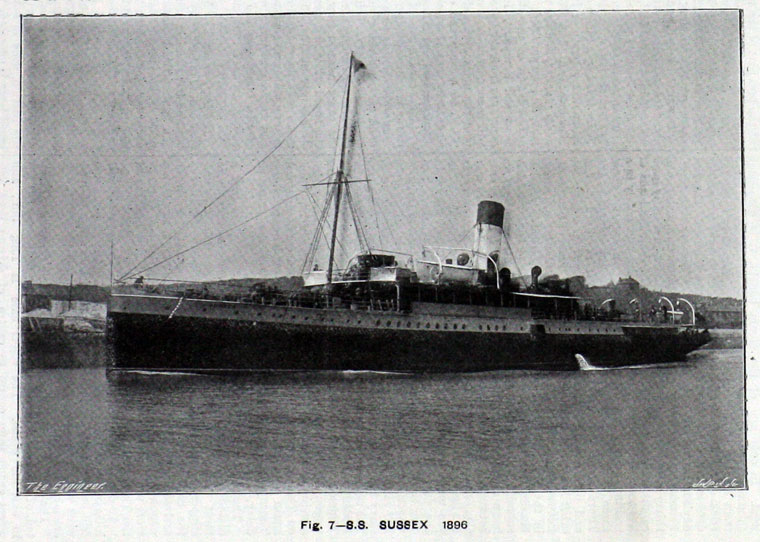
Sussex in the English Channel

SS Sussex was a cross-Channel passenger ferry, built in 1896 for the London, Brighton and South Coast Railway (LBSCR). After the LBSCR came to a co-operation agreement with the Compagnie des Chemins de Fer de l'État Français, she transferred to their fleet under a French flag. Sussex became the focus of an international incident when she was severely damaged by a torpedo from a German U-boat in 1916 and at least 50 passengers died. After the war she was repaired and sold to Greece in 1919, being renamed Aghia Sophia. Following a fire in 1921, the ship was scrapped.

== Description and construction ==
Built in 1896 by William Denny and Brothers of Dumbarton at a cost of UK£60,016 for the London, Brighton and South Coast Railway Company, with some participation of the French Compagnie des chemins de fer de l'Ouest (CF de l'Ouest) which had been operating the Newhaven-Dieppe service jointly since 1863. Sussex was an almost exact replacement of the 1893-built Seaford, which sank in 1895 after collision with another LBSCR vessel, the cargo ship Lyon; in the light of that sinking, an extra watertight bulkhead was incorporated. Sussex had a certified capacity of 750 passengers.

Sussex was 275.0 ft (83.82 m) long, with a beam of 34.1 feet (10.39 m), depth of 14.0 feet (4.27 m) and draught of 9.9 feet (3.02 m). As built, she measured 1,117 GRT and 328 NRT. She was powered by two four-cylinder triple expansion steam engines made by Denny & Co, totalling 308 nhp or 4772 ihp, to give the required service speed of 20 knots (37 km/h). Sussex was launched on 30 April 1896 by Viscountess Duncannon, whose husband was a director, and later chairman, of LBSCR. The ferry undertook builders' trials on 10 and 14 July, achieving 20.4 knots (37.8 km/h), and was delivered on 18 July.

== History ==
Sussex served on the Newhaven - Dieppe route, making her maiden voyage on 31 July 1896.

In March 1912 she came to the assistance of the stricken P&O liner Oceana, which had been in collision with the 2850-ton German-registered 4 masted steel-barque Pisagua and subsequently sank with the loss of 9 lives. Replaced by the Paris on the Newhaven - Dieppe route in 1913, she was moved to Brighton to offer long day trip excursions, in competition with the White Funnel fleet paddle steamers of Bristol-based P and A Campbell. However, this proved unlucrative, and she was laid up from the end of that season. She was then sold in 1914 to the Compagnie des Chemins de Fer de l'État Français, remaining under the management of the LBSCR.

=== World War I ===
During the First World War, shipping from Newhaven was diverted to operate from Folkestone in order to free Newhaven for supplying British troops on the Western Front.

On 24 March 1916, Sussex was on a voyage from Folkestone to Dieppe when she was torpedoed by SM UB-29. The ship was severely damaged, with the entire bow forward of the bridge blown off. Some of the lifeboats were launched, but at least two of them capsized and many passengers were drowned. Of the 53 crew and 325 passengers, at least 50 were killed, although a figure of between 80 and 100 is also suggested. Sussex remained afloat and was eventually towed stern-first into Boulogne harbour.

The dead included the celebrated Spanish composer Enrique Granados, his wife Amparo, a Persian prince, Bahram Mirza Sardar Mass'oud, and Irish tennis player Manliffe Goodbody. Vera Collum, returning to her hospital in France where she worked as a radiographer, was badly injured. Several Americans were injured, including Wilder Penfield, then a medical student at Oxford University and later an eminent neurosurgeon. His left leg was shattered by the blast, and Penfield required months of treatment and rehabilitation afterward.

Although none of the 75 US citizens aboard were killed, the incident enraged public opinion in the United States, and caused a heated diplomatic exchange between the US and German governments. In May 1916, Germany issued a declaration, the so-called Sussex pledge, which effectively represented the suspension of the "intensified" U-boat campaign.

Between 1 and 3 January 1917, HMS Duchess of Montrose, HMS Myrmidon, HMS Nepaulin, HMS Redcar, HMT Security assisted in the salvage of Sussex after she struck a mine near the West Dyck shoal on her way to Dunkirk, each ship receiving a portion of the salvage money. Sussex remained in France, and was used by the Marine Nationale at Le Havre.

=== Post-World War I ===
Sussex was repaired in France post-war, and in 1920 was sold to D Demetriades, Piraeus, being renamed Aghia Sophia. She was scrapped in 1921 following damage sustained in a fire.

== Sources ==
- Bridgeland, Tony (2002). Outrage at Sea: Naval Atrocities in the First World War. Barnsley: Pen and Sword Books. ISBN 0-85052-877-1.
