= Sussex pledge =

1916 German government pledge regarding naval warfare policy

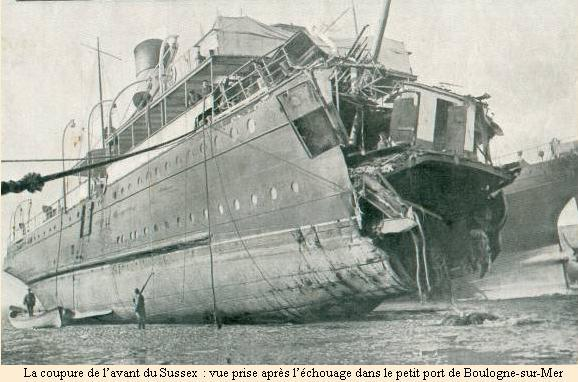
SS Sussex at Boulogne after being torpedoed in March 1916. The entire forepart of the ship was destroyed in the attack.

The Sussex Pledge was a promise made by Germany to the United States in May 1916, during World War I before the latter entered World War I. After the Arabic incident, the Germans had promised that attacks on passenger ships would cease. Despite that avowed restriction, a French cross-channel passenger ferry, the Sussex, was torpedoed without warning on March 24, 1916. The ship was severely damaged and about 80 people died, including the famous Spanish pianist and composer Enrique Granados. Several Americans were also injured, though none died.

US President Woodrow Wilson declared before Congress that the Germans were breaching their assurances once again, that past assurances "has in fact constituted no check at all upon the destruction of ships of every sort", and that if the Germans sought to argue that submarines could not be used except by means "incompatible with the principles of humanity", and used them nevertheless, the United States would break diplomatic relations with Germany.

Fearing American entry into the war, Germany tried to appease the United States by issuing on May 4, 1916 the Sussex pledge, which promised a change in Germany's naval warfare policy. These were the primary elements of the pledge:

- Passenger ships would not be targeted.
- Merchant ships would not be sunk until the presence of weapons had been established, if necessary by a search of the ship
- Merchant ships would not be sunk without provision for the safety of passengers and crew.

In 1917, Germany became convinced that it could defeat the Allied Forces by instituting unrestricted submarine warfare before the United States could enter the war. The Sussex pledge was, therefore, rescinded in January 1917, which started the decisive stage of the so-called First Battle of the Atlantic. The resumption of unrestricted submarine warfare and the Zimmermann Telegram caused the United States to declare war on Germany on April 6, 1917.
