= Mass'oud Mirza Zell-e Soltan =

Iranian prince (1850–1918)

Mass'oud Mirza
- Zell-e Soltan
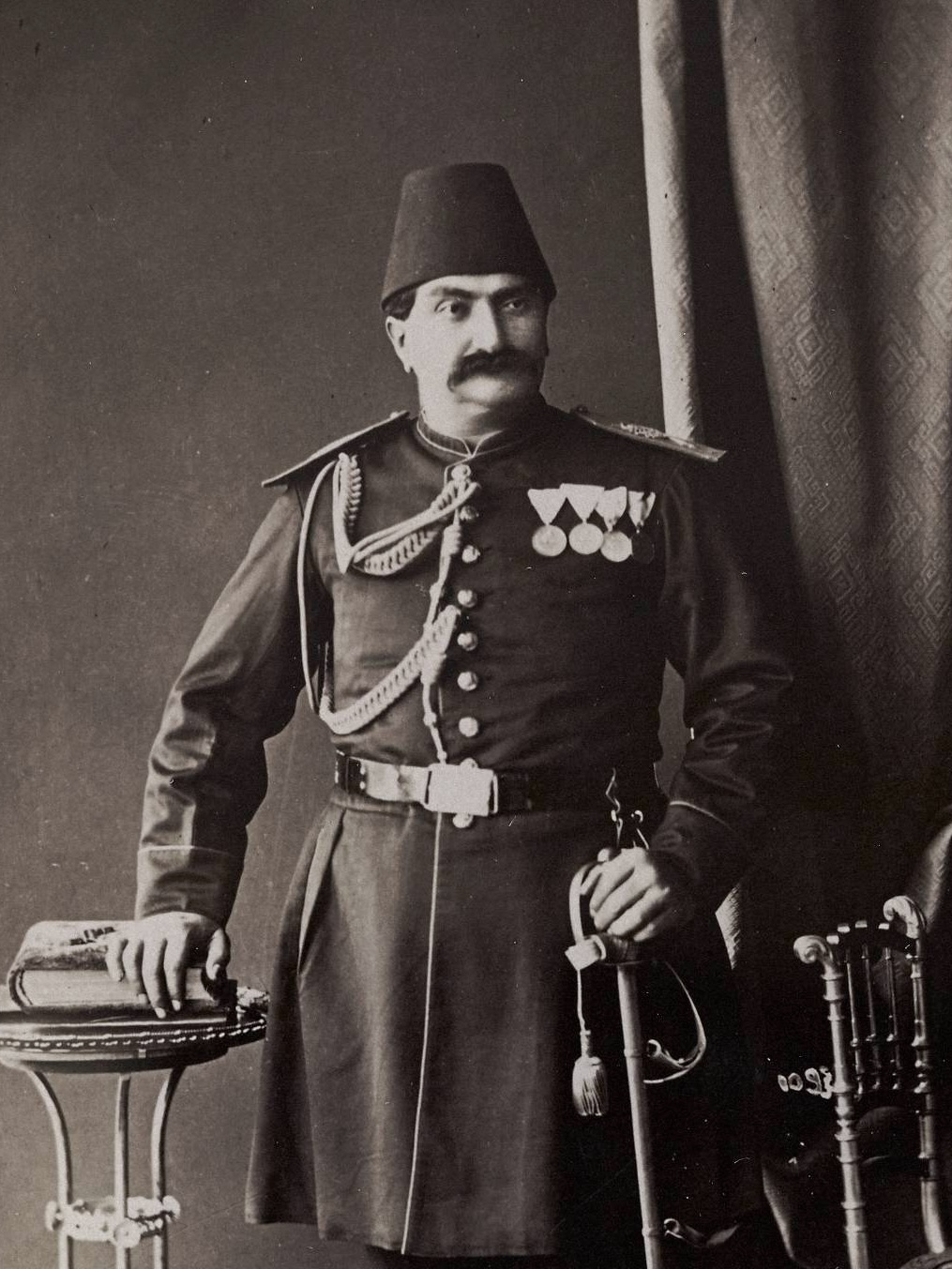
- Zell-e Soltan by Antoin Sevruguin

Governor of Isfahan
- Tenure: 1872–1907
- Born: 5 January 1850; Tabriz, Iran
- Died: 2 July 1918 (aged 68); Isfahan, Iran
- Burial: Mashhad
- Spouse: Hamdam al-Molouk
- Issue: Prince Soltan Hossein Mirza Jalal ed-Dowleh; Prince Bahram Mirza Sardar Mass'oud; Prince Akbar Mirza Sarem ed-Dowleh; Prince Esma'il Mirza Mo'tamed Dowleh
- Dynasty: Qajar
- Father: Naser al-Din Shah Qajar
- Mother: Efet-od-Dowleh

Mass'oud Mirza Zell-e Soltan (Persian: مسعود میرزا ظل‌السلطان, lit. 'Mass'oud Mirza the Sultan's Shadow'; 5 January 1850 in Tabriz – 2 July 1918 in Isfahan), or Massud Mirza, was an Iranian prince of the Qajar dynasty; he was known as the "Yamin-od-Dowleh" ("Right Hand of the Government"). He was posted as the governor of Isfahan for over 35 years, and the governor of Mazandaran, Fars, and Isfahan for a total of 40 years.

== Early life ==
He was the eldest son of Naser al-Din Shah and Effat-od-Dowleh, and the brother of Kamran Mirza Nayeb es-Saltaneh and of Mozaffar ad-Din Mirza (who eventually became Mozaffar ad-Din Shah), but Mas'oud Mirza could not ascend the throne because his mother was not a member of the Qajar dynasty. At the age of 13 he was appointed the governor of Mazandaran, Turkmen Sahra, Semnan, and Damghan for 4 years.

== Later life ==
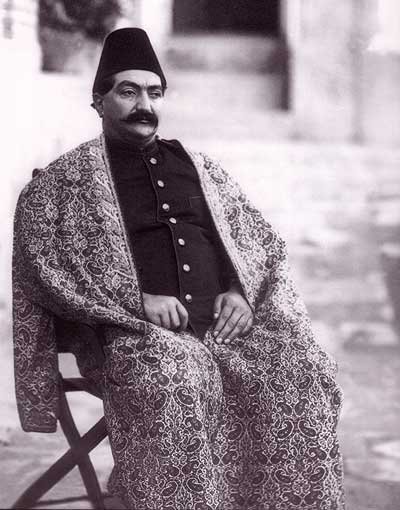
Massud Mirza in 1890, photographed by Ernst Hoeltzer

He was governor of Isfahan from 1872 to 1907 and governor of Fars from 1907 to 1908. Mass'oud Mirza died in Isfahan in 1918. He was buried in Mashhad. He had 14 sons and 11 daughters.

== Issue ==
Zell-e Soltan had 14 sons and 11 daughters including :

- Prince Homayoun Mirza Mass’oud Amir Arfae
- Prince Soltan Hossein Mirza Jalal ed-Dowleh
- Prince Pirouz Mirza Mass'oud
- Prince Bahram Mirza Sardar Mass'oud (1885 – 24 March 1916)
- Prince Akbar Mirza Sarem ed-Dowleh (1885 – 29 September 1975)
- Prince Esma'il Mirza Mo'tamed Dowleh (1887–1968)

== Honours ==
- 2nd class of Order of the Lion and the Sun of Iran
- 1st class of Order of the Lion and the Sun of Iran
- 2nd class of Neshan-e Aqdas of Iran
- Knight of the Order of the Star of India
- Knight of the Order of the Black Eagle of Prussia
- Knight of the Order of the Red Eagle of Prussia
- Knight of the Order of the White Eagle of Russia
- Grand Cross of the Legion d'Honneur of France
- Exalted Order of Honour of Turkey

== Bibliography ==
- Walcher, Heidi (2008). In the Shadow of the King: Zill al-Sultan and Isfahan under the Qajars. London: I.B.Tauris. ISBN 978-1-85043-434-4
- Soltani, Shahla (2006). Aqajan Shazdeh. Tehran: Farzan Rooz. ISBN 964-321-255-6
