= SS Cymric =

White Star Line steamship

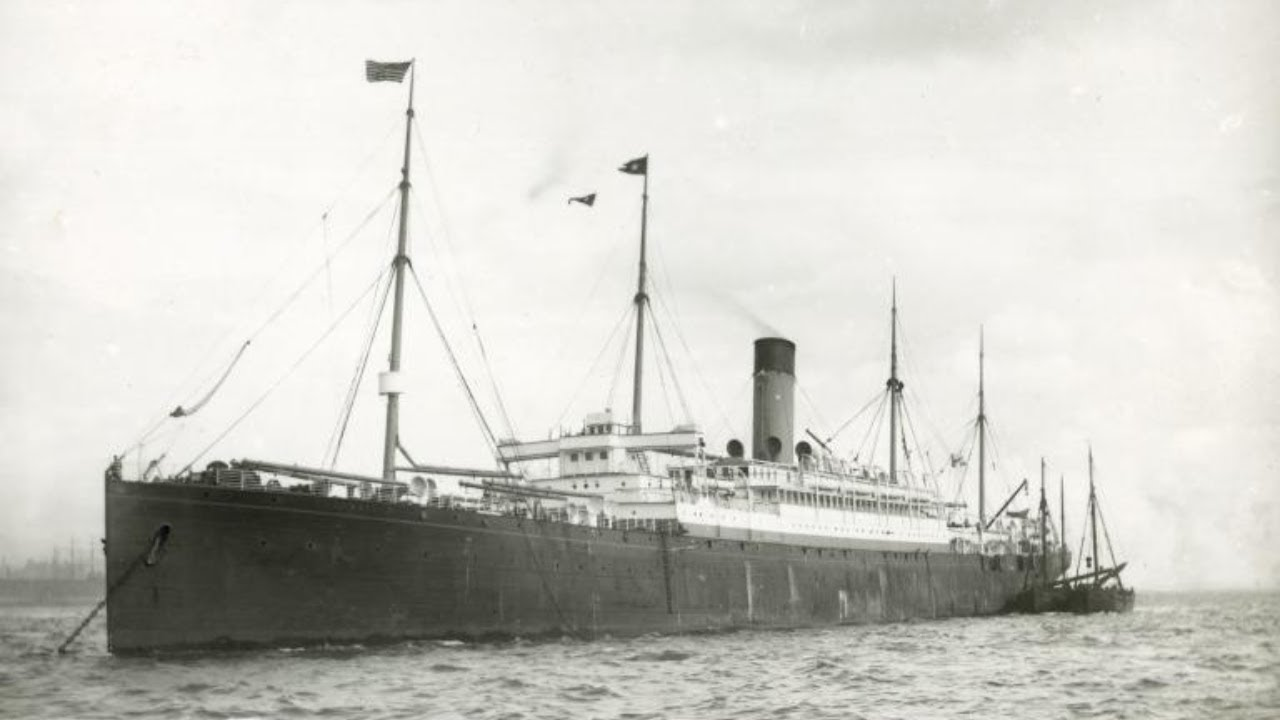
- SS Cymric

History

United Kingdom
- Name: Cymric
- Owner: White Star Line
- Builder: Harland & Wolff, Belfast
- Yard number: 316
- Launched: 12 October 1897
- Completed: 5 February 1898
- Maiden voyage: 11 February 1898
- Fate: Torpedoed and sunk on 9 May 1916

General characteristics
- Tonnage: 12,552 GRT, 8,123 NRT
- Length: 585 ft 5 in (178.44 m)
- Beam: 64 ft 3 in (19.58 m)
- Speed: 15 knots (28 km/h; 17 mph)
- Capacity: 1,418 passengers; 258 1st class passengers; 1,160 3rd class passengers

SS Cymric was a steamship of the White Star Line built by Harland & Wolff in Belfast and launched on 12 October 1897.

== History ==
=== Design ===
Cymric had originally been intended to be an enlarged version of SS Georgic, being a combination of a passenger liner and livestock carrier, with accommodation for only First Class passengers. During the stages of her design layout, it became clearer to the designers at Harland & Wolff that combining passengers and livestock had become rather unpopular, so the spaces designated for cattle were reconfigured into Third Class accommodations. Cymric retained her relatively small and lower-powered machinery, intended to drive the ship at the slower, more economical speeds of a cargo-liner. When her livestock spaces were removed in favour of more passenger accommodation, the high internal volume provided by the former cargo space and the relatively small machinery space (as opposed to the more speed-orientated passenger liners of the time, which dedicated a large proportion of their hull space to boilers and engines) produced a ship that was relatively slow for a passenger liner but with much more interior space and an uncommonly high degree of comfort. The less powerful machinery produced less noise and vibration for passengers and had much lower running costs at Cymric's intended service speed of 15 knots (28 km/h; 17 mph) than White Star's flagship Atlantic liner, the 20-knot (37 km/h; 23 mph) Majestic. Although Cymric's design came about somewhat by chance, she proved a popular and profitable ship and marked the beginning of White Star's shift towards an emphasis on luxurious, high-quality and comfortable accommodation over outright speed on its liners which would mark it out in contrast to its rivals during the early 20th century.

Upon final completion, she was designed to carry 1,418 passengers; 258 in First Class and 1,160 in Third Class. Her First Class accommodations consisted of an array of three-berth cabins, both open and enclosed promenade decks, a smoke room and library, and a spacious and elegant dining room capped with a large dome. Her Third Class accommodations, as was the rule on all White Star ships, were strictly segregated at opposite ends of the ship, with quarters for single men forward, and single women, married couples and families with children aft. Forward, men were provided open-berth accommodation which was less crowded than seen on other vessels, while aft passengers were provided with a smoke room and general room. As was practiced aboard Teutonic and Majestic, and later Oceanic, a limited number of two-berth and four-berth cabins were strictly reserved for married couples and families with children, while single women were berthed in dormitory-style cabins for up to 20 people.

Cymric was the first White Star ship to be fitted with quadruple expansion engines, of which she had two, producing 6,800 indicated horsepower (5,100 kW), powering two propellers.

=== Service history ===
She departed Liverpool on her maiden voyage on 11 February 1898. She quickly proved to be very popular on the North Atlantic, particularly with immigrants. She spent the first five years of her career on the White Star Line's main passenger service route between Liverpool and New York, until 1903 when she was transferred to White Star's newly acquired Liverpool–Boston route, which she sailed on for the rest of her peacetime career alongside a series of running mates; firstly Canada, later replaced by Republic, until she was lost in 1909, Cymric was then joined by Zeeland until 1911, and then Arabic as her running mate. In 1913, her accommodation was downgraded, from then on she carried only second and third class passengers. In all, her career with White Star spanned approximately 18 years, during which time she carried 155,522 passengers. That figure breaks down to 111,161 passengers westbound; with 31,387 on the New York service and 79,774 on the Boston service, and additional 44,361 passengers eastbound between the two service routes.

=== War service ===
During both the Boer War and the First World War she was pressed into service as a troop and cargo transport. In 1914, Cymric transported British soldiers to France.

In August 1915 Cymric delivered 17,000 tons of ammunition from New York to Liverpool, one of the biggest shipment of such kind from the United States since the start of the war. She continued to shuttle between the Atlantic coast of the United States and Great Britain carrying cargo and passengers until her last voyage in April 1916.

On 29 April 1916, Cymric finished her loading in New York and sailed for Liverpool with 112 people on board including five or six passengers (sources vary). On 8 May 1916, she was torpedoed three times 140 miles (230 km) west-north-west off Fastnet Rock, Ireland by Walther Schwieger's U-20, which had sunk RMS Lusitania a year earlier. A torpedo explosion in the port side of her engine room instantly killed four crew members. Cymric sank the next day. Altogether five people died as one sailor fell into the sea during evacuation and drowned. Since all who died were British citizens, there were no international repercussions. While the general location of her sinking is known, Cymric's wreck has not been located.

Between 1914 and 1918 about 50 large oceangoing passenger steamships converted to war purposes as floating hospitals and troop transports were sunk in the Atlantic by German forces. Cymric came to be the thirty-seventh in the list.
