= 1924 in Iran =

- Decades
- See also: Other events of 1924; Years in Iran

The following lists events that happened during 1924 in Qajar era.

== Incumbents ==
- Monarch: Ahmad Shah Qajar
- Prime Minister: Reza Shah

== Events ==
- Sheikh Khazal rebellion.

== Births ==
- January 6 – Ali Abdo (football chairman), Founder of Persepolis Athletic and Cultural Club.
- January 9 – Mohsen Koochebaghi Tabrizi, Iranian grand ayatollah.
- January 11 – Shahrokh Meskoob, Iranian writer, translator and historian.
- February 14 – Khalil Tahmasebi, Iranian assassin.
- February 21 – Mostafa Oskooyi, Iranian theatre director.
- February 23 – Parviz Shapour, Iranian writer.
- February 26 – Delkash, Iranian musician.
- March 15 – Hossein Fekri, Iranian footballer.
- March 18 – Hamid Mammadzadeh, Azerbaijani writer.
- March 21 – Khalil Oghab, Iranian wrestler.
- March 22 – Marzieh (singer), Iranian singer.
- March 29 – Paul M. Naghdi, Iranian-American professor of mechanical engineering.
- May 26 – Mohsen Vaziri-Moghaddam, Iranian - Italian painter.
- May 29 – Behjat Sadr, Iranian painter.
- June 11 – Adib Boroumand, Poet, politician, attorney.
- June 21 – Ezzatolah Entezami, Iranian actor.
- August 23 – Mohammad Jafar Mahjoub, Iranian writer and scholar.
- August 25 – Mohammad-Ali Eslami Nodooshan, Iranian former jurisprudent and judge, academic, author and essayist.
- September 6 – Ali Baghbanbashi, Olympic athlete.
- September 21 – Fereydoon Hoveyda, Iranian writer and diplomat.
- October 1 – Abdul Reza Pahlavi, Iranian royal.
- October 8 – Rasoul Raeisi, Iranian weightlifter.
- October 9 – Navvab Safavi, Iranian cleric.
- October 9 – Qasem-Ali Zahirnejad, Iranian general.
- November 1 – Morteza Ahmadi, Iranian actor.
- November 27 – Abolfazl Solbi, Persian basketball player.
- December 9 – Majid Rahnema, Iranian diplomat.
- December 14 – Shahmirza Moradi, Iranian musician.
- December 20 – Hamideh Kheirabadi, Iranian actress.
- December 22 – Nosrat Karimi, Iranian actor.
- ? – Ali Shariatmadari, Iranian academic.
- ? – Hassan Saadian, Iranian amateur wrestler.
- ? – Javad Shahrestani, Persian politician.
- ? – Karamatollah Malek-Hosseini, Iranian Ayatollah.
- ? – Meir Ezri, Israeli diplomat, politician and writer.
- ? – Mir Ebrahim Seyyed Hatami, Iranian ayatollah.
- ? – Mohammad Javad Pishvai, Iranian cleric.
- ? – Mohammad Taghi Barkhordar, Iranian Industrialist.
- ? – Monir Shahroudy Farmanfarmaian, Contemporary Iranian artist, mosaic work.
- ? – Mostafa Kamal Pourtorab, Iranian composer.

== Deaths ==
- July 27 – Mohtaram Eskandari, Iranian journalist.
- ? – Ali Khan Zahir od-Dowleh, Iranian politician.
- ? – Nazem al-Atebba, Iranian physician and essayist.
- ? – Muhammad bin Fadlallah al-Sarawi, Iranian Islamic scholar and poet.
