= 1832 in Iran =

- Decades
- See also: Other events of 1832; Years in Iran

The following lists events that happened during 1832 in Qajar era.

== Incumbents ==
- Monarch: Fath-Ali Shah Qajar

== Births ==
- April 1 – Hossein-Qoli Nezam al-Saltaneh Mafi, Iranian politician.
- ? – Muhammad Hasan Ashtiyani.

== Deaths ==
- ? – Agha Baji Javanshir, poet.
