= 1829 in Iran =

- Decades
- See also: Other events of 1829; Years in Iran

The following lists events that happened during 1829 in Qajar era.

== Incumbents ==
- Monarch: Fath-Ali Shah Qajar

== Events ==
- January 30 – Massacre at the Russian Embassy in Tehran.

== Births ==
- April 1 – Mohammad-Ali Ala ol-Saltaneh, Iranian politician.
- ? – Mirza Mohammad Reza Kalhor, Iranian calligrapher.

== Deaths ==
- ? – Molla Ahmad Naraqi, Iranian writer, poet and religious servant.
