= 1931 in Iran =

- Decades
- See also: Other events of 1931; Years in Iran

The following lists events that happened during 1931 in Pahlavi Iran.

== Incumbents ==
- Shah: Reza Shah
- Prime Minister: Mehdi Qoli Hedayat

== Events ==
- Jafar Sultan revolt.

== Births ==
- February 3 – Mohammed Emami-Kashani, Iranian cleric.
- February 9 – Tofigh Jahanbakht, Iranian wrestler.
- February 24 – Rizali Khajavi, Iranian farmer respected as a folk hero.
- March 1 – Bahman Mohasses, Iranian artist.
- March 2 – Amir Hossein Rabii, Iranian general.
- March 14 – Jack Mahfar, Iranian businessperson.
- March 16 – Mashallah Amin Sorour, Iranian cyclist.
- March 17 – Fereydoun Ala, Peerage person ID=94449.
- March 22 – Farhang Sharif, Iranian musician.
- April 5 – Ebrahim Yazdi, Iranian politician and activist.
- April 8 – Mohammad-Reza Mahdavi Kani, Iranian Ayatollah.
- April 13 – Emam-Ali Habibi, Iranian wrestler.
- May 1 – Jamshid Giunashvili, Georgian scientist.
- May 1 – Petros Palian, Iranian Armenian cinematographer.
- May 6 – Hamid Samandarian, Iranian film director.
- June 22 – Mohammad Ali Khojastehpour, Iranian wrestler.
- July 2 – Mohammad Yazdi, Iranian cleric.
- September 25 – Manouchehr Atashi, Iranian writer.
- October 30 – Rafat Hashempour, Iranian voice actress.
- November 5 – Turan Bahrami Shahriari, Iranian poet.
- November 12 – Abbas Sheibani, Iranian physician and politician.
- November 26 – Mohammad Baqer Shirazi, Iranian grand ayatollah.
- December 5 – Ghasem Amiryavari, Iranian boxer.
- December 11 – Heydar Raqabi, Iranian poet.
- December 12 – Ali-Akbar Sa'idi Sirjani, Iranian murder victim.
- December 25 – Ahmad Mahmoud, Iranian novelist.
- December 31 – Amir Banoo Karimi, Iranian academic.
- ? – Abbas Hosseini Kashani, Iranian Twelver Shi'a Marja.
- ? – Abdolali Dastgheib, Iranian author.
- ? – Aramesh Dustdar, Iranian writer and philosopher.
- ? – Ayat Mohaqeqi, Iranian military commander.
- ? – Fereydoon Batmanghelidj, Iranian writer.
- ? – Hossein Nouri (wrestler, born 1931), Iranian wrestler.
- ? – Hossein Sarshar, Iranian singer and opera singer.
- ? – Jalal Sattari, Iranian writer.
- ? – Jazeh Tabatabai, Iranian artist.
- ? – Mir Shamsuddin Adib-Soltani, Iranian philosopher and translator.
- ? – Mohammad Fazel Lankarani, Iranian grand ayatollah.
- ? – Mohammad-Ali Movahedi Kermani, Iranian Ayatollah.
- ? – Mohammad-Reza Tavassoli, Iranian ayatollah.

== Deaths ==
- February 11 – Amanollah Khan Zia' os-Soltan, Iranian aristocrat and politician.
- November 19 – Hovhannes Masehyan, Iranian politician, writer and translator.
- December 15 – Shmuel Hayyim, Iranian journalist.
