= 1830 in Iran =

- Decades
- See also: Other events of 1830; Years in Iran

The following lists events that happened during 1830 in Qajar era.

== Incumbents ==
- Monarch: Fath-Ali Shah Qajar

== Births ==
- ? – Nariman Khan Qavam al-Saltaneh, Iranian politician and diplomat.
