= 1850 in Iran =

- Decades
- See also: Other events of 1850; Years in Iran

The following lists events that happened during 1850 in Qajar era.

== Incumbents ==
- Monarch: Naser al-Din Shah Qajar

== Events ==
- Golden Belt.

== Births ==
- January 5 – Mass'oud Mirza Zell-e Soltan, Persian prince and the eldest son of Naser al-Din Shah Qajar.
- November 18 – Majd ed-Dowleh Qajar-Qovanlu Amirsoleimani, Persian prince and politician.
- ? – Abdollah Mirza Qajar, Iranian photographer.
- ? – Dakhil Maraghai, Iranian poet.
- ? – Fethullah Qa'ravi Isfahani, Iranian cleric.
- ? – Jamshid Bahman Jamshidian, Iranian politician and banker.
- ? – Mirza Hossein-Qoli, Iranian musician.

== Deaths ==
- July 9 – Báb, founder of Bábism and, according to the Baháʼís, predecessor of Baháʼu'lláh.
