= 1899 in Iran =

- Decades
- See also: Other events of 1899; Years in Iran

The following lists events that happened during 1899 in Qajar era.

== Incumbents ==
- Monarch: Mozaffar ad-Din Shah Qajar

== Births ==
- March 20 – Mohammad-Reza Golpaygani, Iranian Grand Ayatollah.
- August 7 – Ali-Asghar Naghdi, Iranian politician.
- November 20 – Mohammad Hassan Mirza, Qajar prince.
- November 29 – Abol Hassan Ebtehaj, Iranian politician.
- ? – Abdolhossein Hazhir, Iranian prime minister.
- ? – Abdollah Hedayat, Persian politician.
- ? – Elgin Groseclose, American economist.
- ? – Hashim Larijani, Iranian Grand Ayatollah.
- ? – Mahmoud Baharmast, Persian military officer.
- ? – Mohammad Reza Tabasi, Iranian writer.
- ? – Morteza Mahjubi, Iranian pianist and composer.
- ? – Muhammad Taha al-Huwayzi, Iranian-Iraqi Islamic scholar and poet.
- ? – Qadam Kheyr, Iranian politician.

== Deaths ==
- ? – Anoushiravan Mirza, Qajar prince.
- ? – Emam Gholi Khan Haji Ilkhani, great ilkhan.
- ? – Hasan-Ali Khan Amir Nezam Garrusi, Iranian diplomat, politician, calligrapher and writer.
