= 1825 in Iran =

- Decades
- See also: Other events of 1825; Years in Iran

The following lists events that happened during 1825 in Qajar era.

== Incumbents ==
- Monarch: Fath-Ali Shah Qajar

== Births ==
- ? – Emam Gholi Khan Haji Ilkhani, great ilkhan.
