= 1895 in Iran =

- Decades
- See also: Other events of 1895; Years in Iran

The following lists events that happened during 1895 in Qajar era.

== Incumbents ==
- Monarch: Naser al-Din Shah Qajar

== Births ==
- September 6 – Mohammad Hadi al-Milani, Iraqi Grand Ayatollah.
- September 11 – Nur Ali Elahi, spiritual thinker, musician, writer, philosopher and jurist.
- November 12 – Nima Yooshij, Iranian poet.
- December 16 – Arpiar Aslanian, Armenian lawyer and resistance fighter.
- ? – Abbas Massoudi, Iranian journalist.
- ? – Abdol Hossein Sardari, Persian statesman and diplomat who saved the lives of many Jews during the Holocaust.
- ? – Abdollah Entezam, Iranian diplomat.
- ? – Ali Mansur, Prime Minister of Iran.
- ? – Amanullah Jahanbani, Iranian general.
- ? – Badr al-Molouk, Queen consort of Persia.
- ? – Hasan Arfa, Persian military officer and diplomat.
- ? – Hossein Gol-e-Golab, Iranian scientist and musician.
- ? – Hossein Lankarani, Iranian Shia cleric and politician.
- ? – Hossein Shahshahani, Iranian judge.
- ? – Jafar Kavian, Politician, major general, Minister of the People's Troops of the National Government of Azerbaijan..
- ? – Mohammad Ali Araki, Iranian Twelver Shi'a Marja.
- ? – Mohtaram Eskandari, Iranian journalist.
- ? – Vartan Hovanessian, Iranian-Armenian architect.

== Deaths ==
- ? – Yousuf Khan Mostashar al-Dowleh, Iranian diplomat.
