= 1978 in Iran =

- Decades: 1950s; 1960s; 1970s; 1980s; 1990s
- See also: Other events of 1978; Years in Iran

Events from the year 1978 in Iran.

== Incumbents ==
- Shah: Mohammad Reza Pahlavi
- Prime Minister:
  - until August 27: Jamshid Amouzegar
  - August 27-November 6: Jafar Sharif-Emami
  - starting November 6: Gholam-Reza Azhari

== Events ==
- 7 January – Iran and Red and Black Colonization
- 9 January – 1978 Qom protest
- 18 February – 1978 Tabriz protests
- 21 June – 1978 Iranian Chinook shootdown
- 8 September – Black Friday, massacre by Iranian army provoked 88 deaths.
- 16 September – The 7.4 M_{w} Tabas earthquake affected central Iran with a maximum Mercalli intensity of IX (Violent). At least 15,000 people were killed.

== Births ==
- 21 March – Alireza Faghani, Iranian-Australian FIFA football referee
- 23 July – Mehdi Kiani, footballer
- 23 July – Ruhollah Zam, activist and journalist (d. 2020)
- 6 May – Afshin, singer

== See also ==
- Years in Iraq
- Years in Afghanistan
