= 1824 in Iran =

- Decades
- See also: Other events of 1824; Years in Iran

The following lists events that happened during 1824 in Qajar era.

== Incumbents ==
- Monarch: Fath-Ali Shah Qajar

== Births ==
- ? – Emam Gholi Khan Haji Ilkhani, great ilkhan.
