= 1835 in Iran =

- Decades
- See also: Other events of 1835; Years in Iran

The following lists events that happened during 1835 in Qajar era.

== Incumbents ==
- Monarch: Mohammad Shah Qajar

== Births ==
- ? – Mirza Hasan Ali Nasir ol-Molk, Qajar politician.
