= 1836 in Iran =

- Decades
- See also: Other events of 1836; Years in Iran

The following lists events that happened during 1836 in Qajar era.

== Incumbents ==
- Monarch: Mohammad Shah Qajar

== Births ==
- ? – Hajj Sayyah, Iranian activist and tourist.
- ? – Nariman Khan Qavam al-Saltaneh, Iranian politician and diplomat.
- ? – Shokouh al-Saltaneh, Iranian Qajar princess.
