= 1930 in Iran =

- Decades
- See also: Other events of 1930; Years in Iran

The following lists events that have happened in 1930 in Iran.

== Incumbents ==
- Shah: Reza Shah
- Prime Minister: Mehdi Qoli Hedayat

== Events ==
- May 7 – The 7.1 M_{w} Salmas earthquake shakes northwestern Iran and southeastern Turkey with a maximum Mercalli intensity of IX (Violent). Up to 3000 people were killed.

== Births ==
- 4 July – Iraj Lalezari, scientist (died 2019)
- Unknown – Arsalan Pouria, poet (died 1994)

== Deaths ==
- 21 February – Ahmad Shah Qajar, last king of Qajar dynasty died in Neuilly-sur-Seine, France.
