= 1854 in Iran =

- Decades
- See also: Other events of 1854; Years in Iran

The following lists events that happened during 1854 in Qajar era.

== Incumbents ==
- Monarch: Naser al-Din Shah Qajar

== Births ==
- ? – Mirza Hossein-Qoli, Iranian musician.

== Deaths ==
- May 4 – Qaani, Iranian poet.
