= 1827 in Iran =

- Decades
- See also: Other events of 1827; Years in Iran

The following lists events that happened during 1827 in Qajar era.

== Incumbents ==
- Monarch: Fath-Ali Shah Qajar

== Births ==
- ? – Jalal al-Din Mirza Qajar, Iranian historian.
