= 1851 in Iran =

- Decades
- See also: Other events of 1851; Years in Iran

The following lists events that happened during 1851 in Qajar era.

== Incumbents ==
- Monarch: Naser al-Din Shah Qajar

== Births ==
- July 5 – Haji-Mirza Hassan Roshdieh, Iranian cleric and educator.
- ? – Antoin Sevruguin, Iranian photographer.
