= 1981 in Iran =

- Decades: 1960s; 1970s; 1980s; 1990s; 2000s
- See also: Other events of 1981; Years in Iran

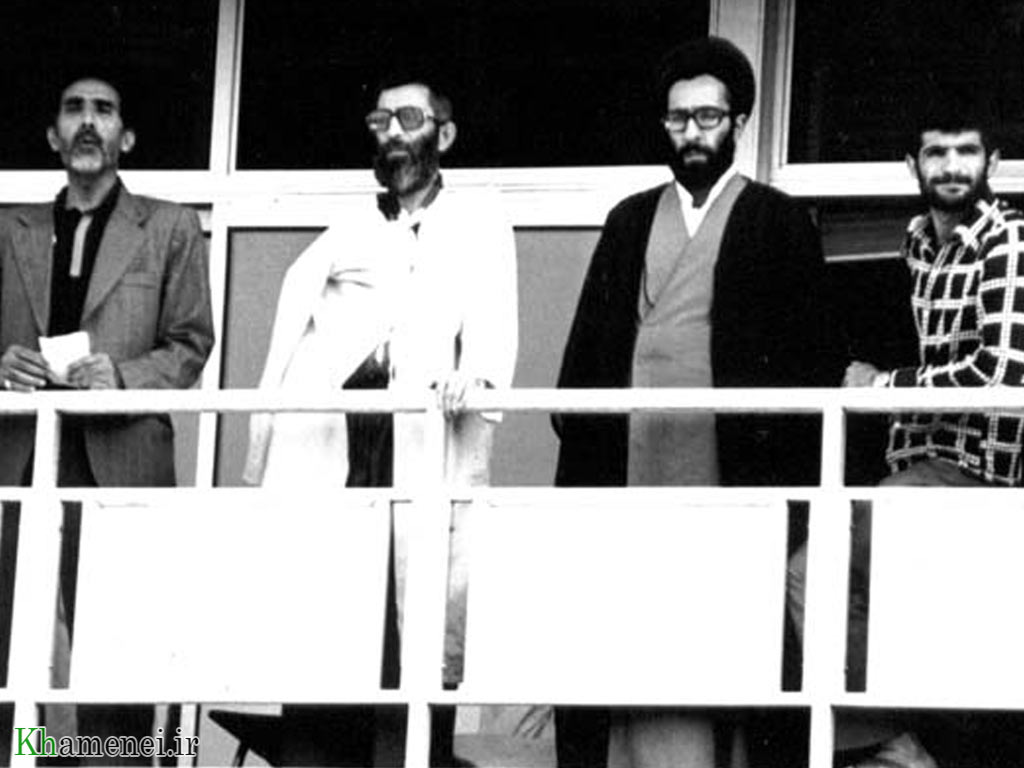
Ayatollah Ali Khamenei after assassination attempt

The following lists events that happened during 1981 in Iran.

== Incumbents ==
- Supreme Leader: Ruhollah Khomeini
- President:
  - until June 22: Abolhassan Banisadr
  - June 22–August 2: Provisional Presidential Council
  - August 2–August 30: Mohammad-Ali Rajai
  - August 30–October 13: Provisional Presidential Council
  - starting October 13: Ali Khamenei
- Prime Minister:
  - until August 4: Mohammad-Ali Rajai
  - August 4–August 30: Mohammad-Javad Bahonar
  - September 2–October 13: Mohammad-Reza Mahdavi Kani
  - starting October 13: Mir-Hossein Mousavi
- Chief Justice: Mohammad Beheshti (until June 28), Abdul-Karim Mousavi Ardebili (starting June 28)

== Events ==
=== January ===
- January 5 – For the first time since Iraq had invaded its territory in September, Iran launched a counterattack, concentrating its armies at Sousangerd. After 18 months, Iraqi forces had been driven out of Iran, which then began a drive toward capturing Iraqi territory. The war would continue until 1988.
- January 11 – Iran dropped a demand that the United States deposit 24 billion dollars in gold into an Algerian bank as a condition of the release of 52 U.S. Embassy workers being held hostage in Tehran, settling instead for the release of the nearly 8 billion dollars of Iranian assets that had been frozen in American banks.
- January 20 – On Jimmy Carter's last day as 39th President of the United States, he had hoped that the 52 American hostages in Iran would be allowed to leave before his term expired at noon. At 6:18 am Washington time, the escrow papers were completed to transfer $7,970,000,000 in Iranian assets from U.S. banks to the Bank of England. At 8:04 am EST, the Algerian intermediaries notified both the U.S. and Iran that the transfer was complete. The Boeing 727 carrying the hostages, Air Algérie Flight 133, was boarded at 8:20 pm Tehran time (11:50 am EST), but did not depart until 35 minutes later, after Ronald Reagan was sworn into office as the 40th U.S. President. The plane left Iranian airspace an hour, landing in Athens for refueling, then arriving at Algiers at 2:10 am local time the next day, where the former hostages were transferred to two Medevac planes and flown to Wiesbaden Army Airfield in West Germany.
- January 25 – The fifty-two Americans, who had been held hostage at the U.S. Embassy in Iran, returned to United States soil at 2:54 pm, as the plane carrying them landed at Stewart Air National Guard Base in New York. The group, who had been freed five days earlier, had flown from West Germany and were greeted by a crowd of 300,000 well-wishers. "

=== June ===
- June 11 – The 6.6 M_{w} Golbaf earthquake affected the Kerman province with a maximum Mercalli intensity of VIII+ (Severe), killing 1,400–3,000, and injuring many.
- June 20 – In Tehran, demonstrations by the People's Mujahedin of Iran (PMOI) against the dismissal of President Banisadr became violent, and a wave of arrests and executions of PMOI members followed. According to some accounts, the Ayatollah Khomeini ordered the Islamic Revolutionary Guards to fire into the crowd and more than 100 demonstrators were killed. In another account, the PMOI battled with the Guards, with 15 dead on each side. In the first three weeks after the demonstration, 195 of Banisadr's supporters had been tried and executed.
- June 28 – The Hafte Tir bombing: A bomb exploded in the Islamic Republican Party (IRP) headquarters building during a meeting of almost the entire leadership. Over seventy were killed, including Chief Justice Mohammad Beheshti (the second most powerful man in Iran at the time, after Ruhollah Khomeini), several cabinet members, and 27 members of the Majles (Islamic Consultative Assembly or parliament.) Numerous additional attacks on the leadership followed. Ali Khamenei, later to become the second Supreme Leader of Iran, had been wounded by a bomb concealed in a tape recorder on June 27. Mohammad-Ali Rajai was assassinated on August 30.

By year's end, the government had announced a total of 1,656 executions before a firing squad.

=== October ===
- October 2 – Iranian presidential election, October 1981

== See also ==
- Years in Iraq
- Years in Afghanistan
- List of years in Syria
