= 1994 in Iran =

- Decades: 1970s; 1980s; 1990s; 2000s; 2010s
- See also: Other events of 1994; Years in Iran

Events from the year 1994 in Iran.

== Incumbents ==
- Supreme Leader: Ali Khamenei
- President: Akbar Hashemi Rafsanjani
- Vice President: Hassan Habibi
- Chief Justice: Mohammad Yazdii

== Events ==
=== August ===
- August 3 - Qazvin protests

== Births ==
- 15 October – Hossein Vafaei, snooker player

== Deaths ==
- 19 January – Haik Hovsepian Mehr, bishop
- 4 June – Arsalan Pouria, poet

== See also ==
- Years in Iraq
- Years in Afghanistan
