= 1875 in Iran =

- Decades
- See also: Other events of 1875; Years in Iran

The following lists events that happened during 1875 in Qajar era.

== Incumbents ==
- Monarch: Naser al-Din Shah Qajar

== Births ==
- March 23 – Hossein Borujerdi, Iranian Grand Ayatollah.
- October 5 – Mostowfi ol-Mamalek, Iranian politician.
- December 25 – Freydoun Malkom, fencer.
- ? – Abbas Qomi, Iranian Shia cleric.
- ? – Hossein Hang Afarin, Iranian musician.
- ? – Hossein Pirnia, Iranian politician.
- ? – Malekeh Jahan, prince.
- ? – Mohammad Ali Shah Abadi, Iranian religious scholar.
- ? – Rahim Arbab, Iranian Great Grand Ayatollah that never wore Turban.
- ? – Soleiman Eskandari, Iranian Qajar prince, historian and socialist politician.

== Deaths ==
- ? – Emamqoli Mirza Emad od-Dowleh, Persian Qajar prince and governor.
- ? – Khosrow Mirza, Qajar prince.
