= 1985 in Iran =

- Decades: 1960s; 1970s; 1980s; 1990s; 2000s
- See also: Other events of 1985; Years in Iran

Events from the year 1985 in Iran.

== Incumbents ==
- Supreme Leader: Ruhollah Khomeini
- President: Ali Khamenei
- Prime Minister: Mir-Hossein Mousavi
- Chief Justice: Abdul-Karim Mousavi Ardebili

== Events ==
=== Ongoing ===
- Iran–Iraq War (1980–1988)

== Births ==
- 20 April – Ehsan Jami, Dutch-Iranian activist and politician
- 1 May – Saeed Kamali Dehghan.
- 19 May – Hamed Haddadi.

== See also ==
- Years in Iraq
- Years in Afghanistan
