= 1990 in Iran =

- Decades: 1970s; 1980s; 1990s; 2000s; 2010s
- See also: Other events of 1990; Years in Iran

Events from the year 1990 in Iran.

== Incumbents ==
- Supreme Leader: Ali Khamenei
- President: Akbar Hashemi Rafsanjani
- Vice President: Hassan Habibi
- Chief Justice: Mahmoud Hashemi Shahroudi

== Events ==
- 21 June – The 7.4 M_{w} Manjil–Rudbar earthquake affects northern Iran with a maximum Mercalli intensity of X (Extreme), killing 35,000–50,000, and injuring 60,000–105,000.

== Births ==
- 22 April – Arsalan Kazemi.
- 12 November – Farahnaz Amirsoleymani, author and illustrator
- 23 November – Negin Dadkhah, Iranian national speed skater

== Deaths ==
- 15 March – Farzad Bazoft.

== See also ==
- Years in Iraq
- Years in Afghanistan
