= 1870 in Iran =

- Decades
- See also: Other events of 1870; Years in Iran

The following lists events that happened during 1870 in Qajar era.

== Incumbents ==
- Monarch: Naser al-Din Shah Qajar

== Births ==
- October 12 – Mirza Jahangir Khan, Iranian writer.
- ? – Ashraf Gilani, Iranian literary, poet, journalist and cleric.
- ? – Hassan Modarres, Prime Minister of Iran.

== Deaths ==
- December 9 – Alexander Kasimovich Kazembek, Russian orientalist, historian and philologist.
