= 1801 in Iran =

- Decades
- See also: Other events of 1801; Years in Iran

The following lists events that happened during 1801 in Qajar era.

== Incumbents ==
- Monarch: Fath-Ali Shah Qajar

== Births ==
- ? – Anoushirvan Khan Eyn ol-Molk, Iranian courtier.

== Deaths ==
- April 14 – Hajji Ebrahim Shirazi, Iranian politician.
- ? – Dakhil Maraghai, Iranian poet.
