= 1982 in Iran =

- Decades: 1960s; 1970s; 1980s; 1990s; 2000s
- See also: Other events of 1982; Years in Iran

Events from the year 1982 in Iran.

== Incumbents ==
- Supreme Leader: Ruhollah Khomeini
- President: Ali Khamenei
- Prime Minister: Mir-Hossein Mousavi
- Chief Justice: Abdul-Karim Mousavi Ardebili

== Events ==
- Iranian diplomats kidnapping – Three Iranian diplomats and one Iranian photographer disappeared in Lebanon during the invasion of Lebanon.

== See also ==
- Years in Iraq
- Years in Afghanistan
