= 1984 in Iran =

- Decades: 1960s; 1970s; 1980s; 1990s; 2000s
- See also: Other events of 1984; Years in Iran

Events from the year 1984 in Iran.

== Incumbents ==
- Supreme Leader: Ruhollah Khomeini
- President: Ali Khamenei
- Prime Minister: Mir-Hossein Mousavi
- Chief Justice: Abdul-Karim Mousavi Ardebili

== Events ==
=== Ongoing ===
- Iran–Iraq War (1980–1988)

== Births ==
- 11 August – Morteza Pashaei

== See also ==
- Years in Iraq
- Years in Afghanistan
