= 1988 in Iran =

- Decades: 1960s; 1970s; 1980s; 1990s; 2000s
- See also: Other events of 1988; Years in Iran

Events from the year 1988 in Iran.

== Incumbents ==
- Supreme Leader: Ruhollah Khomeini
- President: Ali Khamenei
- Prime Minister: Mir-Hossein Mousavi
- Chief Justice: Abdul-Karim Mousavi Ardebili

== Events ==
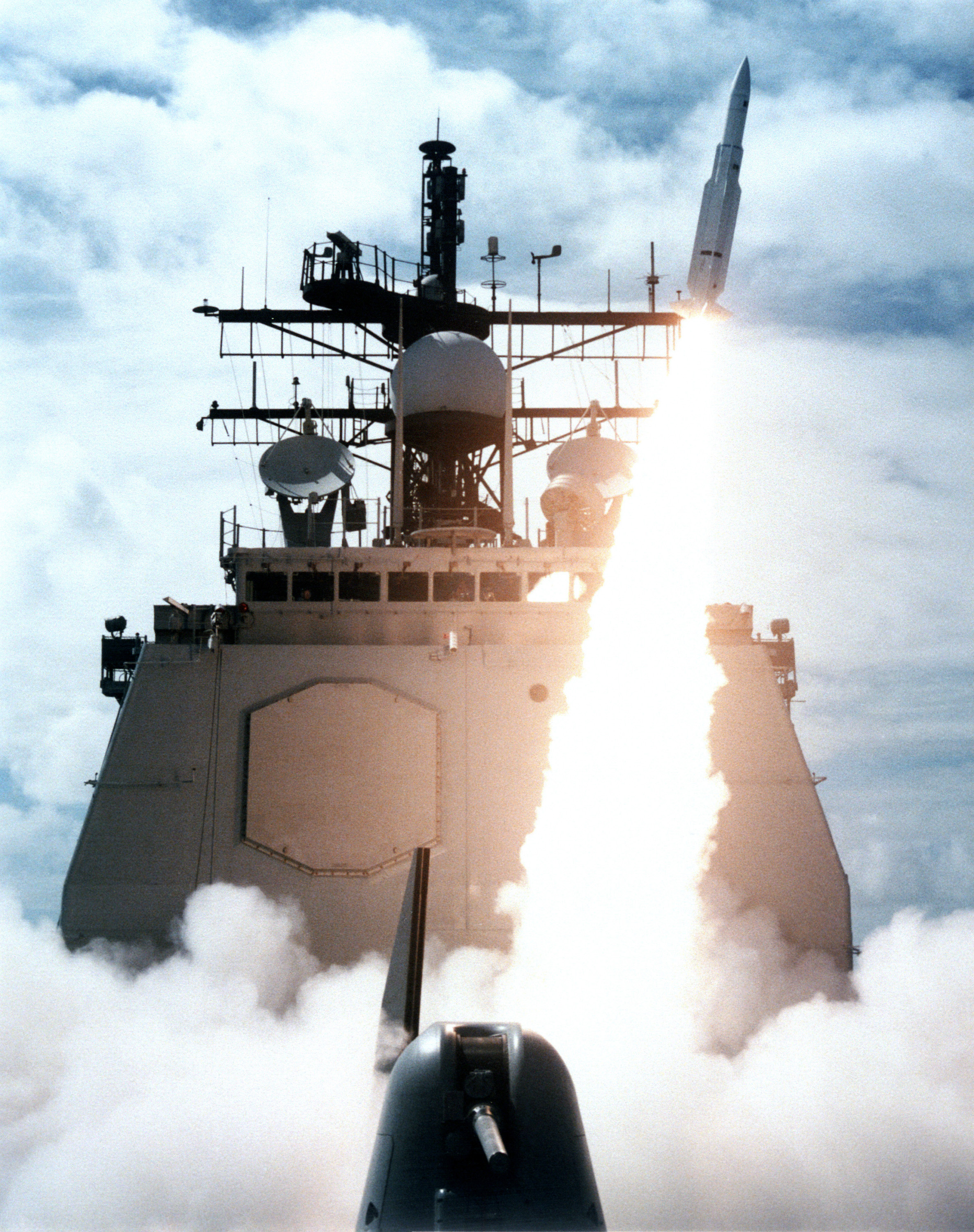
USS Vincennes

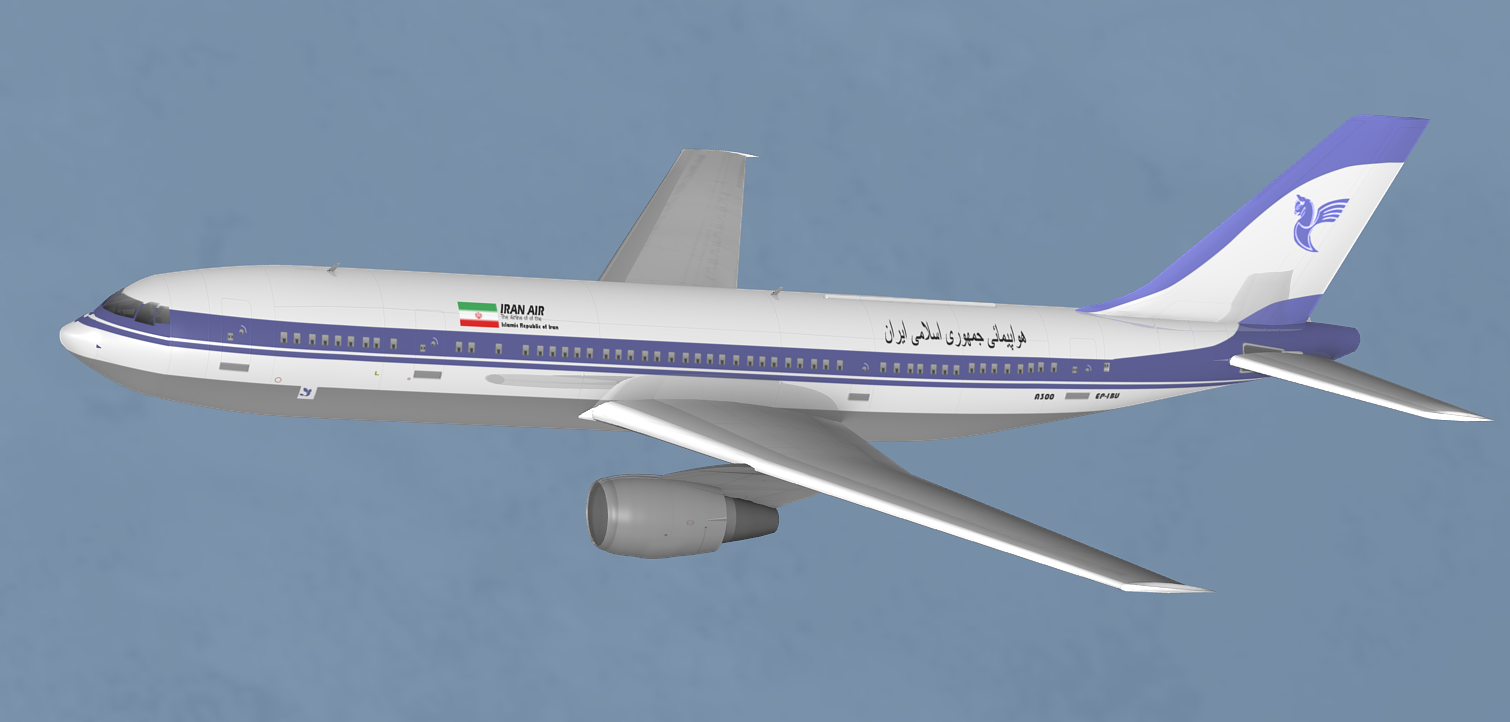
Iran Air Flight 655

July 3: Shootdown of Iran Air Flight 655 by the USS Vincennes
- 18 April – Operation Praying Mantis
- 3 July – Iran Air Flight 655, a civilian airliner was shot down by the USS Vincennes over the Persian Gulf, killing all 290 passengers and crew on board.
- 19 July – 1988 executions of Iranian political prisoners
- 20 August – The Iran–Iraq War ceasefire marked the end of the conflict that had lasted nearly eight years. The United Nations brokered the ceasefire, bringing an end to hostilities between Iran and Iraq. The war resulted in significant casualties and had wide-ranging regional implications.

== See also ==
- Years in Iraq
- Years in Afghanistan
