= 1856 in Iran =

- Decades
- See also: Other events of 1856; Years in Iran

The following lists events that happened during 1856 in Qajar era.

== Incumbents ==
- Monarch: Naser al-Din Shah Qajar

== Births ==
- July 2 – Morteza Gholi Khan Hedayat, Iranian politician.
- July 22 – Kamran Mirza Nayeb es-Saltaneh, Iranian field marshal.
- ? – Ali-Qoli Khan Bakhtiari, Iranian revolutionary.
- ? – Javad Sa'd al-Dowleh, Iranian politician.
- ? – Mirza Mahmud Khan Hakim ol-Molk, Iranian politician and physician.
