= 1998 in Iran =

- Decades: 1970s; 1980s; 1990s; 2000s; 2010s
- See also: Other events of 1998; Years in Iran

Events from the year 1998 in Iran.

== Incumbents ==
- Supreme Leader: Ali Khamenei
- President: Mohammad Khatami
- Vice President: Hassan Habibi
- Chief Justice: Mohammad Yazdii

== Sports ==
- 1997–98 Iranian Basketball League Division One.

== Establishments ==
- Islamic Iran Participation Front.

== See also ==
- Years in Iraq
- Years in Afghanistan
