= 1991 in Iran =

- Decades: 1970s; 1980s; 1990s; 2000s; 2010s
- See also: Other events of 1991; Years in Iran

Events from the year 1991 in Iran.

== Incumbents ==
- Supreme Leader: Ali Khamenei
- President: Akbar Hashemi Rafsanjani
- Vice President: Hassan Habibi
- Chief Justice: Mohammad Yazdii

== Events ==
The United Nations Security Council identified Iraq as the aggressor of the Iran–Iraq War on 9 December 1991

== Births ==
- 23 September – Bakhtiar Rahmani.
- 22 November – Amir Sharafi.

== See also ==
- Years in Iraq
- Years in Afghanistan
