= 1996 in Iran =

- Decades: 1970s; 1980s; 1990s; 2000s; 2010s
- See also: Other events of 1996; Years in Iran

Events from the year 1996 in Iran.

== Incumbents ==
- Supreme Leader: Ali Khamenei
- President: Akbar Hashemi Rafsanjani
- Vice President: Hassan Habibi
- Chief Justice: Mohammad Yazdii

== Events ==
- Iranian legislative election, 1996

== Deaths ==
- 7 December – Ali Hatami

== See also ==
- Years in Iraq
- Years in Afghanistan
