= 1865 in Iran =

- Decades
- See also: Other events of 1865; Years in Iran

The following lists events that happened during 1865 in Qajar era.

== Incumbents ==
- Monarch: Naser al-Din Shah Qajar
