= 1980 in Iran =

- Decades: 1960s; 1970s; 1980s; 1990s; 2000s
- See also: Other events of 1980; Years in Iran

Events from the year 1980 in Iran.

== Incumbents ==
- Supreme Leader: Ruhollah Khomeini
- President: Abolhassan Banisadr (starting February 4)
- Prime Minister: Council of Islamic Revolution (until August 12), Mohammad-Ali Rajai (starting August 12)
- Chief Justice: Mohammad Beheshti

== Events ==
- Beginning of Iran–Iraq War by Iraq.
  - September 23 – Iran Air Force launched Operation Kaman 99 against Iraqi offensive.
  - September 30 – Iranian Air Force launched Operation Scorch Sword against Iraqi nuclear developments in Osirak.
  - October 9 – Iran Air force launched Operation Sultan 10 against Iraqi offensive.
  - November 6 – Iraqi army started Siege of Abadan.
  - November 10 – Iraqi army recaptured Iranian town of Khorramshahr
  - November 28–29 – Iranian Navy and Air Force dismantled most of Iraqi navy in Operation Morvarid.

== See also ==
- Years in Iraq
- Years in Afghanistan
