= 1971 in Iran =

- Decades: 1950s; 1960s; 1970s; 1980s; 1990s
- See also: Other events of 1971; Years in Iran

Events from the year 1971 in Iran.

== Incumbents ==
- Shah: Mohammad Reza Pahlavi
- Prime Minister: Amir-Abbas Hoveida

== Events ==
- 2 February: Ramsar Convention
- 8 February: Siahkal incident
- 9 July: 1971 Iranian legislative election
- 12–16 October: 2,500 year celebration of the Persian Empire
- 30 November: Abu Musa and the Greater and Lesser Tunbs conflict

== Births ==
- 12 June – Arman Alizad, tailor, columnist and TV personality
- 28 July – Mansour
- 10 November – Niki Karimi
- Mojtaba Mirtahmasb

== See also ==
- Years in Iraq
- Years in Afghanistan
