= Dadkhah =

Dadkhah is a surname. Notable people with the surname include:

- Mohamed Dadkhah (1910–1980), Iranian philatelist
- Mohammad Ali Dadkhah, Iranian lawyer
- Negin Dadkhah (born 1990), Iranian speed skater
