= 1979 in Iran =

- Decades: 1950s; 1960s; 1970s; 1980s; 1990s
- See also: Other events of 1979; Years in Iran

Events from the year 1979 in Iran.

== Incumbents ==
- Shah: Mohammad Reza Pahlavi (until February 11)
- Supreme Leader: Ruhollah Khomeini (starting December 3)
- Prime Minister:
  - until January 4: Gholam-Reza Azhari
  - January 4 – February 11: Shapour Bakhtiar
  - February 11 – November 6: Mehdi Bazargan
  - starting November 6: Council of Islamic Revolution
- Chief Justice: Mohammad Beheshti (starting 3 June)

== Events ==
- Iranian Revolution

== See also ==
- Years in Iraq
- Years in Afghanistan
