= 1993 in Iran =

- Decades: 1970s; 1980s; 1990s; 2000s; 2010s
- See also: Other events of 1993; Years in Iran

Events from the year 1993 in Iran.

== Incumbents ==
- Supreme Leader: Ali Khamenei
- President: Akbar Hashemi Rafsanjani
- Vice President: Hassan Habibi
- Chief Justice: Mohammad Yazdii

== Events ==
- 1993 Iranian presidential election

== Births ==
- 3 June – Alireza Ramezani.
- 24 July – Rouzbeh Cheshmi, footballer
- 11 August – Alireza Jahanbakhsh.

== Deaths ==
- 1 February – Mehrab Shahrokhi.

== See also ==
- Years in Iraq
- Years in Afghanistan
