= 1997 in Iran =

- Decades: 1970s; 1980s; 1990s; 2000s; 2010s
- See also: Other events of 1997; Years in Iran

Events from the year 1997 in Iran.

== Incumbents ==
- Supreme Leader: Ali Khamenei
- President: Akbar Hashemi Rafsanjani (until August 2), Mohammad Khatami (starting August 2)
- Vice President: Hassan Habibi
- Chief Justice: Mohammad Yazdii

== Events ==
- Iranian presidential election, 1997
- 2 August – Mohammad Khatami became president of Iran.

== See also ==
- Years in Iraq
- Years in Afghanistan
