= 1992 in Iran =

- Decades: 1970s; 1980s; 1990s; 2000s; 2010s
- See also: Other events of 1992; Years in Iran

The following events occurred in Iran in the year 1992.

== Incumbents ==
- Supreme Leader: Ali Khamenei
- President: Akbar Hashemi Rafsanjani
- Vice President: Hassan Habibi
- Chief Justice: Mohammad Yazdii
- 19 October – death of Habibollah Badiee

== Births ==
- 16 July – Saeid Lotfi

== See also ==
- Years in Iraq
- Years in Afghanistan
