= 1995 in Iran =

- Decades: 1970s; 1980s; 1990s; 2000s; 2010s
- See also: Other events of 1995; Years in Iran

Events from the year 1995 in Iran.

== Incumbents ==
- Supreme Leader: Ali Khamenei
- President: Akbar Hashemi Rafsanjani
- Vice President: Hassan Habibi
- Chief Justice: Mohammad Yazdii

== Births ==
- 4 March – Mahan Baghdadi

== See also ==
- Years in Iraq
- Years in Afghanistan
