= 1989 in Iran =

- Decades: 1960s; 1970s; 1980s; 1990s; 2000s
- See also: Other events of 1989; Years in Iran

Events from the year 1989 in Iran.

== Incumbents ==
- Supreme Leader: Ruhollah Khomeini (until June 3), Ali Khamenei (starting June 4)
- President: Ali Khamenei (until August 3), Akbar Hashemi Rafsanjani (starting August 3)
- Prime Minister: Mir-Hossein Mousavi (until August 3)
- Vice President: Hassan Habibi (starting September 1)
- Chief Justice: Mohammad Yazdii (until June 30), Mahmoud Hashemi Shahroudi (starting June 30)

== Events ==
- 3 June – Ruhollah Khomeini dies.
- 3 August – Ali Khamenei left as the president of Iran.

== See also ==
- Years in Iraq
- Years in Afghanistan
