= 1977 in Iran =

- Decades: 1950s; 1960s; 1970s; 1980s; 1990s
- See also: Other events of 1977; Years in Iran

Events from the year 1977 in Iran.

== Incumbents ==
- Shah: Mohammad Reza Pahlavi
- Prime Minister: Amir-Abbas Hoveida (until August 7), Jamshid Amouzegar (starting August 7)

== Events ==
- 19 December – The Bob–Tangol earthquake strikes Kerman province, killing 584–665 people and causing local destruction.

== Births ==
- May – Maryam Mirzakhani.
- 23 September – Amir Reza Salari

== See also ==
- Years in Iraq
- Years in Afghanistan
