= 1970 in Iran =

- Decades: 1950s; 1960s; 1970s; 1980s; 1990s
- See also: Other events of 1970; Years in Iran

Events from the year 1970 in Iran.

== Incumbents ==
- Shah: Mohammad Reza Pahlavi
- Prime Minister: Amir-Abbas Hoveida

== Births ==
- 31 October – Omid Tahvili

== See also ==
- Years in Iraq
- Years in Afghanistan
