= Iran and Red and Black Colonization =

1978 newspaper article attacking Ruhollah Khomeini

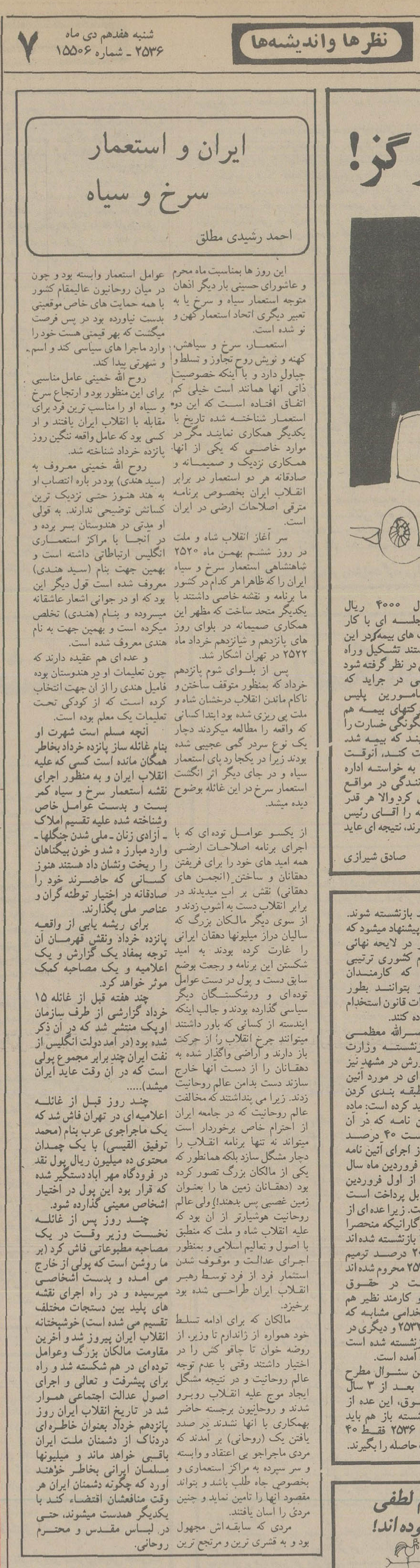
"Iran and Red and Black Colonization".

"Iran and Red and Black Colonization" (Persian: ایران و استعمار سرخ و سیاه, romanized: Irân va este'amâr-e sorx-o siyâh) was an article written under the pseudonym "Ahmad Rashidi Motlagh" published in the Ettela'at newspaper on 7 January 1978 (17 Dey 1356 SH or 2536 Shahanshahi). The article was used to attack Ruhollah Khomeini, who later founded the Islamic Republic of Iran. It led to the 1978 Qom protest.

== Background ==
The hostilities between Iran and Iraq ended with a treaty proposed in 1975. Iranians were allowed to travel to Iraq in 1976. As a result, many tapes and writings of the Ayatollah Khomeini, who was in exile in Iraq, were brought into Iran. Disapproval of the Shah was increasing in Iranian mosques. People were demanding that the Constitution of 1906/07 be fully restored. Articles in the constitution included: the right to free elections, a government responsible to the elected legislative body or the Majles, a Shah with limited authority, and a committee of mujtahids to veto bills not deemed to be in accord with Muslim law.

In October 1977, the mysterious death of Khomeini's son Mostafa caused the people's dissatisfaction to grow, in part because journalists Nikki Keddie and Yann Richard attributed his death to SAVAK, Iran's secret police.

== Content ==
In January 1978, in an attempt to reduce religious opposition inciting people against the Shah, the Iranian newspaper Ettela'at published an article entitled "Iran and Red and Black Colonization" referring to an alleged alliance between communist (red) and religious Islamist (black) forces against the reforms of the White Revolution and attacking Ruhollah Khomeini as a foreign agent opposing the reforms and instigating the 15 Khordad uprising. The article was published one week after a speech by President Jimmy Carter in which he referred to Iran as an "island of stability" in one of the more troubled areas of the world:

It was not difficult to find such a man [...] They had found him, a man with an unclear past. He belonged to the most reactionary and fundamentalist classes. Despite foreign support, he did not wield any influence whatsoever, and longed therefore for an opportunity, to dedicate himself to political adventurism and hoped to gain fame in this way. Ruhollah Khomeini was the most suitable character which red and black colonialism could have possibly found. The shameful events of 1963 are to be counted against his conscience [...] and his name survives in living memory entirely due to the shameful events of 1963. In that time he attempted to execute the plans of red and black colonialism, by revolting against land reform, against the emancipation of women and the nationalization of the forests, thereby costing the lives of innocent people.

A few weeks before the revolt it became known in Tehran that an Arab adventurer by the name of Mohammad Tofigh al-Gheisi had been apprehended with ten million Rial in cash, being carried in his briefcase. That cash was to have been transferred to certain individuals.

Thankfully, the Iranian revolution succeeded. The resistance of the landlords and elements of the Tudeh Party was crushed and the ground leveled for the creation of the path toward progress and social justice. The events of 1963, however, will remain a painful memory in the history of Iran. Millions of believers will not forget, how the enemies of the nation united when their interests so demanded, even if they found themselves taking the form of the clergy.

-- ^{Ettela'at Newspaper, 7th of January, 1978.}

On 4 January 1978, the article "Iran and Red and Black Colonization" was sealed in the Imperial Court and sent from Prime Minister Amir-Abbas Hoveyda, who is thought to have written it, to Information Minister Daryush Homayun for publication in one of Iran's newspapers. The regime saw the article as a way to attack its religious opponents. It was published on 7 January 1978 in Ettela'at, printed in red ink on page 7 in the section known as "Comments and Ideas". The article contained offensive content about Ayatollah Khomeini, who was described as a foreign agent. Khomeini was attacked as an adventurer who was faithless and devoted to colonialism. The article described him as an Indian Sayyed who had lived for some time in India, and had contact with British colonial centres. The article was written at the Imperial Court based on documents that had been collected by SAVAK. Because the original text of the article was relatively tame, the Shah had allegedly ordered it to be rewritten and its tone had then become more insulting.

Ahmad Rashidi Motlagh was the fictitious name of the author of "Iran and Red and Black Colonization". According to Bahman Baktiari, the main authors of the article were Daryush Homayun and Farhad Nikukhah, a low-ranking ministry official. The day that the article was published fell on the anniversary of the unveiling when Reza Shah had declared the law banning women from wearing the hijab.

== Reaction ==
One day after the publication of the article, it was met with huge protests in Qom. Classes at Qom's seminary were cancelled. People went to the homes of Marja' in Tehran and Qom to show their support. In the evening, at the Azam Mosque of Qom, they chanted slogans such as "Long live Khomeini" and "Death to the Pahlavi regime".

On 9 January, the protests continued and grew larger. The Bazaar was closed. In the afternoon, police began firing into the crowd killing and injuring many people. The day after the shootings, people gathered to protest and to commemorate the deaths in many Iranian cities including: Tabriz, Yazd, Isfahan, Shiraz, Jahrom, and Ahwaz.

The article's publication was generally recognized as the beginning of the Iranian Revolution and four hundred days later the Pahlavi dynasty was overthrown. This article had the effect of placing Khomeini at the center of the revolutionary movement.

== See also ==
- Civil resistance
- History of Iran
- History of the Islamic Republic of Iran
- 1979 energy crisis
- History of political Islam in Iran
- Iran hostage crisis
- Organizations of the Iranian Revolution
