= 1972 in Iran =

- Decades: 1950s; 1960s; 1970s; 1980s; 1990s
- See also: Other events of 1972; Years in Iran

The following lists events that happened during 1972 in Iran.

== Incumbents ==
- Shah: Mohammad Reza Pahlavi
- Prime Minister: Amir-Abbas Hoveida

== Events ==
=== February ===
- 9 February – The 1972 Iran blizzard ended after seven days, during which as much as 26 feet of snow buried villages in northwestern, central and southern Iran. An estimated 4,000 people were killed, particularly in the area around Ardakan.

=== April ===
- 10 April – The 6.7 M_{w} Qir earthquake shook southern Iran with a maximum Mercalli intensity of IX (Violent), killing 5,374 and injuring 1,710.

== Births ==
- 7 May – Asghar Farhadi.
- 31 July – Tami Stronach, Iranian-born dancer and former actress
