= 1974 in Iran =

- Decades: 1950s; 1960s; 1970s; 1980s; 1990s
- See also: Other events of 1974; Years in Iran

Events from the year 1974 in Iran.

== Incumbents ==
- Shah: Mohammad Reza Pahlavi
- Prime Minister: Amir-Abbas Hoveida

== Births ==
- 17 January – Ladan and Laleh Bijani, conjoined twin sisters (d. 2003)

== Deaths ==
- 25 February – Hossein Tehrani

== See also ==
- Years in Iraq
- Years in Afghanistan
