= 1975 in Iran =

- Decades: 1950s; 1960s; 1970s; 1980s; 1990s
- See also: Other events of 1975; Years in Iran

The following lists events that happened during 1975 in Iran.

== Incumbents ==
- Shah: Mohammad Reza Pahlavi
- Prime Minister: Amir-Abbas Hoveida

== Events ==
=== March ===
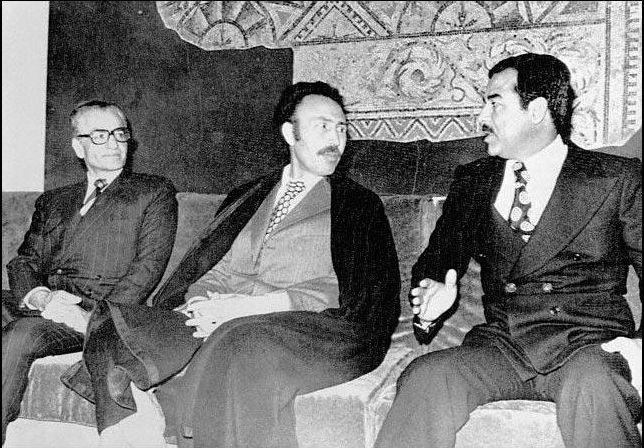
Houari Boumediene (center) with Saddam Hussein (right) and Mohammad Reza Shah Pahlavi (left) during the 1975 Algiers Agreement

- March 1 – An Iraqi Airways airliner was hijacked by three Kurdish gunmen, shortly after taking off from Mosul to Baghdad with 93 people on board. The hijackers (Ahmad Hasan, Taha Naimi and Faud al-Qeitan) demanded that 85 Kurdish political prisoners be released, that they receive five million dollars, and that they be flown to Iran. After the plane made a forced landing in Tehran on a blocked runway, a gunbattle ensued between Iraqi security guards onboard and the gunmen. One passenger were killed and ten others wounded, including Hasan, who later died of his wounds. Taimi and al-Qeitan were executed a month later by a firing squad in Iran.
- March 2 – Shah Mohammad Reza Pahlavi declared the kingdom to be a one-party state, with the new "Rastakhiz (Resurgence) Party" to be led by Prime Minister Amir-Abbas Hoveyda.
- March 4 – Iran signed a trade deal pledging to spend 22 billion dollars in the United States over a ten-year period.
- March 6 – Iran and Iraq announced a settlement in their border dispute, at a meeting of the OPEC nations in Algiers. The Shah of Iran signed on behalf of his nation, while Iraq was represented by Saddam Hussein, an aide to President Ahmed Hassan al-Bakr and future President of Iraq. The meeting was overseen by Algerian President Houari Boumediene. Iraq agreed to drop claims to half of the Shatt al-Arab, while Iran agreed not to supply weapons to Kurdish separatists in northern Iraq.

== See also ==
- Years in Iraq
- Years in Afghanistan
