= Jalal Maghami =

Iranian voice actor (1941–2022)

- جلال مقامی
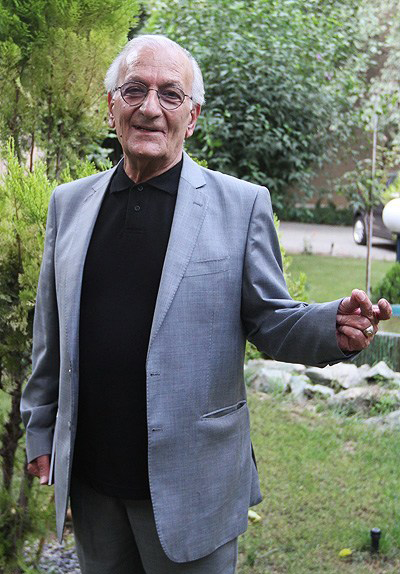
- Born: 24 July 1941; Kashan, Imperial State of Iran
- Died: 27 October 2022; Karaj, Iran
- Resting place: Behesht-e Zahra
- Occupation: Voice acting
- Years active: 1958–2000
- Known for: Doubler of famous actors of world cinema
- Spouse: Rafat Hashempour

Jalal Maghami (Persian: جلال مقامی; 24 July 1941 – 5 November 2022) was an Iranian voice actor, announcer, and dubbing manager. He was also known for performing in the program "Didaniha".

== Career ==
He entered the field of dubbing in 1958 and worked on both foreign and Iranian films.

In the eighties, he was known as Robin Williams' constant voiceover and appeared in several films of the actor.

== Filmography ==
=== Dubbing ===
Covered Actor	Film
Robin Williams	Mrs. Doubtfire; Jumanji; Good Will Hunting; Bicentennial Man; Insomnia
Robert Redford	The Chase; Barefoot in the Park; Butch Cassidy and the Sundance Kid; All the President's Men
Steve McQueen	The War Lover; The Magnificent Seven
Michael Caine	The Ipcress File; Billion Dollar Brain; Zee and Co. The Man Who Would Be King
Marcello Mastroianni	Cronaca familiare
Dustin Lee Hoffman	The Graduate; Midnight Cowboy

== Personal life ==
He was married to Rafat Hashempour.

On 24 November 2013, he suffered a stroke and speech disorder. He died on the evening of Thursday, 5 November 2022, due to cardiac arrest and was buried in the plot of artists of Behesht Zahra.
