= Forests of Iran =

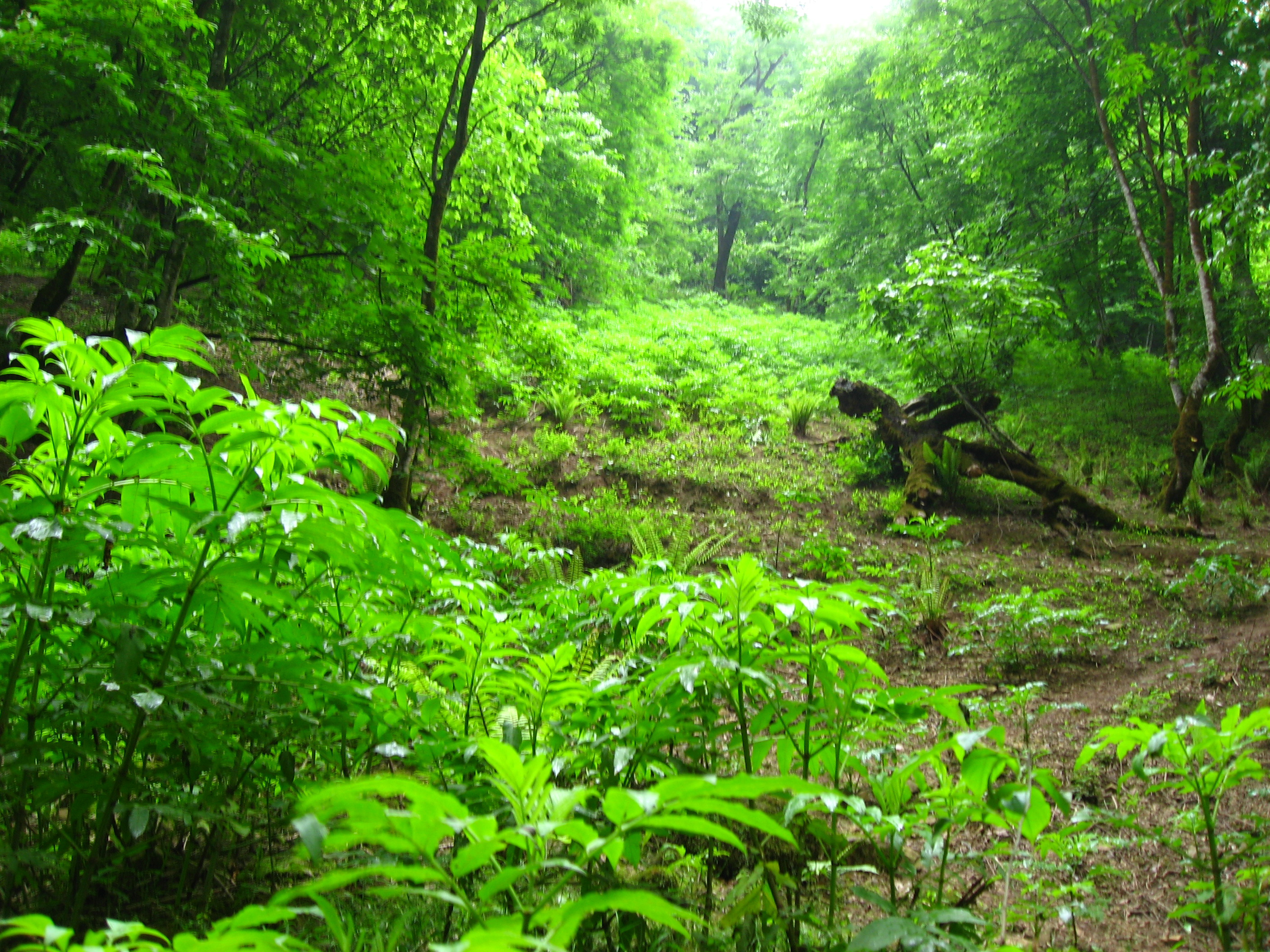
Forests of northern Iran

Iran's forests are located in the northern regions and on the southern shores of the Caspian Sea. These forests have a temperate humid climate and are extended from the east of Ardabil province to North Khorasan province. They also spread and cover the three provinces of Gilan, Mazandaran, and Golestan. The Alborz mountain range, which is the highest mountain range in the Middle East, stands like a wall against the moisture of the Caspian Sea and prevents the moisture coming into the central regions of Iran; therefore, these clouds are forced to rain in the northern areas of the country leaving the central areas dry and barren.

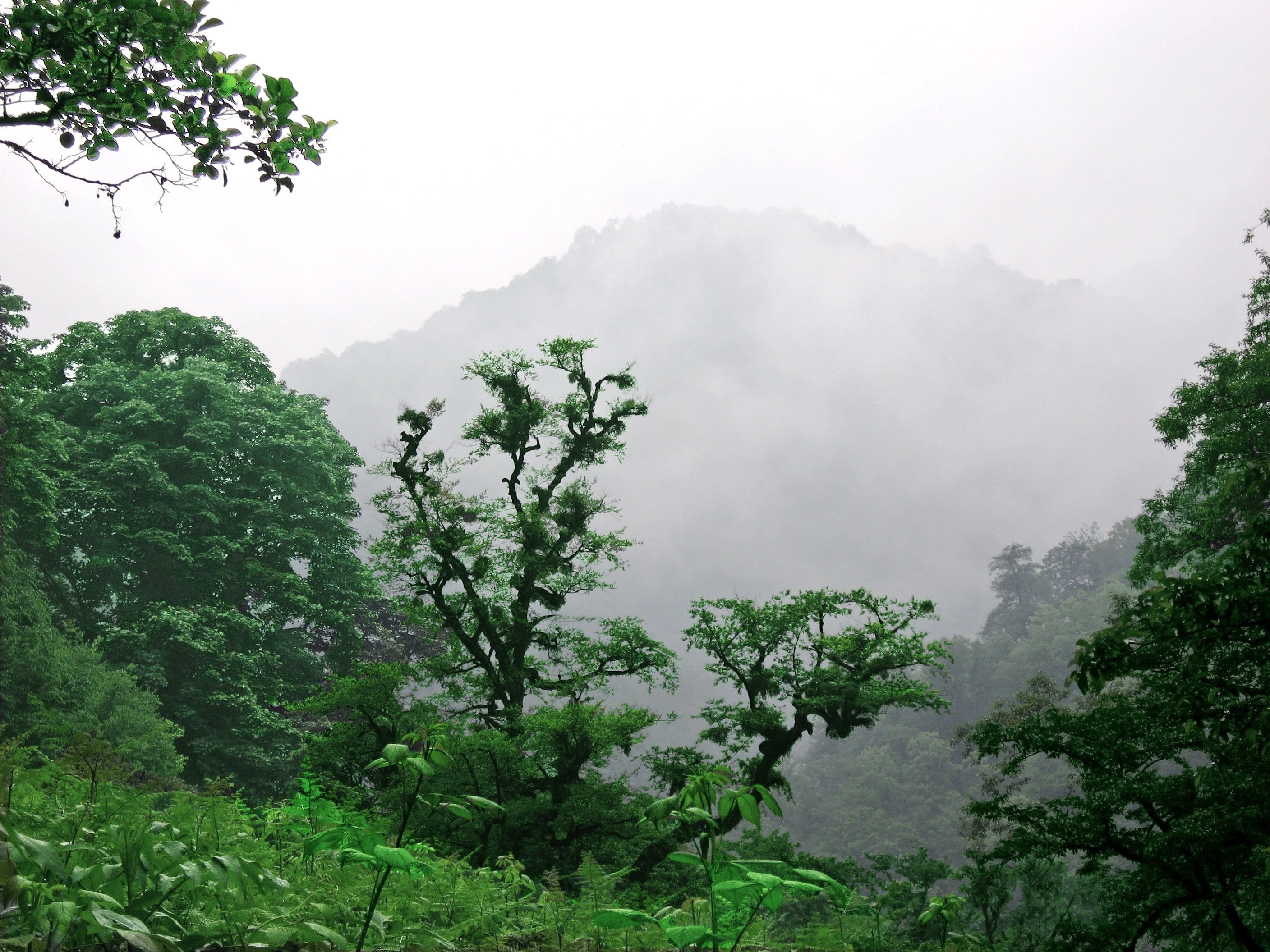
Forests of northern Iran, Gilan region

There are 3.4 million hectares (13,000 mi^{2}) of forests on the northern slopes of the Alborz Mountains and the coastal provinces of the Caspian Sea. Other parts of the country have forests up to 3 million hectares (12,000 mi^{2}). Of these forests, only 1.3 million hectares (5,000 mi^{2}) can be used for industrial exploitation, the rest of the forests are not exploited due to lack of proper maintenance or natural damage. According to the records, Iran had many and varied forests from ancient times to the beginning of the eighteenth century. During the Achaemenid period, the expanse of forests in Iran with the current borders reached more than 16 million hectares (62,000 mi^{2}). Deforestation in Iran began after the Mongol invasion and reached its highest point in the last three centuries. During the Qajar dynasty, about 130,000 t (130,000 long tons; 140,000 short tons) of charcoal were produced and exported abroad by cutting down the forest trees.

== Nationalization of forests and fields ==
The government's program included the nationalization of the forests, fields, waters, and natural resources.

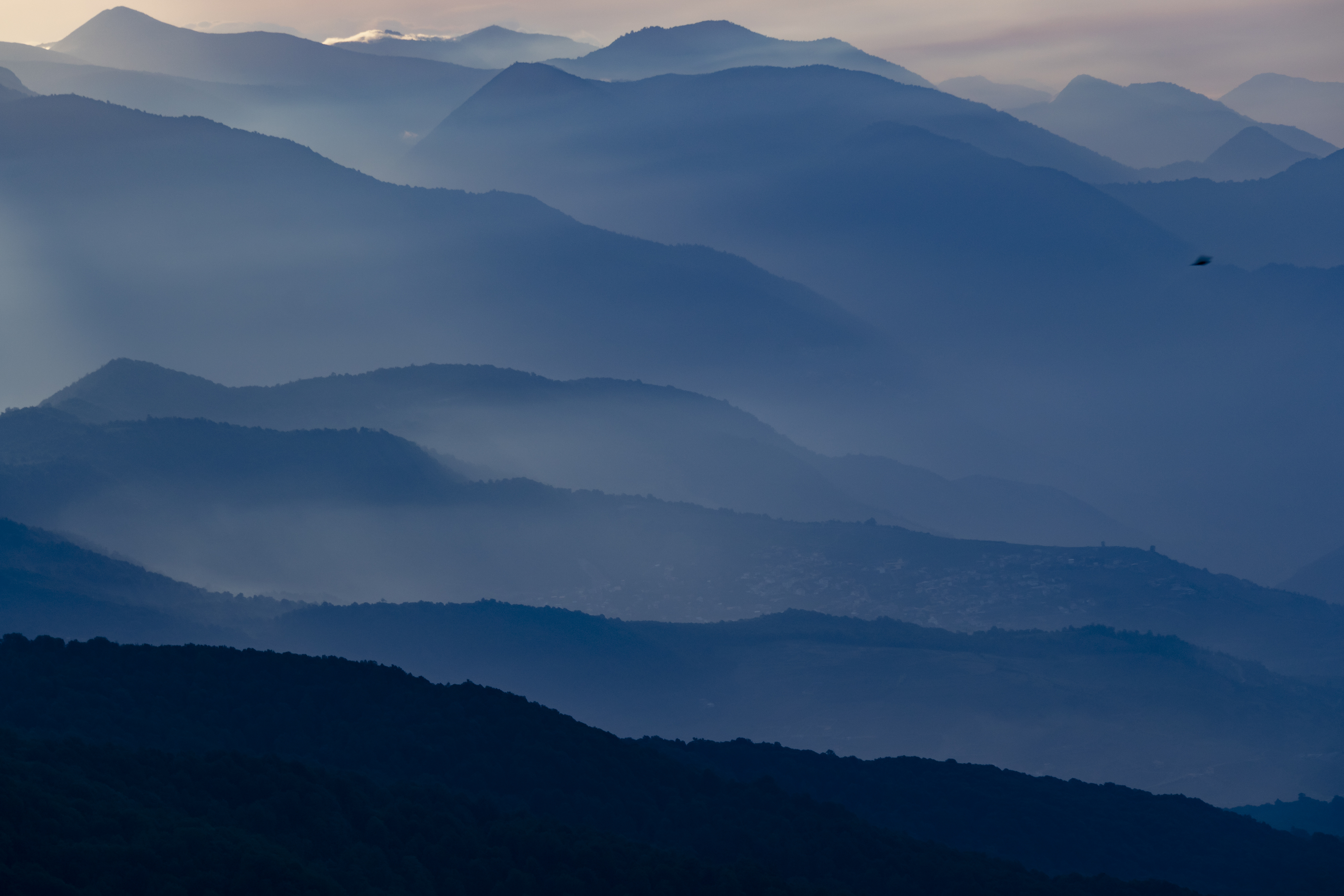
Forest mountains of Philband region in Mazandaran province

On January 26, 1963, forests were declared national according to the framework of the White Revolution. In accordance with the second principle of the White Revolution, about 120 million hectares (460,000 mi^{2}) of forests and fields, known as green gold mines, were given to the government for national exploitation.

== Trees and soil erosion ==
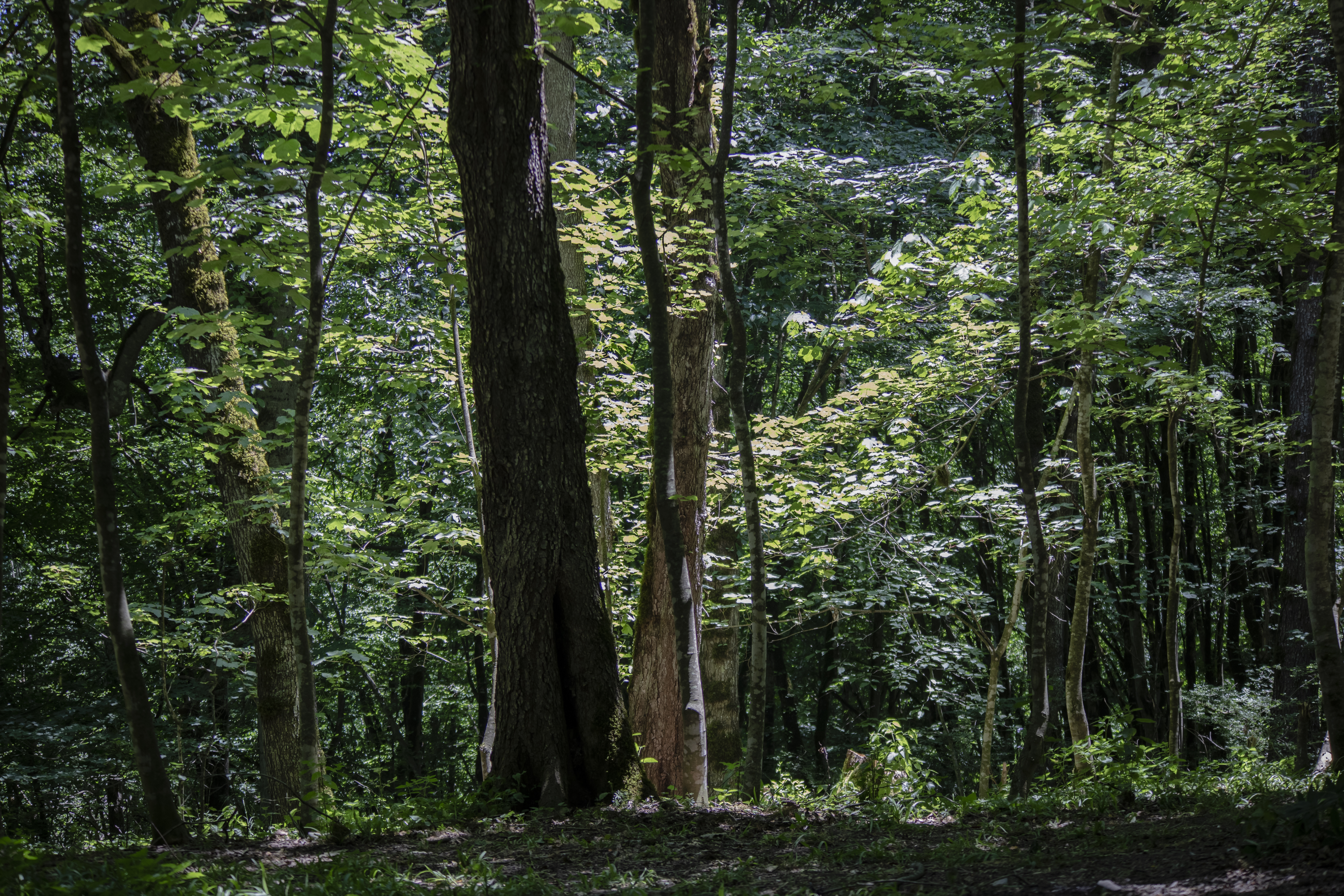
Forest trees in Lavij region in northern Iran

Trees, shrubs, and vegetation in general have an effective role in maintaining the stability of the soil and increasing their permeability. The surface soil that can be used by humans is not more than a few centimetres, so its preservation is vital. In barren areas, wind erosion is the main cause of soil degradation and in windy areas, trees are an effective factor in soil stabilization. In dry areas, wind erosion has been the main cause of soil degradation, and in windy areas, trees are considered to be a factor in soil stabilization.

== Deforestation ==
According to government statistics, over 1.5 million square metres (16×10^{6} sq ft) of wood were harvested from the forests of northern Iran during the years 2010 and 2011. The head of the Forestry Association reported that this figure represents official data but illegal logging is also ongoing, which contributes further to overall forest loss. Forest specialists have stated that the northern forests of Iran have suffered extensive damage and predict that if this trend continues, the forests of northern Iran will face the same fate as the country's other forests. Currently, biodiversity and wildlife in the northern forests have already been significantly reduced. Additionally, experts have identified the destruction of vegetation cover and tree cutting in the region as one of the causes of devastating floods in northern Iran.

The head of Iran's Environmental Protection Organization has also stated that over the past five decades, Iran's forested area has decreased from 18 million hectares (69,000 mi^{2}) to 14 million hectares (54,000 mi^{2}). The deforested land has subsequently turned into desert. It is estimated that 63,000 hectares (240 mi^{2}) of the Zagros and northern forests of Iran are destroyed annually.

The Food and Agriculture Organization (FAO) has reported that Iran is one of 70 developing countries worldwide with limited forest cover, and this scarce forest cover is being destroyed at a faster rate than in other regions globally.

== Climate ==
Some forests (for example, evergreen forests) are less affected by climate change; others (for example, temperate deciduous forests) are severely affected, losing all their leaves each fall.

The growth of the trees in the forests depends on several factors, mainly sunlight, type of soil and water, temperature, and the genetic potential of trees. Most of these factors are directly or indirectly related to the weather

In summer, the temperature inside the forest is usually between 6–8 °F (−14 – −13 °C) lower than the temperature outside the forest, but in winter the temperature in the forest is very close to the outdoor temperature and sometimes a few degrees warmer. The outdoor soil temperature on a summer day may reach to 90 °F (32 °C), while soil temperature in a nearby forest lines to 20 °F (−7 °C).

== Forest regions of Iran ==
Iran's forests can be divided into five vegetation regions:

1. Hyrcanian region (Caspian) which forms the green belt of the north side of the country.

2. The region of Iran and Turan, which are mainly scattered in the center of Iran.

3. Zagros region, which mainly contains oak forests in the west of the country.

4. The Persian Gulf region, which is scattered in the southern coastal belt.

5. Arasbarani region, which contains rare and unique species.

The country ranks 45th among 56 countries with forests in the world.

== Caspian Sea Region ==
The forests in the north part of the country, which are known as the forests of the Hyrcanian or Caspian vegetation zone, wet forests, and industrial forests of the north, such as the green strip of the southern Caspian Sea and the northern profile of the Alborz mountain range from Astara to Glidaghi, approximately 800 km (500 mi) long, 20 to 70 km (12 to 43 mi) wide, and an altitude of 2,800 metres (9,200 ft) meters above sea level.

So far, 80 species of trees (mainly broadleaf), four species of native conifers, and 50 species of shrubs have been identified in these forests, most of which are mixed species of beech, hornbeam, oak, maple, and alder.

These forests are remnants of the third geological period. But the reason for the scarcity of conifers in the Hyrcanian forests is the lack of progress and expansion of glaciers in the late third and early fourth geological period in these areas.

This area in the north is the green belt of the country in Gilan, Mazandaran, and Golestan. The Hyrcanian region has a humid climate and is affected by the Caspian Sea.

In the 1960s the state brought the Caspian forest belt under national control, implementing conservation and administrative measures that prohibited permanent residence within woodland areas. As a result, the forest-dwelling population—largely pastoralists who relied on grazing, seasonal movement, and forest resources—was forcibly relocated to adjacent villages. This policy dismantled longstanding patterns of habitation and subsistence, reshaping both local settlement structures and traditional relations between these communities and the forest environment.
