= Khalil Oghab =

Iranian wrestler and actor (1924–2023)

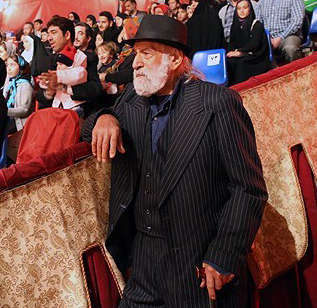
- Khalil 2013
- Born: Khalil Tariqat-Peima خلیل طریقت‌پیما; 21 March 1924; Shiraz, Iran
- Died: 20 April 2023 (aged 98)
- Occupations: Athlete, actor
- Years active: 1950–1980
- Known for: Lifting a 2-ton elephant
- Notable work
- Children: 2

Khalil Oghab (Persian: خلیل عقاب; 23 March 1924 – 20 April 2023), nicknamed Khalil the Hero (پهلوان خلیل), was an Iranian actor and wrestler. He holds the Guinness World Record for lifting a 2-ton elephant.

== Early life ==
Khalil Tariqat-Peima, nicknamed "Khalil Oghab" (lit. 'Khalil the Eagle') and "Pahlevan Khalil" (lit. 'Khalil the Hero'), was born in 1924 in Shiraz, Iran. His father was a farmer from the city of Fasa in Fars province. Khalil was interested in ancient sports since his childhood.

At age 14, he started practicing ancient sports. He excelled in "grabbing" and lifting heavy weights. At 30 he lifted 450 kilograms with his teeth. Between 1930 and 1950, he performed several shows throughout Iran.

== Filmography ==
- Violent Men (1971)
- Baba's Hero (1971)
- The Sin of Beauty (1969)
- Desert Giant (1969)
- Desert Man (1968)
- Koh Zad (1967)
- The Flowers of Hope (1964)
