= 1978 Qom protest =

Event in the lead up to the Iranian Revolution

1978 Qom protests
- Part of Iranian Revolution
- Date: 9 January 1978
- Location: Qom, Iran
- Caused by: Publication of an article in Ettela'at insulting Imam Khomeini
- Methods: Demonstration
- Result: Countrywide demonstrations and strikes, subsequently leading to the Iranian Revolution

Casualties
- Deaths: 5–300; 40–200 (per Hossein Bashiriyeh)

The 1978 Qom protest (Persian: تظاهرات ۱۹ دی قم) was a demonstration against the Pahlavi dynasty ignited by the "Iran and Red and Black Colonization" article published on 7 January 1978 in Ettela'at newspaper, one of the two publications with the largest circulation in Iran. The article insulted Khomeini, who later founded the Islamic Republic of Iran.

The events started on 7 January 1978, followed by the closing of bazaars and seminaries, with students rallying towards the homes of religious leaders on the next day. On 9 January 1978, seminary students and others held a demonstration in the city, which faced a crackdown by the Shah's security forces, who used live ammunition to disperse the crowd when the peaceful demonstration turned violent. Between 5 and 300 of the demonstrators were reportedly killed in the protest. 9 January 1978 (19 Dey) is regarded as a bloody day in Qom.

== Prelude ==
Previously, a June 1975 protest in Qom, staged by seminary students, was violently suppressed by security forces. On 7 January 1978, an article insulting Khomeini was published by a pseudonymous author in Ettela'at, an afternoon newspaper in Tehran. The article was approved for publication by Dariush Homayoon, the spokesperson for the Ministry of Information at the time. He said that the article was sent to him by the Ministry of the Court under the Shah's order, and that he was unaware of the article's content. According to David Menashri, "the religious leaders equated a personal attack on Khomeini with an attack on Islam as such. Moreover, being familiar with the regime's methods of manipulating the press, they concluded that the article had been fed to Ettela'at by the authorities. The religious leadership, therefore, regarded the publication of the article as heralding a campaign against them by the government." Speaking in a press interview, Ayatollah Shariatmadari said that the article had "besmirched our faith" and "shocked all Muslims in Iran."

== Timeline ==
=== 7 January ===
Even though the newspaper had not yet reached Qom, news of the insulting article had spread across the city. Thus, on Saturday evening, 7 January 1978, when the truck carrying newspapers approached the city of Qom, a large number of people immediately attacked it and set fire to the newspapers. A report by SAVAK, the Shah's intelligence agency, described the event as such: "In tonight's demonstration, they tore up about 100 Ettela'at newspapers to show their protest. In addition, as a protest against the insult that was given to Khomeini in the Ettela'at newspaper, all the seminaries were closed."

On the evening of 7 January 1978, seminary students in Qom made copies of the article, with an addendum stating that a meeting was to be held the next day at the Khan Seminary to protest the contents of the article. The same night, during phone conversations and private talks with seminary professors, academics, and students, it was decided to close the seminary and classrooms.

=== 8 January ===
On 8 January, seminaries and some shops were closed. Students who had halted classes gathered outside the Khan Seminary and marched to the houses of religious leaders, chanting slogans in favor of Imam Khomeini along the way. The crowd chanted "Death to this Yazidi regime", "Peace be upon Khomeini", and "Our leader is Khomeini" as they marched to the Feyziyeh School in Astana Square, where security forces attempted to disperse the gathering. However, when the gathering dispersed, it was suggested among the protesters that they proceed to Ayatollah Golpaygani's residence.

=== 9 January ===
The bazaar was closed in Qom on 9 January. On this day, according to the previous arrangements, the students gathered in front of the Khan Seminary and Astana Square, and proceeded from there to the houses of religious leaders, much like the previous day. When more people had gathered in Astana Square in the afternoon, the crowd moved towards the house of Noori, and gradually, due to the decrease in fear and panic, more people from different social classes joined the demonstration. Several thousand Khomeini followers protested on this day. At the Eram intersection and the museum's three-way intersection in Qom, the police and commandos were ready and waiting. Nouri addressed the audience and urged unity while defending Imam Khomeini and the student movement. Following the speech, the crowd once again began to march, but the police stopped them as they approached Safaieh Street. The demonstrations turned violent when someone threw stones, breaking the window of a nearby bank, which resulted in the security forces using live ammunition on the crowd.

=== Toll ===
Between 5 and 300 of the demonstrating people were consequently killed by the Shah's security forces in the protest. According to Hossein Bashiriyeh, the peaceful demonstration by the religious students was cracked down on by police, leading to the death of between 40 and 200 people. A report by the CIA's National Foreign Assessment Center stated that the death toll was greater than what was stated in the government's reports.

== Aftermath ==
Religious and secular opposition organizations were galvanized into action against the Shah in response to the article and the violent persecution of Khomeini's supporters. High-ranking scholars in Qom released a statement describing the Shah's government as "anti-Islamic and illegitimate" and announced public mourning for the dead. Consequently, news of the incident spread throughout Iran and quickly became a landmark event, triggering a revolutionary mobilization. "The Society of Merchants and Guild of Tehran Bazaar, the Isfahani and Tabarizi bazaaris in Tehran, the National Front, the Toiler's party," and the Left all expressed opposition to the regime's violent behavior. The Tehran Bazaar went on strike on 12 January. On 17 and 18 February, additional demonstrations and conflicts with police occurred. The most intense conflicts occurred in Tabriz on 27 and 28 March and 7 and 8 May. In May, the scale of the demonstrations in Tehran prompted the government to deploy tanks on the streets. On 10 and 11 August, similar events to those in Tabriz took place in Isfahan.

== See also ==
- 1978 Tabriz protests
