= 1925 in Iran =

- Decades
- See also: Other events of 1925; Years in Iran

The following lists events that have happened in 1925 in the Qajar dynasty.

== Incumbents ==
- Shah: Ahmad Shah Qajar (until December 15), Reza Shah (starting December 15)
- Prime Minister: Reza Shah (until December 15), Mohammad-Ali Foroughi (starting December 15)

== Births ==
- ? - Ibrahim al-Musawi al-Zanjani, Islamic scholar and writer.

== Deaths ==
- April 5 – Mohammad Ali Shah Qajar died in Sanremo, Italy.
