= 1978 Tabriz protests =

Event in the leadup of the Iranian Revolution

- Part of Iranian Revolution
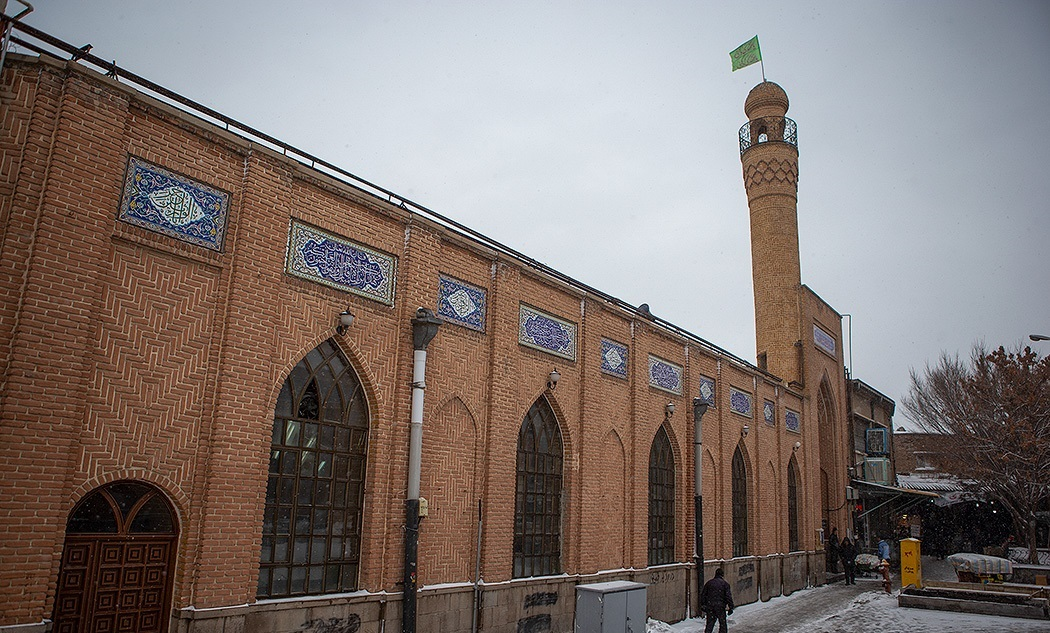
- Date: 18 and 19 February 1978
- Location: Tabriz, Iran
- Caused by: The 40th day commemoration for the people killed during the 1978 Qom protest
- Methods: Demonstration
- Result: Countrywide demonstrations and strikes finally leading to the Iranian Revolution

Casualties
- Deaths: 14, 27
- Injuries: 125, 262

1978 Tabriz protests refers to the events that occurred on 18 February 1978, 40 days after the 1978 Qom protest. Several clerics in Qom and other major cities across Iran had announced the 40th-day commemoration for those killed during the Qom incidents. Also, announcements were published in universities a few days before the 40th-day commemoration of the events in Qom, inviting students and professors to close the university and join the demonstrators. The most prominent of the developments occurred in Tabriz.

On the announced day, 18 February 1978, a large crowd was led by Ayatollah Seyyed Mohammad Ali Qazi Tabataba'ei towards the Qezelli mosque, which was closed by the police to prevent the 40th-day commemoration from being held. The clash over the mosque closure, between police and the people, led to the death of a young student protester, Mohammad Tajalli, whose body was then taken to the streets. People attacked wine stores and cinemas and set fire to the Rastakhiz Party headquarters. As a result, at least 14 people were killed and 125 others injured.

== Prelude ==
=== Announcements ===
Given the large number of people killed during the 1978 Qom incident, several clerics in Qom and several other major cities across Iran announced the 40th-day commemoration, the most prominent of which was Tabriz.

Ayatollah Golpayegani and Marashi issued notices on 14 and 15 February 1978 and called for the formation of 40th day anniversary of Qom "martyrs." Seyyed Mohammad Sadegh Hosseini Rouhani also gave messages and declared Saturday, the 10th of Rabi al-Awwal, the 40th day anniversary of the martyrs of Qom, as a day of public mourning. Also, on 14 February 1978, Ayatollah Shariatmadari issued a statement regarding the 40th anniversary. Ayatollah Seyyed Mohammad Ali Qazi Tabataba'ei was the most prominent pro-Khomeini cleric in Tabriz. The organization, management, and leadership of various communities in the street and market were also formed by Ayatollah Qazi from mosques such as Sha'ban, Maghbara, Qezelli and Seyyed Hamza. Sha'ban mosque was the "nerve center of religious opposition in the city," after the Qom incidents.

Several announcements were published in universities a few days before the 40th day anniversary of the events in Qom, inviting students and professors to close the university and join the demonstrators. The protesters managed to close many classes, although SAVAK was very sensitive to universities and had a subtle influence among university students and professors.

=== Regime preparations ===
The governor of Azerbaijan province at that time was Lt. Gen. Eskandar Azmoudeh, a relative of the prime minister at that time, Jamshid Amoozgar. He was one of the influential people in the U.S.- and UK-instigated 1953 Iranian coup d'état. Azmoudeh was responsible for coordinating and dealing with any possible incidents in the province for the upcoming events and was on a trip to Dasht-e Moghan one day before the 1978 Tabriz uprising. Upon learning the current situation and the plan of the clergy to perform 40th day anniversary ceremony for the Qom martyrs in Mirza Yusuf Mojtahedi Mosque, Azmoudeh consulted with the Army General Nematollah Nasiri, the head of SAVAK about this, and Nasiri replied that: "There is nothing wrong with the ceremony being held in mosques, but street demonstrations should be properly prevented."

== The events ==
Almost 40,000 people participated the 1978 Tabriz uprising. Local police forces in Tabriz refused to open fire against the demonstrators, which made the Mohammad Reza Pahlavi call on military forces from outside Azerbaijan provinces. For the first time since 1963, the army troops were deployed in the streets to "restore order," an operation which was conducted "quick and successful." The regime's response to the uprising in Tabriz in February 1978 is described as being "massive repression" which included arrests. According to Sepehr Zabir, although the February 1978 uprising in Tabriz was effectively "crushed", the security forces, who were unfamiliar with guerrilla warfare, were not able to exterminate the resistance because there was no defined policy against insurrection.

=== 18 February ===
On 18 February 1978, the 40th day, the markets were closed in many parts of the country, ceremonies were held in mosques and mosques, and magnificent gatherings were held in the Grand Mosque of Qom in the morning and evening. Factories, bazaars, and schools participated in the demonstrations in a strike that paralyzed the city. "Death to Shah" slogan was heard for the first time during the 1978 Tabriz demonstrations. The 18 February developments in Tabriz were extensive. On this day, Ayatollah Qazi led a large group of people towards the Qezelli mosque which is located at the beginning of Tabriz's bazaar. The mosque is also known as Haj Mirza Yusuf Agha Mojtahed mosque.

The protesters unleashed their rage when a young student protester, called Mohammad Tajalli, was killed in Tabriz. Ayatollah Mohsen Mojtahed Shabestri, in his memoirs, portrays the 19 February developments that the mosque was closed down by Tabriz police, preventing the 40th-anniversary ceremony from taking place. Colonel Haghshenas, the chief of police, was directly there and in charge of the situation. Meanwhile, Mohammad Tajalli approached Colonel Haghshenas and asked why the police had closed the mosque. Colonel Haqshanas insulted by calling the mosque a "barn" in response. "The barn door must be closed," he replied. Upon hearing this response, the unarmed young guy rushed Colonel Haghshenas and attempted to fight him, but the colonel killed him with his handgun. People carried Mohammad Tajalli's body to the street, where a large demonstration began, with the number of participants growing. Because of the increased population, the roads were blocked, and people attacked wine stores and cinemas, as well as setting fire to the Rastakhiz Party headquarters. In the battle with Shah's security forces, thirteen more people were killed, and the city was shut down. As soon as the news of the rebellion in Tabriz reached Tehran, the chief of police and the governor of Azerbaijan were replaced.

=== 19 February ===
On February 19, 1978, street fighting broke out in Tabriz, lasting over 12 hours. According to the government, nine people were killed.

=== Toll ===
Hundreds were killed or injured as a result of the security forces' operation. According to subsequent inquests, the February incidents in Tabriz left 14 dead and 125 others injured, although other sources give an alternative toll of 27 killed and 262 injured.

== Aftermath ==
Tabriz incident marked "the first well-planned and efficient defiance" of the Pahlavi regime, and increased the confrontation level with the regime. The 40th anniversary of the "Tabriz massacre" was commemorated in different cities. Mohammad Reza Shah ordered a "top-level investigation team" to Tabriz.
