= Mansour (singer) =

Mansour منصور جعفری مَمَقانی
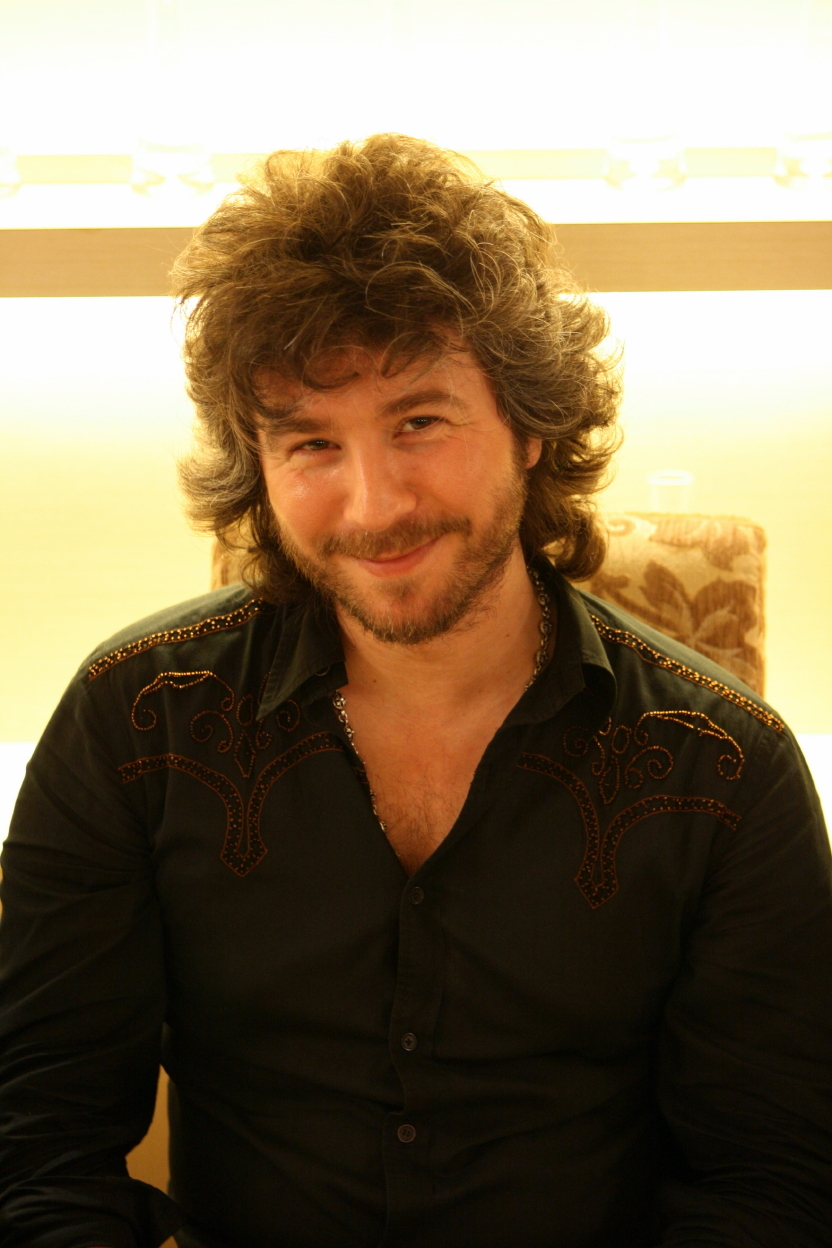
- Mansour before a concert in 2009

Background information
- Born: Mansour Jafari Mamaghaani; 28 July 1971 (age 55); Miyandoab, Iran
- Genres: Pop; Dance; Disco
- Occupations: Singer, actor, fashion designer
- Instruments: Vocals, percussion, keyboards, synthesizer, guitar
- Years active: 1991–present
- Labels: Taraneh Records; Caltex Records; MZM Records; Century Records USA; Avang Music; SOHO entertainment MansourMusic
- Website: https://instagram.com/mansourmusic https://www.mansourmusic.com

Mansour Jafari Mamaghani (Persian: منصور جعفری مَمَقانی, born 28 July 1971), better known as Mansour, is an Iranian musical artist specializing in Iranian traditional music based in Southern California.

== Iran's Green Movement and Nokia Club controversy 2009 ==
After the Iranian presidential election in June 2009 and protests against its results, Mansour recorded a song titled "Nedaye Eshgh". The word "Neda" in the title of this song was used as a symbolic meaning of "calling" for freedom and hope, and also it was the first name of one of the assassinated people in these protests: Neda Agha-Soltan. Mansour also participated in some of the protests that were held in Los Angeles, California.

Despite his involvement in these causes, when Mansour began promotions for his concert at Club Nokia in Los Angeles on 26 September 2009, many people criticized his decision to perform at a place with the name of the Nokia Company, which had sold monitoring technology devices to Iran's government after protests against election outcomes. Mansour reacted against this criticism, saying, "Nokia Club is owned by AEG Company and had nothing to do with Nokia" and "the people who started these rumors should respect these holy activities [protests] in Iran and stop playing games with people's emotions." Despite this comments, Club Nokia is actually owned by both AEG and Nokia, but the planning for the concert was done months before the Iran's Green Movements and Nokia's part against the protesters. Nokia was not the sponsor of Mansour's concert; the program was presented by Century Records and Goldenvoice Company.

== Discography ==
=== Studio albums ===
With Taraneh Records

- 1996: Tasvir Akhar
- 1997: Daricheh
- 2001: Zendegi (Life)
- 2002: Divooneh (Crazy)
- 2005: Farari (Fugitive)
- 2007: Ghashangeh (Beautiful)

With Caltex Records

- 1994: Ferferehayeh Bibaad
- 1998: Ghayegh Kaghazi
- 2000: Faghat Bekhatareh To (Only For You)

With Century Records USA

- 2009: Janjaali

With Avang Music

- 2013: No Limit

With SOHO Entertainment

- 2017: Radical
- 2019: Ensane Nou
- 2023: Miras

Singles

- 2009: Nedaye Eshgh
- 2010: Mikhaam Bahat Beraghsam
- 2010: Zendegi Chist
- 2011: Bari Bakh
- 2011: Beshkan
- 2012: Eshgh Nemikhabeh
- 2012: Man Bahat Jooram
- 2013: Naz Maka
- 2013: Delam Khoshe
- 2017: Khoshbakhti
- 2017: Delshooreha
- 2017: Ay Eshgham
- 2022: Miras
- 2023: Lalaei
- 2023: Ma Ghahremanim
- 2023: Sobhe Azadi
- 2023: Tazeh Kojasho Didi

=== Live albums ===
With MZM Records

- 1996: Mansour Live in Concert
- 2010: Mansour Live in Concert Club Nokia (Audio CD)

=== DVDs/music videos ===
- 2001: Life ... On The Road DVD (music videos Of "Zendegi" album)
- 2005: Farari DVD (music videos Of "Divooneh" and some music videos from "Farari", include In "Farari" Album Package)
- 2007: Only For You DVD (music videos of "Faghat Be Khatereh To" album)
- 2010: Mansour Live in Concert Club Nokia DVD (includes videos of songs performed at club nokia concert)

=== Guest appearances ===
- Black Cats (Featuring Mansour) – Gole Yakh (remake of Persian famous song with the same name, the original singer Is Kourosh Yaghmaei).
- Mahasti and Hayedeh (Featuring Mansour) – Vedaa (Shab-e Eshgh) (remake of song by Hayedeh and her sister Mahasti. She sings this song in the memory of her late sister, after her death. In this song Mansour just sang in the choruses, Mansour's part in original song was performed by Persian pop legend Ebi).

== Filmography ==
- 2001: America So Beautiful
