= Muhammad Hasan Ashtiyani =

Muhammad Hasan Ashtiyani (c. 1832 – 1901) was an Iranian Shia mujtahid, jurist, and man of hadith. He was involved at the Tobacco protest against the Tobacco Régie in 1891.

== Biography ==
Muhammad Hasan Ashtiyani was born in 1832 in Ashtiyan, in Markazi province, Iran. His father died when he was at age of 3. His mother hired a private teacher to educate him, from whom he learned basic education such as writing and reading the Quran. He became fascinated by theology and traveled to Boroujerd to study in a seminary. At the time, the seminary of Boroujerd was considered among the best. He learned Arabic literature and jurisprudence. At the same time, he participated in Sayyed Shafi Japalqi's courses who taught the religious teachings of Shia. Following his time in the seminary, Ashtiyani traveled to Najaf and became one of the special pupils of Shaykh Ansari. When he come back to Tehran he was a pioneer in teaching the innovations and points of his Master Shaykh Ansari. He also tried to develop the style of Ansari's school among men of religious sciences.

== Political and social activity ==
He was also active in social and political affairs, having had a large role in the Tobacco Protest. He didn't accept the gifts and diamonds of the Shah and defended the rights of victims of the sanctions on tobacco. He strongly supported Shirazi's fatwa and the repudiation of the concession.

== Family ==
He had four sons and one daughter.

- Murtaza Ashtiyani
- Hashem Ashtiyani
- Iftekhar Al Olama (also known as Sahba)
- Mirza Ahmad Ashtiyani, known as Valeh and considered as an eminent philosopher of philosophical school of Tehran.
- Fatima, who was the mother of Mirza Mehdi Ashtiyani, a well-known philosopher.

== Works ==
- Bahr Al Favaed
- Rasalah fi Al Ajza
- Mabahis Al Alfaz
- Kitab Al Qaza va Shahadat
- Kitab Al Ijarah
- Kitab Al Vaghf

== Pupils ==
He had many pupils who would go on to be well known in their own right. They include:

- Mirza Muhammad Ali Shah Abadi
- Hosein Qomi
- Sayyed Nasrolla Akhavi
- Allameh Qazvini
- Mirza Masin Alighani
- Ali Akbar Hikmi
- Mirza Muhammad Javad Nahavandi
- Muhammad Musavi Behbahani

== Death ==
Ashtiyani died in 1901 at the age of 71. He died in Abdul Azim Hasani. His corpse was later transferred to Najaf.

== See also ==
- Tobacco Protest
- Mirza Mohammed Hassan Husseini Shirazi
