= Rafat Hashempour =

Iranian voice actress (1931–2022)

- Born: 30 October 1931, Ardabil
- Died: 25 February 2022, Karaj
- Occupation: Voice acting
- Years active: 1958–2000
- Known for: Doubler of famous actresses of world cinema
- Spouse: Jalal Maghami

Rafat Hashempour (Persian: رفعت هاشم‌پور; October 30,1931– February 25, 2022) was an Iranian voice actress. She entered the field of dubbing in 1958 and worked on both foreign and Iranian films.

== Filmography ==
=== Dubbing work ===
Role	Film	Year	Ref
Scarlett	Gone with the Wind	1939	
Barbara Graham	I Want to Live	1958	
Anne Sullivan	The Miracle Worker	1962	
Judy Barton / Madeleine Elster	Vertigo	1958	
Sheba	Solomon and Sheba	1959	
Ella Garth	Wild River	1960	
Baroness Elsa von Schraeder	The Sound of Music	1965	
Holly Parker Anderson	Madame X	1966	
Greta Ohlsson	Murder on the Orient Express	1974	
Nurse Mildred Ratched	One Flew Over the Cuckoo's Nest	1975	
Hind	The Message	1976	

== Later life ==
From the late 1990s onwards, Rafat Hashempour rarely spoke. She died on 25 February 2022, due to old age in Karaj. Jalal Maghami was her husband.
