= Turan Bahrami Shahriari =

Iranian lawyer and poet

Turan Bahraimi Shahriari
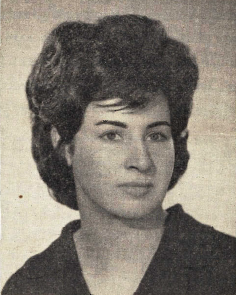
- Turan Bahrami Shahriari in 1965
- Born: November 5, 1931, Kerman, Iran
- Died: June 19, 2024, Tehran, Iran
- Occupation: Poet and lawyer

Turan Bahrami Shahriari (1931-2024), also known as Tooran Bahrami Shahriari, was an Iranian poet and lawyer. She was Zoroastrian, and the first woman of a religious minority to be on the board of the Iranian Bar Association. She got her BA in law from Tehran University, receiving her lawyers license from the Iranian Bar Association in 1963, making her the 6th Iranian woman to have one.

== Awards, publications, and poetry ==
Turan Bahrami Shahriari wrote many poems about Iran and its ancient history. Her poems have been published in FEZANA, Iranian.com, and in multiple books, including one by the Iranian embassy in India, and two books of her own.

One of her poems included Indira Gandhi, the first woman Prime Minister of India, which her son Rajiv Gandhi acknowledged and which was published in a book by the Iranian embassy in India. In 1999, the Center for Women’s Partnership and Participation, Tehran, Iran, published a list under the auspices of the Office of the President of Iran of 60 outstanding women of Iran, counting her among them. Of this list, she is the only one of a religious minority.

== Law career ==
When she got her Bar licence in 1963, she was the only Zoroastrian woman practicing law at the time. She held multiple government legal posts, which she was forced out of after the Iranian Revolution. She was selected as a representative of Iran at multiple events, including the First Persian Cultural Festival in Sydney, Australia in 1994, and to accompany the President of Tajikistan's entourage at the fourth gathering of Tajikis at the Unity Palace in Dushanbe In 1999.

== Personal life ==
Shahriari was born into a Zoroastrian community in Kerman, where her grandfather was a prominent member of the religious community and her father was a merchant. She began writing poetry at the age of 12, publishing poetry in Iranian literary magazines from 1953 onward, later publishing in the United States, England, France, and Tajikistan.
