= Amir Reza Salari =

Iranian cinematographer and director (born 1977)

- امیررضا سالاری
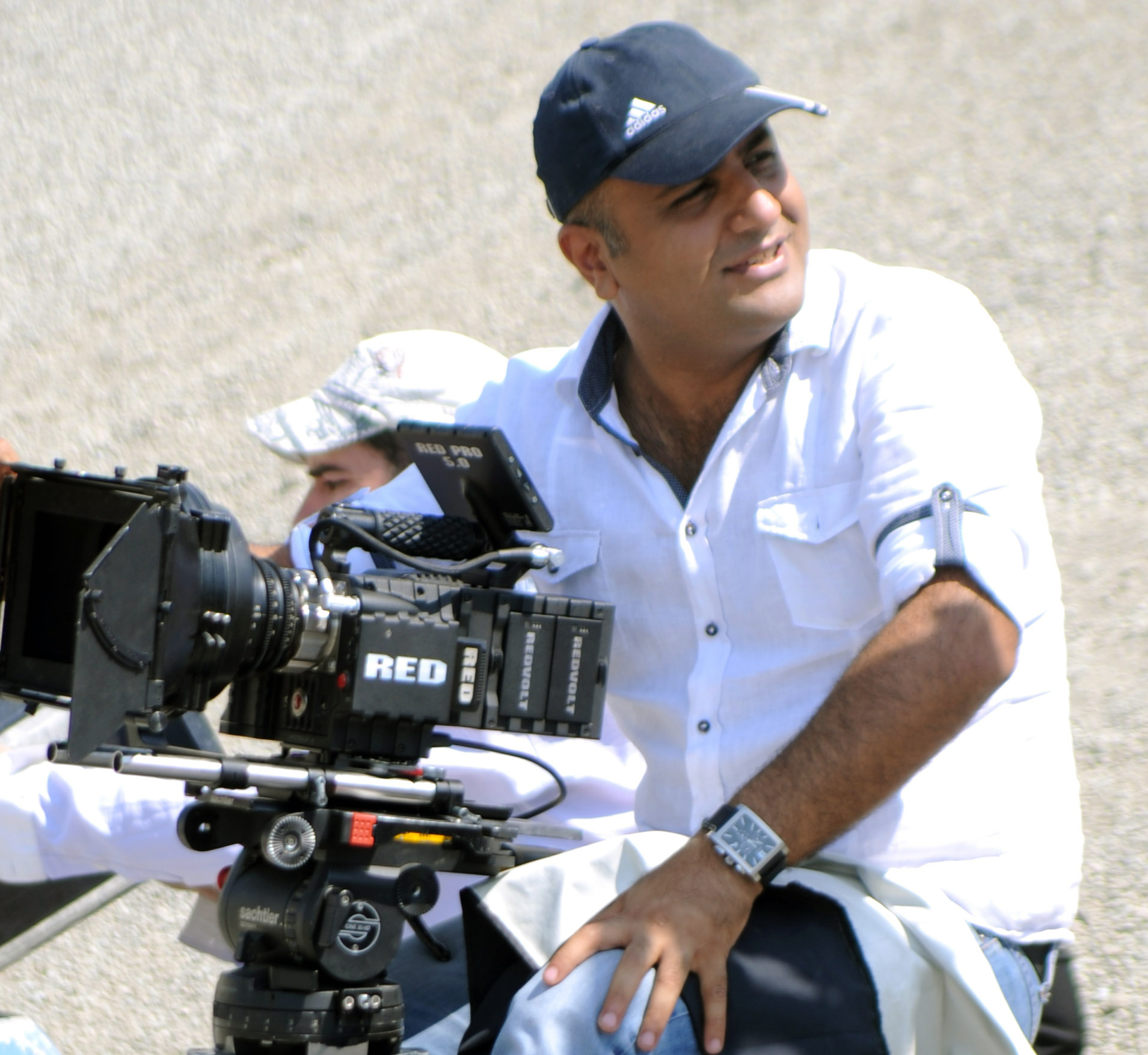
- Salari during shooting in Tehran in 2018
- Born: Amirreza Salari; 1977 (age 48–49); Kermanshah, Iran
- Occupations: Film director, cinematographer
- Years active: 1998–present
- Website: www.amirrezasalari.com

Amir Reza Salari (Persian: امیر رضا سالاری; born 23 September 1977, Kermanshah) is an Iranian cinematographer and director.

== Biography ==
Born in Kermanshah, Salari grew up in Tehran and studied graphic designing and visual arts at the University of Tehran. He has worked with Abbas Kiarostami and Bahram Beyzaei as editor.

In September 2017, he directed and produced “30 Birds of Peace” under the auspices of UNESCO to celebrate the International Peace Day. The event was attended by governmental officials, foreign diplomats, representatives of UN agencies and NGOs, renowned Iranian artists and the general public.

Salari is currently working on his new movie which is an Iranian adaptation of Henrik Ibsen's An Enemy of the People.
