= Mohammad-Ali Eslami Nodooshan =

Iranian literary critic (1924–2022)

Mohammad-Ali Eslami Nodushan
- محمدعلی اسلامی ندوشن
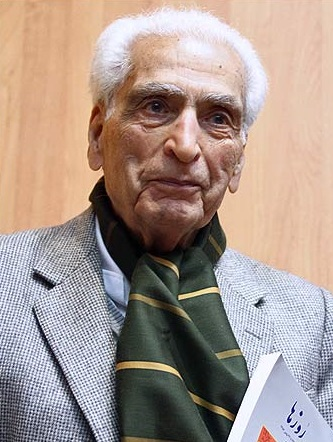
- Nodushan in 2012
- Born: 25 August 1924; Nadushan, Yazd, Iran
- Died: 25 April 2022 (aged 97); Toronto, Canada
- Education: University of Tehran; Sorbonne University
- Occupations: Poet; Translator
- Years active: 1955–2022
- Spouse: Shirin Bayani
- Children: 2

Mohammad-Ali Eslami Nodushan (Persian: محمدعلی اسلامی ندوشن; 25 August 1924 – 25 April 2022) was an Iranian literary critic, translator and poet, and one of the most celebrated contemporary writers on culture and literature in Iran.

== Life ==
After graduating from high school in Yazd and receiving his BS in Law in Tehran, he set off for France to continue his legal studies and to take his MS and PhD. Afterwards, he returned to Iran and began teaching Literature and Law at the University of Tehran. From 1348 (1969) until two years after the Iran's Revolution in 1978, he taught legal courses and comparative literature at the faculties of Law and Literature of Tehran University. He was founder of Hasti magazine and at the same time he wrote some articles in many of Iranian literary magazines such as Negin, Sokhan and Yaghma. In two last decades of his life, Nodushan was a journalist of Ettelaat newspaper and International Information newspaper, which were published simultaneously in London and Los Angeles.

Nodushan was one of the most prolific contemporary writers and researchers, who was an author books, translator with more than 70 works, in Iranian literature and culture, and also hundreds of articles in this area.

== Work ==
Nodushan was the author of about 70 books on culture, society and literature. His versatile writings often reach over themes from "Morality and Literature" to "Dialogue Among Civilizations".

His works include:

- Don't we forget Iran (ايران را از ياد نبريم)
- Good traits of Human Rights in South countries, a reassessment (ذکر مناقب حقوق بشر در جهان سوم)
- The Stories’ Story, On Rostam and Isfandiar in Shahnameh (داستان داستان‌ها، رستم و اسفندیار در شاهنامه)
- Life, élan and decease of the chivalrous in Shahnameh (زندگی و مرگ پهلوانان در شاهنامه)

He gave lectures at 40 universities in over 20 countries, including Canada, all are published in both English and French. He published his autobiography, an unorthodox event in Persian writing. It is also believed that Nadooshan's travel accounts brought this genre back to life in Persian literature, namely his "Siren of Phoenix"—logs of journeys to various countries—and "Liberty of Statue"—from travels to the United States.

He remained active after his retirement from academic life, and founded the Ferdowsi cultural centre (Farhangsara-ye-Ferdosi) and the quarterly "Hasti" (Universe, Being) (1993).
