= Jalal Sattari =

Iranian writer (1931–2021)

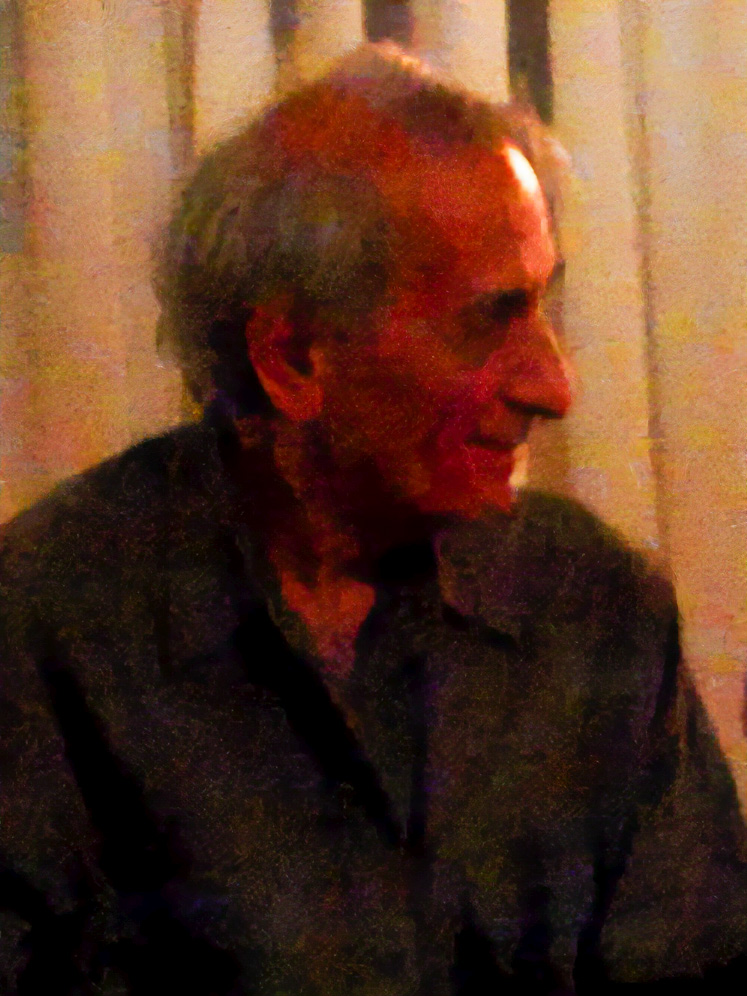
Jalal Sattari

Jalal Sattari (6 August 1931 – 31 July 2021) was an Iranologist, mythologist, writer and translator. He undertook his university studies in Switzerland where he also got his PhD degree. Swiss psychologist Jean Piaget was amongst his supervisors. Jalal Sattari wrote some 71 books on anthropology, mythology, and psychology.

== Honours and awards ==
- Sattari was a member of the French National Order of the Legion of Honor for his dedication to cause of the culture during his 50-year career as cultural activist.
- Order of Arts and Letters (Ordre des Arts et des Lettres) by the French Culture Ministry, 2005
- Davud Rashidi Award, 2018.
- The Jalal Sattari Awards established in 2011 was named after him. The prize was created to recognize researchers of many nationalities who have worked to promote ritual and folk arts performances.
- The book Sociology of Theater by Jean Duvignaud which he translated won The Book of the Year Award in 2015. According to IBNA, the book was nominated for the Performing Arts Award in the 32nd edition of the Book of the Year, but Sattari was unable to attend the ceremony held last week at the Organization of Islamic Conference Summit Hall in Tehran owing to age-related issues.

== Death ==
- Sattari died on 31 July 2021, at age 89.

== See also ==
- Iranistics
