= Qaani =

Iranian poet (1808–1854)

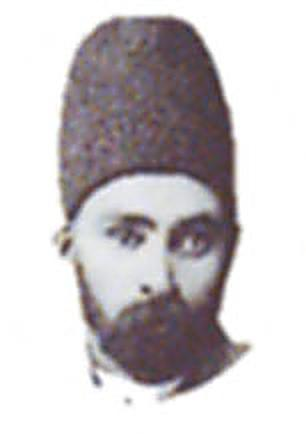
Image of Qaani.

Mirza Habibollah Shirazi (Persian: میرزا حبیب‌الله شیرازی), known by the pen name Qa'ani (20 October 1808 – 4 May 1854; Persian: قاآنی), was one of the most famous poets of the Qajar era.

== Biography ==
Habibollah Shirazi was born on 20 October 1808 in Shiraz, where he attended elementary school. His father, Mirza Mohammad Ali, was a minor poet who wrote under the pen name Golshan. He lost his father at the age of eleven, after which he enjoyed the patronage of Hasan Ali Mirza Shuja' al-Saltana, the governor of Shiraz, who gave him the pen name Qaani. At an early age, Qaani went to Mashhad for further study. He wrote a poem to praise Fath Ali Shah Qajar during the former's visit to Tehran, and called him "Mojtahed of the Poets".

He studied Arabic and Persian literature and had great interest in hekmat. He was familiar with French and English and was knowledgeable in mathematics and rhetoric. He was considered a master of logic.

He died in 1854 in Rey.

== Work ==
The most complete versions of Qaani's diwan (collection of poetry) consists of over 20,000 verses. This may make up only a fifth of his total oeuvre, the remainder having been lost (Qaani was not meticulous about preserving his writings). He wrote a book named Parishan, in the style of Sa'di's Golestan. He is best known for his numerous qasidas, but he also wrote musammats, tarji-bands, ghazals, matnawis, qit'as, and ruba'is.
