= 1926 in Iran =

- Decades
- See also: Other events of 1926; Years in Iran

The following lists events that happened in 1926 in the Imperial State of Persia.

== Incumbents ==
- Shah: Reza Shah
- Prime Minister: Mohammad-Ali Foroughi (until June 13), Mostowfi ol-Mamalek (starting June 13)

== Events ==
- April 25 – Rezā Khan was crowned Shah of Persia under the name "Pahlevi".

== Births ==
- October 15 – Reza Seyed-Hosseini, translator of French language literature
