= 1997–98 Iranian Basketball League Division One =

The following is the final results of the Iran Division One 1997/1998 basketball season.

== Participated teams ==
=== Group A ===
- ABFA Shiraz
- Dokhaniat Urmia
- Fath Tehran
- Foolad Mobarakeh Isfahan
- Saina Kordestan
- Sanat Naft Ahvaz
- Zob Ahan Isfahan
- Zoghalsang Kerman*

* Zoghalsang withdrew during the season.

=== Group B ===
- Fajr Gorgan
- Foolad Neishabour
- Moghavemat Basij Shahrekord
- Paykan Tehran
- Petrochimi Bandar Imam
- Rah Ahan Tehran
- Sinjergaz Khorramabad
- Tarbiat Badani Khorasan

The top 8 teams qualified for the 1st edition of Iran Super League.

== Final standing ==
1. Paykan Tehran
2. Zob Ahan Isfahan
3. Fath Tehran
4. Rah Ahan Tehran
