= 1898 in Iran =

- Decades
- See also: Other events of 1898; Years in Iran

The following lists events that have happened in 1898 in the Qajar era, Iran.

== Incumbents ==
- Monarch: Mozaffar al-Din Shah Qajar

== Birth ==
- January 21 – Ahmad Shah Qajar, the last Shah of the Qajar dynasty, was born in Tabriz (d. 1930 in France)
