= Arsalan Pouria =

Iranian poet

Arsalan Pouria (Persian: ارسلان پوریا) (1930-4 June 1994) was an Iranian poet and playwright who believed in archaism. He thought that Iranian old ideas and traditions are so important in constructing modern Iran. He has a special interest in old Iranian mythology and epics. In his works, he used Iranian old poet, Ferdowsi’s idea. But he didn’t use Ferdowsi’s poems exactly. Instead of that, he used stories in Shahnameh, and made new poems based on those stories. One of his important works was “Bahram’s weapon”. This work is about the battle between Iranians and Turanians. In this battle, Iran is defeated and Bahram keep fighting for returning the crown back. But between these struggles, He loses his weapon.

== Selected works ==
- The tragedy of Afshin (1957)
- The tragedy of Cambyses (1958)
- Arash the bowman (1959)
- The song of freedom (1960)
- Bahram's weapon (1969)
