= 1927 in Iran =

- Decades
- See also: Other events of 1927; Years in Iran

The following lists events that happened in 1927 in the Imperial State of Persia.

== Incumbents ==
- Shah: Reza Shah
- Prime Minister: Mostowfi ol-Mamalek (until June 2), Mehdi Qoli Hedayat (starting June 2)

== Births ==
- 16 July – Hushang Ansary, diplomat and businessman (died 2026 in the United States)
- 20 July – Simin Behbahani, poet (died 2014)
- date unknown – Bijan Jalali, poet (died 2000)

== Deaths ==
- December 26 – Abolqasem Naser ol-Molk, 5th Prime Minister of Iran and former Regent (born 1856)
