= 1848 in Iran =

- Decades
- See also: Other events of 1848; Years in Iran

The following lists events that have happened in 1848 in the Qajar era.

== Incumbents ==
- Monarch: Mohammad Shah Qajar (until September 5), Naser al-Din Shah Qajar (starting September 5)

== Events ==
- September 5 – Nasser al-Din Shah Qajar ascends to throne.

== Death ==
- September 5 – Mohammad Shah Qajar dies in Tehran, Iran.
