= 1872 in Iran =

- Decades
- See also: Other events of 1872; Years in Iran

The following lists events that have happened in 1872 in Iran.

== Incumbents ==
- Monarch: Naser al-Din Shah Qajar

== Births ==
- June 21 – Mohammad Ali Shah Qajar is born in Tabriz.
