= 1896 in Iran =

- Decades
- See also: Other events of 1896; Years in Iran

The following lists events that have happened in 1896 in the Qajar era.

== Incumbents ==
- Monarch: Naser al-Din Shah Qajar (until May 1), Mozaffar al-Din Shah Qajar (starting May 1)

== Events ==
- Mozaffar ad-Din Shah Qajar ascends to the throne in May 1896 after the assassination of Naser al-Din Shah.

== Death ==
- May 1 – Naser al-Din Shah Qajar is assassinated by Mirza Reza Kermani while visiting and praying at Shah Abdol-Azim Shrine.
