= 1928 in Iran =

- Decades
- See also: Other events of 1928; Years in Iran

The following lists events that happened in 1928 in the Imperial State of Persia.

== Incumbents ==
- Shah: Reza Shah
- Prime Minister: Mehdi Qoli Hedayat

== Births ==
- January 14 – Ali Akbar Moinfar, politician (died 2018)
- August 20 – Amou Haji, a man known for not bathing for over 60 years (died 2022)
