= Negin Dadkhah =

Iranian national speed skater

Negin Dadkhah (Persian: نگین دادخواه) (born 23 November 1990) is an Iranian national speed skater.

== Background ==
=== Competitions ===
Negin is currently training with The Powerslide Team in Iran.
