= Dakhil Maraghai =

19th century Azerbaijani poet

- Born: Akhund Molla Hussein Dakhil; 19th century Maragheh, Qajar Iran
- Died: 19th century Maragheh, Qajar Iran
- Occupation: Poet
- Writing career
- Language: Azerbaijani
- Period: 19th century

Dakhil Maraghai (Azerbaijani: حوسئین دخیل ماراغایی) was a 19th-century poet who wrote in Azerbaijani.

== Life ==
Hussein Dakhil was born in the 19th century in the city of Maragha and lived there all his life. He is one of the akhunds of his time.

== Poetry ==
Dahil Maragai mainly wrote works on the topic of the Battle of Karbala and the tragic death of Imam Husayn, as well as other significant figures for Shiites (Ali ibn Abi Talib, Zeynab bint Ali). He published a seven-volume set on the tragedy in Karbala. The poet's divan was printed several times in Tabriz. Dahil's book is particularly important for those who read marsiya. The poet's extraordinary abilities and skill in prose writing similar to Fuzuli are also known.
