= Emam Gholi Khan Haji Ilkhani =

Great Ilkhan of the Bakhtiari tribe (1825–1899)

Emam Gholi Khan
- The great ilkhan
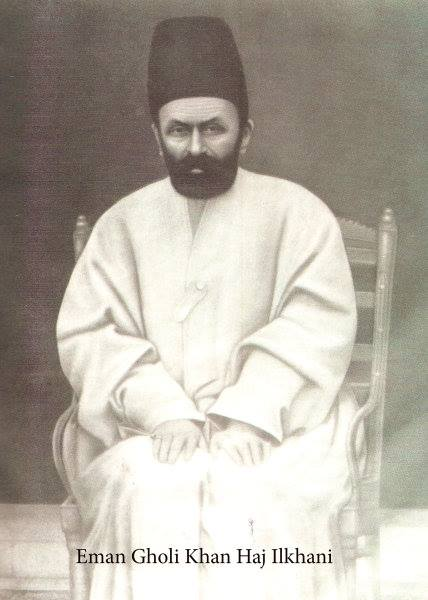
- The great ilkhan of bakhtiari
- Born: Tehran, Iran
- Issue: Hossein Gholi Khan; LotfAli Khan Amir Mofakham; Nasir Khan Sardar Jang
Names
- Emam Gholi Khan Haji Ilkhani
- House: House of Bakhtiari Family
- Father: Jafar Gholi khan
- Mother: bibi Shah pasand

Emam Gholi Khan Haji Ilkhani (1825 Tehran – 1899 Ardal) was the great ilkhan of Bakhtiari tribe. He was second son of Jafar Gholi Khan Doraki and Bibi Shah Pasand. After killing his older brother, Hossein Gholi Khan ilkhani The great ilkhan of Bakhtiari tribe in isphahan He became The great ilkhan in Ardal, Iran. On 1899 The great ilkhan of Bakhtiari tribe death at Bakhtiari's government Center Ardal's Castle.
