= 1831 in Iran =

- Decades
- See also: Other events of 1831; Years in Iran

The following lists events that happened in 1831 in the Qajar dynasty.

== Incumbents ==
- Monarch: Fat′h-Ali Shah Qajar

== Birth ==
- July 16 – Naser al-Din Shah Qajar born in Tabriz
