= 1834 in Iran =

- Decades
- See also: Other events of 1834; Years in Iran

The following lists events that have happened in 1834 in the Qajar dynasty, Iran.

== Incumbents ==
- Monarch: Fat′h-Ali Shah Qajar (until October 24), Mohammad Shah Qajar (starting October 24)

== Events ==
- October 24 – Mohammad Shah Qajar ascends to the throne after the death of Fat′h-Ali Shah Qajar.

== Death ==
- October 24 – Fath-Ali Shah Qajar, the second king of Qajar dynasty, dies in Isfahan at the age of 62.
