= 1853 in Iran =

- Decades
- See also: Other events of 1853; Years in Iran

The following lists events that have happened in 1853 in the Qajar dynasty.

== Incumbents ==
- Monarch: Naser al-Din Shah Qajar

== Births ==
- March 23 – Mozaffar ad-Din Shah Qajar was born in Tehran

== Events ==
- May 5 – The Shiraz earthquake shook the region with a maximum Mercalli intensity of IX (Violent), leaving 13,000 dead.
