= 1826 in Iran =

- Decades
- See also: Other events of 1826; Years in Iran

The following lists events that have happened in 1826 in the Sublime State of Persia.

== Incumbents ==
- Monarch: Fat′h-Ali Shah Qajar

== Events ==
- Russo-Persian War (1826–28) started.
