= 1828 in Iran =

- Decades
- See also: Other events of 1828; Years in Iran

The following lists events that have happened in 1828 in the Sublime State of Persia.

== Incumbents ==
- Monarch: Fat′h-Ali Shah Qajar

== Events ==
- Russo-Persian War (1826–28) finished.
- February 10 – Treaty of Turkmenchay was signed between Persia and Russia.
