= 1833 in Iran =

- Decades
- See also: Other events of 1833; Years in Iran

The following lists events that have happened in 1833 in the Qajar dynasty, Iran.

== Incumbents ==
- Monarch: Fat′h-Ali Shah Qajar

== Death ==
- October 25 – Crown Prince Abbas Mirza died in Mashhad, Iran.
