= Abdul-Karim Mousavi Ardebili =

Iranian Grand Ayatollah (1926-2016)

Seyyed Abdolkarim Mousavi Ardebili
- عبدالکریم موسوی اردبیلی
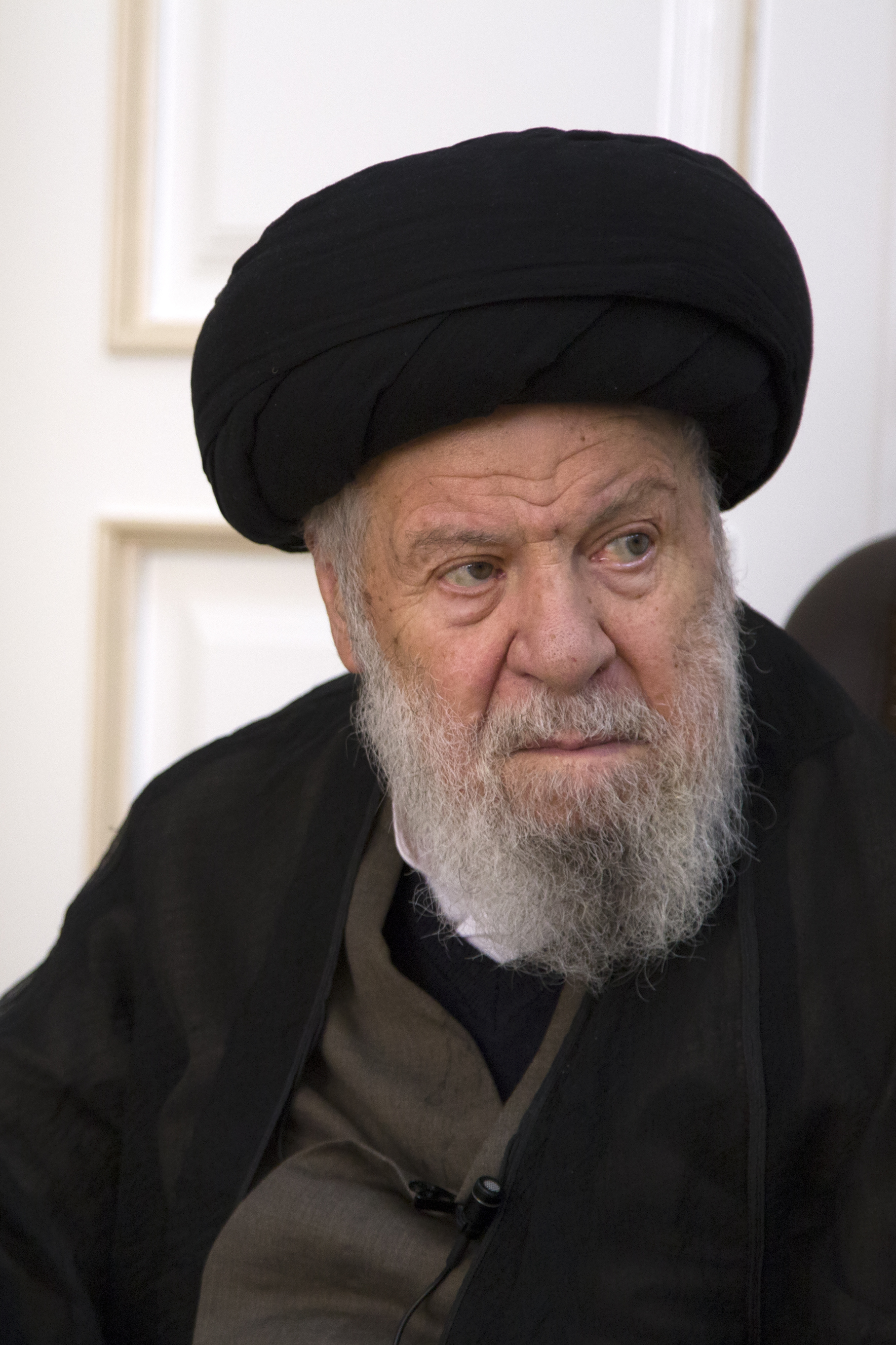
- Mousavi Ardebili in 2015

3rd Chief Justice of Iran
- In office 28 June 1981 – 15 August 1989
- Appointed by: Ruhollah Khomeini
- Preceded by: Mohammad Beheshti
- Succeeded by: Mohammad Yazdi

Attorney-General of Iran
- In office 23 February 1980 – 28 June 1981
- Appointed by: Ruhollah Khomeini
- Preceded by: Fathollah Banisadr
- Succeeded by: Mohammad-Mehdi Rabbani Amlashi

Member of the Assembly of Experts
- In office 15 August 1983 – 1 December 1991
- Constituency: Tehran Province

Personal details
- Born: 28 January 1926 Ardabil, Iran
- Died: 23 November 2016 (aged 90) Tehran, Iran
- Resting place: Fatima Masumeh Shrine, Qom
- Party: Assembly of Qom Seminary Scholars and Researchers
- Other political affiliations: Islamic Republican Party
- Education: Qom Seminary
- Website: ardebili.com

Abdolkarim Mousavi Ardebili (Persian: عبدالکریم موسوی اردبیلی, 28 January 1926 – 23 November 2016) was an Iranian reformist politician and Twelver shi'a marja.

== Education and Teaching ==
He began his religious studies in Ardabil and went to Qom in 1362 AH to continue his education. Two years later, he traveled to Najaf for further seminary studies and returned to Qom in 1367 AH. He returned to Ardabil in 1380 AH and moved to Tehran in 1388 AH. He finally returned to Qom in 1409 AH, where he remained until his death, teaching and writing. His teachers included Seyyed Mohammad Damad, Seyyed Hossein Boroujerdi, Morteza Haeri Yazdi, Mohammad Hossein Tabatabaei, Seyyed Mohsen Hakim, Mohammad Kazem Shirazi, Abolghasem Khoei, Mohammad Reza Golpayegani, Mehdi Mazandarani, Seyyed Ahmad Khansari, and Ruhollah Khomeini. His students included Seyyed Mojtaba Rudbari and Seyyed Ali Mohaqeq Damad. He died in Tehran on 23 Safar 1438 AH. His body was then transferred to Qom and buried near the shrine of Hazrat Masoumeh.

== works ==
His works include Fiqh al-Hudud wa al-Ta'zirat (four volumes), Fiqh al-Qada (two volumes), Fiqh al-Diyat, Fiqh al-Qisas, Fiqh al-Shahadat, Fiqh al-Mudarabah, Fiqh al-Shirkah wa al-Ta'min, al-Rasa'il al-Fiqhiyya, Maqalat fi Tafsir al-Qur'an, al-Iqtisad, Jamal Abha fi al-Radd 'ala al-Baha'iyya, Nahj al-Rashad, and Manasik al-Hajj.

== Political career ==
Ardebili was a supporter of Ayatollah Ruhollah Khomeini and was a friend of his. He made speeches in support of Khomeini in the 1970s. After the Iranian Revolution, he became a founding member of the Islamic Republican Party that was founded in 1979. Khomeini appointed him as chief of justice in 1981 after the impeachment of President Abulhassan Banisadr. As chief justice, he served as a member of the temporary council of the Presidency, along with the Prime Minister and Speaker, carrying out the duties of the president for up to two months.

Legal offices
Preceded by Mohammad Beheshti	Head of Judiciary System of Iran; 1981–1989	Succeeded by Mohammad Yazdi
Political offices
Preceded by Fathollah Banisadr	Attorney-General of Iran; 1980–1981	Succeeded by Mohammad-Mehdi Rabbani Amlashi
