= Chief Justice of Iran =

Head of the Iranian judiciary

Head of the Judicial System of the Islamic Republic of Iran
- رئیس قوه قضائیه جمهوری اسلامی ایران
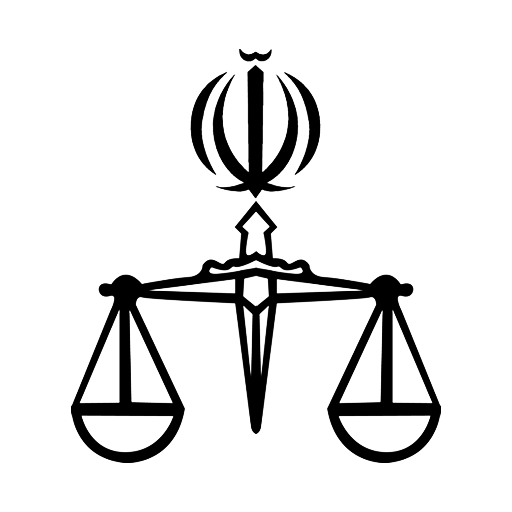
- Emblem of the Judicial System of the Islamic Republic of Iran

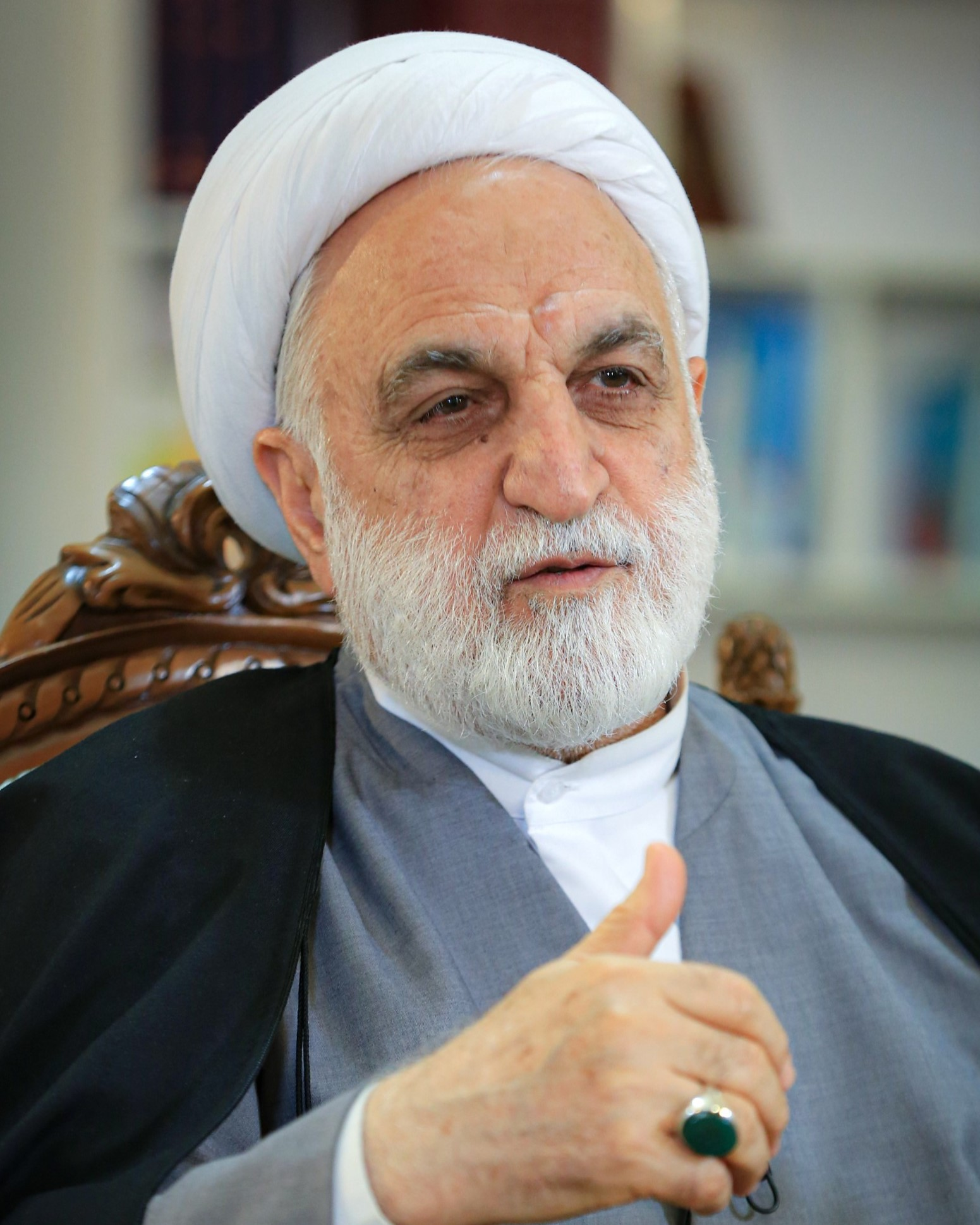
- Incumbent; Gholam-Hossein Mohseni-Eje'i since 1 July 2021
- Appointer: Supreme Leader of Iran
- Term length: 5 years, renewable once
- Inaugural holder: Mehdi Sajjadian
- Website: Official website

The head of the Judicial System of the Islamic Republic of Iran (Persian: رئیس قوه قضائیه جمهوری اسلامی ایران, romanized: Raeis Ghooh Ghazaiyeh Jamehori Eslami Iran), also known as the chief justice of Iran, is the leader of the judicial system of the Islamic Republic of Iran and is responsible for its administration and supervision.

The position is required to be an "honorable man" according to Article 157 [Head of Judiciary] of the Constitution of Iran. The supreme leader of Iran has the authority to appoint and dismiss the chief justice. The chief justice may serve up to two five-year terms. The chief justice is also the highest-ranking judge of the Supreme Court of Iran. Additionally, the chief justice nominates several candidates for the position of Minister of Justice, from whom the president of Iran selects one.

== Chief justices since 1979 ==
No.	Name (Birth–Death)	Portrait	Took office	Left office	Political party	Appointer
1	Mehdi Sajjadian (1912–2002)		4 April 1979	23 February 1980	None	Asadollah Mobasheri
2	Mohammad Beheshti (1928–1981)		23 February 1980	28 June 1981 (assassinated)	Islamic Republican Party	Ruhollah Khomeini
3	Abdul-Karim Mousavi Ardebili (1926–2016)		28 June 1981	15 August 1989	Islamic Republican Party	Ruhollah Khomeini
4	Mohammad Yazdi (1934–2020)		15 August 1989	14 August 1999	Society of Seminary Teachers of Qom	Ali Khamenei
4	Mohammad Yazdi (1934–2020)		15 August 1989	14 August 1999	Combatant Clergy Association	Ali Khamenei
5	Mahmoud Hashemi Shahroudi (1948–2018)		14 August 1999	14 August 2009	Society of Seminary Teachers of Qom	Ali Khamenei
6	Sadeq Larijani (born 1963)		14 August 2009	7 March 2019	Society of Seminary Teachers of Qom	Ali Khamenei
6	Sadeq Larijani (born 1963)		14 August 2009	7 March 2019	Combatant Clergy Association	Ali Khamenei
7	Ebrahim Raisi (1960–2024)		7 March 2019	1 July 2021	Combatant Clergy Association	Ali Khamenei
8	Gholam-Hossein Mohseni-Eje'i (born 1958)		1 July 2021	Incumbent	Society of Seminary Teachers of Qom	Ali Khamenei
