= 1910 in Iran =

- Decades
- See also: Other events of 1910; Years in Iran

The following lists events that happened during 1910 in Qajar era.

== Incumbents ==
- Monarch: Ahmad Shah Qajar
- Prime Minister: Mohammad Vali Khan Khalatbari Tonekaboni (until July 25), Mostowfi ol-Mamalek (starting July 25)

== Events ==
- October 30 – Shiraz pogrom.

== Births ==
- January 20 – Abdol Hossein Hamzavi, Iranian diplomat and writer.
- February 15 – Mushegh Sarvarian, Iranian-Armenian film director, Producer, Writer.
- March 1 – Parviz Aboutaleb, Iranian football player.
- May 1 – Aramais Aghamalian, Iranian film director and screenwriter.
- August 4 – Nematollah Nassiri, Persian politician.
- September 9 – Jafar Sharif-Emami, Persian engineer and politician.
- October 25 – Gholamhossein Mosahab, Iranian mathematician; founder of modern encyclopedia writing in Iran.
- ? – Ahmad Fardid, Iranian philosopher.
- ? – Ali Sami Shirazi, Iranian archaeologist.
- ? – Farajollah Rasaei, Iranian admiral.
- ? – Golchin Gilani, Iranian poet.
- ? – Hasan Amid, Iranian writer and journalist.
- ? – Hossein Fatemi, Iranian politician.
- ? – Malekeh Malekzadeh Bayani, Iranian archaeologist and historian.
- ? – Mohamed Dadkhah, Iranian philatelist.
- ? – Moluk Zarabi, Iranian singer.
- ? – Nasrollah Khadem, Nasrollah Khadem.
- ? – Parviz Mahmoud, Iranian musician.
- ? – Seyed Karim Amiri Firuzkuhi, Iranian poet.
- ? – Taghi Riahi, Persian military personnel and politician.

== Deaths ==
- September 22 – Ali Reza Khan Azod-ol-Molk, Iranian politician.
- October 1 – Taj ol-Molouk, Royal consort.
- ? – Ali Monsieur, Iranian politician.
- ? – Seyyed Abdollah Behbahani, Persian Shi'a theologian.
- ? – Zeyn al-Abedin Maraghei, Persian novelist.
