= 1906 in Iran =

- Decades
- See also: Other events of 1906; Years in Iran

The following lists events that happened during 1906 in Qajar era.

== Incumbents ==
- Monarch: Mozaffar ad-Din Shah Qajar

== Events ==
- 1906 Persian legislative election.

== Births ==
- January 6 – Mohammad Kazem Shariatmadari, Iranian Grand Ayatollah.
- March 17 – Bahram Aryana, Iranian general.
- May 5 – Louise Aslanian, WWII French-Armenian resistance activist.
- September 6 – Mozaffar Firouz, Qajar politician.
- October 28 – Ruhollah Khatami, Iranian Ayatollah.
- December 11 – Malak Jân Nemati, Kudish poet.
- ? – Abdolhossein Noushin, Iranian playwright and film director.
- ? – Abdollah Riazi, Persian politician.
- ? – Abu'l-Qásim Faizi, Persian Bahá'í.
- ? – Ahmad Ebadi, Iranian musician.
- ? – Ali Zohari, Iranian politician.
- ? – Arsen Minasian, Iranian scientist.
- ? – Asadollah Sanii, Iranian politician.
- ? – Bersabe Hovsepyan-Snhchyan, Iranian educator and school founder.
- ? – Ganjali Sabahi, Iranian Azerbaijani writer.
- ? – Ghulam Yahya Daneshian, politician, major general.
- ? – Hajar Tarbiat, Iranian politician.
- ? – Hosein Lorzade, Iranian artist and architect.
- ? – Mehdi Bayani, Iranian calligrapher and librarian.
- ? – Mehrangiz Manouchehrian, Iranian politician and lawyer.
- ? – Mohammad-Hossein Shahriar, Iranian poet.
- ? – Ruhollah Khaleqi, Iranian musician.
- ? – Kazem Hassibi, Iranian politician.
