= 1912 in Iran =

- Decades
- See also: Other events of 1912; Years in Iran

The following lists events that happened during 1912 in Qajar era.

== Incumbents ==
- Monarch: Ahmad Shah Qajar
- Prime Minister: Najaf-Qoli Khan Bakhtiari

== Births ==
- February 18 – Gholam Reza Azhari, Iranian military leader and prime minister.
- March 17 – Eskandar Azmoudeh, Iranian military officer.
- April 20 – Zahra Kia, Iranian writer and translator.
- June 2 – Laurence Paul Elwell-Sutton, British orientalist.
- June 11 – Mohammad Hassan Ganji, Iranian meteorologist.
- July 23 – Mozzafar Baghai, Iranian politician.
- December 1 – Hassan Alavikia, Iranian general.
- ? – Abbas Ali Khalatbari, Persian diplomat and politician.
- ? – Abbas Almohri, Kuwaiti scholar.
- ? – Ali Safi Golpaygani, Iranian grand ayatollah.
- ? – Fakhrozzaman Jabbar Vaziri, Iranian actress.
- ? – Hossein Tehrāni, Iranian musician.
- ? – Javad Maroufi, Iranian musician.
- ? – Javad Sadr, Iranian politician.
- ? – Sabar Farmanfarmaian, Iran Minister of Health, doctor, nobility.
- ? – Siah Khan, Gigantism patient.
- ? – Tayeb Hajrezaei, businessman.
- ? – Vahan Terpanchian, Iranian cinematographer and film producer.
- ? – ʻAlí-Muhammad Varqá, Baha'i college professor.
- ? – Moshfegh Hamadani, Iranian journalist, writer and translator.

== Deaths ==
- April 29 – Subh-i-Azal, Persian religious leader.
- May 6 – Yeprem Khan, Armenian revolutionary.
- ? – Abdollah Mirza Qajar, Iranian photographer.
- ? – Hajji Ali Davachi, Iranian revolutionary.
- ? – Mishkín-Qalam, prominent Bahá'í and calligrapher of 19th-century Persia.
