= Wedding fire =

Wedding fire may refer to:

- 2009 Kuwait wedding fire
- Qaraqosh wedding fire
