= Leo Buscaglia =

American professor of special education, motivational speaker, author (1924–1998)

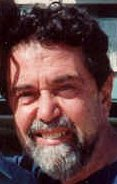
- Buscaglia in 1989
- Born: March 31, 1924; Los Angeles, California, U.S.
- Died: June 12, 1998 (aged 74); Glenbrook, Nevada, U.S.
- Education: University of Southern California
- Occupations: Motivational speaker; writer; professor

Felice Leonardo Buscaglia (March 31, 1924 – June 12, 1998), also known as "Dr. Love", was an American author, motivational speaker, and a professor in the Department of Special Education at the University of Southern California.

== Life and career ==
Felice Leonardo Buscaglia was born in Los Angeles, California, on March 31, 1924, into a family of Italian immigrants. He spent his early childhood in Aosta, Italy, before going back to the United States for education. He was a graduate of Theodore Roosevelt High School. Buscaglia served in the U.S. Navy during World War II; he did not see combat, but he saw its aftermath in his duties in the dental section of the military hospital, helping to reconstruct shattered faces. Using G.I. Bill benefits, he entered the University of Southern California, where he earned three degrees (BA 1950, MA 1954, PhD 1963) before eventually joining the faculty. He was known for always getting on the elevator and putting his back to the door and introduce himself saying "This might be the only chance I'll ever get to meet you and I don't want to miss this chance." He would rake the leaves in his yard and put them in a room in his house so he could sit and study them. He was fascinated that God would go to the trouble to make every leaf different. "Imagine how proud he is of us if he goes to that much trouble for a simple leaf on a tree."

Upon retirement, Buscaglia was named Professor at Large, one of only two such designations on campus at that time.

== Student's suicide ==
While teaching at USC, Buscaglia was moved by a student's suicide to contemplate human disconnectedness and the meaning of life, and began a noncredit class he called Love 1A. This became the basis for his first book, titled simply Love. His dynamic speaking style was discovered by the Public Broadcasting Service (PBS), and his televised lectures earned great popularity in the 1980s. At one point his talks, always shown during fundraising periods, were the top earners of all PBS programs. This national exposure, coupled with the heartfelt storytelling style of his books, helped make all his titles national bestsellers; five were once on the New York Times bestsellers list simultaneously.

== Death ==
Buscaglia died of a heart attack on June 12, 1998, at his home in Glenbrook, Nevada, near Lake Tahoe, when he was 74.

== In popular culture ==
In a May 12, 1984, Peanuts comic strip, the dog Snoopy is seen strolling towards Charlie Brown and Sally. Snoopy gives them both warm and sincere hugs. Afterwards, Charlie Brown explains their dog's actions to his puzzled sister: "You can always tell when he's been listening to Leo Buscaglia tapes."

Buscaglia's "Dr. Love" moniker, PBS lectures, and philosophy of hugs were referenced in Season 2, Episode 1 of The Americans.

In an April 22, 1991 The Far Side comic strip, a man dressed like a bullfighter awaits the charge of another man with outstretched arms. The caption reads: "In some remote areas of the world, the popular sport is to watch a courageous young man avoid being hugged by a Leo Buscaglia impersonator."

In the August 1993 issue of Spectacular Spider-Man (vol. 1) #203, the character of Carnage taunts Spider-Man by saying: "Ah... even with his last breath—he's doing his Leo Buscaglia impression!"

In Season 6, Episode 19 of Mystery Science Theater 3000, TV's Frank reads a card to Dr. Clayton Forrester, who is wearing a full-body bandage: "Oh look at this, it's a card from Leo Buscaglia! 'Hope you die, you rotten bast--' Oh well."

== Bibliography ==
- Love (1972)
- Because I Am Human (1972)
- The Way of the Bull (1973)
- The Fall of Freddie the Leaf (1982)
- Living, Loving and Learning (1982)
- The Disabled and Their Parents: A Counseling Challenge (1983)
- Loving Each Other (1984)
- Amar a los demás (1985)
- Personhood (1986)
- Bus 9 to Paradise (1986)
- Seven Stories of Christmas Love (1987)
- A Memory for Tino (1988)
- Papa My Father (1989)
- Born for Love (1992)
