= 2024 Mangaf building fire =

2024 residential building fire in Kuwait

- Still from a video capturing the event, showing fire and smoke coming out of the building
- Location of the Building, Mangaf, Kuwait
- Date: 12 June 2024
- Location: Mangaf, Ahmadi Governorate, Kuwait; 29.0957°N 48.1335°E
- Type: Structure fire
- Cause: Short circuit
- Deaths: 50
- Injuries: 50

On 12 June 2024, an early-morning fire broke out at a residential building in Mangaf in Kuwait's Ahmadi Governorate housing 196 male migrant workers of NBTC Group, killing 50 migrant workers, at least 46 of whom were from India, and injuring around 50 others. Most victims died of smoke inhalation, while others were fatally injured from falling. The building's owner was arrested in the wake of the fire.

Indian officials such as Prime Minister Narendra Modi and Minister of State for External Affairs Kirti Vardhan Singh offered condolences and aid for the relatives of the victims. They also arranged for the repatriation of the remains of their deceased nationals.

== Incident ==
The fire was reported at 04:00 AST (01:00 GMT) on the ground floor of a six-storey residential building housing 196 all-male migrant workers of NBTC Group, which also leased the site. The fire began in the security room before spreading to the kitchen. Flames engulfed the lower part of the building and thick black smoke billowed from the upper floors. Most of the deaths were a result of smoke inhalation while sleeping, while several victims suffered from fall injuries. Security agencies rescued 67 people. Five firefighters were injured during the rescue efforts. Firefighters extinguished the blaze 10 minutes after they arrived.

A preliminary investigation found that the fire was caused by an electrical short circuit in the security guard's room located on the ground floor of the building and was exacerbated by the use of a flammable material to partition apartments and rooms. It also found that victims were prevented from escaping to the rooftop by a locked door.

== Victims ==
Fifty people were killed, and at least another 50 were injured and taken to hospital. All victims were male migrant workers, the majority from India, who were all employed for the NBTC Group. Indian embassy officials visited the injured in hospitals. As of 14 June, 48 bodies had been identified. It was the second deadliest fire in Kuwait since an arson attack in 2009 that killed 57 people.

At least 46 of the dead were from India, including at least 23 from Kerala, (Note: Denny Baby's family with family roots in Karunagappally was settled in Virar, Maharashtra, at the time of his death, so he is not included as a Keralite in this figure.) seven from Tamil Nadu, three from Andhra Pradesh and Uttar Pradesh, two from Odisha, and one each from Bihar, Haryana, Jharkhand, Karnataka, Punjab, Maharashtra and West Bengal. Their ages ranged between 20 and 50. Hospitals in the area admitted 56 patients from the fire. Around 50 Indians were injured, over 30 of whom were treated at Al Adan hospital, which was later visited by the Indian ambassador to Kuwait, Adarsh Swaika. Three overseas Filipino workers also died while two others were in a critical condition. Nepali nationals were among the injured.

Kuwait is highly dependent on migrant labour, but their poor living conditions have been noted by human rights groups. From 2022 to 2024, over 1,400 Indian workers died in Kuwait, and the Indian embassy in Kuwait City received 16,423 complaints from March 2021 to December 2023 due to payment delays, harassment, and substandard accommodation. A large number of migrants returned to India due to the COVID-19 pandemic.

== Aftermath ==
Deputy Prime Minister Sheikh Fahad Yusuf al-Sabah ordered the arrest of the building's owner and said violations of building standards led to the disaster. A senior police officer told state TV that warnings were often issued about overcrowding in this type of accommodation. The building's owner was later detained for negligence.

== Reactions ==
Indian Prime Minister Narendra Modi called the disaster "saddening" and expressed condolences to the victims and their relatives. He announced an ex-gratia relief of ₹200,000 (US$2,394) to each of the families of the deceased Indian nationals from the Prime Minister's Relief Fund. The Government of Kerala also pledged ₹500,000 in financial assistance to the families of people from the state that died. Indian Foreign Minister S. Jaishankar also offered condolences, and Minister of State for External Affairs Kirti Vardhan Singh said that he would provide assistance and repatriate the dead. On 14 June, their bodies were returned to India aboard an Indian Air Force aircraft, stopping first in Kochi, where the dead from south India were released, before proceeding to Delhi, where the remaining victims were claimed. The Filipino fatalities were repatriated on 17 June.

Saudi Arabia's King Salman and Crown Prince Mohammed bin Salman shared their condolences for Kuwait, with the king wishing a speedy recovery for the injured. The foreign ministries of the United Arab Emirates and Iran also expressed solidarity with Kuwait.

On 13 June, the Kerala Catholic Bishops' Council (KCBC), the Regional Bishops' Council for the State of Kerala, expressed their condolences to the families of all victims, calling the disaster "heartbreaking". Kerala reported a significant number of victims – 26 casualties, many identified as Christian. Its spokesperson, Father Jacob Palakkappilly, added that they were praying for the speedy recovery of the injured.

On 18 June, the Kuwait government announced $15,000 (about 4,600 Kuwaiti dinars or ₹1,250,000) compensation to the families of the victims of the fire. NBTC group announced aid of 8 lakh rupees to the families of the victims of fire and assured ongoing support to them. Executives M. A. Yusuff Ali and Ravi Pillai announced aid of 5 lakh rupees and 2 lakh rupees respectively to each family. Philanthropist Saad Kassis-Mohamed had offered support to affected workers and their families.

== See also ==
- 2009 Kuwait wedding fire
