= Sepahsalar Mosque =

Mosque in Tehran, Iran

Sepahsālār Mosque
- مسجد سپهسالار
- The mosque in 1974

- Location in Tehran

Religion
- Affiliation: Shia Islam
- Ecclesiastical or organisational status: Mosque and madrasa
- Status: Active

Location
- Location: Baharestan, Tehran, Tehran Province
- Country: Iran
- Coordinates: 35°41′19.5″N 51°25′58.37″E

Architecture
- Architects: Mirza Mehdi Khan Shaghaghi (concept); Hosein Lorzade (shabestan)
- Type: Mosque architecture
- Style: Qajar; Persian; Ottoman
- Founder: Mirza Hosein Sepahsalar (1879); Naser al-Din Shah Qajar (1881)
- Groundbreaking: 1879 CE
- Completed: 1884 CE

Specifications
- Length: 62 m (203 ft)
- Width: 61 m (200 ft)
- Interior area: 16,000 m^{2} (170,000 sq ft)
- Dome: Two (maybe more)
- Dome height (outer): 37 m (121 ft)
- Minaret: 8
- Minaret height: 37 m (121 ft)
- Materials: Bricks; stone; plaster; tile; marble
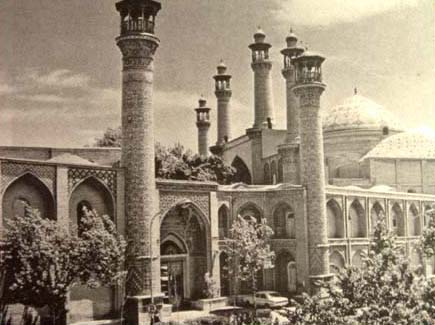
- The mosque in the 1960s

Iran National Heritage List
- Official name: Sepahsālār Mosque
- Type: Mosque/Religious School
- Designated: 1936
- Reference no.: 260
- Conservation organization: Cultural Heritage, Handicrafts and Tourism Organization of Iran

The Sepahsālār Mosque (Persian: مسجد سپهسالار, romanized: Masjed-e Sepahsālār) is a mosque and madrasa located in the Baharestan district of the city of Tehran, in the province of Tehran, Iran. Construction of the mosque commenced in 1879 CE upon the order of Mirza Hosein Sepahsalar, a Grand Vizier of Iran during the reign of Naser al-Din Shah Qajar, and the first phase of construction was finished in 1884 CE. The mosque was renamed the Shahid Motahhari (مسجد شهید مطهری) or the Motahhari Mosque, after the 1979 Iranian Revolution, but it is commonly known by its original name.

The Sepahsalar Mosque is one of the largest mosques in Tehran. During the late Qajar as well as Pahlavi eras, the Sepahsalar Mosque was a distinctive landmark of Tehran with its eight minarets, a unique design among Iranian mosques. The mosque was added to the Iran National Heritage List on 20 June 1936, administered by the Cultural Heritage, Handicrafts and Tourism Organization of Iran.

== Architecture ==
Designed by Mirza Mehdi Khan Shaghaghi, also known as Momtahen ud-Doleh, the Sepahsalar Mosque is the first mosque in Tehran whose design is a mix of Persian and Ottoman styles. The building is inspired by Jameh Mosque of Isfahan, Chaharbagh School and Sultan Ahmed Mosque. The mosque has a special dome and eight minarets.

The main entrance portal and the façade are of a quite distinctive Qajar style. Two massive minarets flank the recessed entrance, which leads into a large sahn surrounded by twin-storeyed arcades of college rooms; in all there are some 60 chambers.

Tiles with full-blown floral girih motifs in a typically flamboyant Qajar style decorate the courtyard, while a tile inscription band gives details of the original endowment. The prayer hall dome, 37 metres (121 ft) in height, is supported by 44 columns.

The mosque has a clock with three bells that was crafted in France in 1880. This exquisite timepiece sits atop a 5-metre-high (16 ft) tiled room between two minarets over the north iwan. The sound of the bells resonates through the mosque complex. There are numerous inscriptions on the mosque in both Thuluth and Kufic scripts.

== Events ==
Former Prime Minister and Minister of the Royal Court Abdolhossein Hazhir was assassinated by a member of the Fada'iyan-e Islam at the mosque in November 1949.

== Gallery ==
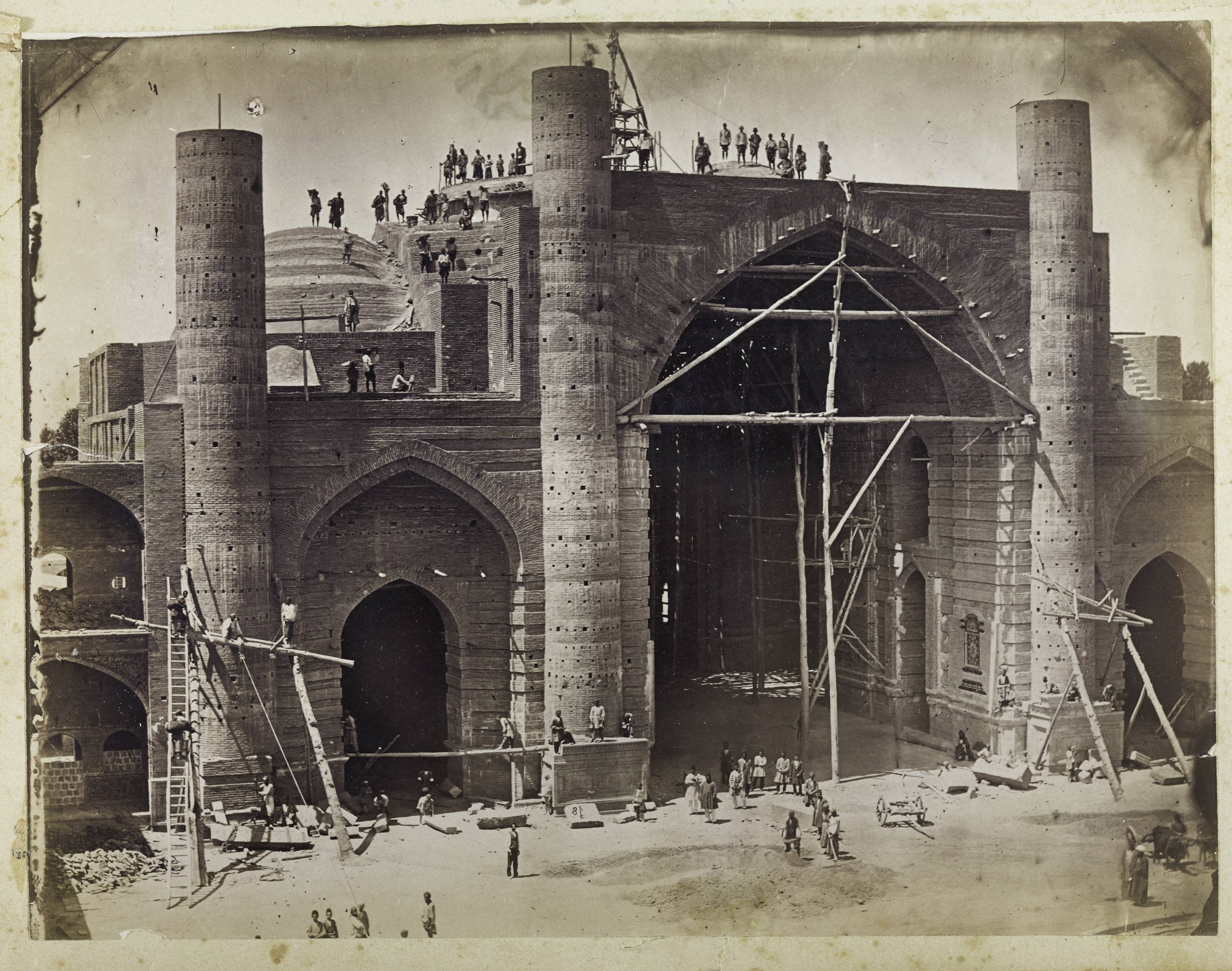
Under construction, 1879–1884

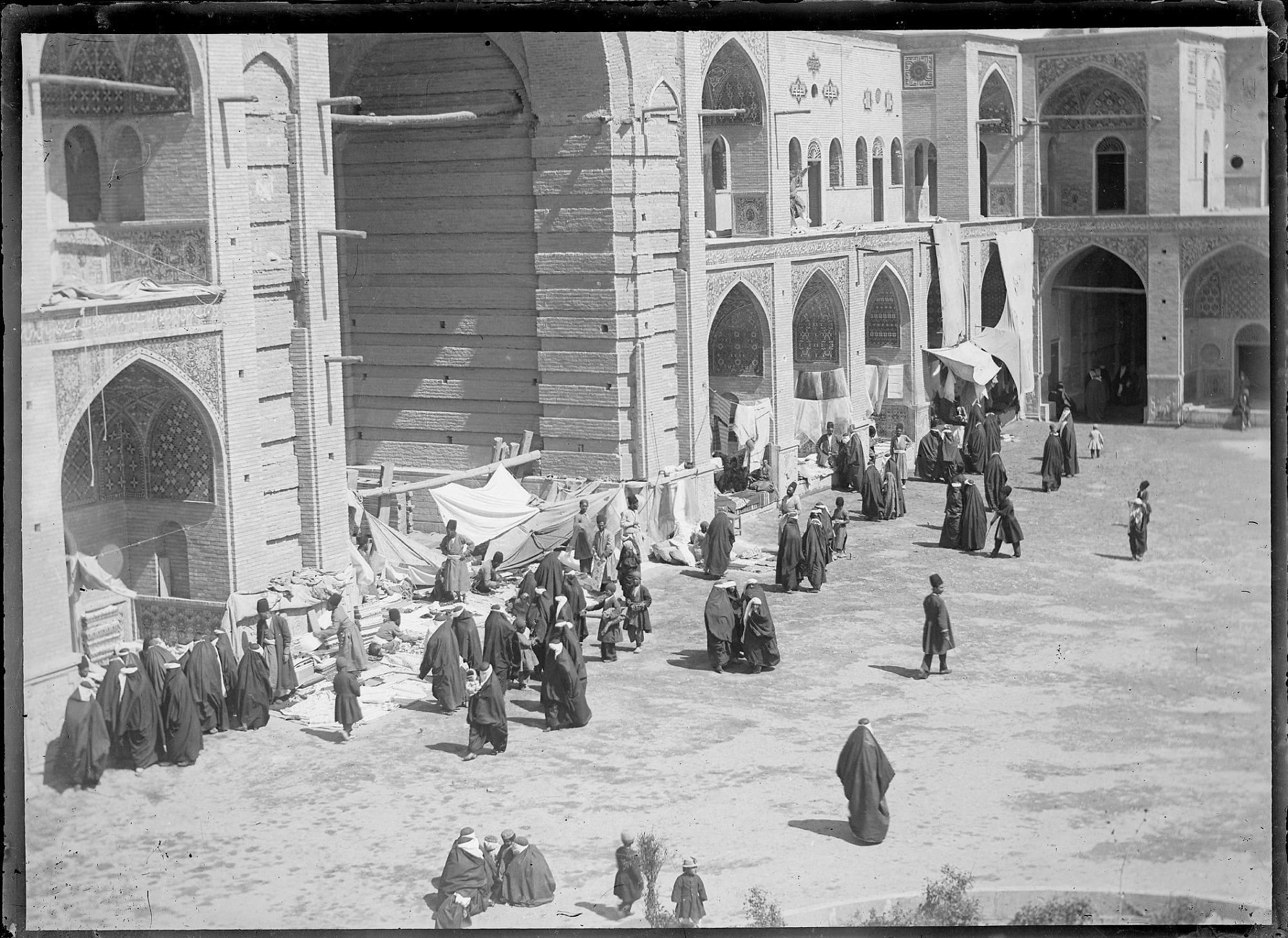
Sepahsalar Mosque during the Qajar era

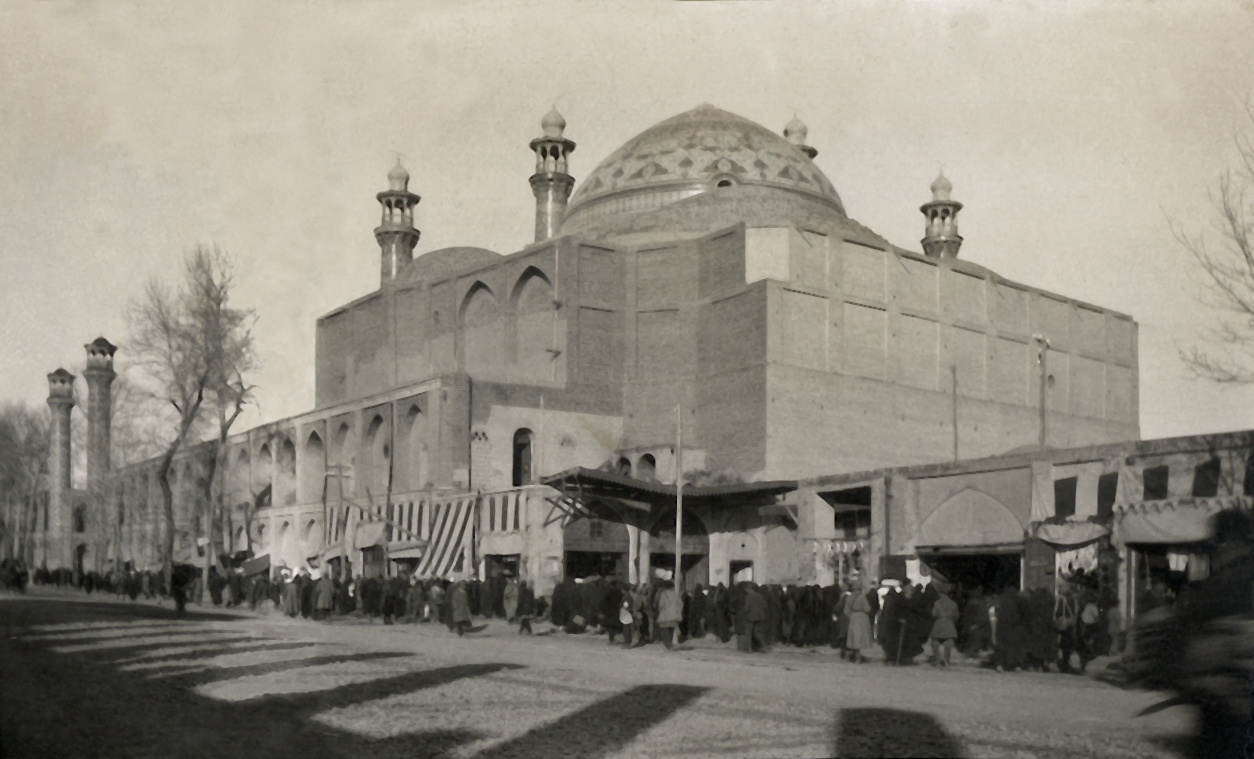
Sepahsalar Mosque, 1930s

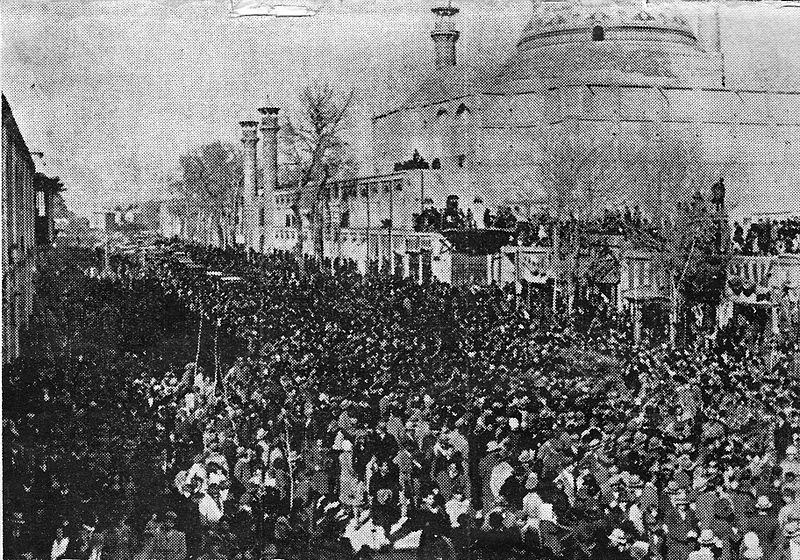
Ali-Akbar Davar funeral

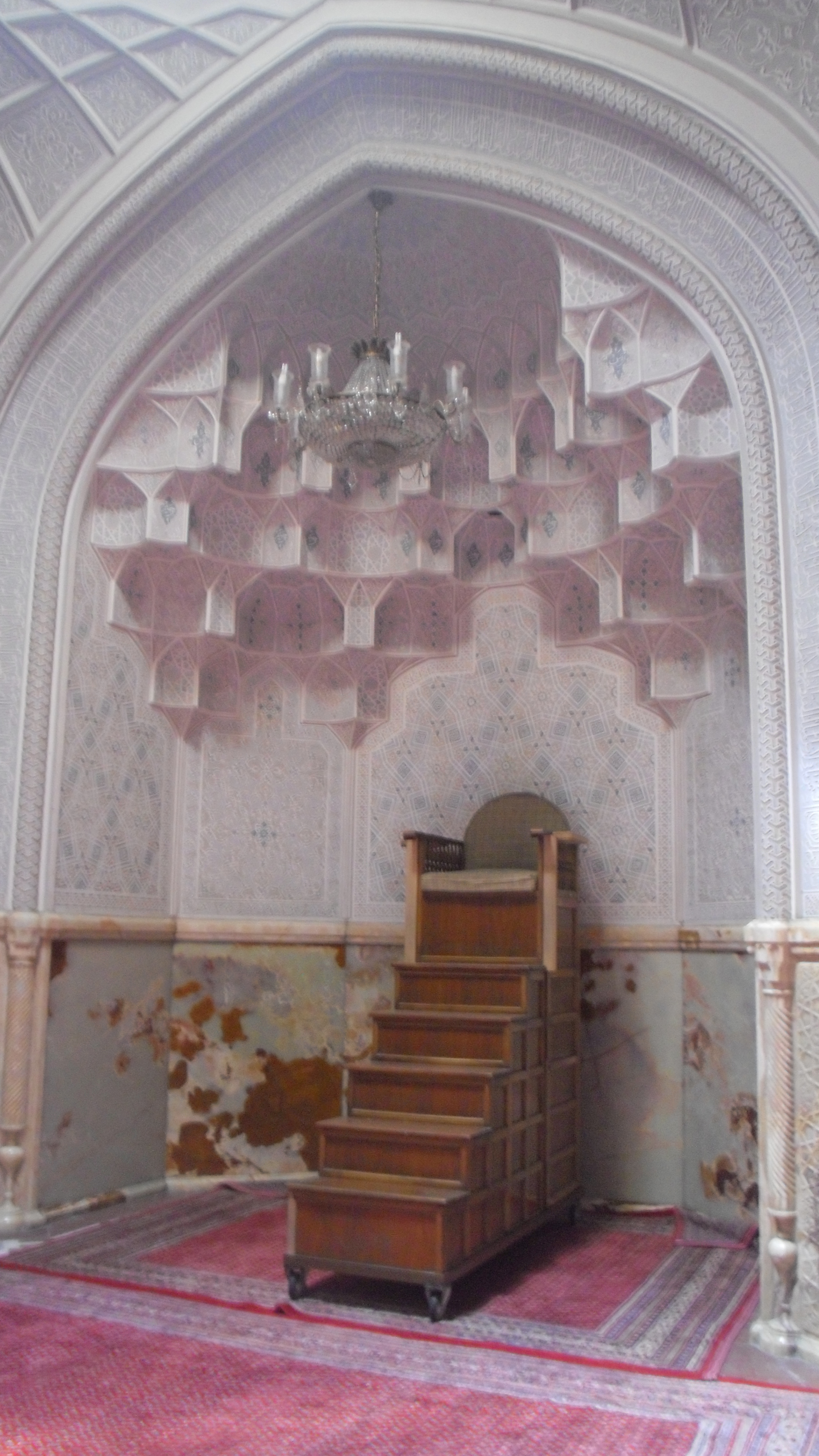
Sanctuary

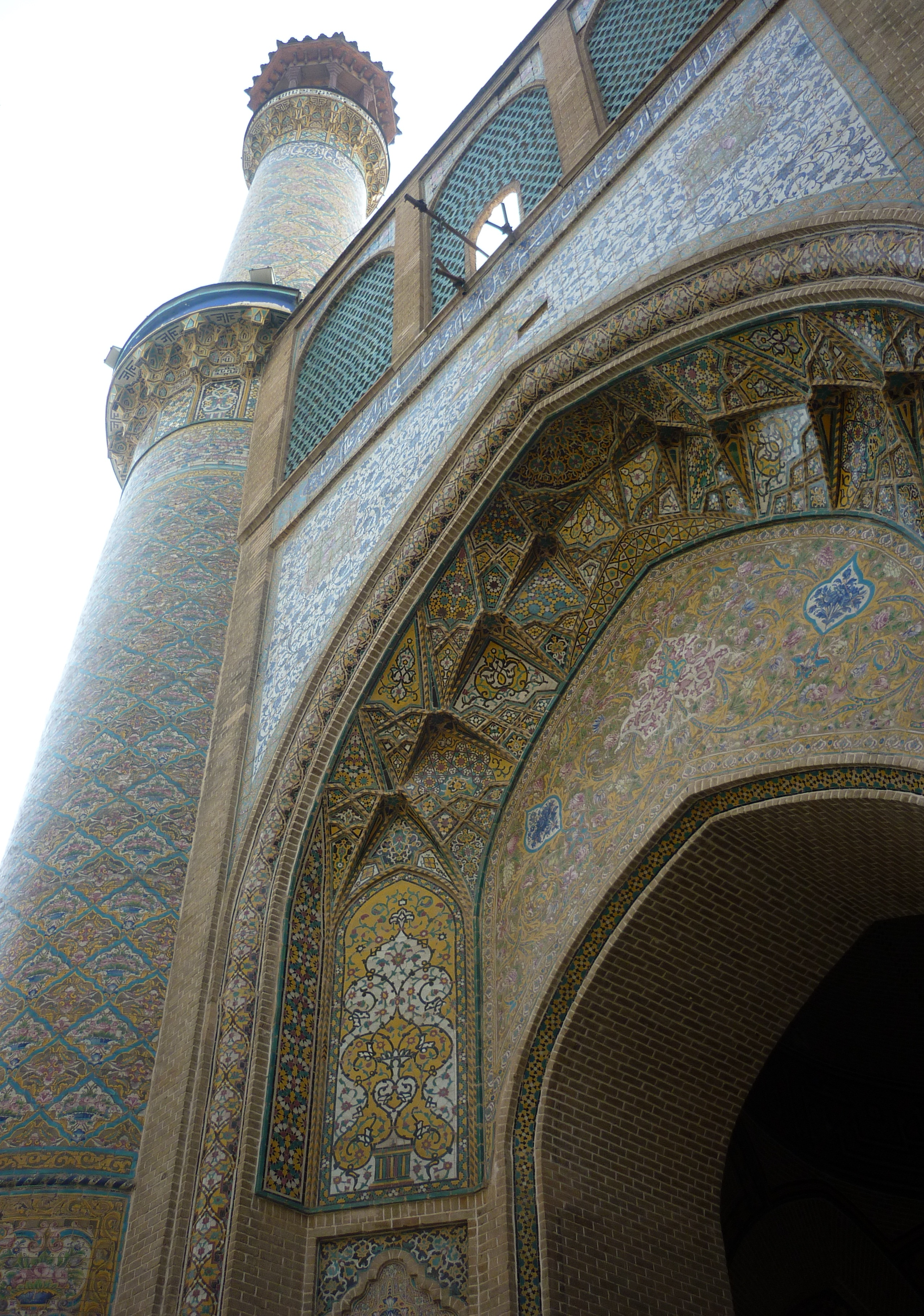
A view of an iwan and minaret

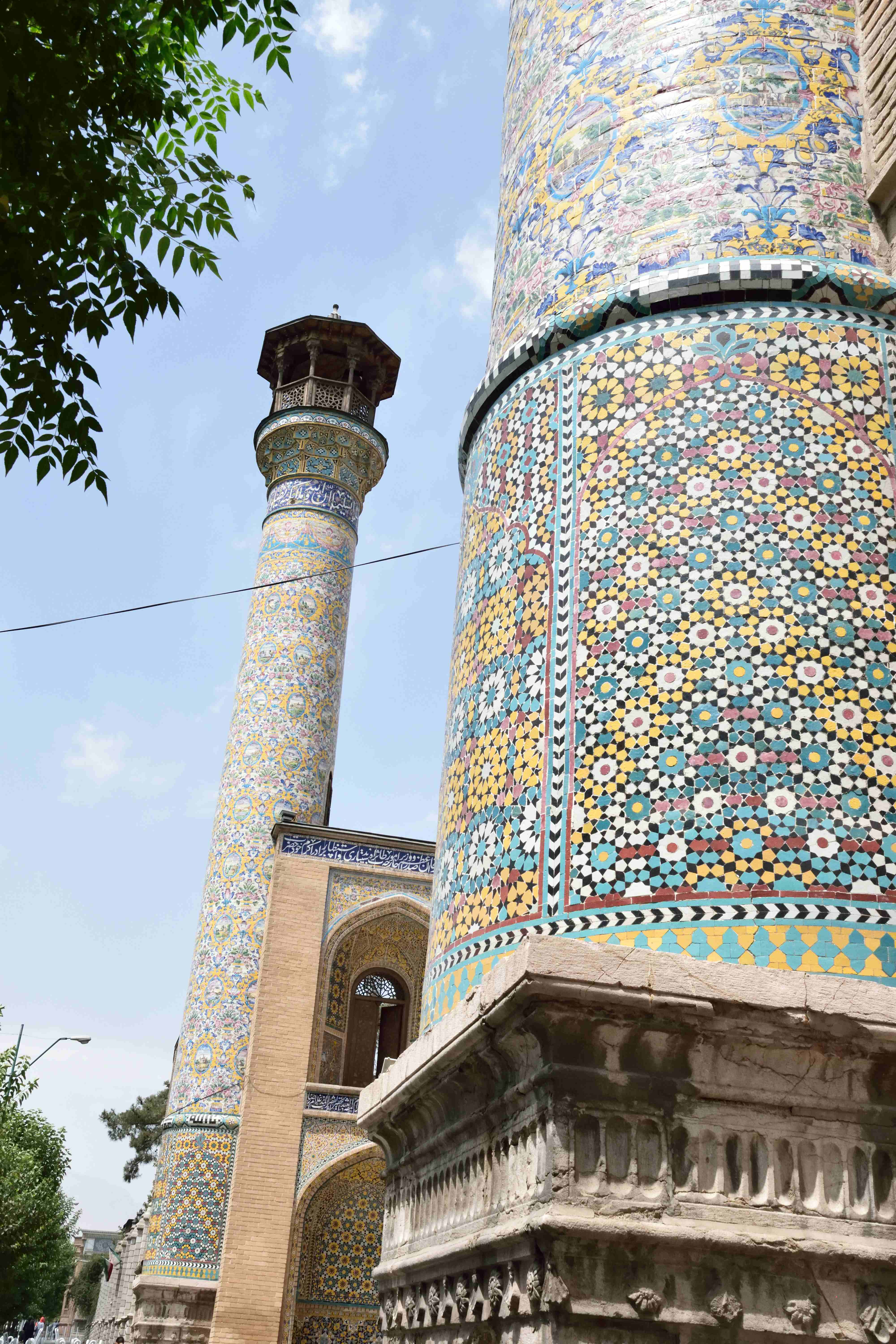
Minaret

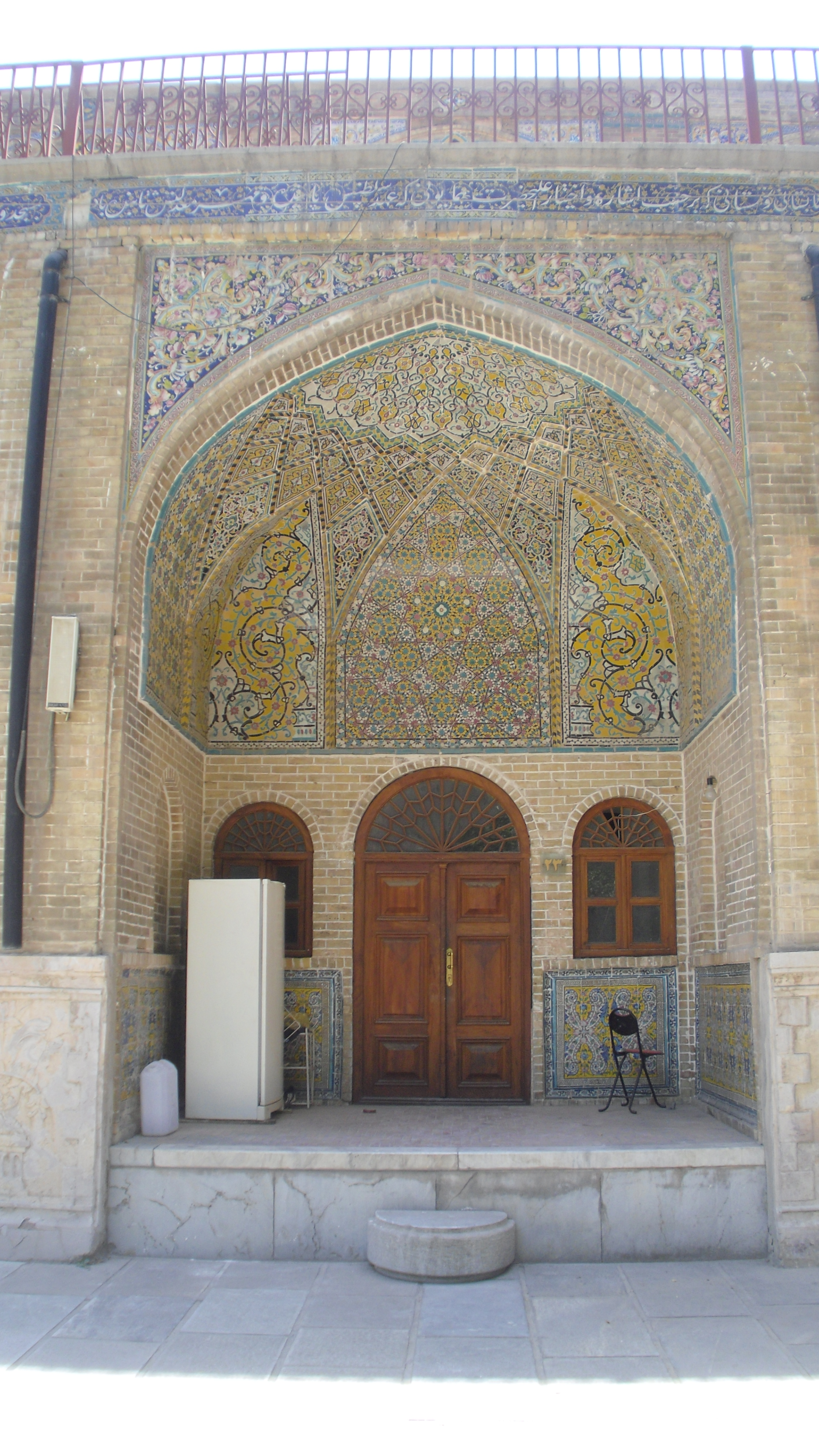
Oldest Room in Sepahsalar High School

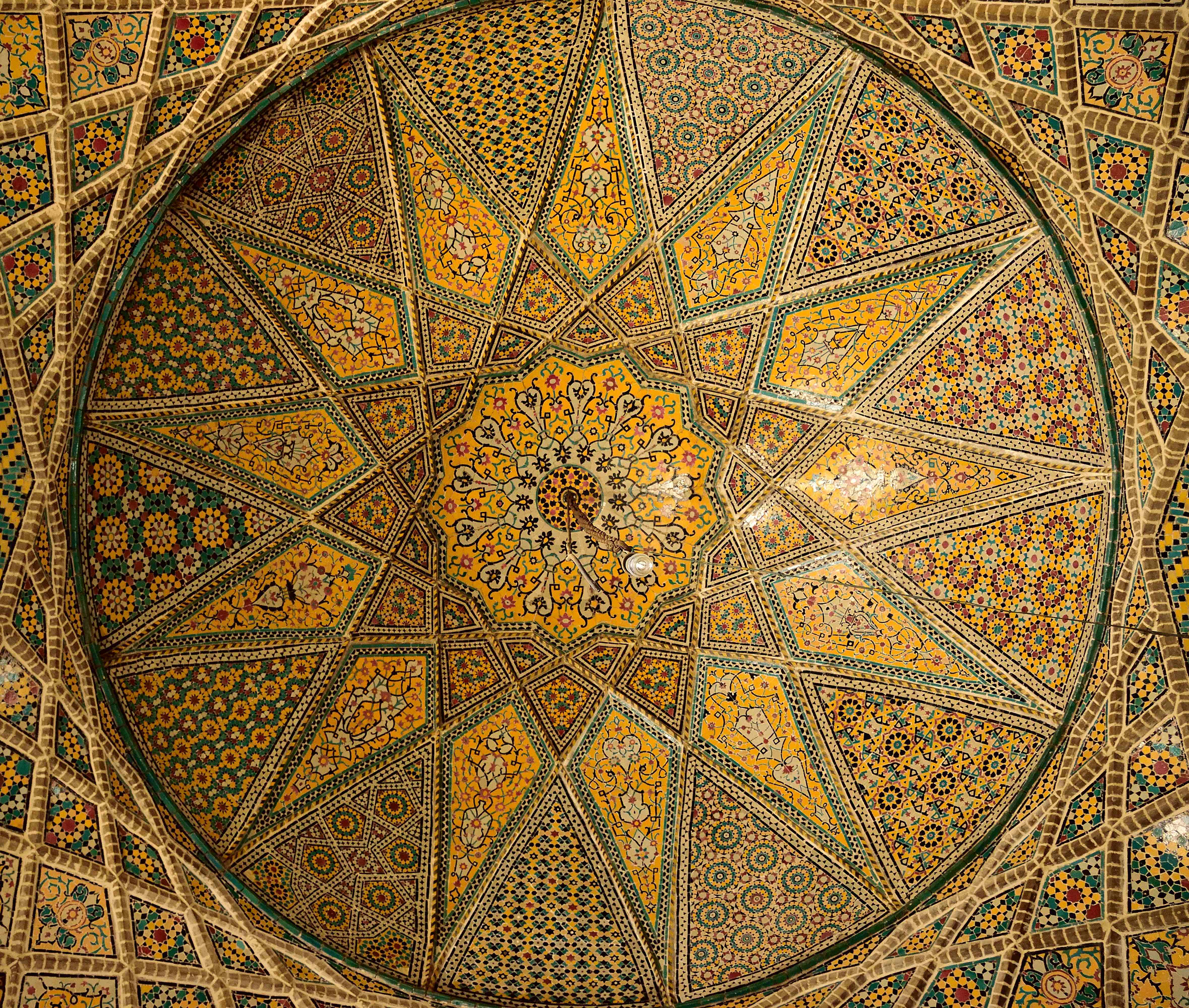
Interior dome

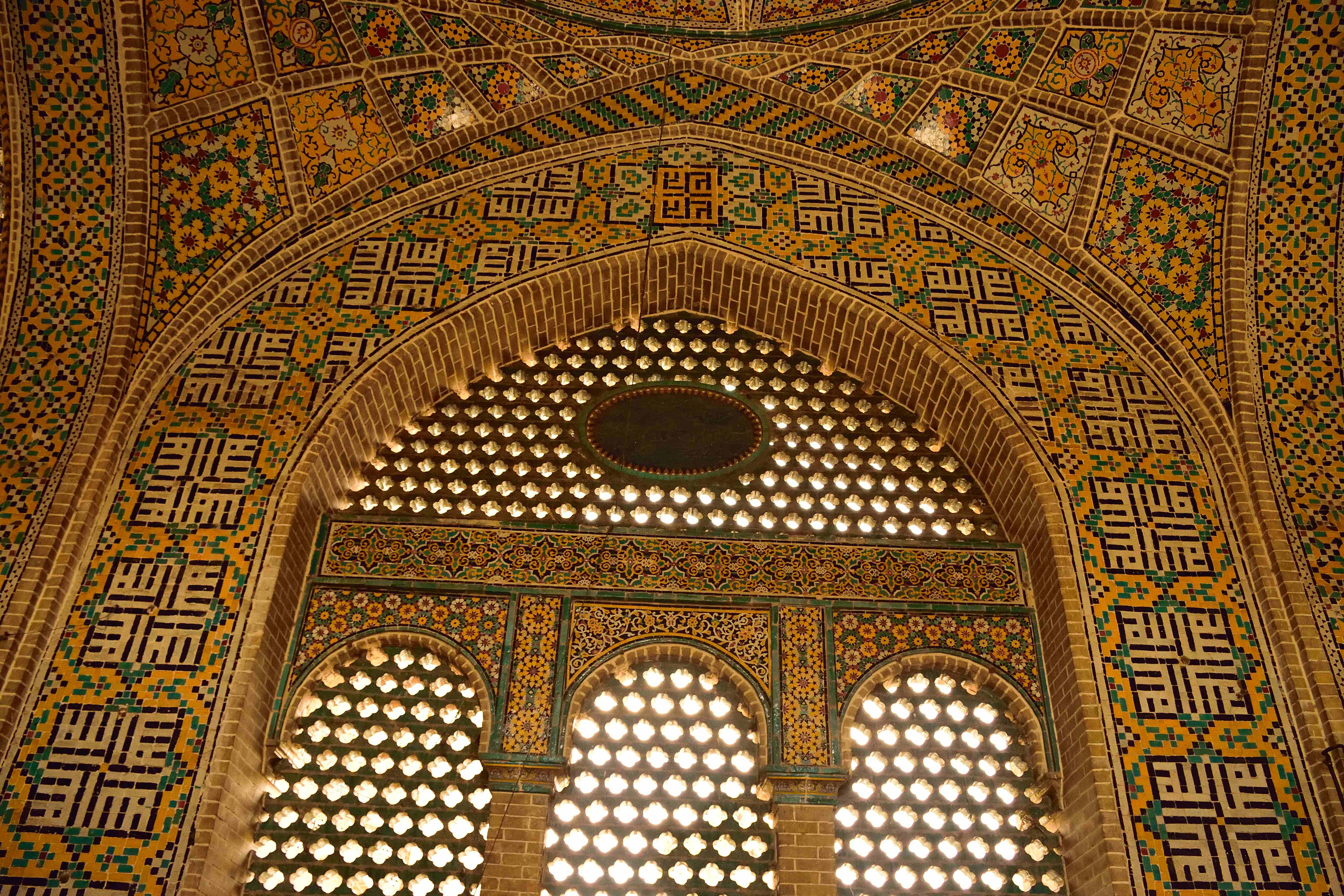
Walls

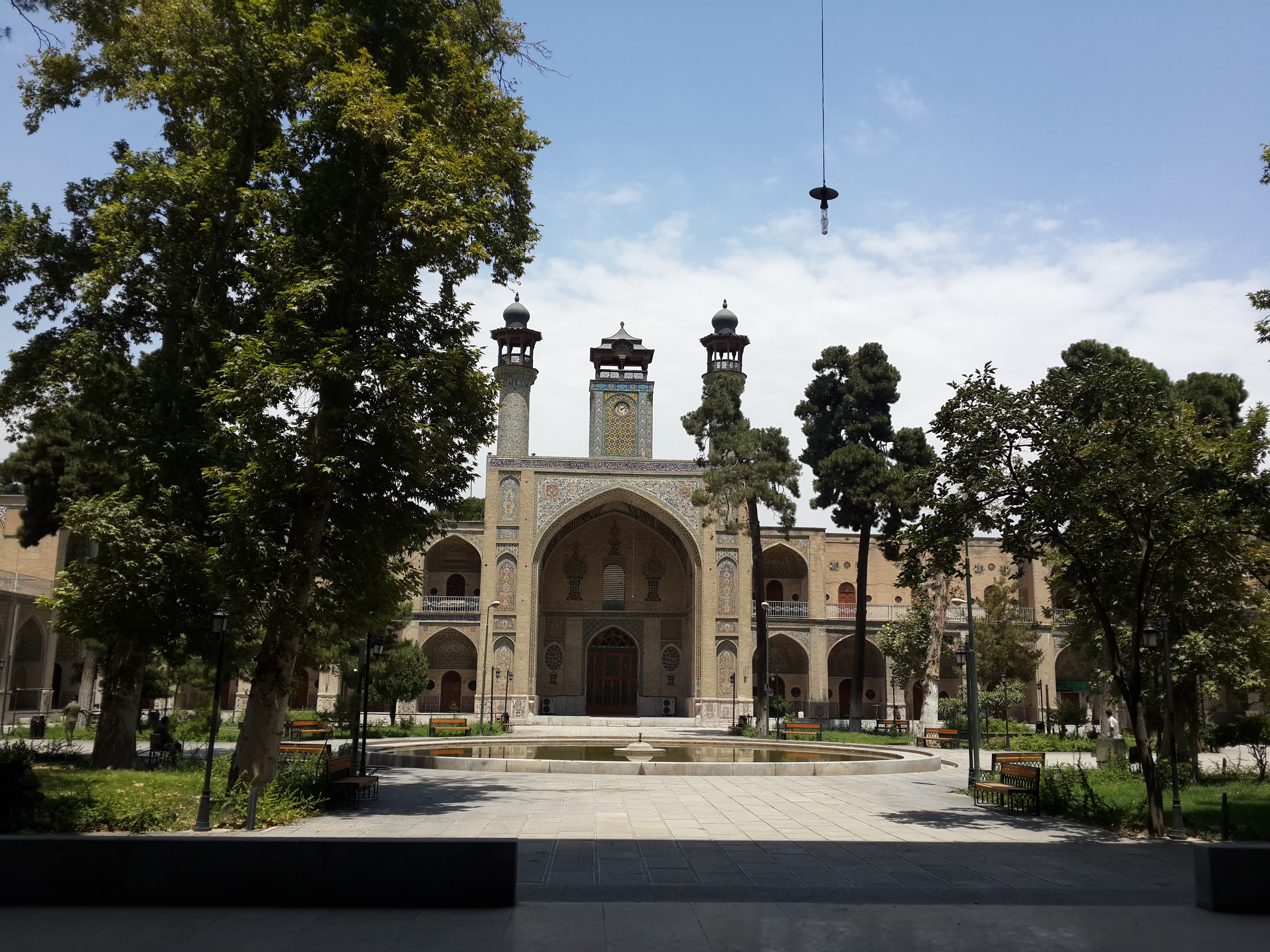
Sahn

== See also ==
- Shia Islam in Iran
- List of mosques in Iran
- Persian domes
