= Golchin Gilani =

Iranian poet

Majd-al-Din Mir-fakhra'i
- مجدالدین میرفخرایی
- Born: 1 January 1910; Rasht, Gilan province, Iran
- Died: 20 December 1972 (aged 62); London, England
- Resting place: London
- Occupation: Poet
- Spouse(s): Jalil-al-Sādāt; Irān-doḵt Meḡnāṭ; Šahin Jasuri Tabrizi
- Relatives: Houshang Ebtehaj (Cousin)
- Writing career
- Pen name: Golchin Gilani
- Language: Persian
- Genre: Poetry

Majd-al-Din Mir-fakhraʾi (Persian: مجدالدین میرفخرایی January 1, 1910 in Rasht – December 20, 1972 in London), better known by his pen name Golchin Gilani (Persian: گلچین گیلانی), was an Iranian poet.

== Biography ==
His birth name is pronounced as "Majdoddin." His father, Sayyed Mahdi Mir-fakhraʾi, was a Governor of Sabzevar County and Qom County. Majd-al-Din went through primary school in his hometown and high school in Tehran. After getting his bachelor's degree, he moved to England, earned an MD, and spent the rest of his life in England.

In the 1940s, Gilani worked as a translator for the British Broadcasting Corporation, as well as writing, translating, and recording newsreel narration for Movietone News. Majd-al-Din specialized in Tropical Medicine and Infectious Diseases. He died in London on December 20, 1972, and is buried in Putney Vale Cemetery in Southwest London (Block U, number 28) .

== The Rain ==
The Rain (Persian: باران, Bārān), published in 1944, is arguably his most famous poem and one of the best-known works of modern Persian poetry. It is a narrative poem about a day in the poet's childhood spent in the forests of Gilan. In the first half of the poem the weather is clear, while in the second half it suddenly begins to rain. The poem means to teach children that despite the weather, which is a metaphor for the person's state of life, the forest, which is a metaphor for life itself, is beautiful.
