= Kazem Hassibi =

Member of the Parliament
- In office 27 April 1952 – 16 August 1953
- Constituency: Tehran

Personal details
- Born: October 1906 Tehran, Iran
- Died: 28 October 1990 (aged 83–84) Tehran, Iran
- Party: Iran Party
- Other political affiliations: National Front
- Occupation: Engineer

Kazem Hassibi (Hasibi) (Persian: کاظم حسیبی) (born Tehran, October 1906 – died Tehran, October 28, 1990) was an Iranian academic, parliamentarian, National Front leader, and oil adviser to Prime Minister Mohammad Mosaddegh during Iran's oil nationalization movement.

After his education in France, Hassibi served a stint in the military. In 1941, he began teaching at the University of Tehran in the Faculty of Engineering and also co-founded the Engineer's Association (Kānun-e mohandesin), which would eventually become the Iran Party (Ḥezb-e Irān) and merge into the National Front (Jebhe Melli Irân). Politically active on issues related to oil, he became Deputy Minister of Finance under Mosaddegh and, in 1951, a member of the House of Parliament. During this time, he was regarded as the chief oil expert in Iran. He was a strong proponent of nationalization of the Anglo-Iranian Oil Company and refused to take part in the mediation talks between Iran and the British led by W. Averell Harriman in Tehran in July 1951. He did take part in those spearheaded by Richard Stokes the following month. After the 1953 Iranian coup d'état unseated Mosaddegh, Hassibi was imprisoned along with other important members of the National Front. After his release, he remained politically active with the National Front.

Hassibi was the son of a prominent bazaar merchant who had been sent to France by Reza Shah where he attended Ecole Polytechnique and Ecole des Mines, and read physics and geophysics.
