= 1907 in Iran =

- Decades
- See also: Other events of 1907; Years in Iran

The following lists events that have happened in 1907 in the Qajar dynasty.

== Incumbents ==
- Monarch: Mozaffar al-Din Shah Qajar (until January 3), Mohammad Ali Shah Qajar (starting January 3)
- Prime Minister:
  - until March 7: Nasrullah Moshir al-Dowleh
  - March 7-March 17: vacant
  - March 17-April 29: Soltan-Ali Vazir-e Afkham
  - April 29-May 4: vacant
  - May 4-August 31: Ali-Asghar Khan Atabak
  - August 31-September 16: vacant
  - September 16-October 27: Ahmad Moshir al-Saltaneh
  - October 27-December 21: Abolqasem Naser al-Molk
  - starting December 21: Hossein-Qoli Nezam al-Saltaneh Mafi

== Events ==
- January 8 – Mohammad Ali Shah Qajar ascended to the crown.
- August – an Anglo-Russian agreement divided Iran into two zones of interests: a Russian zone in the North and a British zone in the South.
- October 7 – The Persian Constitutional Amendment of 1907 is signed by Mohammad Ali Shah Qajar.

== Death ==
- January 3 – Mozaffar ad-Din Shah Qajar died in Tehran at the age of 53.
