= Hosein Lorzade =

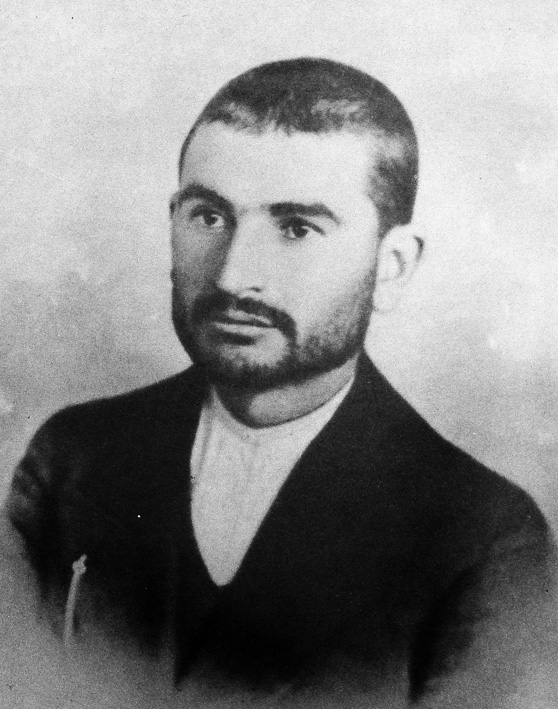
- Hosein Lorzade in 1936
- Born: Hosein ebn-e Mohammad Lorzade; 1906; Tehran, Iran
- Died: 14 September 2004 (aged 97–98); Tehran, Iran
- Occupation: Architect
- Awards: Medal of Ferdowsi (1934), First Order of Homayun (1950)

Hosein ebn-e Mohammad Lorzade (Persian: حسین ابن محمد لرزاده; c. 1906 - 14 September 2004) was an Iranian traditional architect/mimar. He is credited for building a large number of mosques (approximately 864), palaces and other buildings. His most notable works include: the Tomb of Ferdowsi, parts of Sepahsalar Mosque, various buildings in Sa'dabad Complex, sections of Imam Husayn Shrine in Karbala and many more. He was a known for his knowledge of variant traditional Persian architecture ornaments, such as Kaseh-sazi.

== Biography ==
Lorzadeh was born in 1906 in Tehran. His father, Master Mohammad, was one of the renowned architects of his time and was a colleague of Haj Hassan Sani’ al-Divan. He studied under Master Mirza Hassan as young child. He went on to study sculpture at the Kamal-ul-Molk High School, and continued his studies with Seyed Mohammad-Taqi Naqash Bashi.

His house was transformed into a museum in 2019.
