= Bersabe Hovsepyan-Snhchyan =

Iranian educator and school founder (1906–1999)

- برسابه هوسپیان-سنقچیان
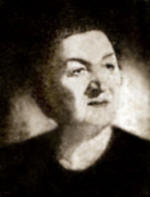
- Born: 1906; Isfahan, Sublime State of Iran
- Died: 1999 (aged 92–93); United States
- Other names: Bersabé Hovsepian, Bersaba Hospian, Bersabah Hospian
- Education: University of Geneva
- Occupations: Entrepreneur, educator, school founder

Bersabe Hovsepian (Armenian: Բերսաբե Հովսեփյան-Սնղչյան, Persian: برسابه هوسپیان-سنقچیان; 1906 – 1999), was an Iranian female entrepreneur, educator, and school founder, of Armenian origin. She studied educational sciences at the University of Geneva and established the first kindergarten in Iran in 1931 with an official certificate from the Ministry of Culture.

== Early life and education ==
She graduated from Haykazian Armenian School in Tehran in 1924, and taught in this school for some time. Between the years 1949 to 1951 she went to Geneva, Switzerland to complete her education and studied in the field of educational sciences and psychology of children and adolescents at the University of Geneva.

== Kadakestan Bersaba school ==
At the age of 18, she served as a teacher at the Bandar-e Anzali Armenian School in Bandar-e Anzali for one year. In 1930, she established her own kindergarten named "Kadakestan Bersaba". This educational institution was the first Iranian kindergarten that started working in Iran with the official permission of the then Ministry of Culture under the name "Kodakestan" and its teaching was in Persian language.

In 1959, Hovsepian established a primary school and a high school in the vicinity of this kindergarten.

== Iranian Women's Organization ==
In addition to educational activities, she was also active in social affairs and was one of the founders of Iran Women's Organization in 1966.

In recognition of Hovsepian's meritorious services in education, she has been honored to receive the second degree of "honor" from the Ministry of Education of Iran.

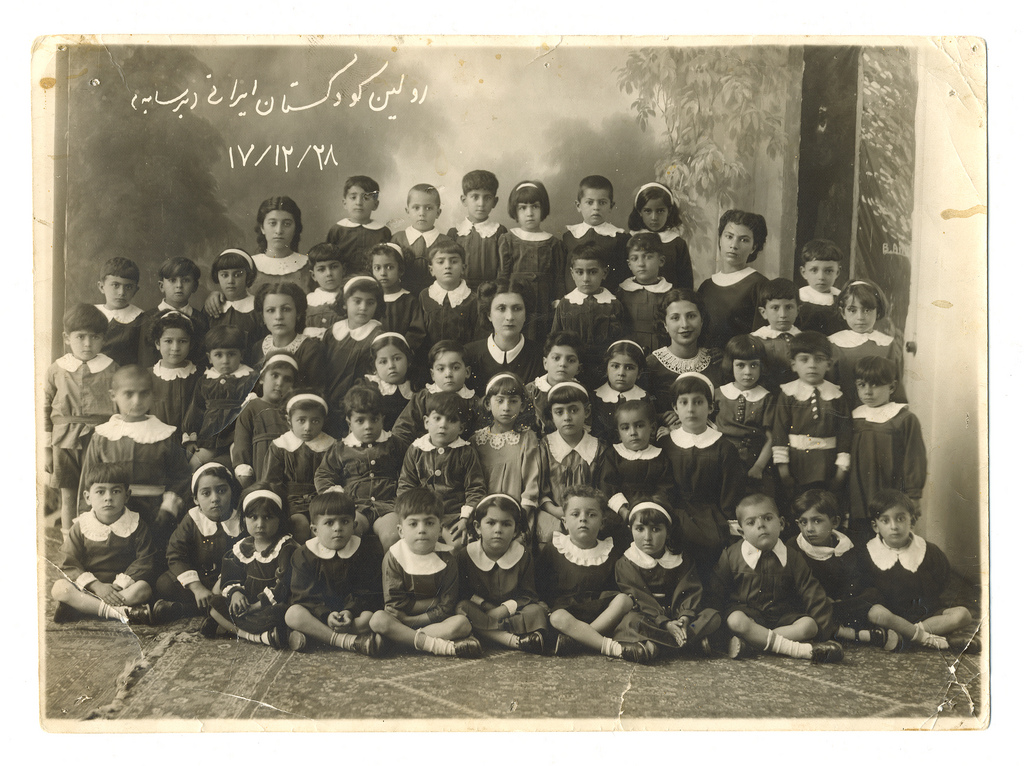
The first kindergarten in Iran (Kodakestan Bersaba)

== After the Iranian Revolution ==
Bersaba schools were closed after the 1979 Iranian Revolution. At the beginning of the Iran–Iraq War, Hovsepian established the headquarters of feeding, first aid, etc. in some neighborhoods of Tehran. The jobs of some of them in the south and west of the country caused a flood of war victims and homeless people to migrate to big cities like Tehran.

== Death and legacy ==
She spent the last years of her life in America, and died in 1999. After her death, an alley in Tehran bears her name in her honor.
