= Doctor Clayton Forrester =

Doctor Clayton Forrester may refer to:

- Doctor Clayton Forrester (War of the Worlds), lead character from the 1953 film War of the Worlds
- Dr. Clayton Forrester (Mystery Science Theater 3000), mad scientist from the television show Mystery Science Theater 3000
