= Mangaf =

Area in the Ahmadi Governorate of Kuwait

Mangaf المنقف
- Area
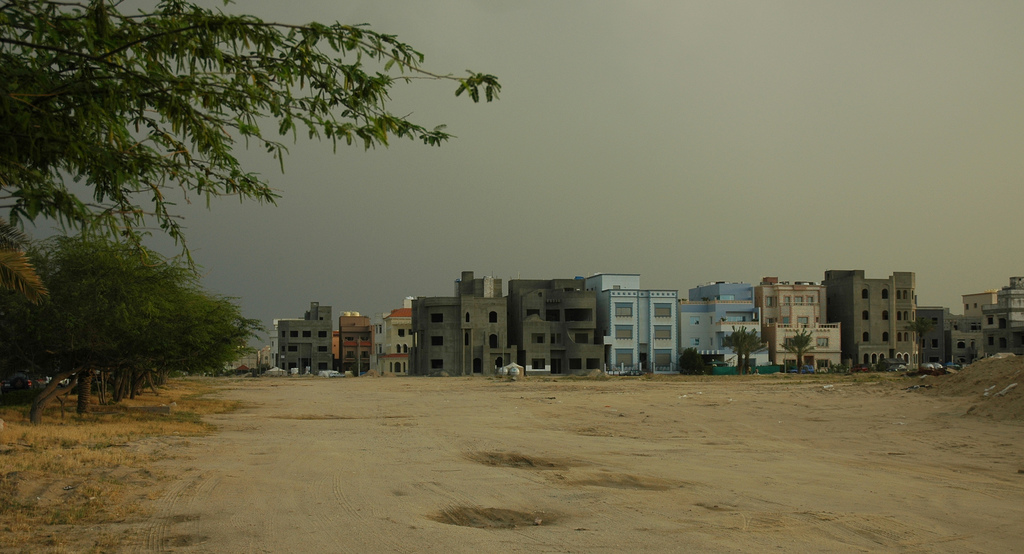
- Buildings in Mangaf

- Location within Kuwait Location within Persian Gulf Location within Asia
- Coordinates: 29°06′19″N 48°07′37″E
- Country: Kuwait
- Governorate: Ahmadi

Area
  - Total: 1.8 km^{2} (0.69 sq mi)
- Time zone: Arabian Standard Time

Mangaf (Arabic: المنقف) is an area of Kuwait in the Ahmadi Governorate, east of the town of Ahmadi, on the coast of the Persian Gulf and south of Kuwait City.

The area has a large concentration of shops and restaurants called Al Azeeziya including a link of the Sultan Center chain. A Hilton Resort occupies a waterfront position.

Tens of thousands of people live in Mangaf, mainly migrant workers from India, Bangladesh and Egypt, frequently in overcrowded apartment blocks, one of which burned in June 2024, killing 50 people.
