= Vahan Terpanchian =

- Born: 1912; Erzurum, Western Armenia, Ottoman Empire
- Died: 1998 (85–86); U.S.
- Occupations: Cinematographer, Laboratory Technician and Producer

Vahe Terpanchian (Armenian: վահան տէր Յազըճեան); 1912–1998) Iranian-Armenian Cinematographer, Laboratory Technician and Producer.

== Life ==
He was born in Erzurum, Western Armenia, Ottoman Empire, in 1912. After murder of his father during the Armenian genocide in Ottoman Empire, he fled to Syria at age of 3 with his mother. The mother and son eventually moved up to Iran and settled in Tehran. In 1938, Terpanchian set up photo Vahe shop on the "Naderi street" in Tehran after many years of work as a photographer. Vahan also created the first studio for processing and printing color photographs in Iran, and he deserves credit at the first person who printed color negative in the country. In 1951, he set up "Alborz Film Studio", with the collaboration of Simik Constantin, Aboldqasem Rezayi and Johny Baghdasarian. Terpanchian was the producer as well as the cinematographer of the first feature film made at Alborz Film Studio titled the White Gloves (1951) which was directed by Parviz Khatibi in 1951. The film, shot on 16 mm reversal stocks, was also the first talkie in the Iranian cinema. He also worked as cinematographer on the films Viva Auntie! and Second Life produced at Alborz Film two films titled Indiscretion and The Sinner. Terpanchian also shot the films One-Day Governor, Midway through Life and Fifth Marriage for other studios. Furthermore Photo vahe appears in the credit sequence of numerous films. Terpanchian to the U.S. 1973 and died in 1998.
