= Tayeb Hajrezaei =

Famous Iranian gangster

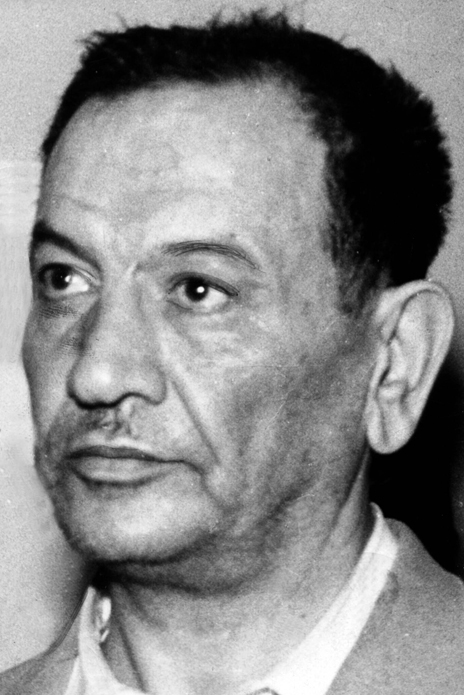
- Born: 1912; Tehran, Sublime State of Iran
- Died: 2 November 1963 (aged 51); Tehran, Imperial State of Iran
- Cause of death: Execution by firing squad
- Other name: Salar or Teyeb Khan
- Occupations: wholesale fruit importer and exporter
- Years active: 15 years

Tayeb Hajrezaei (Persian: طیب حاج‌رضایی; 1912 – 2 November 1963) was a traditional athlete of the Pahlavi era. He was also known as Javan Mard, Laat, and Looti. In 1953, he was a supporter of the Pahlavi dynasty during the 1953 Iranian coup d'état but later emerged as an opponent of Mohammad Reza Shah. After spending time in prison, he was executed by firing squad on 2 November 1963.

== Life ==
Tayeb was born in 1912 in the Sābūn Pāz Khāneh (commonly known as Sām Pāz Khāneh) neighborhood of Tehran. His father, Hossein Ali Hajrezaei, was from Avaj County and, after migrating to Tehran, worked for bakeries collecting dry twigs. Tayeb had three brothers named Haji Masih, Akbar, and Tahir. He had an early interest in traditional sports and gained recognition after completing his military service. From 1951 to 1963, Tayeb was involved in buying and selling fruits and vegetables. Throughout his life, he had two wives and seven children.

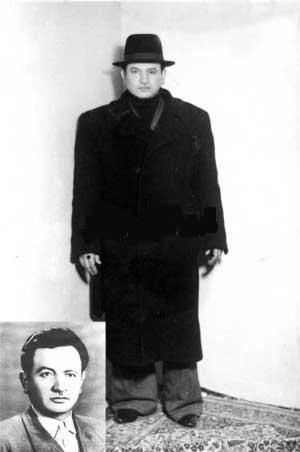
Tayeb Hajrezaei in his youth

Tayeb and his contemporaries engaged in ancient sports in places like Zurkhaneh Asghar Shater in the wheat warehouse near Shush Square, Zurkhaneh Reza Kashfi in Saadat Bazaar on Molavi Street, and Zurkhaneh in the Pachenar and Nizamabad neighborhoods. Additionally, they practiced in Zurkhaneh Shaban Jafari in City Park.

In his youth, Tayeb had several stints in prison due to involvement in various incidents, with some instances where he did not complete his sentence. His criminal record included:

- Two years of solitary confinement for clashing with the Shahrbani guards in 1937.
- Pursued for involvement in 1940, released on bail.
- Five years of imprisonment with shackles in 1943.
- Exile to Bandar Abbas in 1944 on charges of murder. He was found not guilty.

Tayeb is attributed with traits such as kindness, helping those who cannot defend themselves, and helping the needy. He was described as a religious person; he refrained from trimming his beard during the month of Muharram and wore black mourning attire while in mourning. Bijan Hajrezaei, Tayeb's son, spoke about his father's devotion to Husayn ibn Ali:

My father had a strange sensitivity and affection for the lineage of sanctity and purity, especially Imam Hossian. I truly say that he loved him; even in the face of my mother's objections about some of his expenditures, he would say, "I divide my life and the money I earn into two parts. I spend one part on myself, and the other part I either mourn for Imam Hossian or spend it in his way."

One of Tayeb's notable activities was leading a mourning procession during Tasu'a and Ashura, moving from the warehouse area towards the city center and receiving respect from neighborhood dignitaries such as Ali Kashani along the route.

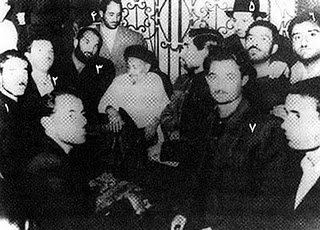
1. Hossein Alam 2. Tahir Hajrezaei 3. Shaban Jafari 4. Hossein Mehdi Kasab 5. Tayeb Hajrezaei 6. Akbar Hajrezaei 7. Seyyed Akbar Kharat next to Abol-Ghasem Kashani.

Tayeb and his associates did not directly participate in the 1953 Iranian coup d'état but joined in the afternoon after the coup's victory. His respect for the leaders of the uprising, who were the heads of the field, was a significant factor in his reluctance to directly cooperate with the Pahlavi court. After the 1953 coup, Tayeb gradually changed his stance on supporting the court. During the election of the head of the coffee makers' guild, he clashed with the supporters of the court, including Shaban Jafari. Tayeb prevented Shaban Jafari from being elected as the head of the guild instead of Ibrahim Karimi Abadi. The efforts of Seyyed Reza Zanjani, through two of Tayeb's friends, Hossein Kalantari and Ghasem Samavar Saz, helped to change Tayeb's opinion towards the court. In return, the court tried to influence Tayeb's opinion by offering him benefits, such as transferring the right to buy and sell Indian watermelons in exchange for a check for 1.5 million tomans. Due to unknown reasons, they executed the check, and he was sent to prison for 24 hours. The imprisonment for the check was one of the factors for Tayeb's discontentment with the court.

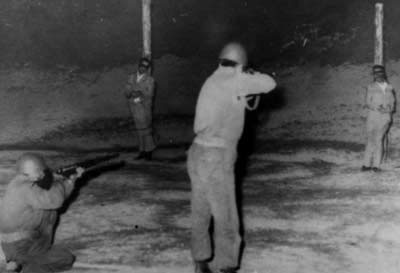
The scene of Tayeb Hajrezaei and Ismail Rezaei's execution.

== 1963 demonstrations and Tayeb's execution ==
The Pahlavi regime arrested Tayeb Haj Reza on 16 June 1963 during the 1963 demonstrations in Iran, along with 400 others, accusing them of disrupting public order. Tayeb Haj Reza and Ismail Rezaei were identified as the leaders of the arrested individuals. Ismail and Tayeb Haj Reza were sentenced to death by the Special Court No. 1, headed by Brigadier General Hossein Zamani and prosecuted by Colonel Ahmad Dolou Ghajar. After 13 trial sessions for criminal and treasonous activities aimed at disrupting public order and security on June 15, with the representation of Teamsar Shayanfar, they were sentenced to execution based on Article 70 of the General Penal Code. This verdict was carried out on the morning of 2 November 1963.

In his last will and testament, Tayeb stated that anyone making a claim for money after his death should be paid, and anyone who owed him, if they did not settle their debts, he forgave.

His wife, Fakhr al-Molouk Migrant Zanjani, died on 5 April 2015, in one of Tehran's hospitals.
