= Persian Constitutional Amendment of 1907 =

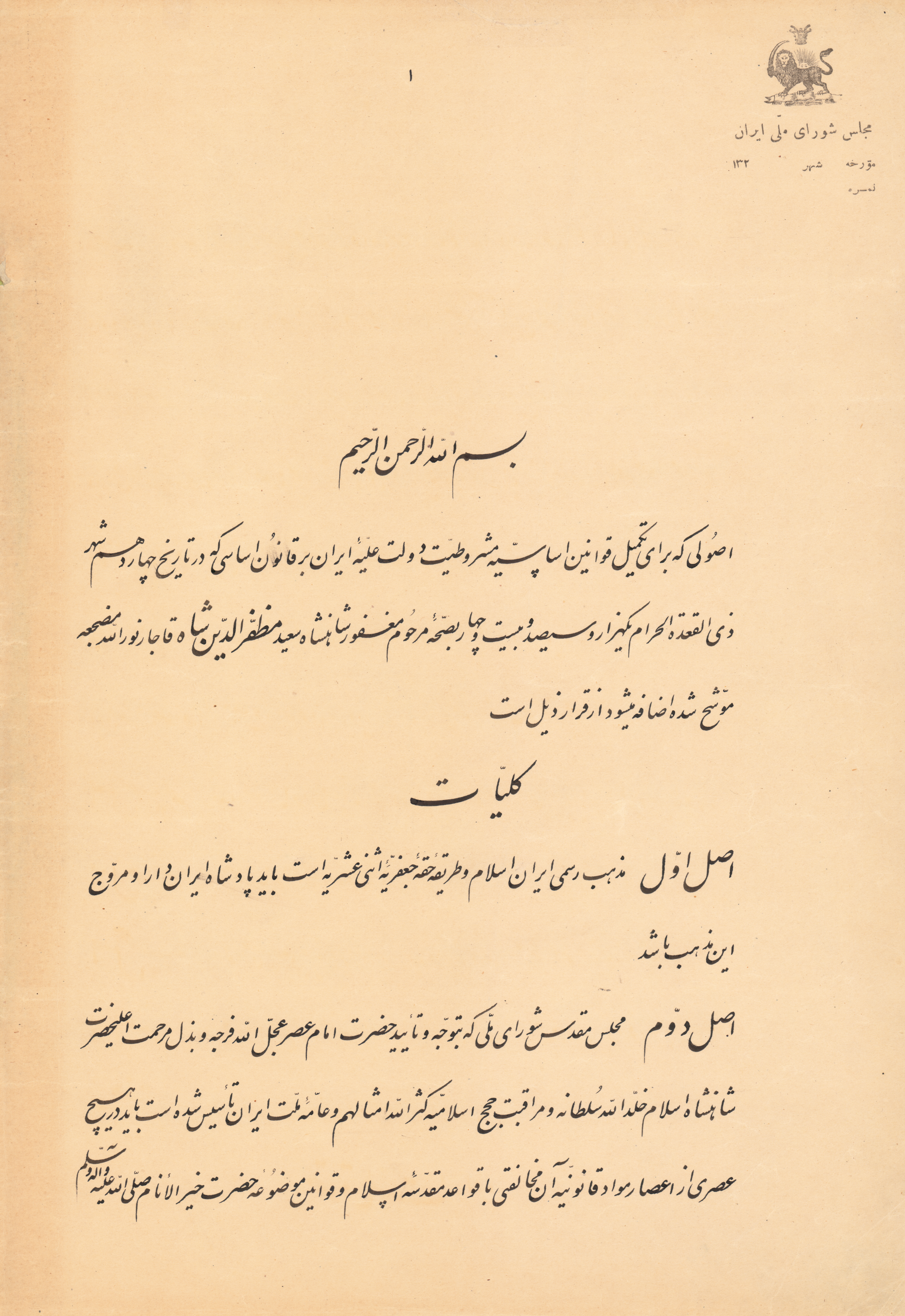
First page of the amendment text, declaring Twelver Shia Islam as the state religion.

The Persian Constitutional Amendment (Persian: متمم قانون اساسی) was a constitutional amendment in 107 articles that aimed to eliminate the shortcomings of the original Persian constitution that had occurred due to the hasty nature of its draft, fearing the looming death of Mozaffar ad-Din Shah Qajar who had agreed to limit his own powers, and the ascension to the throne of the anti-constitutionalist crown prince Mohammad Ali Mirza.

It was ratified by the first parliament and signed by Mohammad Ali Shah Qajar on 7 October 1907. The original text of the amendment is kept at the national library of Iran.

== History ==
In early 20th century, a series of protests forced Mozaffar ed-Din Shah Qajar to agree to the limiting of his powers which were previously absolute and adopt a more constitutional form of governance. However, the old Shah was sickly and his death would have resulted in his strictly anti-constitutionalist son reaching power. Therefore, the constitutionalists hastily drafted the text of the constitution so that they could present it to the dying shah before his departure. They also wrote it in a way to avoid offending the monarch as much as possible which resulted in many topics not being discussed clearly. Due to these, the original text of the constitution had many shortcomings.

The Shah died 5 days after signing the constitution and his son succeeded him on the Sun throne.

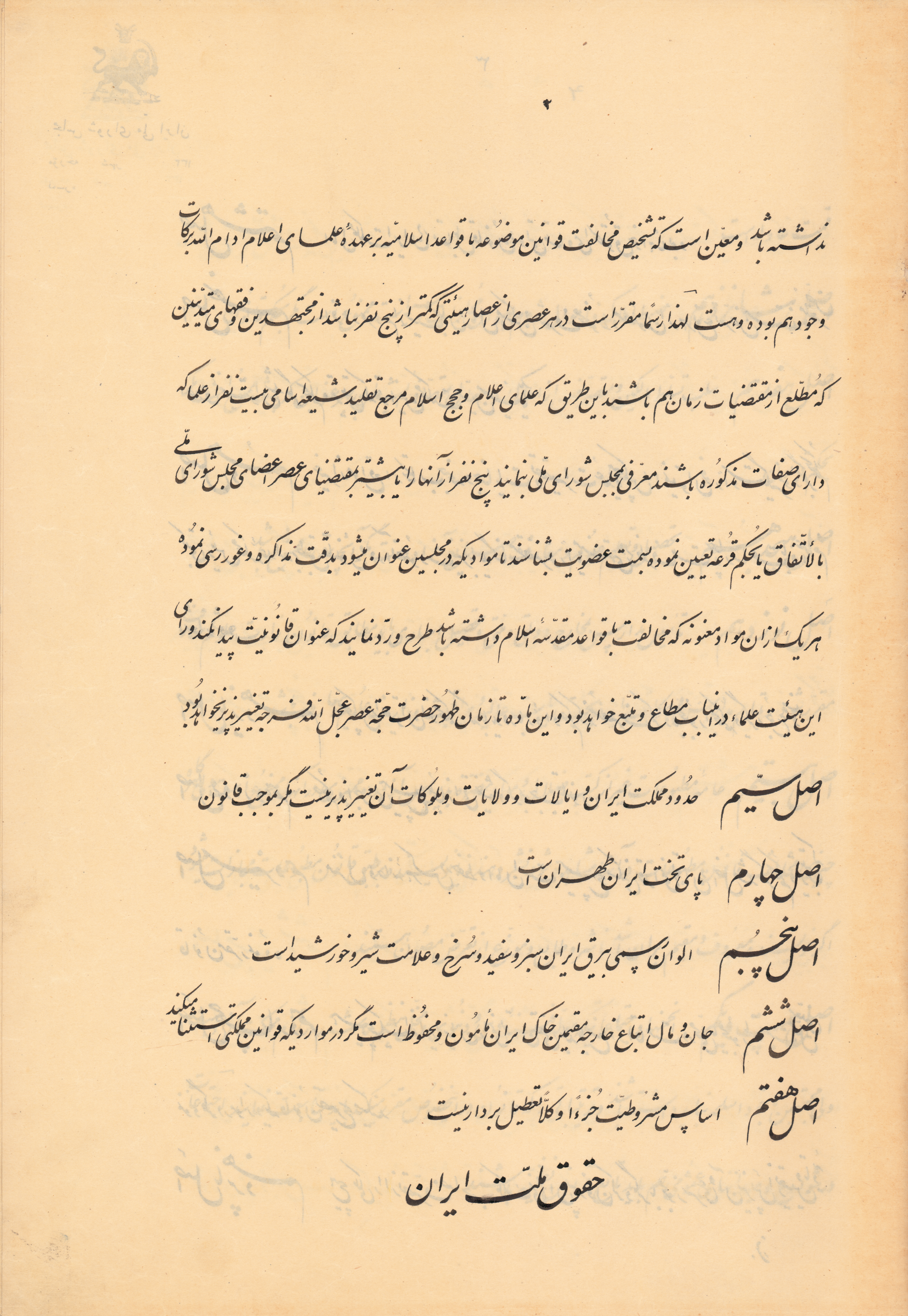
Second page of the amendment text

The constitutional amendment was then written to address the shortcomings of the constitution. Being based on the Belgian constitution, it would have limited the powers of the Shah severely and would have given the parliament more powers such as impeaching the incumbent prime minister and any of his ministers or powers over the military budget. It also declared in article 8 that all Iranians, including the Shah, are equal under the law, something the Shah could not accept. The Shah refused to sign it at first which was met with serious opposition from the people of Iran which forced him to sign the amendment on 7 October 1907.

The amendment only says that the laws must not be against Islam, but not that the laws have to be Islamic. Laws can indeed be un-Islamic and not be at variance with any specified Islamic law. The Constitutional Revolution had a role in suppressing the power that the clergy and the religion had. The Revolution gave rights to religious minorities such as Zoroastrians, Christians, and Jews.

== Content ==
=== General Dispositions ===
Article 1 and 2 of the laws, established Islam as the official religion of Persia/Iran, and specified that all laws of the nation must be approved by a committee of Shi'a clerics. Later, these two articles were mainly ignored during the Pahlavi era, which sometimes resulted in anger and uprising of clerics and religious masses: (See: Pahlavis and non-Islamic policies)

Articles 3-7 under the General Dispositions discuss the logistics of borders, flag specifications and Tehran as the capital of the country. They also elaborate on the property rights of foreign nationals in Iran as well as the inability to suspend the principles of the constitution.

=== Rights of the Iranian Nation ===
In the "Rights of the Iranian Nation," articles 8-25 discuss an array of rights inherent to all citizens of Iran. These rights include personal and property rights as well as freedom of expression and censorship. They briefly touch on the rights of citizenship and to move freely within the country.

=== Powers of the Realm ===
This section of the Supplementary Fundamental Laws of 7 October 1907 begins by stating the following:

The powers of the realm are all derived from the people; and the Fundamental Law regulates the employment of those powers.

Article 27 discussed the three categories that the power of the realm is divided into as:

First, the legislative power which is specially concerned with the making or amelioration of laws. This power is derived from His Imperial Majesty, the National Consultative Assembly, and the Senate, of which three sources each has the right to introduce laws, provided that the continuance thereof be dependent on their not being at variance with the standards of the ecclesiastical law, and on its approval by the Members of the two Assemblies, and the Royal ratification. The enacting and approval of laws connected with the revenue and expenditure of the kingdom are, however, specially assigned to the National Consultative Assembly. The explanation and interpretation of the laws are, moreover, amongst the special functions of the above-mentioned assembly.

Second, the judicial power, by which is meant the determining of rights. This power belongs exclusively to the ecclesiastical tribunals in matters connected with the ecclesiastical law, and to the civil tribunals in matters connected with ordinary law.

Third, the executive power, which appertains to the King, that is to say, the laws and ordinances are carried out by the Ministers and State officials in the august name of His Imperial Majesty in such manner as the Law Defines.

The remaining articles entail a permanent distinction between the three powers as well as their relativity in each province, department and district.

=== Rights of Members of the Assembly ===
This section includes the roles of the National Consultative Assembly and the Senate and the stipulations for membership within the two branches of government.

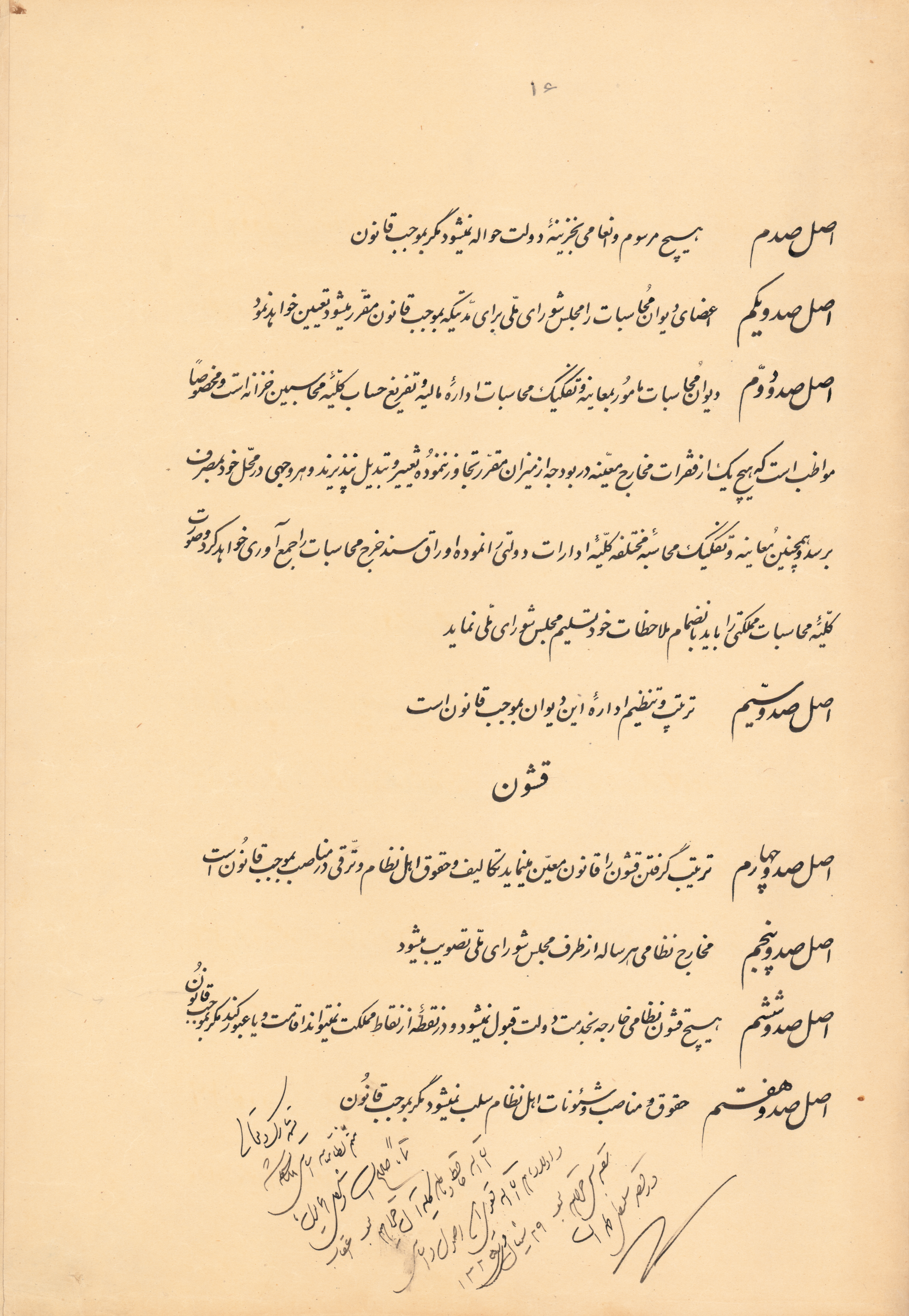
Last page of the amendment text.

=== Rights of the Persian Throne ===
In the Rights of the Persian Throne, the section begins with several articles outlining the duties of the Shah and the logistics of the throne. These include the process of succession to the throne, ascending to the throne and how to deal with instances issues like death.

It further discusses the duties of the Shah like the appointment and dismissal of Ministers and The granting of military rank, decoration and other honorary distinctions. The shah also commands the military and has the final say on whether or not to wage war.

This sections concludes in Article 57 by underlining the precise degree of power that the Shah obtains saying:

. The Royal prerogatives and powers are only those explicitly mentioned in the present Constitutional Law.

=== Concerning the Ministers ===
Articles 58-70 comment on the duties and laws regarding the Ministers. This section also helps to establish the specific roles that Ministers play in the government.

Several articles talk specifically about how Ministers are appointed as well as how they are held accountable for their delinquencies.

=== Powers of the Tribunal of Justice ===
This section begins by stating the purpose for the Ministry of Justice with article 71:

*ART. 71.

  - The Supreme Ministry of Justice and the judicial tribunals are the places officially destine for the redress of public grievances, while judgement in all matters falling within the scope of the Ecclesiastical Law is vested in just mujtahids possessing the necessary qualifications.

Articles 72-82 continue on to discuss the instructions for dealing with public disputes and inquiries as well as the legal aspects of carrying out justice in regards to law violations. Several articles explain the rules for all proceedings of tribunals declaring that they must be public and that all decisions must be based on reason and supported by proof in accordance to the law.

In articles 83–89, the issue of appointment is addressed and explained in regards to the Public Prosecutor and the members of the judicial tribunals, corroborating with the laws set forth.

=== Provincial and Departmental Councils (Anjumans) ===
The various Provincial and Departmental Councils are discussed in this section, establishing the special regulations for the different branches.

The fundamental laws regulating these assemblies includes the election of the members of the provincial and departmental councils, the supervision over all reforms connected with the public advantage, and duties of the expenditure for the individual councils.

=== Concerning the Finances ===
The regulations and management of finances is provided in articles 94–103. These articles include laws regarding taxes, tax exemptions, the set laws regarding the approval of the budget as well as the role of the Financial Commission.

The Financial Commission's role is:

to inspect and analyse the accounts of the Department of Finance and to liquidate the accounts of all debtors and creditors of the Treasury.

The section concludes with the idea that the institution and organization of the Financial Commission must be in accordance with the Law.

=== The Army ===
The last section of the Supplementary Fundamental Laws of 7 October 1907 is the Army. This sections outlines all elements of recruitment of troops, the duties and rights of the military, and the promotion of military personnel. It further discusses the budget of the military which is determined by the National Consultative Assembly each year, and rights regarding military personnel.

=== The Shah's statement ===
The amendment conclude with the following statements from the Shah:

"In the Name of God, blessed and exalted is He."

"The complementary provisions of the Fundamental Code of Laws have been perused and are correct. Please God, our Royal Person will observe and regard all of them. Our sons and successors also will, please God, confirm these sacred laws and principles.
