= Women Veterans Day =

Commemoration in the United States

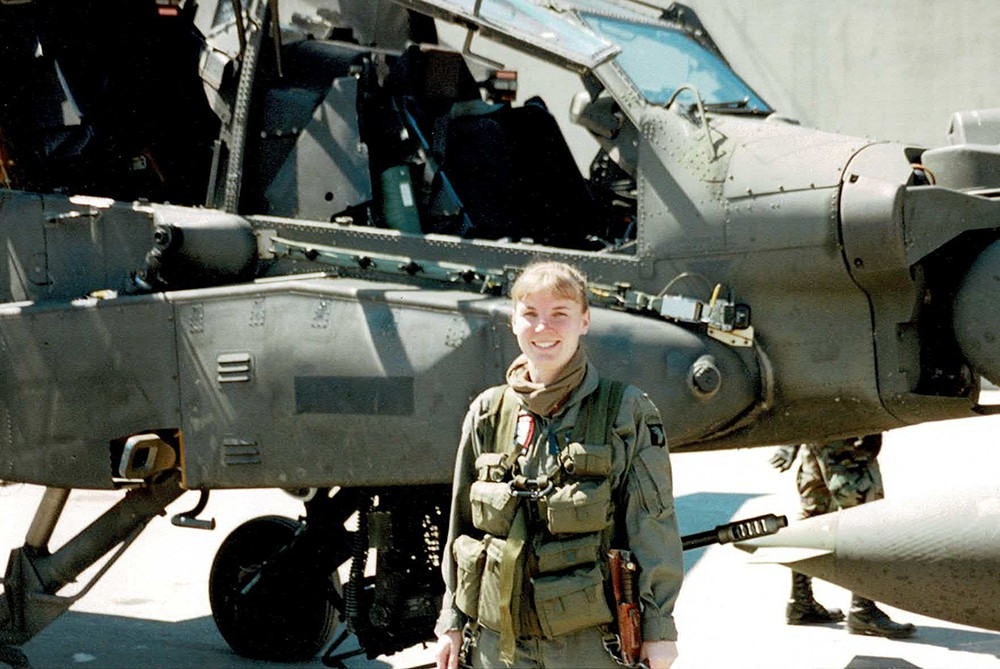
One of the US Army's first female AH-64 Apache combat helicopter pilots, Leslie Herlick

Women Veterans Day is observed on June 12 in the United States, a date chosen to mark the anniversary of the Women's Armed Services Integration Act. The date is not recognized nationally, but is recognized by a number of states, either through legislation or proclamation, and organizations. The stated goal of Women Veterans Day varies somewhat by state, but can generally be acknowledged as an effort to honor the work of women in the United States Armed Forces and recognize the unique challenges that they have faced. The date was first recognized when the New York State Assembly declared June 12, 2008, to be Women Veterans’ Recognition Day.

== National recognition ==
While Women Veterans Day is currently only a state recognized commemoration, there is an effort to have the day recognized at a national level. U.S. Representative Mikie Sherrill of New Jersey introduced a resolution in both 2019 and 2020 to have June 12 officially recognized as "Women Veterans Appreciation Day." The purpose of the resolution is to address "the disparities in care, recognition and benefits that our women veterans receive" and to "highlight the growing presence of women in the Armed Forces and the National Guard; and pay respect to women veterans for their dutiful military service." In 2020, Senator Cory Booker submitted a companion resolution in the U.S. Senate.

== State recognition ==
- California: Assembly Concurrent Resolution No. 33 was filed with on June 23, 2015, and designated June 12, 2015, as Woman Veterans Day. The bill's goal was to "urge all citizens to join in celebrating the many contributions of women to our military forces."
- Indiana: First recognized June 12 as Women Veterans Day in 2020.
- Kentucky: State Representative Patti Minter introduced House Bill 318 on in June 2020, calling on the state to designate the June 12th holiday. Governor Andy Beshear first recognized the holiday by proclamation in 2020.
- Michigan: Governor Gretchen Whitmer proclaimed June 12 as Women Veterans Recognition Day in 2019 in response to a Senate resolution.
- New Jersey: In 2019, the acting Governor of New Jersey, Lt. Governor Sheila Oliver, signed legislation to designate the annual recognition of June 12 as “Women Veterans Appreciation Day."
- New York: The State Assembly declared June 12, 2008, Women Veterans’ Recognition Day. Section 168-A of New York State law designates that Women Veterans Recognition Day will be recognized every year on June 12.
- Ohio: Senators, Sandra Williams and Frank Hoagland, both U.S. military veterans, introduced a bill in 2019 to designate June 12 as Woman Veterans Day. Governor Mike DeWine signed the bill into law on December 13, 2019, and the Ohio first celebrated the holiday on June 12, 2020.
- Oregon: Governor Kate Brown declared June 12, 2019 as Women Veterans Day for the first time in 2019.
- South Carolina: On June 12, 2019, South Carolina First Lady Peggy McMaster publicly read a proclamation declaring that the state recognized the day as Women Veterans Day, and Governor Henry McMaster issued another proclamation in 2020.
- Texas: State Representative Victoria Neave introduced House Bill 2698, which called for the designation of June 12 as Women Veterans Day. Governor Greg Abbott signed it into law on June 9, 2017.
- Tennessee: On May 17, 2021, Tennessee Gov. Bill Lee signed House Bill HB0504 / SB0390 to observe June 12 as "Women's Veterans Day."
- Virginia: Senate Joint Resolution No. 250 designating June 12, in 2025 and in each succeeding year, as Women Veterans Day in Virginia.
- Wisconsin: Governor Scott Walker signed a proclamation declaring June 12, 2018 Women Veterans Day and Governor Tony Evers continues to sign such proclamations through June 2020.
- Washington: Senate Resolution 8653, sponsored by State Senators Emily Randall and T'wina Nobles, was passed on February 17, 2022, recognizing June 12th as Women Veterans Day. State Governor Jay Inslee then issued a proclamation designating June 12, 2022 as Washington State's "very first Women Veterans Day."
