= 2009 Kuwait wedding fire =

Arson attack in Kuwait

Coordinates: 29.35°N 47.6833°E

- Nasara Yussef Mohammad al-Enzi
- Location: Oyoun, Kuwait
- Date: 15 August 2009; 9:20 pm (UTC+3)
- Attack type: Arson, mass murder
- Deaths: 57
- Injuries: 90
- Perpetrator: Nasra Yussef Mohammad al-Enezi

The 2009 Kuwait wedding fire was an arson attack that occurred during a wedding ceremony in Oyoun, Jahra Governorate, Kuwait on 15 August 2009.

== Arson attack ==
The groom's 23-year-old first wife, Nasra Yussef Mohammad al-Enezi, who was alleged to have exacted revenge for her husband taking a second wife, poured petrol on a tent where women and children were celebrating, setting it on fire. Within around three minutes, the whole tent, which had only one exit and did not meet fire safety regulations, was engulfed in flames, trapping many inside. It has been claimed that the temperature inside the tent exceeded 500 °C (932 °F).

== Victims ==
At least 57 people were killed and about 90 others wounded; it was the deadliest civilian disaster in Kuwait in the prior 40 years. Many of the bodies were burnt beyond recognition and had to be identified from DNA and dental records.

== Arrest ==
Nasra was arrested the following day and confessed. She was charged with premeditated murder, attempted murder, and arson. Her trial started in October 2009, during which she denied the charges, saying that she had confessed under duress due to threats. Nasra also claimed that she had lost a baby after she was given abortion pills by a prison employee related to her husband. In November 2009, Judge Adel al-Sager ordered her to undergo psychiatric tests after her defense lawyers claimed that she had suffered unspecified mental disorders when she was a child. He also agreed to summon her husband and her Asian maid. The two implicated her in starting the fire. Nasra later said that she poured "cursed water" onto the tent in a black magic ritual, but not gasoline.

In March 2010, Nasra was found guilty of 57 counts of premeditated murder and starting a fire with the intent to kill and sentenced to death. She was hanged at Central Prison on 25 January 2017 and was one of seven people executed in Kuwait that day.

== See also ==
- Happy Land fire - another act of arson committed by a jilted lover that killed innocent people
