= Malekeh Malekzadeh Bayani =

Iranian archaeologist and historian (1910–1999)

- ملکه ملک‌زاده بیانی
- Malekeh Malekzadeh Bayani
- Born: 1910
- Died: June 12, 1999 (aged 88–89)
- Citizenship: Iran
- Occupations: Numismatist; Archaeologist
- Known for: Head of the Coins, Seals and Tablets Department of the National Museum of Iran; Co-founder of Bank Sepeh Coin Museum

Malekeh Malekzadeh Bayani (Persian: ملکه ملک‌زاده بیانی, 1910 – 12 June 1999) was an Iranian archaeologist and numismatist, who was co-founder of the Bank Sepeh Coin Museum and was the Head of the Coins, Seals and Tablets Department of the National Museum of Iran. She was also a notable artist.

== Biography ==
Malekzadeh Bayani was the daughter of Mahdi Malekzadeh (fa), one of the founders of modern medical science in Iran and the author of the book History of Iran's Constitution, who was the grandson of Malik al-Mutaklamin (fa). She was also the granddaughter of Mirza Suleiman Khan Mikdeh (fa). She learned Iranian painting from Mirza Hadi Khan Tajveidi. She studied jointly at the Sorbonne and the Louvre University in Paris for a Masters in Archaeology and Numismatics.

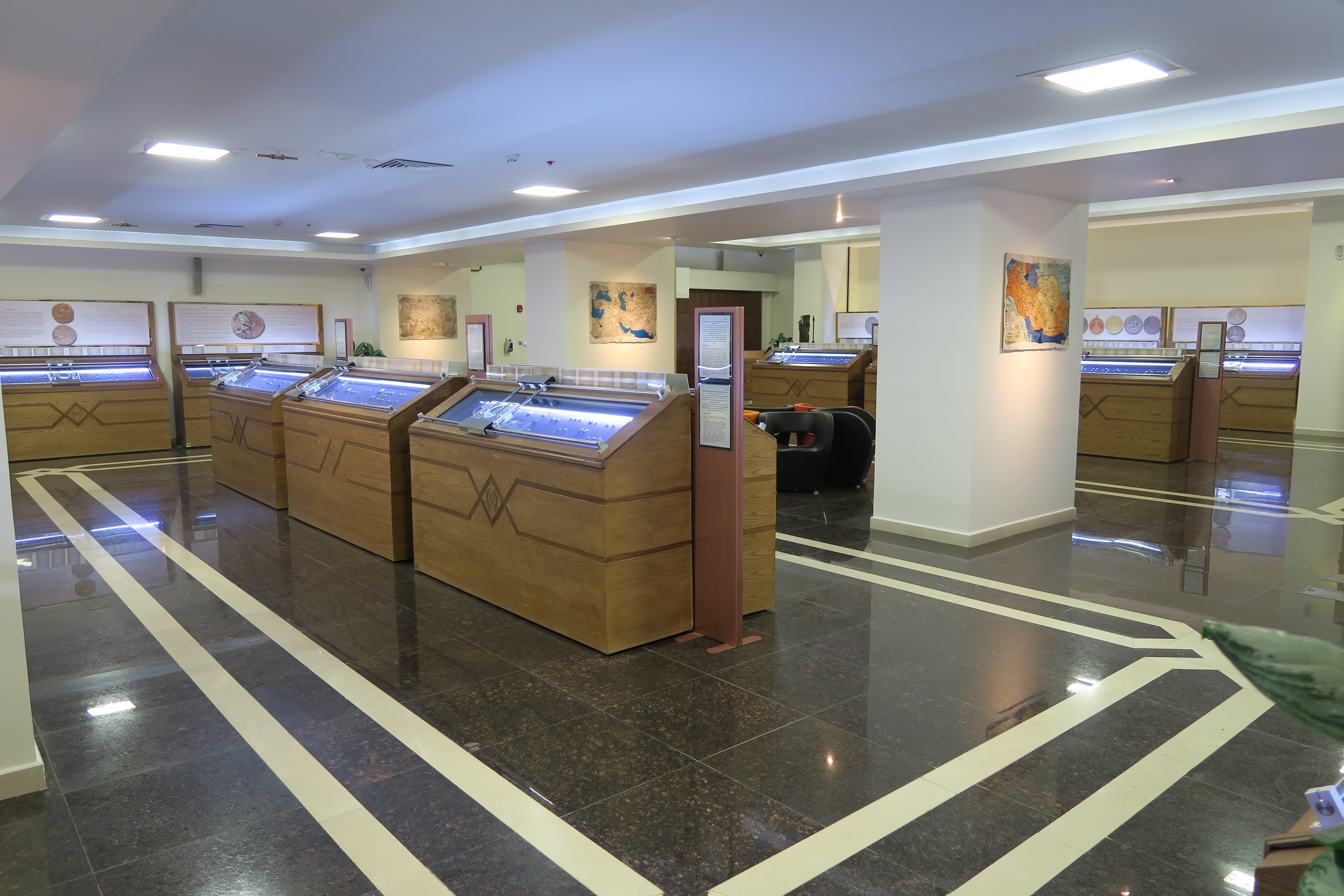
Bank Sepeh Coin Museum, interior

Returning to Iran after four years c. 1938, she was chosen as the Head of the Coins, Seals and Tablets Department of the National Museum of Iran and was an expert and member of the World Coin Association and UNESCO. She was co-founded the Bank Sepeh Coin Museum in Tehran. She also taught archaeology, numismatics and sigillography in the Department of Archaeology at Tehran University. She was fluent in French and English and was proficient in reading ancient languages. She worked on bullae from Kabudān tepe, and was able to identify their findspot. She also worked on seals from Ilam.

Malekzadeh Bayani died on 12 June 1999.

== Selected works ==
- Malekeh Malekzadeh Bayani, “Études sur quelques bulles sassanides,” in Akbar Tajvidi and Muhammad-Yusof Kiani, eds., The Memorial Volume of the Vth International Congress of Iranian Art and Ar-chaeology . . . 11th-18 April 1968, 2 vols., Tehran, 1972, I, pp. 218-21.
- Malekeh Malekzadeh Bayani, (1969). The reign of Pourandokht, the Sassanid Queen, and a study of the coins of her time. Journal of Historical Studies 4, 19-34. [Persian]
- Malekeh Malekzadeh Bayani. (2002) History of coins: from the oldest period to the Sassanid Period. Tehran: University of Tehran Press [ Persian]
