= 1911 in Iran =

- Decades
- See also: Other events of 1911; Years in Iran

The following lists events that have happened in 1911 in the Qajar dynasty in Iran.

== Incumbents ==
- Monarch: Ahmad Shah Qajar
- Prime Minister:
  - until March 12: Mostowfi ol-Mamalek
  - March 12-July 26: Mohammad Vali Khan Tonekaboni
  - starting July 26: Najaf-Qoli Khan Bakhtiari

== Events ==
- December 11 – Russian Invasion of Tabriz and two other northern cities of Iran begins.
