= 1908 in Iran =

- Decades
- See also: Other events of 1908; Years in Iran

The following lists events that have happened in 1908 in the Qajar dynasty in Iran.

== Incumbents ==
- Monarch: Mohammad Ali Shah Qajar
- Prime Minister:
  - until May 21: Hossein-Qoli Nezam al-Saltaneh Mafi
  - May 21-June 7: vacant
  - starting June 7: Ahmad Moshir al-Saltaneh

== Events ==
- June 23 – Mohammad Ali Shah Qajar exploited divisions with the ranks of the reformers to eliminate the Majlis. Vladimir Liakhov, a Russian Cossack Brigade commander, shelled Majlis and executed several leaders of Constitutional Movement.
- June - Siege of Astarabad
