= 1909 in Iran =

- Decades
- See also: Other events of 1909; Years in Iran

The following lists events that have happened in 1909 in the Qajar dynasty, Iran.

== Incumbents ==
- Monarch: Mohammad Ali Shah Qajar (until July 16), Ahmad Shah Qajar (starting July 16)
- Prime Minister:
  - until April 29: Ahmad Moshir al-Saltaneh
  - April 29-May 2: Kamran Mirza Nayeb al-Saltaneh
  - May 2-May 8: vacant
  - May 8-July 13: Javad Sa'd al-Dowleh
  - July 17-September 30: vacant
  - starting September 30: Mohammad Vali Khan Tonekaboni

== Events ==
- January 23 – The 7.3 M_{L} Borujerd earthquake affected central Iran with a maximum Mercalli intensity of IX (Violent), killing between 6,000–8000.
- July 16 – Ahmad Shah Qajar, the last king of Qajar dynasty, ascended to throne.
