= 2018–19 FC Arsenal Kyiv season =

FC Arsenal Kyiv
2018–19 season
- President: Ivica Pirić
- Manager: Fabrizio Ravanelli (until 22 September 2018); Vyacheslav Hroznyi (since 1 October 2018 – until 9 January 2019); Ihor Leonov (since 16 January 2019)
- Stadium: Valeriy Lobanovskyi Dynamo Stadium
- Ukrainian Premier League: 12th (relegated)
- Ukrainian Cup: Round of 32
- Top goalscorer: League: Vakulenko (7); All: Vakulenko (7)
Home colours	Away colours

The 2018–19 season was the first season in the top Ukrainian football league for FC Arsenal Kyiv since its reformation in 2014. Arsenal competed in the Premier League and the Ukrainian Cup.

== Players ==
=== Squad information ===
As of 31 May 2019

Squad no.	Name	Nationality	Position	Date of birth (age)
Goalkeepers
12	Orest Budyuk	(Ukraine)	GK	23 August 1995 (aged 23)
33	Dmytro Ivanov	(Ukraine)	GK	30 September 1989 (aged 29)
77	Roman Pidkivka	(Ukraine)	GK	22 July 1995 (aged 23)
96	Peyman Salehiserwak	(Iran)	GK	9 May 1996 (aged 23)
Defenders
2	Oleksandr Osman (on loan from Dynamo Kyiv)	(Ukraine)	DF	18 April 1996 (aged 23)
20	Dmytro Bashlay	(Ukraine)	MF	25 April 1990 (aged 29)
29	Maksym Zhychykov	(Ukraine)	MF	7 November 1992 (aged 26)
44	Danylo Sahutkin (on loan from Shakhtar Donetsk)	(Ukraine)	DF	19 April 1996 (aged 23)
74	Vladyslav Dubinchak ^{List B} (on loan from Dynamo Kyiv)	(Ukraine)	DF	10 July 1998 (aged 20)
79	Serhiy Vakulenko (on loan from Shakhtar Donetsk)	(Ukraine)	DF	7 September 1993 (aged 25)
Midfielders
4	Stefan Jevtoski	(North Macedonia)	MF	2 September 1997 (aged 21)
6	Andriy Stryzhak ^{List B}	(Ukraine)	MF	22 October 1999 (aged 19)
8	Serhiy Semenyuk	(Ukraine)	MF	27 January 1991 (aged 28)
9	Andriy Dombrovskyi	(Ukraine)	MF	12 August 1995 (aged 23)
11	Jaba Lipartia	(Georgia (country))	MF	16 November 1987 (aged 31)
13	Yuriy Vakulko ^{List B} (on loan from Partizan)	(Ukraine)	MF	10 November 1997 (aged 21)
16	Pavlo Orikhovskyi (on loan from Dynamo Kyiv)	(Ukraine)	MF	13 May 1996 (aged 23)
21	Vladyslav Kalitvintsev	(Ukraine)	MF	4 January 1993 (aged 26)
22	Artur Avahimyan ^{List B}	(Ukraine)	MF	16 January 1997 (aged 22)
23	Vyacheslav Tankovskyi (on loan from Shakhtar Donetsk)	(Ukraine)	DF	16 August 1995 (aged 23)
50	Volodymyr Doronin	(Ukraine)	MF	15 January 1993 (aged 26)
59	Artem Kozak ^{List B}	(Ukraine)	MF	28 May 1998 (aged 21)
78	Curtis Yebli ^{List B}	(France)	MF	30 March 1997 (aged 22)
91	Mykhailo Mudryk ^{List B} (on loan from Shakhtar Donetsk)	(Ukraine)	MF	5 January 2001 (aged 18)
94	Alireza Akbari	(Iran)	MF	2 March 1994 (aged 25)
99	Denys Yanakov ^{List B} (on loan from Dynamo Kyiv)	(Ukraine)	DF	1 January 1999 (aged 20)
	Orkhan Ibadov ^{List B}	(Ukraine)	MF	20 June 1998 (aged 20)
Forwards
7	Gegham Kadymyan	(Armenia)	FW	19 October 1992 (aged 26)
10	Denys Balanyuk ^{List B} (on loan from Wisła Kraków)	(Ukraine)	FW	16 January 1997 (aged 22)
15	Danyil Sukhoruchko ^{List B}	(Ukraine)	FW	21 February 2000 (aged 19)
19	Oleksandr Kovpak	(Ukraine)	FW	2 February 1983 (aged 36)
27	Gaëtan Missi Mezu	(Gabon) (France)	FW	4 May 1996 (aged 23)
71	Vladyslav Semotyuk ^{List B}	(Ukraine)	FW	14 November 2000 (aged 18)
98	Vladyslav Alekseyev ^{List B} (on loan from Dynamo Kyiv)	(Ukraine)	DF	29 April 1998 (aged 21)

== Transfers ==
=== In ===
Date	Pos.	Player	Age	Moving from	Type	Fee	Source
Summer
20 June 2018	GK	(Ukraine) Orest Budyuk	22	(Ukraine) Cherkaskyi Dnipro	Transfer	€0,026m	
19 July 2018	DF	(Argentina) Oscar Piris	29	(Argentina) Mitre	Transfer	Undisclosed	
19 July 2018	DF	(Croatia) Ivan Borna Jelić Balta	25	(Croatia) Varaždin	Transfer	Undisclosed	
19 July 2018	DF	(Serbia) Marko Nikolić	20	(Serbia) Inđija	Transfer	Undisclosed	
19 July 2018	MF	(North Macedonia) Stefan Jevtoski	20	(Croatia) Varaždin	Transfer	Undisclosed	
19 July 2018	MF	(Democratic Republic of the Congo) Aurélien Ngeyitala	24	(Slovakia) FC Nitra	Transfer	Undisclosed	
20 July 2018	DF	(Ukraine) Oleksandr Nasonov	26	(Ukraine) FC Mariupol	Transfer	Free	
20 July 2018	MF	(Ukraine) Volodymyr Doronin	25	(Ukraine) Olimpik Donetsk	Transfer	Free	
7 August 2018	MF	(France) Curtis Yebli	21	(Italy) Bari	Transfer	Free	
10 August 2018	DF	(Ukraine) Danylo Karas	21	(Ukraine) Dynamo Kyiv	Transfer / Loan ?	Undisclosed	
3 September 2018	MF	(Ukraine) Maksym Pryadun	21	(Ukraine) Zirka Kropyvnytskyi	Transfer	Undisclosed	
18 October 2018	MF	(Ukraine) Leonid Akulinin	25	(Ukraine) Karpaty Lviv	Transfer	Free	
1 November 2018	DF	(Ukraine) Serge Akakpo	31	Unattached	Transfer	Free	
1 November 2018	DF	(Ukraine) Oleksiy Larin	24	(Bulgaria) Dunav Ruse	Transfer	Free	
1 November 2018	MF	(Ukraine) Artem Kozak	20	(Greece) PAOK	Transfer	Free	
15 June 2018	DF	(Ukraine) Danylo Sahutkin	22	(Ukraine) Shakhtar Donetsk	Loan		
1 July 2018	FW	(Ukraine) Denys Balanyuk	21	(Poland) Wisła Kraków	Loan		
19 July 2018	DF	(Ukraine) Vladyslav Dubinchak	20	(Ukraine) Dynamo Kyiv	Loan		
19 July 2018	MF	(Ukraine) Pavlo Orikhovskyi	22	(Ukraine) Dynamo Kyiv	Loan		
19 July 2018	MF	(Ukraine) Denys Yanakov	19	(Ukraine) Dynamo Kyiv	Loan		
19 July 2018	FW	(Ukraine) Vladyslav Alekseyev	20	(Ukraine) Dynamo Kyiv	Loan		
3 September 2018	MF	(Ukraine) Yuriy Vakulko	20	(Serbia) Partizan	Loan		
3 September 2018	FW	(Italy) Massimo N'Cede Goh	19	(Italy) Juventus	Loan		
Winter
22 February 2019	GK	(Ukraine) Roman Pidkivka	23	(Ukraine) Karpaty Lviv	Transfer	Free	
22 February 2019	GK	(Iran) Peyman Salehiserwak	22	?	Transfer	?	
22 February 2019	DF	(Ukraine) Dmytro Bashlay	28	(Ukraine) SC Dnipro-1	Transfer	Undisclosed	
22 February 2019	DF	(Ukraine) Maksym Zhychykov	26	(Finland) Kokkolan Palloveikot	Transfer	Undisclosed	
22 February 2019	MF	(Georgia (country)) Jaba Lipartia	31	(Georgia (country)) FC Samtredia	Transfer	Undisclosed	
22 February 2019	FW	(Armenia) Gegham Kadymyan	26	(Ukraine) Vorskla Poltava	Transfer	Free	
22 February 2019	FW	(Ukraine) Oleksandr Kovpak	36	(Ukraine) Desna Chernihiv	Transfer	Free	
1 March 2019	MF	(Iran) Alireza Akbari	25	?	Transfer	Free	
1 March 2019	MF	(Ukraine) Artur Avahimyan	22	(Ukraine) FC Mariupol	Transfer	Free	
1 March 2019	MF	(Ukraine) Vladyslav Kalitvintsev	26	(Ukraine) Dynamo Kyiv	Transfer	Free	
1 March 2019	MF	(Gabon) Gaëtan Missi Mezu	22	(Romania) Dunărea Călărași	Transfer	Free	
22 February 2019	DF	(Ukraine) Serhiy Vakulenko	25	(Ukraine) Shakhtar Donetsk	Loan		
1 March 2019	MF	(Ukraine) Mykhailo Mudryk	18	(Ukraine) Shakhtar Donetsk	Loan		
22 February 2019	DF	(Ukraine) Vyacheslav Tankovskyi	23	(Ukraine) Shakhtar Donetsk	Loan / Transfer ?		

=== Out ===
Date	Pos.	Player	Age	Moving to	Type	Fee	Source
Summer
July 2018	FW	(Ukraine) Oleksandr Shevchenko	25	(Ukraine) Enerhiya Nova Kakhovka	Transfer	Undisclosed	
1 July 2018	FW	(Argentina) Diego Ezequiel Aguirre	25	(Latvia) Spartaks Jūrmala	Transfer	Undisclosed	
1 July 2018	DF	(Ukraine) Ivan Trubochkin	25	(Ukraine) Chornomorets Odesa	Transfer	Undisclosed	
13 July 2018	MF	(Ukraine) Artem Starhorodskyi	36	(Belarus) FC Vitebsk	Transfer	Free	
18 July 2018	FW	(Ukraine) Oleksandr Batalskyi	31	(Ukraine) Rukh Vynnyky	Transfer	Free	
19 July 2018	DF	(Ukraine) Dzhemal Kyzylatesh	24	(Ukraine) Kolos Kovalivka	Transfer	Undisclosed	
21 July 2018	MF	(Ukraine) Valeriy Kucherov	24	(Ukraine) FC Kalush	Transfer	Free	
1 August 2018	DF	(Ukraine) Navid Nasimi	23	(Ukraine) Chaika Petropavlivska Borshchahivka	Transfer	Free	
2 August 2018	MF	(Ukraine) Maksym Borovets	26	(Ukraine) Veres Rivne	Transfer	Free	
9 August 2018	DF	(Ukraine) Andriy Derkach	33	(Belarus) Dnepr Mogilev	Transfer	Free	
30 August 2018	DF	(Ukraine) Kyrylo Matveyev	22	(Ukraine) FC Mariupol	Transfer	Free	
4 September 2018	MF	(Ukraine) Vadym Semchuk	24	(Ukraine) Polissya Zhytomyr	Transfer	Free	
20 September 2018	MF	(Ukraine) Ruslan Chernenko	25	(Ukraine) Ahrobiznes Volochysk	Transfer	Free	
18 November 2018	DF	(Croatia) Ivan Borna Jelić Balta	25	Unattached	Transfer	Free	
18 November 2018	DF	(Serbia) Marko Nikolić	20	Unattached	Transfer	Free	
Winter
1 January 2019	DF	(Ukraine) Danylo Karas	22	Unattached	Transfer	Free	
1 January 2019	MF	(Ukraine) Serhiy Datsenko	31	Unattached	Transfer	Free	
1 January 2019	MF	(Ukraine) Maksym Pryadun	21	Unattached	Transfer	Free	
1 January 2019	FW	(Ukraine) Leonid Akulinin	25	Unattached	Transfer	Free	
23 January 2019	DF	(Argentina) Oscar Piris	28	(Uruguay) Torque	Transfer	Undisclosed	
31 January 2019	DF	(Togo) Serge Akakpo	31	(Turkey) Elazığspor	Transfer	Free	
January 2019	DF	(Ukraine) Oleksiy Larin	24	(Tajikistan) Istiklol	Transfer	Free	
2 February 2019	DF	(Ukraine) Oleksiy Maydanevych	27	(Georgia (country)) Shevardeni-1906 Tbilisi	Transfer	Free	
2 February 2019	MF	(Ukraine) Oleksandr Yermachenko	26	(Georgia (country)) Shevardeni-1906 Tbilisi	Transfer	Free	
4 February 2019	MF	(Ukraine) Yuriy Bushman	28	(Lithuania) Kauno Žalgiris	Transfer	Free	
13 February 2019	FW	(Ukraine) Maksym Feshchuk	33	(Belarus) FC Vitebsk	Transfer	Free	
20 February 2019	DF	(Ukraine) Oleksandr Nasonov	26	(Ukraine) FC Lviv	Transfer	Free	
28 February 2019	DF	(Ukraine) Dmytro Zozulya	30	(Ukraine) Hirnyk-Sport Horishni Plavni	Transfer	Free	
7 March 2019	MF	(Democratic Republic of the Congo) Aurélien Ngeyitala	24	(Bulgaria) Vereya Stara Zagora	Transfer	Free	
21 March 2019	GK	(Ukraine) Serhiy Sitalo	32	(Ukraine) Kolos Kovalivka	Transfer	Free	
31 December 2018	MF	(Ukraine) Serhiy Hryn	24	(Ukraine) Shakhtar Donetsk	Loan return		
31 December 2018	FW	(Italy) Massimo N'Cede Goh	19	(Italy) Juventus	Loan return		

== Pre-season and friendlies ==
22 June 2018 Friendly	Volyn Lutsk	2–1	Arsenal Kyiv	Lutsk
16:00 EEST (UTC+03:00)	Yakovlyev 22' (pen.), 44' (pen.)	Report	56'	Stadium: Avanhard Stadium

30 June 2018 Friendly	Arsenal Kyiv	1–1	Nyva-V Vinnytsia	Shchaslyve
13:00 EEST (UTC+03:00)	Goal	Report	Goal

30 June 2018 Friendly	Arsenal Kyiv	0–0	Cherkaskyi Dnipro	Shchaslyve
17:00 EEST (UTC+03:00)		Report

14 July 2018 Friendly	Arsenal Kyiv	0–2	Kolos Kovalivka	Shchaslyve
18:00 EEST (UTC+03:00)		Report	Havrysh 9'; Ilyin 47'	Attendance: 100

3 October 2018 Friendly	Arsenal Kyiv	0–1	Ukraine U-21	Shchaslyve
16:00 EEST (UTC+03:00)		Report	Boryachuk 29'	Attendance: 50

11 October 2018 Friendly	Shakhtar Donetsk	3–0	Arsenal Kyiv	Kyiv
EEST (UTC+03:00)	Fernando 11'; Moraes 14' (pen.); Maycon 45'	Report		Stadium: Svyatoshyn Olympic Base

13 October 2018 Friendly	Dynamo Kyiv	0–1	Arsenal Kyiv	Kyiv
12:00 EEST (UTC+03:00)		Report	Akulinin 36'	Stadium: Dynamo Training Center; Attendance: 80

28 January 2019 Friendly	Arsenal Kyiv	2–2	(Serbia) Vojvodina	Turkey
EET (UTC+02:00)	Avahimyan 60'; Alekseyev 88'	[ Report]	Đurić 5'; Devetak 83'

29 January 2019 Friendly	Arsenal Kyiv	0–3	(Slovakia) Spartak Trnava	Turkey
EET (UTC+02:00)		[ Report]

1 February 2019 Friendly	Arsenal Kyiv	0–0	(Serbia) Bačka Bačka Palanka	Turkey
EET (UTC+02:00)		[ Report]

3 February 2019 Friendly	Arsenal Kyiv	0–1	(Serbia) Dinamo Vranje	Turkey
EET (UTC+02:00)		[ Report]

5 February 2019 Friendly	Arsenal Kyiv	1–1	(Slovakia) Železiarne Podbrezová	Turkey
EET (UTC+02:00)	75'	[ Report]	78'

8 February 2019 Friendly	Arsenal Kyiv	0–1	(Bosnia and Herzegovina) Borac Banja Luka	Turkey
EET (UTC+02:00)		[ Report]	Vranješ 41'

11 February 2019 Friendly	Arsenal Kyiv	0–2	(Kazakhstan) Zhetysu	Turkey
EET (UTC+02:00)		[ Report]

17 February 2019 Friendly	Arsenal Kyiv	2–1	(Georgia (country)) Dinamo Batumi	Turkey
EET (UTC+02:00)	Kovpak	[ Report]

== Competitions ==
=== Overall ===
Competition	First match	Last match	Starting round	Final position	Record							
Competition	First match	Last match	Starting round	Final position	Pld	W	D	L	GF	GA	GD	Win %
Premier League	22 July 2018	29 May 2019	Matchday 1	12th	32	7	5	20	26	56	−30	21.88
Cup	26 September 2018	26 September 2018	Round of 32 (1/16)	Round of 32 (1/16)	1	0	0	1	2	3	−1	0.00
Total					33	7	5	21	28	59	−31	21.21

Last updated: 31 May 2019
Source: Competitions

=== Premier League ===
==== League table ====
Pos	Team	Pld	W	D	L	GF	GA	GD	Pts	Qualification or relegation
8	Desna Chernihiv	32	12	5	15	35	41	−6	41	
9	Olimpik Donetsk	32	7	13	12	41	48	−7	34	
10	Karpaty Lviv (O)	32	8	9	15	44	53	−9	33	Qualification for the Relegation play-offs
11	Chornomorets Odesa (R)	32	8	7	17	31	49	−18	31	Qualification for the Relegation play-offs
12	Arsenal Kyiv (R, X)	32	7	5	20	26	56	−30	26	Relegated and later withdrawn

Source: Ukrainian Premier League (in Ukrainian), UEFA, Soccerway
Rules for classification: 1) Points; 2) Head-to-head points; 3) Head-to-head goal difference; 4) Head-to-head higher number of goals scored; 5) Goal difference; 6) Higher number of goals scored; 7) Draw or "golden match" if tied for title (Article 22, paragraph 3).
(O) Play-off winners; (R) Relegated; (X) Withdrew

Teams that placed 10th and 11th in the 2018–19 Ukrainian Premier League play two-leg play-off with the second and third teams of the 2018–19 Ukrainian First League. The draw for play-offs took place on 24 May 2019 and the games will be played on 4 and 8 June 2019.

Team 1	Agg.	Team 2	1st leg	2nd leg
Chornomorets Odesa	0 – 2	Kolos Kovalivka	0 – 0	0 – 2
Karpaty Lviv	3 – 1	Volyn Lutsk	0 – 0	3 – 1

=== First leg ===
4 June 2019
19:00 UTC+3

Chornomorets Odesa	0 – 0	Kolos Kovalivka
	Report

Chornomorets Stadium, Odesa
Attendance: 5,435
Referee: Anatoliy Abdula (Kharkiv)

4 June 2019
19:00 UTC+3

Karpaty Lviv	0 – 0	Volyn Lutsk
	Report

Ukraina Stadium, Lviv
Attendance: 10,104
Referee: Denys Shurman (Vyshneve)

=== Second leg ===
8 June 2019
17:00 UTC+3

Kolos Kovalivka	2 – 0	Chornomorets Odesa
Havrysh 57', 63' (pen.)	Report

Kolos Stadium, Kovalivka
Attendance: 2,500
Referee: Vitaliy Romanov

Kolos Kovalivka won 2–0 on aggregate and were promoted to the 2019–20 Ukrainian Premier League. Chornomorets Odesa were relegated to the 2019–20 Ukrainian First League

8 June 2019
19:00 UTC+3

Volyn Lutsk	0 – 3 ~~1 – 3~~	Karpaty Lviv
Kozhanov 42'	Report	Klyots 37'; Ponde 82' (pen.); Miroshnichenko 90+5'

Avanhard Stadium, Lutsk
Attendance: 5,200
Referee: Maksym Kozyryatskyi

Karpaty Lviv won 3–0 on aggregate and retained their spot in the 2019–20 Ukrainian Premier League. Volyn Lutsk remained in the 2019–20 Ukrainian First League

Due to fan violence at the game and attack on referee, the original score 1–3 was scratched and replaced with technical score 0–3 loss to Volyn and win for Karpaty. Additionally, the Lutsk department of police started criminal proceedings on the fact of intentional damage to property during the game by the Karpaty fans.

==== Results summary ====
Overall								Home						Away					
Pld	W	D	L	GF	GA	GD	Pts	W	D	L	GF	GA	GD	W	D	L	GF	GA	GD
32	7	5	20	26	56	−30	26	2	5	9	15	32	−17	5	0	11	11	24	−13

Last updated: 31 May 2019.
Source: Competitive matches

==== Results by round ====
Round	1	2	3	4	5	6	7	8	9	10	11	12	13	14	15	16	17	18	19	20	21	22	23	24	25	26	27	28	29	30	31	32
Ground	H	A	H	A	H	A	H	A	H	H	A	A	H	A	H	A	H	A	H	A	A	H	A	H	A	H	A	H	A	H	A	H
Result	L	L	L	L	D	W	L	L	L	L	W	L	L	L	L	L	D	L	L	W	L	D	W	W	L	W	W	D	L	D	L	L
Position	10	12	12	12	12	12	12	12	12	12	12	12	12	12	12	12	12	12	12	12	12	12	12	11	11	11	11	11	11	11	12	12

Updated to match(es) played on 31 May 2019. Source: Competitive matches
A = Away; H = Home; W = Win; D = Draw; L = Loss

==== Matches ====
22 July 2018 1	Arsenal Kyiv	0–2	FC Lviv	Kyiv
19:30 EEST (UTC+03:00)	Jelić Balta (yellow card) 22'; Piris (yellow card) 62'; Dombrovskyi (yellow card) 87'	Report	Voronin 29'; Zapadnya (yellow card) 42'; Holikov 50', (yellow card) 56'; Pryimak (yellow card) 61'	Stadium: Dynamo Stadium; Attendance: 2,430; Referee: Oleksandr Derdo

29 July 2018 2	Shakhtar Donetsk	3–0	Arsenal Kyiv	Kharkiv
19:30 EEST (UTC+03:00)	Moraes 10'; Fernando 32'; Taison 37'	Report	Jelić Balta (yellow card) 17'; Jevtoski (yellow card) 49'; Nikolić (yellow card) 78'	Stadium: OSC Metalist; Attendance: 6,541; Referee: Vitaliy Romanov

5 August 2018 3	Arsenal Kyiv	1–2	FC Mariupol	Kyiv
19:30 EEST (UTC+03:00)	Ngeyitala 22'; Nikolić (yellow card) 35'	Report	Fomin 36' (pen.); Boryachuk 44'; Pikhalyonok (yellow card) 58'	Stadium: Dynamo Stadium; Attendance: 1,620; Referee: Dmytro Bondarenko

12 August 2018 4	FC Oleksandriya	1–0	Arsenal Kyiv	Oleksandriya
17:00 EEST (UTC+03:00)	Zaporozhan (yellow card) 26'; Shendrik (yellow card) 34'; Tsurikov 58'; Ponomar (yellow card) 84'; Dovhyi (yellow card) 89'	Report	Yebli (yellow card) 48'; Orikhovskyi (yellow card) 66'; Piris (yellow card) 89'	Stadium: CSC Nika Stadium; Attendance: 2,460; Referee: Dmytro Kryvushkin

17 August 2018 5	Arsenal Kyiv	1–1	Chornomorets Odesa	Kyiv
19:00 EEST (UTC+03:00)	Maydanevych 26', (yellow card) 73'; Dubinchak (yellow card) 27'; Yebli (yellow card) 56'; Orikhovskyi (yellow card) 85'; Dombrovskyi (yellow card) 90' (yellow-red card) 90+1'	Report	Litovchenko (yellow card) 26'; Chorniy (yellow card) 33'; Babenko 35'; Romanyuk (yellow card) 61'	Stadium: Dynamo Stadium; Attendance: 987; Referee: Ihor Paskhal

26 August 2018 6	Karpaty Lviv	1–2	Arsenal Kyiv	Lviv
19:30 EEST (UTC+03:00)	Miroshnichenko (yellow card) 24'; Mehremić (yellow card) 40'; Erbes 55'	Report	Orikhovskyi 28', (yellow card) 29'; Hryn 39'; Jevtoski (yellow card) 41'; Dubinchak (yellow card) 51'; Sitalo (yellow card) 80'; Piris (red card) 84'; Sahutkin (yellow card) 89'	Stadium: Ukraina Stadium; Attendance: 1,525; Referee: Viktor Kopiyevskyi

2 September 2018 7	Arsenal Kyiv	0–5	Zorya Luhansk	Kyiv
19:30 EEST (UTC+03:00)	Orikhovskyi (yellow card) 63'	Report	Karavayev 5'; Khomchenovskyi 13', 68'; Rafael Ratão 43'; Lyednyev 51'	Stadium: Dynamo Stadium; Attendance: 2,211; Referee: Yuriy Mozharovskyi

14 September 2018 8	Desna Chernihiv	1–0	Arsenal Kyiv	Chernihiv
19:00 EEST (UTC+03:00)	Artem Favorov 8'; Filippov (yellow card) 46'; Volkov (yellow card) 90+3'	Report	Datsenko (yellow card) 68'	Stadium: Chernihiv Stadium; Attendance: 3,274; Referee: Kostiantyn Trukhanov

22 September 2018 9	Arsenal Kyiv	1–3	Olimpik Donetsk	Kyiv
19:30 EEST (UTC+03:00)	Piris (yellow card) 20'; Dubinchak (yellow card) 45+1'; Hryn 59', (yellow card) 89'; Maydanevych (yellow card) 80'	Report	Vakulenko 16'; Zubeyko (yellow card) 28'; Dehtyarev (yellow card) 53', (goal) 82'; Hryshko 64'	Stadium: Dynamo Stadium; Attendance: 820; Referee: Maksym Bondarenko

30 September 2018 10	Arsenal Kyiv	0–1	Dynamo Kyiv	Kyiv
19:30 EEST (UTC+03:00)	Dombrovskyi (yellow card) 18'; Sahutkin (yellow card) 64'; Karas (yellow card) 64'; Jevtoski (yellow card) 88'; Semenyuk (yellow card) 90+8'	Report	Burda (yellow card) 33'; Duelund 35'; Bushchan (red card) 52'; Shabanov (red card) 75'; Morozyuk (yellow card) 88'; Besyedin (yellow card) 90+4'	Stadium: Dynamo Stadium; Attendance: 6,360; Referee: Mykola Balakin

7 October 2018 11	Vorskla Poltava	0–2	Arsenal Kyiv	Poltava
19:30 EEST (UTC+03:00)	Chyzhov (yellow card) 35'	Report	Sahutkin (yellow card) 31'; Jevtoski (yellow card) 38'; Maydanevych (yellow card) 48'; Hryn 72', 79'	Stadium: Vorskla Stadium; Attendance: 1,444; Referee: Viktor Kopiyevskyi

21 October 2018 12	FC Lviv	1–0	Arsenal Kyiv	Lviv
14:00 EEST (UTC+03:00)	Bruno Duarte (yellow card) 31' (yellow-red card) 65', (goal) 36'	Report	Sahutkin (yellow card) 58'; Dubinchak (yellow card) 64'; Ngeyitala (yellow card) 67' (yellow-red card) 74'; Vakulko (yellow card) 75'; Sitalo (yellow card) 90'	Stadium: Arena Lviv; Attendance: 1,465; Referee: Kostiantyn Trukhanov

27 October 2018 13	Arsenal Kyiv	0–3	Shakhtar Donetsk	Kyiv
17:00 EEST (UTC+03:00)	Jevtoski (yellow card) 40'; Osman (yellow card) 45+1'; Zozulya (yellow card) 62'; Maydanevych (yellow card) 66'	Report	Alan Patrick 45'; Bolbat 55'; Khocholava (yellow card) 59'; Kovalenko 63' (pen.)	Stadium: Dynamo Stadium; Attendance: 2,315; Referee: Ihor Paskhal

3 November 2018 14	FC Mariupol	1–0	Arsenal Kyiv	Mariupol
14:00 EET (UTC+02:00)	Fedorchuk (yellow card) 19'; Vakula 81'	Report	Dubinchak (yellow card) 25'; Ngeyitala (yellow card) 36'; Yermachenko (yellow card) 44'	Stadium: Volodymyr Boiko Stadium; Attendance: 2,200; Referee: Viktor Kopiyevskyi

10 November 2018 15	Arsenal Kyiv	0–3	FC Oleksandriya	Kyiv
19:30 EET (UTC+02:00)	Dubinchak (yellow card) 23'; Jevtoski (yellow card) 38'	Report	Shastal 33'; Shendrik (yellow card) 61'; Sitalo 82'; Kovalets 90+1'	Stadium: Dynamo Stadium; Attendance: 632; Referee: Anatoliy Abdula

25 November 2018 16	Chornomorets Odesa	2–1	Arsenal Kyiv	Odesa
17:00 EET (UTC+02:00)	Koval (yellow card) 36', (goal) 69'; Savchenko (yellow card) 49'; Musolitin 67'	Report	Dubinchak (yellow card) 16'; Semenyuk 62'; Balanyuk (yellow card) 77'	Stadium: Chornomorets Stadium; Attendance: 2,750; Referee: Yuriy Mozharovskyi

1 December 2018 17	Arsenal Kyiv	1–1	Karpaty Lviv	Kyiv
17:00 EET (UTC+02:00)	Papa Gueye 24' (o.g.); Jevtoski (yellow card) 62'; Akulinin (yellow card) 71'	Report	Erbes (yellow card) 15'; Papa Gueye (yellow card) 50'; Miroshnichenko (yellow card) 51'; Fedetskyi (yellow card) 62'; Hutsulyak 73' (pen.); Klyots (yellow card) 84'	Stadium: Dynamo Stadium; Attendance: 232; Referee: Kateryna Monzul

8 December 2018 18	Zorya Luhansk	3–0	Arsenal Kyiv	Zaporizhia
14:00 EET (UTC+02:00)	Karavayev 36' (pen.); Hromov 51'; Kamenyuka 80'	Report	Zozulya (yellow card) 35'	Stadium: Slavutych-Arena; Attendance: 1,576; Referee: Dmytro Panchyshyn

24 February 2019 19	Arsenal Kyiv	0–2	Desna Chernihiv	Kyiv
14:00 EET (UTC+02:00)	Semenyuk (yellow card) 32'; Tankovskyi (yellow card) 62'; Bashlay (yellow card) 86'; Orikhovskyi (yellow card) 90'	Report	Denys Favorov 1'; Filippov (yellow card) 54'; Bohdanov (yellow card) 68'; Artem Favorov 90+1' (pen.)	Stadium: Dynamo Stadium; Attendance: 525; Referee: Oleksandr Derdo

3 March 2019 20	Olimpik Donetsk	0–1	Arsenal Kyiv	Kyiv
14:00 EET (UTC+02:00)	Tsymbalyuk (yellow card) 10'; Shynder (yellow card) 39'; Hennadiy Pasich (yellow card) 69'; Ksyonz (yellow card) 77'; Gai (yellow card) 85'; Dehtyarev (yellow card) 90+3'	Report	Vakulenko 10' (pen.), (yellow card) 12'; Bashlay (yellow card) 26' (yellow-red card) 35'	Stadium: Dynamo Stadium; Attendance: 420; Referee: Dmytro Kryvushkin

10 March 2019 21	Dynamo Kyiv	4–0	Arsenal Kyiv	Kyiv
17:00 EET (UTC+02:00)	Harmash (yellow card) 20', (goal) 28', 39'; Sidcley 37'; Tsyhankov 45' (pen.); Mykolenko (yellow card) 82'	Report	Avahimyan (yellow card) 58'; Stryzhak (yellow card) 81'; Sahutkin (yellow card) 83'; Zhychykov (yellow card) 83'	Stadium: NSC Olimpiyskiy; Attendance: 7,686; Referee: Yevhen Aranovskyi

18 March 2019 22	Arsenal Kyiv	2–2	Vorskla Poltava	Kyiv
17:00 EET (UTC+02:00)	Vakulenko 8', 90' (pen.); Kadymyan (yellow card) 54'; Pidkivka (yellow card) 90+3'	Report	Sharpar 24' (pen.), 56' (pen.); Kolomoyets (yellow card) 55'; Giorgadze (yellow card) 56'; Perduta (yellow card) 83'; Rebenok (yellow card) 90+2'	Stadium: Dynamo Stadium; Attendance: 732; Referee: Maksym Kozyryatskyi

6 April 2019 23	Chornomorets Odesa	1–3	Arsenal Kyiv	Odesa
17:00 EEST (UTC+03:00)	Morozenko (yellow card) 23'; Pavlov (yellow card) 32'; Ryzhuk (yellow card) 45+1'; Chorniy 62'; Babenko (yellow card) 87'	Report	Missi Mezu 5'; Vakulenko 26' (pen.); Orikhovskyi 37'; Avahimyan (yellow card) 47'; Tankovskyi (yellow card) 54'; Kadymyan (yellow card) 76'; Zhychykov (yellow card) 87'	Stadium: Chornomorets Stadium; Attendance: 4,251; Referee: Yuriy Ivanov

14 April 2019 24	Arsenal Kyiv	1–0	Vorskla Poltava	Kyiv
17:00 EEST (UTC+03:00)	Kadymyan (yellow card) 31'; Dombrovskyi (yellow card) 35'; Kalitvintsev 58'; Tankovskyi (yellow card) 79'	Report	Perduta (yellow card) 37'; Chesnakov (yellow card) 43'; Sapay (yellow card) 57' (yellow-red card) 82'; Petrović (yellow card) 59'; Mysyk (yellow card) 80'	Stadium: Dynamo Stadium; Attendance: 490; Referee: Viktor Kopiyevskyi

23 April 2019 25	Olimpik Donetsk	2–0	Arsenal Kyiv	Kyiv
17:00 EEST (UTC+03:00)	Gai 37' (pen.); Dehtyarev 44'	Report	Tankovskyi (yellow card) 19'; Dubinchak (yellow card) 58'	Stadium: Dynamo Stadium; Attendance: 258; Referee: Dmytro Kryvushkin

29 April 2019 26	Arsenal Kyiv	2–0	Desna Chernihiv	Kyiv
17:00 EEST (UTC+03:00)	Avahimyan 11'; Orikhovskyi 27' (pen.)	Report	Slinkin (yellow card) 26'; Imerekov (yellow card) 30'; Ohirya (yellow card) 40'; Filippov (yellow card) 55'	Stadium: Dynamo Stadium; Attendance: 307; Referee: Yuriy Mozharovskyi

5 May 2019 27	Karpaty Lviv	1–2	Arsenal Kyiv	Lviv
17:00 EEST (UTC+03:00)	Yoda (yellow card) 11'; Shved (yellow card) 11' (yellow-red card) 45+3'; Di Franco (yellow card) 45'; Hongla 82'; Mehremić (yellow card) 90+5'	Report	Vakulenko 10'; Tankovskyi (yellow card) 45'; Bashlay (yellow card) 45+4'; Orikhovskyi (yellow card) 72'; Kovpak 74'	Stadium: Ukraina Stadium; Attendance: 1,650; Referee: Oleksandr Omelchenko

12 May 2019 28	Arsenal Kyiv	3–3	Chornomorets Odesa	Kyiv
14:00 EEST (UTC+03:00)	Orikhovskyi (yellow card) 9'; Dubinchak (yellow card) 18'; Vakulenko 57' (pen.), 77'; Lipartia (yellow card) 83'; Zhychykov (yellow card) 87'; Kovpak 88'	Report	Vilhjálmsson 10' (pen.); Koval (yellow card) 18'; Arzhanov (yellow card) 24' (yellow-red card) 45+1'; Semeniv 62'; Babenko 90+1' (pen.)	Stadium: Dynamo Stadium; Attendance: 693; Referee: Viktor Kopiyevskyi

18 May 2019 29	Vorskla Poltava	2–0	Arsenal Kyiv	Poltava
14:00 EEST (UTC+03:00)	Kolomoyets 6'; Vasin (yellow card) 41', (goal) 58'; Sklyar (yellow card) 63'	Report	Tankovskyi (yellow card) 21'; Vakulenko (yellow card) 50'	Stadium: Vorskla Stadium; Attendance: 1,307; Referee: Yaroslav Kozyk

21 May 2019 30	Arsenal Kyiv	1–1	Olimpik Donetsk	Kyiv
19:30 EEST (UTC+03:00)	Tankovskyi 31'; Dubinchak (yellow card) 68'; Kalitvintsev (yellow card) 75'; Bashlay (yellow card) 86'	Report	Dieye 25'; Hennadiy Pasich (yellow card) 52' (yellow-red card) 54'; Klymenchuk (yellow card) 61'	Stadium: Dynamo Stadium; Attendance: 341; Referee: Yuriy Mozharovskyi

25 May 2019 31	Desna Chernihiv	1–0	Arsenal Kyiv	Chernihiv
17:00 EEST (UTC+03:00)	Bohdanov 31'; Mostovyi (yellow card) 63'; Artem Favorov (yellow card) 65'; Denys Favorov (yellow card) 73'; Kartushov (yellow card) 89'	Report	Pidkivka (yellow card) 76'	Stadium: Chernihiv Stadium; Attendance: 2,040; Referee: Anatoliy Abdula

29 May 2019 32	Arsenal Kyiv	2–3	Karpaty Lviv	Kyiv
17:00 EEST (UTC+03:00)	Kovpak 4'; Orikhovskyi (yellow card) 47'; Yanakov (yellow card) 82'; Avahimyan 90+2'	Report	Kovtun (yellow card) 16'; Nesterov 18'; Myakushko 20' (pen.); Klyots (yellow card) 44'; Miroshnichenko 45+2'; Ponde (yellow card) 69'; Fedetskyi (yellow card) 76'	Stadium: Dynamo Stadium; Attendance: 433; Referee: Yaroslav Kozyk

=== Ukrainian Cup ===
26 September 2018 Round of 32	Cherkashchyna-Akademiya Bilozirya	3–2	Arsenal Kyiv	Bilozirya
17:00 EEST (UTC+03:00)	Tumofiyenko 83', 87', (yellow card) 90' (yellow-red card) 99'; Koshelyuk (yellow card) 85'; Tenzhynskyi (yellow card) 89'; Tarasenko 115'	Report	Semotyuk 26'; Sukhoruchko 66'; Dubinchak (yellow card) 90'; Nasonov (yellow card) 118'	Stadium: Zorya Stadium; Attendance: 250

== Statistics ==
=== Appearances and goals ===
No.	Pos	Nat	Player	Total		Premier League		Cup	
No.	Pos	Nat	Player	Apps	Goals	Apps	Goals	Apps	Goals
Goalkeepers
12	GK	(Ukraine) UKR	Orest Budyuk	2	0	2	0	0	0
33	GK	(Ukraine) UKR	Dmytro Ivanov	1	0	0	0	1	0
77	GK	(Ukraine) UKR	Roman Pidkivka	14	0	14	0	0	0
Defenders
2	DF	(Ukraine) UKR	Oleksandr Osman	6	0	2+3	0	1	0
20	DF	(Ukraine) UKR	Dmytro Bashlay	12	0	12	0	0	0
29	DF	(Ukraine) UKR	Maksym Zhychykov	14	0	14	0	0	0
44	DF	(Ukraine) UKR	Danylo Sahutkin	19	0	13+5	0	1	0
74	DF	(Ukraine) UKR	Vladyslav Dubinchak	29	0	28	0	1	0
79	DF	(Ukraine) UKR	Serhiy Vakulenko	12	7	12	7	0	0
Midfielders
4	MF	(North Macedonia) MKD	Stefan Jevtoski	11	0	10+1	0	0	0
6	MF	(Ukraine) UKR	Andriy Stryzhak	6	0	2+3	0	1	0
8	MF	(Ukraine) UKR	Serhiy Semenyuk	14	1	5+8	1	0+1	0
9	MF	(Ukraine) UKR	Andriy Dombrovskyi	29	0	27+2	0	0	0
11	MF	(Georgia (country)) GEO	Jaba Lipartia	11	0	2+9	0	0	0
13	MF	(Ukraine) UKR	Yuriy Vakulko	10	0	6+3	0	1	0
16	MF	(Ukraine) UKR	Pavlo Orikhovskyi	25	3	22+2	3	0+1	0
21	MF	(Ukraine) UKR	Vladyslav Kalitvintsev	11	1	10+1	1	0	0
22	MF	(Ukraine) UKR	Artur Avahimyan	8	2	7+1	2	0	0
23	MF	(Ukraine) UKR	Vyacheslav Tankovskyi	12	1	12	1	0	0
50	MF	(Ukraine) UKR	Volodymyr Doronin	5	0	2+3	0	0	0
59	MF	(Ukraine) UKR	Artem Kozak	4	0	2+2	0	0	0
78	MF	(France) FRA	Curtis Yebli	4	0	2+2	0	0	0
91	MF	(Ukraine) UKR	Mykhailo Mudryk	10	0	6+4	0	0	0
99	MF	(Ukraine) UKR	Denys Yanakov	5	0	2+2	0	1	0
Forwards
7	FW	(Armenia) ARM	Gegham Kadymyan	11	0	7+4	0	0	0
10	FW	(Ukraine) UKR	Denys Balanyuk	8	0	6+2	0	0	0
15	FW	(Ukraine) UKR	Danyil Sukhoruchko	2	1	0+1	0	1	1
19	FW	(Ukraine) UKR	Oleksandr Kovpak	13	3	4+9	3	0	0
27	FW	(Gabon) GAB	Gaëtan Missi Mezu	9	1	8+1	1	0	0
71	FW	(Ukraine) UKR	Vladyslav Semotyuk	2	1	1	0	1	1
98	FW	(Ukraine) UKR	Vladyslav Alekseyev	10	0	8+1	0	1	0
Players transferred out during the season
3	DF	(Ukraine) UKR	Oleksiy Maydanevych	13	1	12+1	1	0	0
5	DF	(Serbia) SRB	Marko Nikolić	4	0	3+1	0	0	0
7	MF	(Ukraine) UKR	Serhiy Hryn	8	4	6+2	4	0	0
17	MF	(Ukraine) UKR	Yuriy Bushman	10	0	8+2	0	0	0
18	MF	(Ukraine) UKR	Ruslan Chernenko	1	0	0+1	0	0	0
19	MF	(Ukraine) UKR	Vadym Semchuk	1	0	1	0	0	0
20	DF	(Togo) TOG	Serge Akakpo	5	0	5	0	0	0
21	DF	(Croatia) CRO	Ivan Borna Jelić Balta	4	0	4	0	0	0
23	DF	(Ukraine) UKR	Oleksandr Nasonov	10	0	6+3	0	1	0
24	DF	(Argentina) ARG	Oscar Piris	7	0	7	0	0	0
30	FW	(Ukraine) UKR	Maksym Feshchuk	6	0	4+2	0	0	0
31	GK	(Ukraine) UKR	Serhiy Sitalo	16	0	16	0	0	0
32	MF	(Ukraine) UKR	Serhiy Datsenko	2	0	1+1	0	0	0
75	DF	(Ukraine) UKR	Danylo Karas	9	0	6+2	0	0+1	0
77	MF	(Ukraine) UKR	Oleksandr Yermachenko	5	0	2+3	0	0	0
79	FW	(Ukraine) UKR	Leonid Akulinin	6	0	6	0	0	0
88	DF	(Ukraine) UKR	Dmytro Zozulya	5	0	4+1	0	0	0
91	MF	(Democratic Republic of the Congo) COD	Aurélien Ngeyitala	16	1	13+2	1	0+1	0

Source: Competitions

Last updated: 31 May 2019

=== Goalscorers ===
Rank	No.	Pos	Nat	Name	Premier League	Cup	Total
1	79	DF	(Ukraine)	Serhiy Vakulenko	7	0	7
2	7	MF	(Ukraine)	Serhiy Hryn	4	0	4
3	16	MF	(Ukraine)	Pavlo Orikhovskyi	3	0	3
3	19	FW	(Ukraine)	Oleksandr Kovpak	3	0	3
5	22	MF	(Ukraine)	Artur Avahimyan	2	0	2
6	3	DF	(Ukraine)	Oleksiy Maydanevych	1	0	1
6	8	MF	(Ukraine)	Serhiy Semenyuk	1	0	1
6	15	FW	(Ukraine)	Danyil Sukhoruchko	0	1	1
6	21	MF	(Ukraine)	Vladyslav Kalitvintsev	1	0	1
6	23	MF	(Ukraine)	Vyacheslav Tankovskyi	1	0	1
6	71	FW	(Gabon)	Gaëtan Missi Mezu	1	0	1
6	71	FW	(Ukraine)	Vladyslav Semotyuk	0	1	1
6	91	MF	(Democratic Republic of the Congo)	Aurélien Ngeyitala	1	0	1
				Own goal	1	0	1
				Total	26	2	28

Last updated: 31 May 2019

=== Clean sheets ===
Rank	No.	Pos	Nat	Name	Premier League	Cup	Total
1	77	GK	(Ukraine)	Roman Pidkivka	3	0	3
1	31	GK	(Ukraine)	Serhiy Sitalo	1	0	1
				Total	4	0	4

Last updated: 31 May 2019

=== Disciplinary record ===
No.	Pos	Nat	Player	Premier League			Cup			Total		
No.	Pos	Nat	Player	Booked	(yellow card) (yellow-red card)	Sent off (straight red)	Booked	(yellow card) (yellow-red card)	Sent off (straight red)	Booked	(yellow card) (yellow-red card)	Sent off (straight red)
2	DF	(Ukraine)	Oleksandr Osman	1	0	0	0	0	0	1	0	0
3	DF	(Ukraine)	Oleksiy Maydanevych	4	0	0	0	0	0	4	0	0
4	MF	(North Macedonia)	Stefan Jevtoski	6	0	0	0	0	0	6	0	0
5	DF	(Serbia)	Marko Nikolić	2	0	0	0	0	0	2	0	0
6	MF	(Ukraine)	Andriy Stryzhak	1	0	0	0	0	0	1	0	0
7	MF	(Ukraine)	Serhiy Hryn	1	0	0	0	0	0	1	0	0
7	FW	(Armenia)	Gegham Kadymyan	3	0	0	0	0	0	3	0	0
8	MF	(Ukraine)	Serhiy Semenyuk	2	0	0	0	0	0	2	0	0
9	MF	(Ukraine)	Andriy Dombrovskyi	3	1	0	0	0	0	3	1	0
10	FW	(Ukraine)	Denys Balanyuk	1	0	0	0	0	0	1	0	0
11	MF	(Georgia (country))	Jaba Lipartia	1	0	0	0	0	0	1	0	0
13	MF	(Ukraine)	Yuriy Vakulko	1	0	0	0	0	0	1	0	0
16	MF	(Ukraine)	Pavlo Orikhovskyi	8	0	0	0	0	0	8	0	0
20	DF	(Ukraine)	Dmytro Bashlay	3	1	0	0	0	0	3	1	0
21	DF	(Croatia)	Ivan Borna Jelić Balta	2	0	0	0	0	0	2	0	0
21	MF	(Ukraine)	Vladyslav Kalitvintsev	1	0	0	0	0	0	1	0	0
22	MF	(Ukraine)	Artur Avahimyan	2	0	0	0	0	0	2	0	0
23	DF	(Ukraine)	Oleksandr Nasonov	0	0	0	1	0	0	1	0	0
23	MF	(Ukraine)	Vyacheslav Tankovskyi	6	0	0	0	0	0	6	0	0
24	DF	(Argentina)	Oscar Piris	3	0	1	0	0	0	3	0	1
29	DF	(Ukraine)	Maksym Zhychykov	3	0	0	0	0	0	3	0	0
31	GK	(Ukraine)	Serhiy Sitalo	2	0	0	0	0	0	2	0	0
32	MF	(Ukraine)	Serhiy Datsenko	1	0	0	0	0	0	1	0	0
44	DF	(Ukraine)	Danylo Sahutkin	5	0	0	0	0	0	5	0	0
74	DF	(Ukraine)	Vladyslav Dubinchak	10	0	0	1	0	0	11	0	0
75	DF	(Ukraine)	Danylo Karas	1	0	0	0	0	0	1	0	0
77	GK	(Ukraine)	Roman Pidkivka	2	0	0	0	0	0	2	0	0
77	MF	(Ukraine)	Oleksandr Yermachenko	1	0	0	0	0	0	1	0	0
78	MF	(France)	Curtis Yebli	2	0	0	0	0	0	2	0	0
79	FW	(Ukraine)	Leonid Akulinin	1	0	0	0	0	0	1	0	0
79	DF	(Ukraine)	Serhiy Vakulenko	2	0	0	0	0	0	2	0	0
88	DF	(Ukraine)	Dmytro Zozulya	2	0	0	0	0	0	2	0	0
91	MF	(Democratic Republic of the Congo)	Aurélien Ngeyitala	1	1	0	0	0	0	1	1	0
99	MF	(Ukraine)	Denys Yanakov	1	0	0	0	0	0	1	0	0
			Total	85	3	1	2	0	0	87	3	1

Last updated: 31 May 2019
