= 1968 in Iran =

- Decades: 1940s; 1950s; 1960s; 1970s; 1980s
- See also: Other events of 1968; Years in Iran

Events from the year 1968 in Iran.

== Incumbents ==
- Shah: Mohammad Reza Pahlavi
- Prime Minister: Amir-Abbas Hoveida

== Events ==
- 31 August – The first in a destructive earthquake doublet affected eastern Iran. The 7.4 M_{w} Dasht-e Bayaz earthquake shook the area with a maximum Mercalli intensity of X (Extreme). Fifteen-thousand people were killed.
- 1 September – The second in the sequence, the 6.4 M_{w} Ferdows earthquake, destroyed many villages, including Ferdows. Nine-hundred people were killed.

== Births ==
- 2 June – Navid Negahban.

=== Full date unknown ===
- Shiva Mahbobi, political activist

== Deaths ==
- 7 January – Gholamreza Takhti.
- 4 April – Muhammad Taha al-Huwayzi.

== See also ==
- Years in Iraq
- Years in Afghanistan
