= 1955 in Iran =

- Decades: 1930s; 1940s; 1950s; 1960s; 1970s
- See also: Other events of 1955; Years in Iran

Events from the year 1955 in Iran.

== Incumbents ==
- Shah: Mohammad Reza Pahlavi
- Prime Minister: Fazlollah Zahedi (until April 7), Hossein Ala' (starting April 7)

== Establishments ==
- Ahvaz Jundishapur University of Medical Sciences
- Shahid Chamran University of Ahvaz

== Births ==
- 18 May – Farhad Moshiri, businessman.
- 29 September – Ali Shamkhani, naval officer and politician. (d. 2026)
- 1 December – Azar Nafisi, writer and academic.
- 14 December - Ali Abolhassani, historian. (d. 2012)

== See also ==
- Years in Iraq
- Years in Afghanistan
