= Semchuk =

Surname list

Semchuk is a surname. Notable people with the surname include:

- Brandy Semchuk (born 1971), Canadian ice hockey player
- Martin Semchuk (1914–2000), Canadian merchant and politician
- Sandra Semchuk (born 1948), Canadian photographic artist
- Vadym Semchuk (born 1993), Ukrainian footballer
