= 1956 in Iran =

- Decades: 1930s; 1940s; 1950s; 1960s; 1970s
- See also: Other events of 1956; Years in Iran

Events from the year 1956 in Iran.

== Incumbents ==
- Shah: Mohammad Reza Pahlavi
- Prime Minister: Hossein Ala'

== Births ==
- 28 October – Mahmoud Ahmadinejad

== See also ==
- Years in Iraq
- Years in Afghanistan
