= 1961 in Iran =

- Decades: 1940s; 1950s; 1960s; 1970s; 1980s
- See also: Other events of 1961; Years in Iran

The following lists events that happened during 1961 in the Imperial State of Iran.

== Incumbents ==
- Shah: Mohammad Reza Pahlavi
- Prime Minister: Jafar Sharif-Emami (until May 5), Ali Amini (starting May 5)

== Births ==
- 24 March – Rita, singer
- 11 July – Mohammad Kazemi, intelligence officer (died 2025)
- 21 October – Alireza Akbari, politician (died 2023)
- Ali Alilu, politician
- Mohammad Hosein Farhanghi, politician

== See also ==
- Years in Iraq
- Years in Afghanistan
