= Serhiy Datsenko =

Serhiy Datsenko may refer to:

- Serhiy Datsenko (footballer born 1977), Ukrainian footballer
- Serhiy Datsenko (footballer born 1987), Ukrainian footballer
