= 1962 in Iran =

- Decades: 1940s; 1950s; 1960s; 1970s; 1980s
- See also: Other events of 1962; Years in Iran

The following lists events that happened during 1962 in Iran.

== Incumbents ==
- Shah: Mohammad Reza Pahlavi
- Prime Minister: Ali Amini (until July 19), Asadollah Alam (starting July 19)

== Events ==
- 1 September – the 7.1 M_{L} Buin Zahra earthquake shook northern Iran with a maximum Mercalli intensity of IX (Violent), killing at least 12,225 and injuring 2,776.

== Births ==
- 21 March – Farahnaz Bahrami, Norwegian politician
- 5 September – Masoumeh Abad, writer, university professor, politician and activist
- 14 September – Zahra Dowlatabadi.
- 19 December – Kamshad Kooshan.
