= 1958 in Iran =

- Decades: 1930s; 1940s; 1950s; 1960s; 1970s
- See also: Other events of 1958; Years in Iran

Events from the year 1958 in Iran.

== Incumbents ==
- Shah: Mohammad Reza Pahlavi
- Prime Minister: Manouchehr Eghbal

== Events ==
- April 6 – Soraya Esfandiary-Bakhtiari is divorced by the Shah of Iran, Mohammad Reza Pahlavi, after she is unable to produce any children.

== Births ==
- January 6 – Mohsen Rastani, photographer and journalist
- January 28 – Mohammad-Ali Abtahi, theologian, scholar, and activist
- July 11 – Fereydoon Abbasi, nuclear scientist (d. 2025)

== Deaths ==
- Death of Ali Soheili.
