= Ivan Jelić Balta =

Croatian footballer

Personal information
- Full name: Ivan Borna Jelić Balta
- Date of birth: 17 September 1992 (age 34)
- Place of birth: Zagreb, Croatia
- Height: 1.93 m (6 ft 4 in)
- Position: Defensive midfielder

Team information
- Current team: Mura
- Number: 5

Youth career
- 2004–2010: Bjelovar

Senior career*
Years	Team	Apps	(Gls)
2010–2012	Bjelovar		
2012–2013	Mladost Ždralovi		
2014–2015	SV Hellas 94 Bietigheim		
2015–2016	Stuttgarter Kickers II	19	(0)
2016	Mladost Ždralovi		
2017	Rudeš	10	(1)
2018	Varaždin	8	(0)
2018	Arsenal Kyiv	4	(0)
2019–2022	Koper	70	(4)
2022–2023	Wisła Kraków	16	(0)
2023	→ Sarajevo (loan)	13	(0)
2023–2025	Sarajevo	6	(0)
2024	→ Slaven Belupo (loan)	19	(0)
2025–2026	Koper	9	(1)
2026–	Mura	11	(0)
- * Club domestic league appearances and goals as of 16:32, 19 April 2026 (UTC)

Ivan Borna Jelić Balta (born 17 September 1992) is a Croatian professional footballer who plays for Slovenian PrvaLiga club Mura. Primarily a defensive midfielder, he can also play as a centre-back.

== Club career ==
Born in Zagreb, Jelić Balta is a native of Bjelovar where he went through the school of the local NK Bjelovar, joining the ranks of the third-tier first team in 2010. After two seasons, he joined local rivals Mladost Ždralovi in the same tier, which ended up winning the 2012–13 season of the Croatian Third League.

After that, he played for lower division clubs in Germany until his return to Croatia. In July 2018, he signed a contract with newly promoted Ukrainian Premier League club Arsenal Kyiv.

== Career statistics ==
As of match played 30 November 2025

Appearances and goals by club, season and competition
Club	Season	League			National cup (Note: Includes Croatian Cup, Ukrainian Cup, Slovenian Cup, Polish Cup, Bosnia and Herzegovina Cup)		Continental		Other		Total	
Club	Season	Division	Apps	Goals	Apps	Goals	Apps	Goals	Apps	Goals	Apps	Goals
Stuttgarter Kickers II	2015–16	Oberliga Baden-Württemberg	19	0	—		—		—		19	0
Rudeš	2016–17	Croatian Second League	9	1	0	0	—		—		9	1
Rudeš	2017–18	Croatian First League	1	0	1	0	—		—		2	0
Rudeš	Total		10	1	1	0	—		—		11	1
Varaždin	2017–18	Croatian Second League	8	0	0	0	—		2 (Note: Appearance(s) in Prva HNL relegation play-offs)	0	10	0
Arsenal Kyiv	2018–19	Ukrainian Premier League	4	0	0	0	—		—		4	0
Koper	2019–20	Slovenian Second League	17	1	3	0	—		—		20	1
Koper	2020–21	Slovenian PrvaLiga	24	1	3	1	—		2 (Note: Appearance(s) in Slovenian PrvaLiga relegation play-offs)	1	29	3
Koper	2021–22	Slovenian PrvaLiga	29	2	3	0	—		—		32	2
Koper	Total		70	4	9	1	—		2	1	81	6
Wisła Kraków	2022–23	I liga	16	0	3	0	—		—		19	0
Sarajevo (loan)	2022–23	Bosnian Premier League	13	0	0	0	—		—		13	0
Sarajevo	2023–24	Bosnian Premier League	1	0	0	0	2 (Note: Appearance(s) in UEFA Europa Conference League)	0	—		3	0
Sarajevo	2024–25	Bosnian Premier League	5	0	2	0	—		—		7	0
Sarajevo	Total		19	0	2	0	2	0	—		23	0
Slaven Belupo (loan)	2023–24	Croatian Football League	9	0	0	0	—		—		9	0
Slaven Belupo (loan)	2024–25	Croatian Football League	10	0	2	0	—		—		12	0
Slaven Belupo (loan)	Total		19	0	2	0	—		—		21	0
Koper	2025–26	Slovenian PrvaLiga	9	1	0	0	—		—		9	1
Career total			172	6	17	1	2	0	4	1	195	8

== Honours ==
Rudeš

- Croatian Second League: 2016–17

Koper

- Slovenian Cup: 2021–22

Sarajevo

- Bosnian Cup: 2024–25
