= Serhiy Semenyuk =

Ukrainian footballer (born 1991)

Personal information
- Full name: Serhiy Volodymyrovych Semenyuk
- Date of birth: 27 January 1991 (age 35)
- Place of birth: Izyaslav, Soviet Union (now Ukraine)
- Height: 1.74 m (5 ft 9 in)
- Position: Midfielder

Team information
- Current team: SV Grün-Weiß Lübben

Youth career
- 2004–2008: Shakhtar Donetsk

Senior career*
Years	Team	Apps	(Gls)
2008–2011	Shakhtar Donetsk	0	(0)
2008–2010	→ Shakhtar-3 Donetsk	70	(4)
2011	Enerhetyk Burshtyn	12	(0)
2012–2014	Dynamo Brest	63	(1)
2015	Šiauliai	9	(0)
2015	Dynamo Brest	8	(0)
2016	Poltava	11	(1)
2016–2019	Arsenal Kyiv	69	(6)
2019–2022	Ahrobiznes Volochysk	74	(8)
2022–2023	VfB Krieschow	28	(0)
2023–	SV Grün-Weiß Lübben	30	(1)

International career
2006–2007	Ukraine U16	10	(1)
2006–2008	Ukraine U17	10	(1)
2008	Ukraine U18	1	(0)
- * Club domestic league appearances and goals as of 1 July 2024

Serhiy Volodymyrovych Semenyuk, formerly Serhiy Zayika (Ukrainian: Сергій Володимирович Семенюк; birth name: Сергій Володимирович Заїка; born 27 January 1991) is a Ukrainian professional footballer who plays as a midfielder for German club SV Grün-Weiß Lübben.
