= 1965 in Iran =

- Decades: 1940s; 1950s; 1960s; 1970s; 1980s
- See also: Other events of 1965; Years in Iran

Events from the year 1965 in Iran.

== Incumbents ==
- Shah: Mohammad Reza Pahlavi
- Prime Minister: Hassan-Ali Mansur (until January 26), Amir-Abbas Hoveida (starting January 26)

== Sports ==
- 1965 World Weightlifting Championships

== Establishments ==
- National Iranian Gas Company.

== Deaths ==
- 27 January – Hassan Ali Mansur, 69th Prime Minister of Iran, dies five days being shot in an assassination attempt.

== See also ==
- Years in Iraq
- Years in Afghanistan
