= 1954 in Iran =

- Decades: 1930s; 1940s; 1950s; 1960s; 1970s
- See also: Other events of 1954; Years in Iran

Events from the year 1954 in Iran.

== Incumbents ==
- Shah: Mohammad Reza Pahlavi
- Prime Minister: Fazlollah Zahedi

== Events ==
=== August ===
- Great Iran Flood kills about 10,000 people.

=== November ===
- Death of Hossein Fatemi
