= 1960 in Iran =

- Decades: 1940s; 1950s; 1960s; 1970s; 1980s
- See also: Other events of 1960; Years in Iran

The following lists events that happened during 1960 in the Imperial State of Iran.

== Incumbents ==
- Shah: Mohammad Reza Pahlavi
- Prime Minister: Manouchehr Eghbal (until August 31), Jafar Sharif-Emami (starting August 31)

== Events ==
- The magnitude 6 Lar earthquake causes 420 deaths in southern Iran.

== Births ==
- 7 January – Mohammad Javad Zarif, diplomat.
- 11 July – Jafar Panahi, film director.
- 31 October – Reza Pahlavi, Crown Prince of Iran.

== See also ==
- Years in Iraq
- Years in Afghanistan
