= 1953 in Iran =

- Decades: 1930s; 1940s; 1950s; 1960s; 1970s
- See also: Other events of 1952; Years in Iran

Events from the year 1953 in Iran.

== Incumbents ==
- Shah: Mohammad Reza Pahlavi
- Prime Minister: Mohammad Mosaddegh (until August 19), Fazlollah Zahedi (starting August 19)

== Events ==
=== February ===
- The 6.6 M_{w} Torud earthquake shook northern Iran with a maximum Mercalli intensity of VIII (Severe). Between 800–973 were killed and 140 were injured.

=== August ===
- 1953 Iranian coup d'état – Overthrow of Prime Minister Mohammad Mosaddegh.

== Births ==
=== Date unknown ===
- Hamid Ahmadieh, Iranian ophthalmologist, medical scientist, and medical pioneer
