= 1969 in Iran =

- Decades: 1940s; 1950s; 1960s; 1970s; 1980s
- See also: Other events of 1969; Years in Iran

Events from the year 1969 in Iran.

== Incumbents ==
- Shah: Mohammad Reza Pahlavi
- Prime Minister: Amir-Abbas Hoveida

== Births ==
- 22 November – Marjane Satrapi

== See also ==
- Years in Iraq
- Years in Afghanistan
