= 1966 in Iran =

- Decades: 1940s; 1950s; 1960s; 1970s; 1980s
- See also: Other events of 1966; Years in Iran

Events from the year 1966 in Iran.

== Incumbents ==
- Shah: Mohammad Reza Pahlavi
- Prime Minister: Amir-Abbas Hoveida

== Births ==
- 18 February – Guli Francis-Dehqani, Anglican bishop
- 12 September – Anousheh Ansari, engineer
- Roya Hakakian, journalist and writer

== See also ==
- Years in Iraq
- Years in Afghanistan
