= 1963 in Iran =

- Decades: 1940s; 1950s; 1960s; 1970s; 1980s
- See also: Other events of 1963; Years in Iran

Events from the year 1963 in Iran.

== Incumbents ==
- Shah: Mohammad Reza Pahlavi
- Prime Minister: Asadollah Alam

== Events ==
- January 26 – 1963 Iranian constitutional referendum
- June 5 and 6 – June 5, 1963, demonstrations in Iran
- September 17 – 1963 Iranian legislative election

== Births ==
- 1 January – Camila Batmanghelidjh, charity executive (d. 2024).
- 24 November – Kayhan Kalhor.

== Deaths ==
- 2 November – Tayeb Hajrezaei, freelance job (b. 1912).

== See also ==
- Years in Iraq
- Years in Afghanistan
