= 1964 in Iran =

- Decades: 1940s; 1950s; 1960s; 1970s; 1980s
- See also: Other events of 1964; Years in Iran

Events from the year 1964 in Iran.

== Incumbents ==
- Shah: Mohammad Reza Pahlavi
- Prime Minister: Asadollah Alam (until March 7), Hassan-Ali Mansur (starting March 7)

== Events ==
- Ruhollah Khomeini was arrested in November 1964, held for half a year and sent into exile where he remained for 15 years (mostly in Najaf, Iraq), until the revolution.

== Deaths ==
- 13 July – Death of Hossein Ala'
