= 1959 in Iran =

- Decades: 1930s; 1940s; 1950s; 1960s; 1970s
- See also: Other events of 1959; Years in Iran

The following lists events that happened during 1959 in the Imperial State of Iran.

== Incumbents ==
- Shah: Mohammad Reza Pahlavi
- Prime Minister: Manouchehr Eghbal

== Events ==
Establishment of Tehran Nuclear Research Center (TNRC).

=== March ===
- March 5 – At Ankara, the United States agreed to defend the remaining members of the Central Treaty Organization in case of attack, signing bilateral defense agreements with Iran, Turkey and Pakistan.

== See also ==
- Years in Iraq
- Years in Afghanistan
