= 1957 in Iran =

- Decades: 1930s; 1940s; 1950s; 1960s; 1970s
- See also: Other events of 1957; Years in Iran

Events from the year 1957 in Iran.

== Incumbents ==
- Shah: Mohammad Reza Pahlavi
- Prime Minister: Hossein Ala' (until April 3), Manouchehr Eghbal (starting April 3)

== Events ==
- 2 July – The Alborz earthquake with a magnitude of 7.1 strikes Mazandaran province, killing at least 1,500 people.
- 13 December – The M_{w} 6.5 Farsinaj earthquake strikes Hamadan province, killing at least 1,130 people.

== Births ==
- 26 March – Shirin Neshat.
- 16 June – Hamid Aboutalebi.

== See also ==
- Years in Iraq
- Years in Afghanistan
