= Mykhailo Mudryk =

Ukrainian footballer (born 2001)

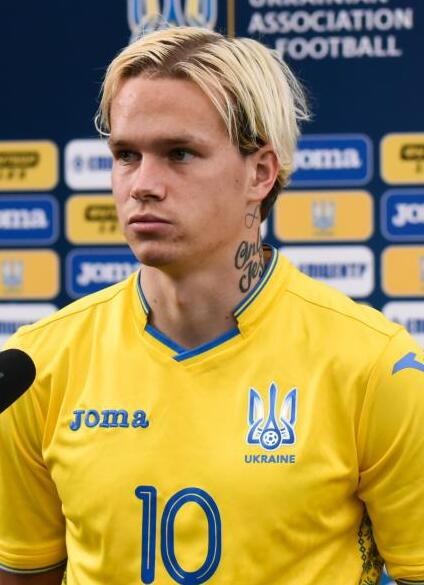
- Mudryk with Ukraine in 2021

Personal information
- Full name: Mykhailo Petrovych Mudryk
- Date of birth: 5 January 2001 (age 25)
- Place of birth: Berestyn, Ukraine
- Height: 1.75 m (5 ft 9 in)
- Position: Left winger

Team information
- Current team: Tottenham Hotspur (on loan from Chelsea)
- Number: 27

Youth career
- 2010–2014: Metalist Kharkiv
- 2014–2016: Dnipro
- 2016–2018: Shakhtar Donetsk

Senior career*
| Years | Team | Apps | (Gls) |
| 2018–2023 | Shakhtar Donetsk | 29 | (9) |
| 2019 | → Arsenal Kyiv (loan) | 10 | (0) |
| 2020–2021 | → Desna Chernihiv (loan) | 10 | (0) |
| 2023– | Chelsea | 53 | (5) |
| 2026– | → Tottenham Hotspur (loan) | 1 | (0) |

International career^{‡}
| 2016–2017 | Ukraine U16 | 9 | (3) |
| 2017–2018 | Ukraine U17 | 10 | (3) |
| 2018–2019 | Ukraine U19 | 12 | (5) |
| 2019–2023 | Ukraine U21 | 18 | (3) |
| 2022– | Ukraine | 28 | (3) |
Medal record
Men's football
Representing Ukraine
UEFA European Under-21 Championship
| Bronze medal – third place | 2023 |
- * Club domestic league appearances and goals as of 15:55, 5 September 2026 (UTC) ‡ National team caps and goals as of 19 November 2024

Mykhailo Petrovych Mudryk (Ukrainian: Михайло Петрович Мудрик; born 5 January 2001) is a Ukrainian professional footballer who plays as a left winger for Premier League club Tottenham Hotspur, on loan from Chelsea, and the Ukraine national team.

Mudryk began his career in the academies of Metalist Kharkiv and Dnipro, before moving to Shakhtar Donetsk in 2016. He made his professional debut two years later, followed by loans to Arsenal Kyiv and Desna Chernihiv. In 2023, he moved to English club Chelsea in a transfer worth an initial €70 million (£62 million), making him the most expensive Ukrainian footballer and the most expensive player signed from the Ukrainian Premier League. Between December 2024 and July 2026, he served a suspension from football for testing positive in a doping test.

Mudryk has been a Ukrainian senior international since 2022, having previously featured in several youth levels. He represented the side at UEFA Euro 2024.

== Early and personal life ==
Mykhailo Mudryk was born on 5 January 2001 in Berestyn, Kharkiv Oblast. An Orthodox Christian, he frequently carries religious icons to matches and has spoken openly about the importance faith has to him, which was shown by his grandmother. Mudryk has several tattoos, but considers the one which reads "Only Jesus" as his most important. He is known as "Misha" to his friends and coaches.

Mudryk is in a relationship with an American model, dancer, and actress Jordyn Jones.

== Club career ==
=== Early career ===
Mudryk began playing football at Metalist Kharkiv in 2010, before moving to Dnipro's academy in 2014. After quickly rising through the age groups, Mudryk attracted the interest of Shakhtar Donetsk, and he signed for the club's academy in 2016.

=== Shakhtar Donetsk ===
==== 2018–2021: Making senior debut ====
In the 2018–19 season, he played for Shakhtar in the under-21 category. Mudryk was promoted to the first team later that year, He made his first-team debut aged 17 on 31 October 2018 in a Ukrainian Cup match against Olimpik Donetsk, which Shakhtar won 1–0.

After struggling to get playing minutes, he was loaned to Ukrainian Premier League club Arsenal Kyiv in February 2019 for the remainder of the 2018–19 season, playing 10 matches without scoring any goals. He played in the Ukrainian Premier League against Desna Chernihiv, Kolos Kovalivka, and Oleksandriya giving the contribution to win the title in the 2019–20 season. In the summer of 2020, he signed a loan agreement with the Ukrainian Premier League club Desna Chernihiv and qualified for the UEFA Europa League third qualifying round. He stayed four months in Chernihiv and played 10 matches in the 2020–21 Ukrainian Premier League and once in the 2020–21 Ukrainian Cup.

==== 2021–2023: Breakthrough ====
On 8 January 2021, Mudryk returned to Shakhtar, playing three matches in the 2020–21 Ukrainian Premier League and joining Shakhtar's reserve team, featuring sporadically for manager Luís Castro.

In the 2021–22 season, Mudryk found more and more space as a starter, especially with the arrival of Roberto De Zerbi at the helm of Shakhtar, who had the reputation of trusting in young players. With his previous managers, failing to bring the best out of Mudryk, De Zerbi decided to recall him from his loan spell and requested a meeting with him. After the meeting, Mudryk developed a new mentality and his manager considered him one of the best young players, adding that "if I don't bring him to a high level, I will consider it a personal defeat".

On 25 August 2021, Mudryk made his UEFA Champions League debut against Monaco, replacing Manor Solomon in the 82nd minute in the play-off round of the tournament. His cross in the 114th minute ricocheted off Ruben Aguilar on the Monegasque net, as Shakhtar qualified to the tournament 3–2 on aggregate. On 18 September, he scored his first goal for the club in a 5–0 win against Mariupol at the Volodymyr Boyko Stadium. On 3 December, Mudryk provided four assists in a 6–1 win against Lviv. On 31 December, he agreed to a contract extension to 2026. He was named the club's Player of the Month for the months of November and December.

On 24 February 2022, the Ukrainian Premier League was suspended due to the imposition of martial law in Ukraine due to the prelude to the Russian invasion of Ukraine and subsequent invasion by Russia. Mudryk finished the season with two goals and nine assists, being named the club's Player of the Year.

With football resuming in Ukraine, Mudryk started the 2022–23 season by scoring his first Champions League goal and providing two assists in a 4–1 away win over RB Leipzig. This was followed by another goal in a 1–1 Champions League draw to Celtic. On 19 October, he scored twice in a 3–0 win over Kolos Kovalivka. His prolific form saw him score seven goals and provide six assists in 12 matches, being named the Ukrainian Footballer of the Year and Shakhtar's Player of the Year.

=== Chelsea ===
==== 2023–2026: First season and doping ban ====
On 15 January 2023, Mudryk signed for Premier League club Chelsea on an eight-and-a-half-year contract for an initial transfer fee of €70 million (£62 million), potentially rising to €100 million (£89 million) in add-ons. This was the largest transfer fee received by Shakhtar and the Ukrainian Premier League, topping the previous record held by Fred, and made him the most expensive Ukrainian footballer.

Mudryk's debut came on 21 January, as Chelsea drew 0–0 away to Liverpool in a league match. His first start came against Fulham in a 0–0 draw on 4 February. On 2 October, Mudryk scored his first competitive goal for Chelsea on his 24th appearance, opening the scoring in a 2–0 Premier League win against Fulham. On 21 October, he scored his first goal at Stamford Bridge from a long range shot in a 2–2 draw against Arsenal. During an EFL Cup match against Newcastle United on 19 December 2023, Mudryk scored an equaliser in stoppage time to help his team to a 1–1 draw, which Chelsea would go on to win on penalties.

On 17 December 2024, it was reported that the FA had provisionally suspended Mudryk after testing positive for doping. On 5 June 2025, his number 10 shirt was given to Cole Palmer, meaning that Mudryk no longer had a designated squad number with Chelsea. Later that month, on 18 June, the FA charged him with violating anti-doping rules in which he could face a 4-year ban. On 29 April 2026, Mudryk was given a four-year ban from the Premier League lasting until 2028. He appealed against the decision.

On 31 July 2026, all charges were dropped and Mudryk became available to play again in all competitions. The club's statement explained that "advances in the applicable scientific reporting standards for more reliable testing mean that, had Misha's sample been analysed under today's technical requirements, it would not have been reported as a positive test and no anti-doping rule violation would have resulted." He made his first appearance for Chelsea on 5 August 2026 in a friendly against Juventus in Hong Kong, ending a 20-month layoff.

==== Loan to Tottenham Hotspur ====
On 1 September 2026, Mudryk joined Tottenham Hotspur on a season-long loan, becoming the first player to transfer directly between the two rival clubs since Carlo Cudicini in 2009. He would reunite with his former manager from Shakhtar Donetsk, Roberto De Zerbi.

On 5 September 2026, Mudryk made his debut for Spurs as a substitute in a 0–0 draw against Nottingham Forest. This was his first appearance in a competitive match in 646 days.

Two days later, on 7 September 2026, Mudryk would sustain an ankle injury during training, requiring a protective boot and keeping him sidelined for up to eight weeks. Three of the eight weeks would be during the extended international break, for which he had, up to that point, been expected to be called up for national team duty.

== International career ==
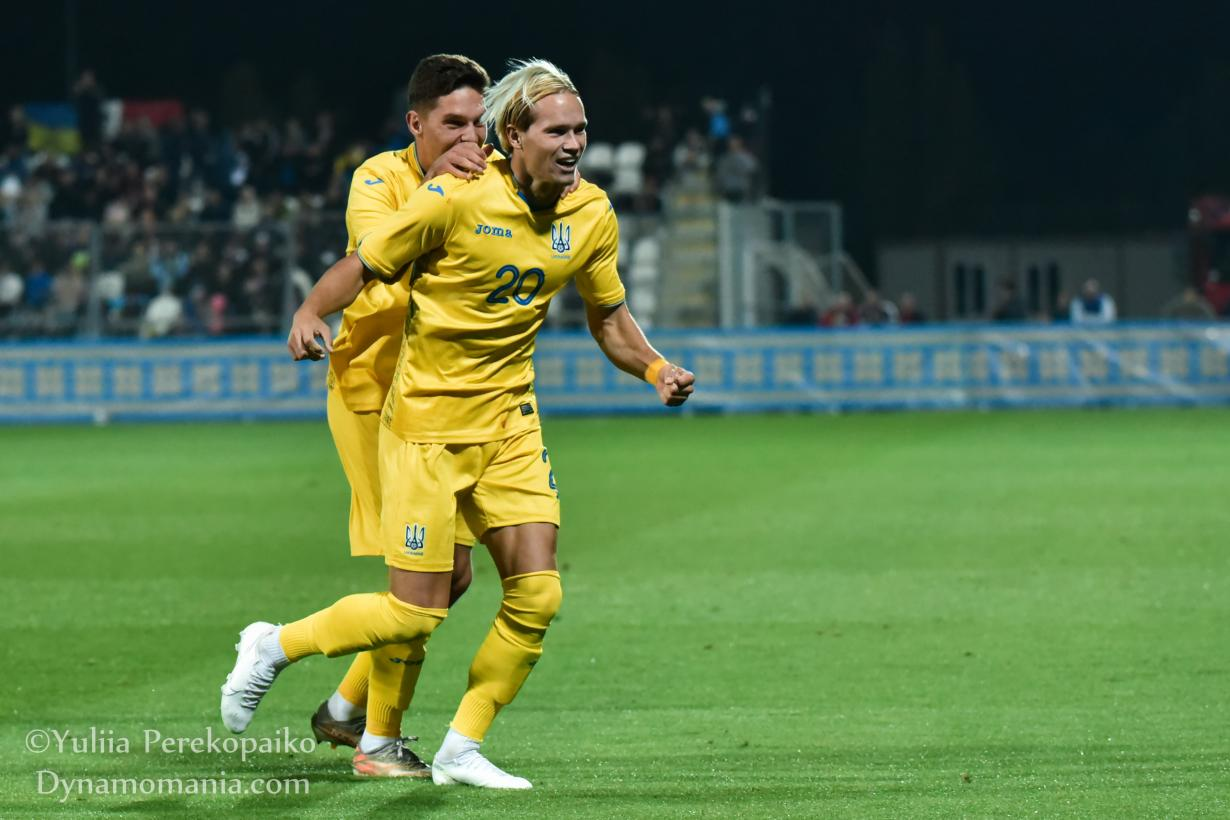
Heorhiy Sudakov and Mykhailo Mudryk playing for Ukraine U21

From 2017 to 2018, Mudryk played for the Ukraine U17. From 2018 to 2019, he played for the Ukraine U19, Playing 12 matches and scoring five goals. In 2019, he made his debut for Ukraine U21, tallying 16 appearances and scoring three goals. On 7 September 2021, he scored the winning goal from free-kick against Armenia. On 16 June 2023, Mudryk returned to Ukraine U21 squad for the 2023 UEFA European Under-21 Championship. He started in two matches and provided two assists in the tournament.

In April 2022, Mudryk was called up for the Ukraine national team for a training camp in April–May 2022 in Slovenia. On 1 June, he debuted in the 2022 FIFA World Cup qualifying playoff semi-finals, which Ukraine won 3–1 against Scotland.

On 17 October 2023, Mudryk scored his first senior international goal in a 3–1 UEFA Euro 2024 qualifying win against Malta. On 26 March 2024, he scored the winning goal of a 2–1 victory over Iceland in the qualifying play-off final to send Ukraine through to the official tournament.

== Player profile ==
Wesley Fofana, his teammate at Chelsea, stated that Mudryk is faster than Kylian Mbappé and probably the fastest player he has played against. In 2023, Ben Chilwell said, "With Mudryk, I see endless bags of potential that hasn't been fulfilled yet".

== Career statistics ==
=== Club ===
As of match played 5 September 2026

Appearances and goals by club, season and competition
| Club | Season | League | | | National cup (Note: Includes Ukrainian Cup, FA Cup) | | League cup (Note: Includes EFL Cup) | | Europe | | Other | | Total | |
| Club | Season | Division | Apps | Goals | Apps | Goals | Apps | Goals | Apps | Goals | Apps | Goals | Apps | Goals |
|---|---|---|---|---|---|---|---|---|---|---|---|---|---|---|
| Shakhtar Donetsk | 2018–19 | Ukrainian Premier League | 0 | 0 | 1 | 0 | — | | 0 | 0 | 0 | 0 | 1 | 0 |
| Shakhtar Donetsk | 2019–20 | Ukrainian Premier League | 3 | 0 | 0 | 0 | — | | 0 | 0 | 0 | 0 | 3 | 0 |
| Shakhtar Donetsk | 2020–21 | Ukrainian Premier League | 3 | 0 | — | | — | | 0 | 0 | — | | 3 | 0 |
| Shakhtar Donetsk | 2021–22 | Ukrainian Premier League | 11 | 2 | 1 | 0 | — | | 7 (Note: Appearances in UEFA Champions League) | 0 | 0 | 0 | 19 | 2 |
| Shakhtar Donetsk | 2022–23 | Ukrainian Premier League | 12 | 7 | — | | — | | 6 | 3 | — | | 18 | 10 |
| Shakhtar Donetsk | Total | | 29 | 9 | 2 | 0 | — | | 13 | 3 | 0 | 0 | 44 | 12 |
| Arsenal Kyiv (loan) | 2018–19 | Ukrainian Premier League | 10 | 0 | — | | — | | — | | — | | 10 | 0 |
| Desna Chernihiv (loan) | 2020–21 | Ukrainian Premier League | 10 | 0 | 1 | 0 | — | | — | | — | | 11 | 0 |
| Chelsea | 2022–23 | Premier League | 15 | 0 | — | | — | | 2 | 0 | — | | 17 | 0 |
| Chelsea | 2023–24 | Premier League | 31 | 5 | 5 | 1 | 5 | 1 | — | | — | | 41 | 7 |
| Chelsea | 2024–25 | Premier League | 7 | 0 | — | | 2 | 0 | 6 (Note: Appearances in UEFA Conference League) | 3 | — | | 15 | 3 |
| Chelsea | 2025–26 | Premier League | — | | — | | — | | — | | — | | — | |
| Chelsea | Total | | 53 | 5 | 5 | 1 | 7 | 1 | 8 | 3 | — | | 73 | 10 |
| Tottenham Hotspur (loan) | 2026–27 | Premier League | 1 | 0 | 0 | 0 | 0 | 0 | — | | — | | 1 | 0 |
| Career total | | | 103 | 14 | 8 | 1 | 7 | 1 | 21 | 6 | 0 | 0 | 139 | 22 |

=== International ===
As of match played 19 November 2024

Appearances and goals by national team and year
| National team | Year | Apps | Goals |
|---|---|---|---|
| Ukraine | 2022 | 8 | 0 |
| Ukraine | 2023 | 8 | 1 |
| Ukraine | 2024 | 12 | 2 |
| Total | | 28 | 3 |

As of match played 19 November 2024
Scores and results list Ukraine's goal tally first, score column indicates score after each Mudryk goal

List of international goals scored by Mykhailo Mudryk
| No. | Date | Venue | Cap | Opponent | Score | Result | Competition | Ref. |
|---|---|---|---|---|---|---|---|---|
| 1 | 17 October 2023 | National Stadium, Ta' Qali, Malta | 15 | Malta | 3–1 | 3–1 | UEFA Euro 2024 qualifying | |
| 2 | 26 March 2024 | Wrocław Stadium, Wrocław, Poland | 18 | Iceland | 2–1 | 2–1 | UEFA Euro 2024 qualifying | |
| 3 | 11 October 2024 | Poznań Stadium, Poznań, Poland | 25 | Georgia | 1–0 | 1–0 | 2024–25 UEFA Nations League B | |

== Honours ==
Shakhtar Donetsk

- Ukrainian Premier League: 2019–20, 2022–23

Chelsea

- UEFA Conference League: 2024–25
- EFL Cup runner-up: 2023–24

Individual

- Ukrainian Footballer of the Year: 2022
- Shakhtar Donetsk Player of the Year: 2021, 2022
- Golden talent of Ukraine: 2021 (U21), 2022 (U21)
