= Gaëtan Missi Mezu =

Footballer (born 1996)

Personal information
- Full name: Gaëtan Missi Mezu Kouakou
- Date of birth: 4 May 1996 (age 30)
- Place of birth: Villeneuve-d'Ascq, France
- Height: 1.82 m (6 ft 0 in)
- Position: Forward

Team information
- Current team: Martigues
- Number: 18

Youth career
- Toulouse Fontaines

Senior career*
Years	Team	Apps	(Gls)
2013–2014	Balma	20	(1)
2014–2015	Valenciennes II	28	(6)
2015–2016	Valenciennes	6	(0)
2016–2017	Paris FC	10	(0)
2016–2017	Paris FC II	10	(1)
2017–2018	Dunărea Călărași	30	(4)
2019	Arsenal Kyiv	9	(1)
2019–2020	Schaffhausen	19	(2)
2020	Ilves II	1	(1)
2020	Ilves	9	(1)
2021	Etar	14	(3)
2021	Tsarsko Selo	17	(0)
2022	Apollon Pontus	12	(1)
2022–2023	Cholet	11	(0)
2023	Borgo	15	(6)
2023–	Martigues	21	(2)

International career^{‡}
2016–2018	Gabon	10	(0)
- * Club domestic league appearances and goals as of 09:22, 17 June 2024 (UTC) ‡ National team caps and goals as of 1 May 2022

Gaëtan Missi Mezu Kouakou (born 4 May 1996) is a professional footballer who plays as a forward for side Martigues. Born in France, he plays for the Gabon national team.

== Club career ==
Missi Mezu was born in Villeneuve-d'Ascq, France. He began his football career as a youngster with Toulouse Fontaines, and played for CFA2 club Balma before joining Valenciennes in 2014. He made six appearances in Ligue 2 for Valenciennes in 2015–16. He signed for Paris FC, newly relegated to the Championnat National, in June 2016.

In March 2019, he moved to Arsenal Kyiv and made his debut on the third of March.

In May 2022, Missi Mezu signed with Cholet in France.

== International career ==
Missi Mezu made his international debut for Gabon on 28 May 2016 in a friendly match against Mauritania.

== Honours ==
Dunărea Călărași

- Liga II: 2017–18
