= Oleksiy Maydanevych =

Ukrainian footballer (born 1991)

Personal information
- Full name: Oleksiy Oleksandrovych Maydanevych
- Date of birth: 18 July 1991 (age 35)
- Place of birth: Kyiv, Ukrainian SSR
- Height: 1.82 m (6 ft 0 in)
- Position: Right-back

Team information
- Current team: Wicher Miedziana Góra

Youth career
- 2005–2009: Obolon-Zmina Kyiv

Senior career*
Years	Team	Apps	(Gls)
2009–2015	Obolon-Brovar Kyiv	57	(2)
2012	→ Obolon-2 Kyiv	15	(1)
2015	Bukovyna Chernivtsi	14	(2)
2016–2018	Arsenal Kyiv	77	(7)
2019	Shevardeni-1906 Tbilisi	14	(1)
2019–2022	Obolon Kyiv	70	(8)
2022–2023	KSZO Ostrowiec Świętokrzyski	22	(2)
2023–2024	Star Starachowice	30	(0)
2024–2025	Łysica Bodzentyn	27	(2)
2025–	Wicher Miedziana Góra	0	(0)
- * Club domestic league appearances and goals as of 10:48, 21 June 2025 (UTC)

Oleksiy Oleksandrovych Maydanevych (Ukrainian: Олексій Олександрович Майданевич; born 18 July 1991) is a Ukrainian professional footballer who plays as a right-back for Polish club Wicher Miedziana Góra.

== Career ==
Maydanevych is a product of the Obolon-Zmina academy. His first trainer was Hryhoriy Matiyenko. He spent his career as a player of Kyivan teams FC Obolon Kyiv, its phoenix club FC Obolon-Brovar Kyiv, and FC Arsenal-Kyiv Kyiv. In 2019, Maydanevych played for the Georgian second tier FC Shevardeni-1906 Tbilisi.

In November of 2020, Maydanevych was named the Ukrainian First League "Player of the Month".

On 18 September 2022, having already made his debut as a substitute in a 0–4 away league win against Wisła Sandomierz a day prior, it was announced he joined Polish club KSZO Ostrowiec Świętokrzyski. He decided not to extend his short-term deal with the club and left KSZO at the end of the year. However, on 6 January 2023 it was announced he would stay for another six months, after one of KSZO's partners decided to cover his wages.

On 4 July 2023, he signed with another III liga club Star Starachowice. After winning the Świętokrzyskie regional Polish Cup with Star in May 2024, Maydanevych left the club at the end of the season.

In August 2024, Maydanevych joined IV liga Świętokrzyskie side Łysica Bodzentyn.

== Honours ==
KSZO Ostrowiec

- Polish Cup (Świętokrzyskie regionals): 2022–23

Star Starachowice

- Polish Cup (Świętokrzyskie regionals): 2023–24
