= Shiva Mahbobi =

Iranian activist

- شیوا محبوبی
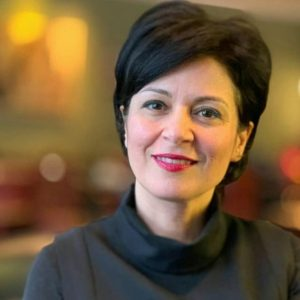
- Photo is taken in 2019
- Born: 1968 (age 57–58); Iran
- Occupations: Campaigner, women's rights & political activist, psychotherapist
- Known for: Campaigning for women's rights and release of political prisoners in Iran
- Spouse: Saeed Khalilirad

Shiva Mahbobi (Persian: شیوا محبوبی ) (born 1968) is a former Iranian political prisoner, psychotherapist and a prominent advocate known for her extensive efforts in mobilizing international support for the release of political prisoners in Iran. She is recognized for her persistent commitment to advancing women’s rights and raising awareness about women's suppression and the compulsory Hijab in Iran.

Mahbobi is known for her role as the co-founder and spokeswoman of the Campaign to Free Political Prisoners in Iran (CFPPI). Over a decade (2005-2016), she served as the producer and presenter of the Persian television program on women's rights and political prisoners. This show broadcast fortnightly from Kanal Jadid to Iran and Europe, focused on shedding light on the conditions of Iranian political prisoners. She initiated and organized a campaign for the establishment of the 20th of June as an International Day in Support of Political Prisoners in Iran. CFPPI is a non-profit organisation which was initially established in 2006 by a group of Iranian ex-political prisoners.

Mahbobi's impactful presence extends across various English, Persian, and Kurdish language media outlets in the UK and worldwide. She is a regular commentator on major Persian language platforms and has been invited as a speaker to notable events and conferences, including Cambridge Union, Durham Union, and the Global Dialogue on the Future of Iran in Toronto, Canada. She spoke at the UN Human Rights Council. Her profile was featured in British Vogue in 2023 as one of five women actively working towards effecting change in Iran. Shiva Mahbobi's experience in prison was featured in Missing, Presumed Dead, a 10-part true crime documentary series produced by Spirit Studios in collaboration with A+E Networks EMEA and Quintus Studios. Her story is presented in episode 107, titled "Under Lock and Key."

== Life and Early Activism ==
As a teenager, Mahbobi was a women's rights and students’ rights activist in Iran, which deemed her "waging war against God," according to the ruling Islamic Regime of Iran. Mahbobi initiated her activism against the suppression of the Islamic regime in Iran shortly after the 1979 revolution at the age of 11. Her activism led to her first arrest at the age of 12 during a demonstration demanding the reopening of their school; she was released after six days. Despite this, she persisted in her activities, resulting in subsequent arrests, torture, and imprisonment for more than three years at the age of 16. Following her release, she continued her political activities but eventually fled the country to avoid arrest and possible execution.

In her pursuit of safety, Mahbobi sought asylum via UNHCR in Turkey, where she resided for over two years before relocating to Canada in 1994 and later moving to the UK in late 2001.

During her time in Turkey, Mahbobi served on the executive committee of the International Federation of Iranian Refugees and was an activist for the International Campaign in Defence of Women's Rights in Iran. In Canada, she worked as the coordinator of the Action Committee in Defence of Women's Rights in Iran-Canada, actively raising awareness about the situation of Iranian women in collaboration with organizations like the National Action Committee on the Status of Women- Canada and Amnesty International-Canada.

Upon her move to the UK in 2001, Mahbobi took the role of public relations officer for the International Committee Against Stoning, working on a campaign against the stoning of women worldwide.
