= Ali Abolhassani =

Iranian writer, historian and essayist

علی ابوالحسنی Ali Abolhassani
- Born: 14 December 1955; Tehran, Iran
- Died: 22 February 2012 (aged 56)
- Resting place: Baghe Behesht Cemetery, Qom
- Occupations: Author, historian, religious researcher
- Writing career
- Pen name: Monzer
- Language: Persian
- Website: monzer.ir

Ali Abolhassani (Persian: علی ابوالحسنی), also known as Monzer (14 December 1955 – 22 February 2012), was an Iranian spiritual contemporary historiograph. Five-volume set book of "constitutional and Sheikh Fazlullah Nuri" including his books. Two books of "stability until the gallows" and "an analysis of the triple role of martyr Sheikh Nuri in tobacco boycott movement" is also of the other his works about Sheikh Fazlullah Nuri. His books use as reference in books written by scholars on Islam and history of Iran.

== Biography ==
Ali Abolhassani, son of Sheikh Mohammad, was born on 14 December 1955 in West area of Tehran. In June 1975, he took Technical Diploma and enrolled in Industrial Engineering field in University of Science and Technology in the same year. He had spent only three months as a student at the university. With the encouragement from his father, he left the university and joined the Islamic Seminary of Qom. After the Islamic revolution of Iran, he was interested in the contemporary history of Iran and in this case did a lot of work. Abolhassani on Wednesday evening of 22 February 2012 at the age of 56 due to heart failure died and was buried in Qom cemetery "Garden of Eden".

== Teachers ==
- Reza Davari Ardakani
- Hossein Mazaheri
- Ahmad Fardid

=== His gurus ===
- Modarres Afghani and Moosavi Gorgani (literature)
- Jafar Sobhani Tabrizi (Rijal science)
- Mirza Javad Tabrizi (religious jurisprudence)
- Hossein Vahid Khorasani (principles of religious jurisprudence)
- Hossein Mazaheri and Sheikh Javad Karbalayi (ethic)
- Mohammad Taghi Mesbah Yazdi (Islamic wisdoms)
- Seyyed Mohammad Kazem Ghazvini (Islamic wisdoms and Vilayat)
- Seyyed Morteza Askari (history of Islam)
- Hossein Lankarani (history and politics)
- Seyyed Ahmad Fardid and Reza Davari Ardakani (Occidentialism)

=== His occupation ===
- Faculty member of Osveh Publications
- Master in Imam Khomeini Education and Research Institute
- Chairman of the Scientific Council of the Department of History and Civilization of Islamic Thought and Culture Research
- Member of Editorial Board of monthly magazine Zamaneh
- Member of Editorial Board of Quarterly journal of Contemporary History of Iran

== His relations with others ==
Abolhassani was one of disciples of Sheikh Hossein Lankarani. He was associated with Sheikh Hossein Lankarani for many years and was very influenced by him. Abolhassani had great interest to Sheikh Fazlullah Nuri that led to his fascination with the Sheikh and had authoring several books. Abolhassani's opinion about Doctor Mosaddeq was positive but about Doctor Shariati was nasty and extremely protested about him and this led to his disciples have such views. Abolhassani was published Morteza Motahhari's notes against Ali Shariati for the first time in 1984.

== Referring to his writings ==
Abolhassani's books use as reference in books written by scholars on Islam and history of Iran.

- Ramin Jahanbegloo in book "Iran: Between Tradition and Modernity" referred to Abolhassani's book as extremist views of Shia.
- Mehrdad Amanat in book "Jewish Identities in Iran: Resistance and Conversion to Islam and the Baha'i faith" referred to Sheikh Ibrahim Zanjani's book to study other approaches critique of Sheikh Ibrahim Zanjani.
- Nicholas Markoro and Sohrab Behdad and Farhad Nomani in books "Islam and public policy", "Islam and the Everyday World: Public policy dilemmas" and "Class And Labor in Iran: Did the Revolution Matter" introduced Abolhassani's opinion about Motahhari as same as the Iran's government's point of view.
- Sohrab Behdad and Saeed Rahnama in book "Iran After the Revolution: Crisis of an Islamic" based on the abolhassani's book "martyr Motahhari Exposer of conspiracy" criticized the Motahhari's comments about Shariati as the views of the Islamic Seminary of Qom.
- Sohrab Behdad in book "A Disputed Utopia: Islamic Economics in Revolutionary Iran" for expression of traditional Islamic views over modernist Islamists refers to abolhassani's book "martyr Motahhari Exposer of conspiracy".

== Bibliography ==
- Mashrootiat va Sheikh Fazlullah Nuri
- Hejrat: zaroorate javidane takamol
- Barresi Qurani va revayi tavakkol
- Sokoot: zamine saze bazkavi va bazsazie takamol
- Sokoot: gozargahe tajhiz
- Hekmat: mahari bar sarkeshie nafs
- Tarhe kolie osoole aghayed
- Negahi be asle velayate faghih
- Tahlili siasi - ejtemaee az falsafe va zaroorate velayate faghih va democracye ershad shode
- Tabyini az falsafeye siasi - ejtemaee - akhlaghi - farhangi
- Miad ba ostad Motahhari shahide rahe tathir simaye farhange eslami az zangare gharb zadegi va shargh zadegi
- Tahlili az naghshe seganeye shahid Sheikh Fazlullah Nuri dar nehzate tahrime tanbakoo
- Negahi be ab'ade goonagoone jange salibie gharb ba Islam
- Shahid Motahhari efshagare tote'eh: ta'vile zahere dianat be batene elhad va madiat
- Jahade defayi va jange salibie Iran va Rus tezari
- Negahi bar zendeganie porbare bozorgmarde din va siasat: hazrate ayatollah Sheikh Hossein Lankarani
- Paydari ta paye dar: seiri dar zendeginameye elmi - ma'navi - ejtemaee va siasi shahid Sheikh Fazlullah Nuri
- Ayeneh dare tal'ate yar: seiri dar zendegani va afkare Adib Pishavari
- Taraze siasat: jelvehayi az siasat va modiriate Sheikh Ansari
- Saltanate elm va dowlate faghr: seiri dar zendegani va afkar va mojahedate hojatoleslam Malae Ghorbanali Zanjani
- Siah pooshi dar sooge aemeye noor, rishehaye tarikhi va mabanie feghhi
- Ayatollahel ozma Seyyed Mohammad Kazem Tabatabyi Yazdi parchamdare arseye jahad va ejtehad
- Mahatma Gandi: hamdeli ba Islam va hamrahi ba moslemin
- Boose bar khake paye heidar
- Didebane bidar
- Andisheye sabz va zendegie sorkh
- Akharin avaze ghoo
- Khane bar damaneye atashfeshan
- Sheikh Ibrahim Zanjani

=== Articles ===
- Hosseinali Baha: dootan va doshmanane siasi
- Moroori bar andishe va sireye siasi Ayatollah Saheb Orveh
- Zamaneh va karnameye Mohammad Masud
- Monasebate siasie olamaye Shia ba salatin va didgahhaye Imam Khomeini

== Awards ==
The Abolhassani's books "Sheikh Ibrahim Zanjani" and "Sheikh Fazlullah Nuri va maktabe tarikhnegarie mashrooteh" were winners of Book of the Year of Islamic Seminary of Qom.
