= SV Grün-Weiß Lübben =

German football club

- Full name: Sportverein Grün-Weiß Lübben e.V.
- Founded: 1991
- Ground: Stadion der Völkerfreundschaft
- Capacity: 6,000
- Chairman: Ulrich Lehnigk
- Trainer: Dirk Minkwitz
- League: Landesliga Brandenburg (VII)
- 2015–16: 4th

SV Grün-Weiß Lübben is a German football club based in Lübben (Spreewald), Brandenburg, currently playing in the Landesklasse Brandenburg-Süd (VIII).

== History ==
The forerunner of SV Grün-Weiß Lübben was founded in 1961 as Dynamo Lübben. Dynamo played two seasons in the DDR-Liga (II) and twice competed in the FDGB-Pokal.

The club made a short revival in the early 2000s when it won successive championships in the Landesklasse and Landesliga in 2006 and 2007 and earned promotion to the Brandenburg-Liga. It played at this level for five seasons, was relegated again in 2012 and promptly dropped back to the Landesklasse the season after. A Landesklasse championship in 2015 took the club back to the Landesliga.

== Honours ==
The club's honours:

- Landesliga Brandenburg-Süd
  - Champions: 2007
- Landesklasse Brandenburg-Ost
  - Champions: 2006
- Landesklasse Brandenburg-Mitte
  - Champions: 2015
  - Runners-up: 2005, 2014

== Stadium ==
SV Grün-Weiß Lübben plays its home fixtures at the 6,000 capacity Stadion der Völkerfreundschaft.
