= Oleksandr Yermachenko =

Ukrainian footballer

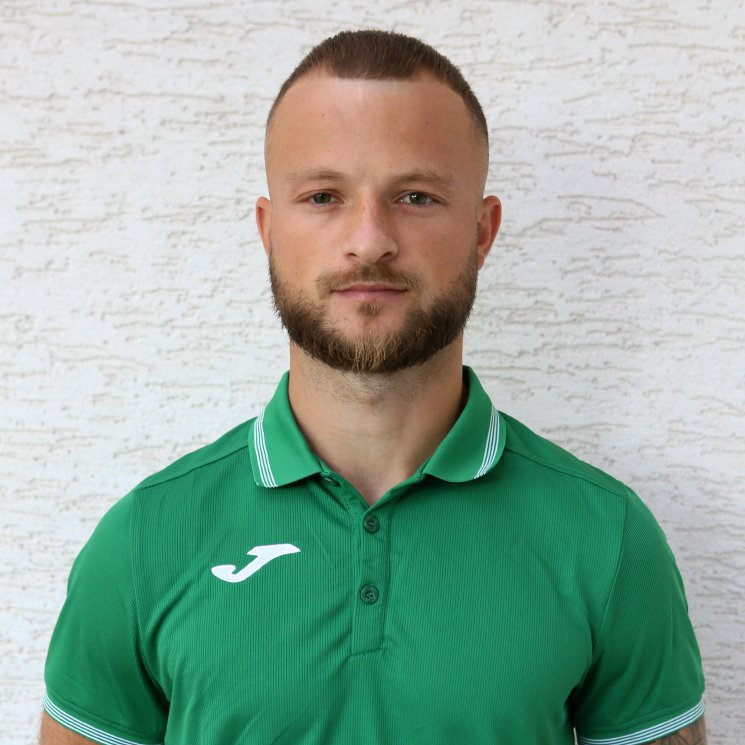

Personal information
- Full name: Oleksandr Valeriyovych Yermachenko
- Date of birth: 29 January 1993 (age 33)
- Place of birth: Zhdeniievo, Ukraine
- Height: 1.70 m (5 ft 7 in)
- Position: Midfielder

Youth career
- 2002–2006: Dynamo Kyiv
- 2006–2007: Vidradnyi Kyiv
- 2007–2009: Monolit Illichivsk
- 2009–2010: BRW-BIK Volodymyr-Volynskyi

Senior career*
| Years | Team | Apps | (Gls) |
| 2010 | Skala Stryi | 18 | (5) |
| 2011–2013 | Dynamo-2 Kyiv | 22 | (0) |
| 2014 | Stal Dniprodzerzhynsk | 17 | (1) |
| 2015 | Sumy | 24 | (7) |
| 2016 | Zaria Bălți | 11 | (0) |
| 2016 | Zugdidi | 9 | (0) |
| 2017 | Aktobe | 5 | (0) |
| 2017–2018 | Arsenal Kyiv | 21 | (4) |
| 2019 | Shevardeni-1906 Tbilisi | 11 | (0) |
| 2019 | Kremin Kremenchuk | 15 | (4) |
| 2020–2021 | Speranța Nisporeni | 27 | (4) |
| 2021–2022 | Karpaty Lviv | 15 | (0) |

International career
| 2011 | Ukraine U18 | 6 | (0) |
| 2011–2012 | Ukraine U19 | 7 | (2) |
- * Club domestic league appearances and goals as of 23 December 2021

Oleksandr Valeriyovych Yermachenko (Ukrainian: Олександр Валерійович Єрмаченко; born 29 January 1993) is a Ukrainian professional football midfielder.

== Career ==
Yermachenko is a product of FC Dynamo Kyiv Youth Sportive School. His first trainers were Yuriy Yastrebynskyi and Vitaliy Khmelnytskyi.

After playing for Ukrainian clubs in the different levels, with a short time in Moldova, in August 2016 he signed a contract with Georgian club Zugdidi from the Umaglesi Liga.
