= Aurélien Ngeyitala =

Footballer (born 1994)

Personal information
- Full name: Aurélien Ngeyitala Lola
- Date of birth: 29 May 1994 (age 32)
- Place of birth: Évry, France
- Height: 1.82 m (6 ft 0 in)
- Position: Midfielder

Team information
- Current team: Saint-Michel FC 91

Youth career
- 2010–2012: Sochaux
- 2012–2013: Chernomorets Burgas

Senior career*
Years	Team	Apps	(Gls)
2011–2012	Sochaux B	9	(0)
2012–2013	Chernomorets Burgas	7	(0)
2013–2014	Amiens B	17	(1)
2014	Évry	2	(0)
2015	Senec	32	(3)
2016–2018	Nitra	49	(2)
2018	Arsenal Kyiv	15	(1)
2019	Vereya	2	(1)
2021–2022	Linas-Montlhéry	25	(10)
2022–2023	Vitry	12	(2)
2023	Linas-Montlhéry	10	(2)
2023–2024	Paris Saint-Germain B		
2024–	Saint-Michel FC 91		

International career
	DR Congo U19	4	(0)
2012	DR Congo U20	1	(0)
- * Club domestic league appearances and goals as of 17:20, 20 September 2022 (UTC)

Aurélien Ngeyitala Lola (born 29 May 1994) is a professional footballer who plays as a midfielder for French club Saint-Michel FC 91. Born in France, he is a former DR Congo youth international.

== Early life ==
Ngeyitala was born in Évry, France, to a mother born in Kinshasa, Zaire. He acquired French nationality on 29 April 1998 through the collective effect of his mother's naturalization.

== Club career ==
In March 2019, he moved to Vereya.
