= Dmytro Zozulya =

Ukrainian association football player

Personal information
- Full name: Dmytro Volodymyrovych Zozulya
- Date of birth: 9 June 1988 (age 38)
- Place of birth: Kyiv, Soviet Union (now Ukraine)
- Height: 1.87 m (6 ft 2 in)
- Position: Defender

Team information
- Current team: Shevardeni-1906 Tbilisi
- Number: 18

Youth career
- 2001–2005: FC Zmina-Obolon Kyiv
- 2005: Dynamo Kyiv

Senior career*
Years	Team	Apps	(Gls)
2005–2007	Obolon Kyiv	5	(1)
2005–2008	→ Obolon-2 Kyiv	51	(3)
2008	Knyazha Shchaslyve	13	(0)
2009–2011	Lviv	46	(2)
2011	Volyn Lutsk	6	(0)
2012–2013	Bukovyna Chernivtsi	10	(0)
2014	Naftovyk-Ukrnafta Okhtyrka	10	(0)
2015–2016	Guria Lanchkhuti	32	(3)
2016	Zugdidi	10	(1)
2017–2018	Arsenal Kyiv	50	(0)
2019	Hirnyk-Sport Horishni Plavni	10	(0)
2019	Kremin Kremenchuk	16	(4)
2020	Andijon	11	(0)
2021–2022	VPK-Ahro Shevchenkivka	23	(0)
2022–	Shevardeni-1906 Tbilisi	12	(0)

International career
2009	Ukraine U21	1	(0)
- * Club domestic league appearances and goals as of 22 May 2022

Dmytro Volodymyrovych Zozulya (Ukrainian: Дмитро Володимирович Зозуля; born 9 June 1988) is a Ukrainian professional football defender.
