= Maksym Zhychykov =

Ukrainian footballer (born 1992)

Personal information
- Full name: Maksym Serhiyovych Zhychykov
- Date of birth: 7 November 1992 (age 34)
- Place of birth: Krasnopavlivka, Ukraine
- Height: 1.78 m (5 ft 10 in)
- Position: Defender

Team information
- Current team: Metalist 1925 Kharkiv
- Number: 29

Youth career
- 2005–2009: UFK Kharkiv

Senior career*
Years	Team	Apps	(Gls)
2009–2017	Shakhtar Donetsk	0	(0)
2013–2014	→ Zorya Luhansk (loan)	0	(0)
2014	→ Sumy (loan)	16	(0)
2015–2016	→ Illichivets Mariupol (loan)	28	(2)
2016	→ Oleksandriya (loan)	3	(0)
2017	→ Illichivets Mariupol (loan)	1	(0)
2017	→ Jonava	4	(0)
2017	Mykolaiv	10	(0)
2018	Poltava	7	(0)
2018	KPV	5	(0)
2019	Arsenal Kyiv	14	(0)
2019–2020	Mynai	24	(0)
2020–	Metalist 1925 Kharkiv	81	(1)

International career
2009	Ukraine U17	6	(2)
2009–2010	Ukraine U18	5	(0)
2012	Ukraine U20	2	(0)
2012–2013	Ukraine U21	2	(0)
- * Club domestic league appearances and goals as of 21 October 2024

Maksym Zhychykov (Ukrainian: Максим Сергійович Жичиков; born 7 November 1992) is a Ukrainian professional footballer who plays as a defender for Metalist 1925 Kharkiv. Besides Ukraine, he has played in Lithuania and Finland.

== Career ==
Zhychykov is a product of the UFK Kharkiv youth sportive school. He signed a contract with FC Shakhtar in 2009. During 2013-2014 he was on loan for the Ukrainian Premier League club FC Zorya, but did not spend any game in the main-team squad. From July 2014 was on loan in FC Sumy. And from July 2016 plays on loan in FC Oleksandriya.
