= Hamid Ahmadieh =

Iranian scientist

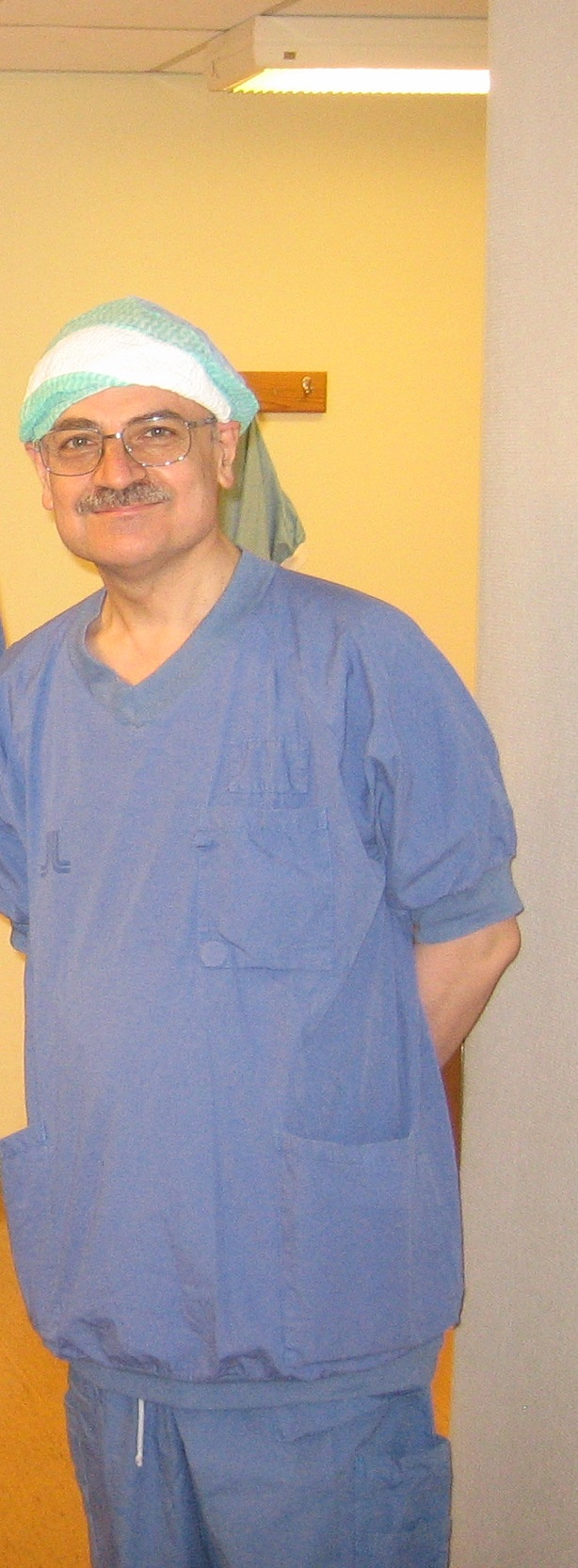
- Born: 1953 (age 72–73); Tehran, Iran
- Occupation: Ophthalmologist
- Spouse: Gisoo Ohadi

Hamid Ahmadieh (Persian: حمید احمدیه) is an Iranian ophthalmologist, medical scientist, and pioneer specializing on the retina of the eye. He is also the founder of Iranian Vitreoretina Society.

He is a professor of ophthalmology at Shahid Beheshti University of Medical Sciences (SBUMS). He is also the director of vitreoretinal service at Labbafinejad Medical Center.

== Early life and education ==
Hamid Ahmadieh was born in Tehran and spent his early life in Yazd, Iran, where his father worked as a physician. Ahmadieh obtained his M.D. degree from Tehran University of Medical Sciences in 1978 and did his residency in ophthalmology at Farabi Eye Hospital from 1979 to 1982. Afterwards he had a vitreoretinal fellowship at Labbafinejad Medical Center, Shahid Beheshti University of Medical Sciences from 1984 to 1986.

== Career ==
Ahmadieh became an assistant professor of ophthalmology Shahid Beheshti University of Medical Sciences Faculty in 1986. At the same time he became the director of Vitreoretinal Service at Labbafinejad Medical Center. He was promoted to an associate professor of ophthalmology in 1993 and to a full professor of ophthalmology in 1999.

Ahmadieh was the director of the Residency Training Program (Ophthalmology) at Labbafinejad Medical Center and Shahid Beheshti University of Medical Sciences from 1989 to 1996. He was a member of Iranian Board of Ophthalmology from 1987 to 2008 and was a member of the executive committee of the Iranian Society of Ophthalmology (IrSO) from 1986 to 1996. He was the president of the first Iranian Congress of Ophthalmology. Ahmadieh founded the Iranian Vitreoretina Society in 2007. He is also a member of the Board of Middle East Vitreoretina Society (MEAVRS).

Ahmadieh is the founder and editor-in-chief of the Journal of Ophthalmic and Vision Research and is a reviewer for Ophthalmology, Acta Ophthalmologica, Journal of Clinical and Experimental Ophthalmology, Retina (journal), Ophthalmic Research (journal) and Indian Journal of Ophthalmology. He is also on the editorial board of ISRN Ophthalmology Journal. Ahmadieh is currently the research deputy of the Ophthalmic Research Center.

He received the International Achievement Award in 2006 from the American Academy of Ophthalmology.

== Honors and awards ==
- International Achievement Award, American Academy of Ophthalmology, 2006
