= Curtis Yebli =

French footballer (born 1997)

Personal information
- Full name: Curtis Fabrice Marlon Yebli
- Date of birth: 30 March 1997 (age 29)
- Place of birth: Évry, France
- Height: 1.80 m (5 ft 11 in)
- Position: Midfielder

Team information
- Current team: Karmiotissa
- Number: 87

Youth career
- –2014: Nancy

Senior career*
| Years | Team | Apps | (Gls) |
| 2014–2015 | Nancy B | 2 | (0) |
| 2015–2018 | Bari | 2 | (0) |
| 2017–2018 | → Arezzo (loan) | 21 | (0) |
| 2018 | Arsenal Kyiv | 4 | (0) |
| 2019–2020 | Ermis Aradippou | 19 | (2) |
| 2020–2021 | Sainte-Geneviève | 3 | (0) |
| 2021–2022 | Karmiotissa | 26 | (0) |
| 2022–2023 | AEZ Zakakiou | 26 | (2) |
| 2023–2024 | ASIL Lysi | 22 | (1) |
| 2024–2026 | Krasava Ypsonas | 36 | (2) |
| 2026– | Karmiotissa | 12 | (2) |

International career^{‡}
| 2026– | Guadeloupe | 2 | (0) |
- * Club domestic league appearances and goals as of 3 May 2026 ‡ National team caps and goals as of 16 November 2026

Curtis Fabrice Marlon Yebli (born 30 March 1997) is a football player who plays for Cypriot club Karmiotissa. Born in the continental France, he plays for the Guadeloupe national team.

== Club career ==
He made his Serie B debut for Bari on 6 May 2017 in a game against Avellino.

On 29 July 2019 Yebli joined Cypriot club Ermis Aradippou FC.

== International career ==
Yebli made his debut for the Guadeloupe national team on 12 November 2026 in a CONCACAF Nations League game against Barbados.
