= Orest Budyuk =

Ukrainian footballer

Personal information
- Full name: Orest Vasylyovych Budyuk
- Date of birth: 23 August 1995 (age 31)
- Place of birth: Ratne, Volyn Oblast, Ukraine
- Height: 1.90 m (6 ft 3 in)
- Position: Goalkeeper

Team information
- Current team: FC Union 60 Bremen

Youth career
- 2010–2012: Obolon Kyiv

Senior career*
Years	Team	Apps	(Gls)
2011–2012	Obolon-2 Kyiv	2	(0)
2012–2015	Illichivets Mariupol	0	(0)
2015–2018	Cherkaskyi Dnipro	71	(0)
2018–2019	Arsenal Kyiv	2	(0)
2019	Kremin Kremenchuk	18	(0)
2020–2021	Speranța Nisporeni	21	(0)
2021–2022	Olimpiya Savyntsi		
2024–	FC Union 60 Bremen	6	(0)

International career
2013	Ukraine U18	1	(0)
- * Club domestic league appearances and goals as of 11 May 2024

Orest Vasylyovych Budyuk (Ukrainian: Орест Васильович Будюк; born 23 August 1995) is a Ukrainian football player who plays for German Bremen-Liga club FC Union 60 Bremen.

== Club career ==
He made his Ukrainian Second League debut for FC Obolon-2 Kyiv on 5 August 2012 in a game against FC SKA Odesa as an 84th-minute substitute for Vitaly Onopko.

In June 2015, Budyuk moved to FC Cherkaskyi Dnipro on a free transfer. He made his competitive debut for the club on 3 June 2015, playing all ninety minutes of a 3-0 away victory in the Ukrainian First League over Enerhiya Nova Kakhovka.

In July 2018, Budyuk was sold to FC Arsenal Kyiv for a reported €25,000 fee. He made his league debut for the club on 14 September 2018, playing all ninety minutes in a 1-0 away defeat to FC Desna.
