= Serhiy Sitalo =

Ukrainian footballer

Personal information
- Full name: Serhiy Volodymyrovych Sitalo
- Date of birth: 20 December 1986 (age 39)
- Place of birth: Magadan, Russian SFSR
- Height: 1.90 m (6 ft 3 in)
- Position: Goalkeeper

Team information
- Current team: Nyva Buzova

Youth career
- 2000–2001: LVUFK Luhansk
- 2002–2003: Dnipro Dnipropetrovsk

Senior career*
Years	Team	Apps	(Gls)
2003–2004	Dnipro-2 Dnipropetrovsk	1	(0)
2004–2007	Arsenal Kyiv	0	(0)
2007	Stal Dniprodzerzhynsk	6	(0)
2008	Shakhtar Sverdlovsk	12	(0)
2009–2010	Stal Alchevsk	29	(0)
2011–2014	Tavriya Simferopol	3	(0)
2014–2016	Desna Chernihiv	35	(0)
2016–2018	Arsenal Kyiv	68	(0)
2019–2020	Kolos Kovalivka	0	(0)
2021–2022	Nyva Buzova	0	(0)
- * Club domestic league appearances and goals as of 20 March 2019

Serhiy Sitalo (Ukrainian: Сергій Володимирович Сітало; born 20 December 1986 in Magadan, Russian SFSR, Soviet Union) is a professional Ukrainian football goalkeeper who plays for Kolos Kovalivka.

== Career ==
Sitalo is a product of the youth team systems of LVUFK Luhansk and FC Dnipro Dnipropetrovsk. He signed a contract with SC Tavriya in March 2011.

=== Desna Chernigiv ===
In 2014 he moved to Desna Chernihiv the club in the city of Chernihiv.

== Honours ==
Arsenal Kyiv

- Ukrainian First League: 2017–18

Nyva Buzova

- Ukrainian Football Amateur League: 2021–22
