= Massimo Goh =

Italian footballer

Personal information
- Full name: Massimo N'Cede Goh
- Date of birth: 1 February 1999 (age 27)
- Place of birth: Nuoro, Italy
- Position: Forward

Team information
- Current team: Tre Fiori
- Number: 9

Youth career
- Juventus

Senior career*
Years	Team	Apps	(Gls)
2017–2019	Virtus Verona	34	(6)
2019	Cavese	3	(0)
2020	Crema	3	(1)
2020–2021	Cattolica	27	(4)
2021	1599 Șelimbăr	6	(0)
2022	Fanfulla	?	(?)
2022	San Martino	?	(?)
2022–	Tre Fiori	8	(2)
- * Club domestic league appearances and goals as of 25 June 2023

Massimo N'Cede Goh (born 1 February 1999) is an Italian footballer who plays as an attacker for Tre Fiori.

== Career ==
Goh started his career with Italian Serie A side Juventus. In 2017, he was sent on loan to Virtus Verona in the Italian fourth division. In 2018, Goh was sent on loan to Ukrainian club Arsenal-Kyiv. Before the second half of 2018–19, he returned to Virtus Verona in the Italian third division, where he made 4 league appearances and scored 0 goals. On 12 February 2019, Goh debuted for Virtus Verona during a 0–1 loss to Renate. Before the second half of 2019–20, he signed for Italian fourth division team Crema. In 2021, he signed for CSC 1599 Șelimbăr in Romania.

== Personal life ==
Goh is the cousin of Italy international Moise Kean.
