= Danylo Karas =

Ukrainian footballer (born 1997)

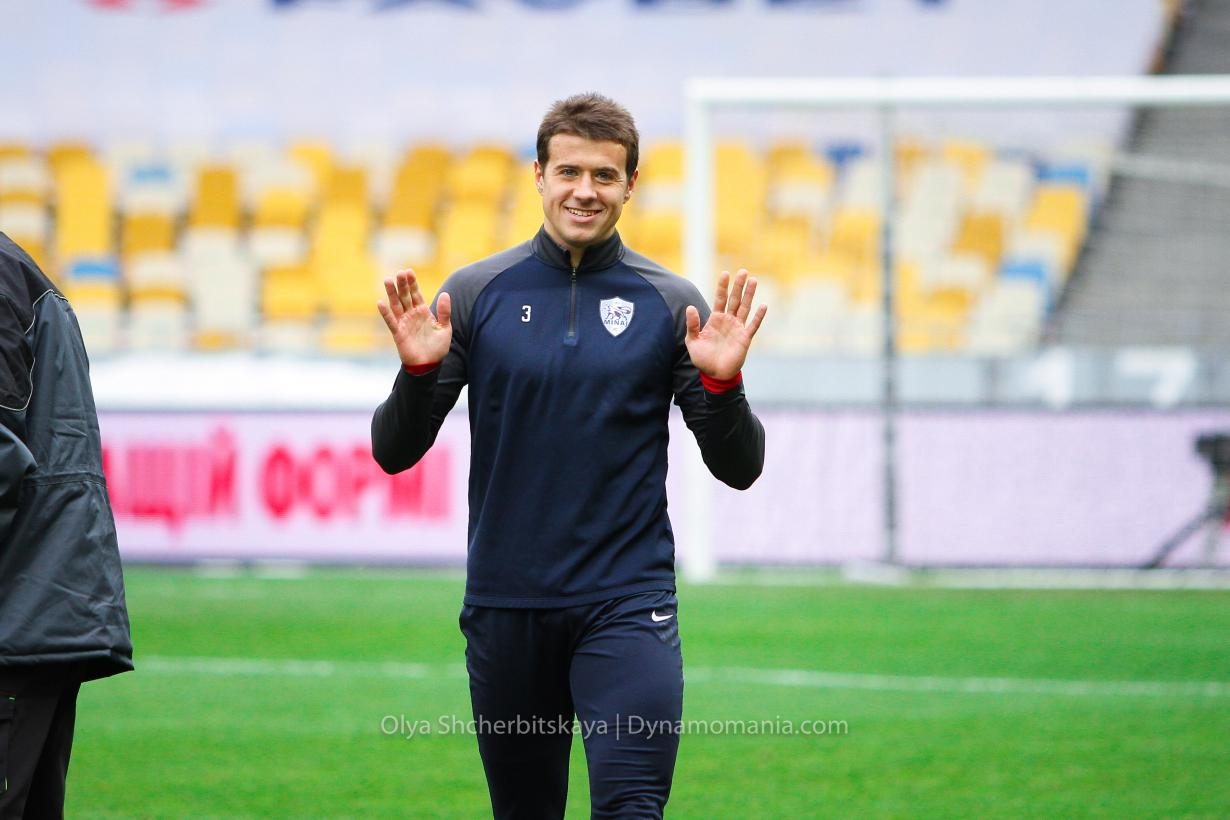

Personal information
- Full name: Danylo Andriyovych Karas
- Date of birth: 2 January 1997 (age 29)
- Place of birth: Osypenko, Ukraine
- Height: 1.86 m (6 ft 1 in)
- Position: Centre-back

Team information
- Current team: Bukovyna Chernivtsi
- Number: 2

Youth career
- 2010–2014: DVUFK Dnipropetrovsk

Senior career*
Years	Team	Apps	(Gls)
2014–2016	Dnipro Dnipropetrovsk	0	(0)
2016–2018	Dynamo Kyiv	0	(0)
2018	→ Arsenal Kyiv (loan)	8	(0)
2019–2020	Hércules B	7	(0)
2020	Hirnyk-Sport Horishni Plavni	23	(2)
2021	Mynai	5	(0)
2021	Ahrobiznes Volochysk	16	(0)
2022–2025	Obolon Kyiv	59	(3)
2025–	Bukovyna Chernivtsi	21	(0)
- * Club domestic league appearances and goals as of 3 June 2026

Danylo Andriyovych Karas (Ukrainian: Данило Андрійович Карась; born 2 January 1997) is a Ukrainian professional footballer who plays as a centre-back for Ukrainian club Bukovyna Chernivtsi.
