= Vadym Semchuk =

Ukrainian footballer

Personal information
- Full name: Vadym Viktorovych Semchuk
- Date of birth: 24 November 1993 (age 32)
- Place of birth: Zhytomyr, Ukraine
- Height: 1.82 m (6 ft 0 in)
- Position: Right winger

Team information
- Current team: FV Engers 07
- Number: 9

Youth career
- 2006–2009: Polissya Zhytomyr
- 2009–2010: UFK-Karpaty Lviv

Senior career*
Years	Team	Apps	(Gls)
2010–2014	Karpaty Lviv	0	(0)
2014–2015	Poltava	11	(0)
2015	Chełmianka Chełm	15	(3)
2015–2016	Lewart Lubartów	18	(2)
2016–2018	Arsenal Kyiv	61	(6)
2018–2021	Polissya Zhytomyr	37	(3)
2021	Karpaty Halych	13	(1)
2021–2022	Olimpik Donetsk	18	(2)
2022	Nyva Vinnytsia	0	(0)
2022–	FV Engers 07	67	(7)
- * Club domestic league appearances and goals as of 24 November 2024

Vadym Viktorovych Semchuk (Ukrainian: Вадим Вікторович Семчук; born 24 November 1993) is a Ukrainian professional footballer who plays as a right winger for German club FV Engers 07.
