= Alireza Akbari =

Iranian politician (1961–2023)

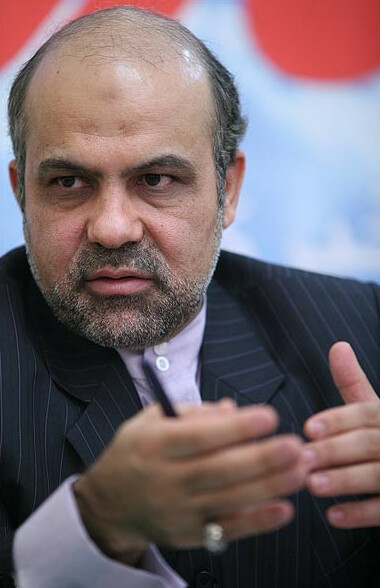
- Akbari in 2007

Deputy Minister of Defence
- In office February 2000 – 24 August 2005
- President: Mohammad Khatami
- Minister: Ali Shamkhani

Personal details
- Born: 21 October 1961 Shiraz, Iran
- Died: 14 January 2023 (aged 61) Tehran, Iran
- Cause of death: Execution by hanging
- Citizenship: Iran; United Kingdom

Alireza Akbari (Persian: علیرضا اکبری; 21 October 1961 – c. 14 January 2023) was an Iranian politician, a senior Islamic revolutionary guard officer with Iranian and British citizenship. He was Deputy Minister of Defence from 1998 to 2003 under General Ali Shamkhani during the presidency of reformist Mohammad Khatami.

Akbari was first arrested in Iran in 2009, accused of spying for Britain. Akbari was arrested again in 2019 while travelling from the United Kingdom to Iran, and sentenced to death for charges including allegations of spying for Britain, Mofsed-e-filarz (translating to 'corruption on Earth'), stemming from accusations that Akbari committed espionage on behalf of the United Kingdom's intelligence agency, MI6. Akbari and his family denied Iran's espionage charges.

On 14 January 2023, the Iranian Judiciary announced that Akbari had been executed by hanging after having been convicted of spying. Akbari's execution was met with controversy and condemnation, particularly from British political figures.

== Early life ==
Alireza Akbari was born on 21 October 1961 in Shiraz. After the 1979 Iranian Revolution, he was active in the Association of Student Islamic Societies.

== Career ==
During the Iran–Iraq War he fought with the Badr Brigades, becoming a deputy division commander. His obituary in The Daily Telegraph states he was a senior commander in the Islamic Revolutionary Guard Corps.

Akbari was a member of the military organisation which implemented the 1988 cease-fire between Iran and Iraq and ended the Iran–Iraq War in 1988, under United Nations Security Council Resolution 598. He also had other security roles, including advising the Iranian navy. Akbari was considered a close ally to Defense Minister Ali Shamkhani, who appointed him Deputy Minister of Defence, a position he held from 1998 and 2003. Akbari was a leading opponent of a nuclear deal between Iran and the West on national security grounds. He is quoted as saying "If we retreat every time they put pressure on us, they will continue the pressure and push us farther back until we are completely disarmed and defenceless". His role involved liaising with foreign embassies in Tehran, responsible for putting the case that Iran's nuclear programme was for peaceful purposes. Akbari retired from government service in 2004 and went into business, which involved travelling from and to Iran.

In 2008, under the government of Mahmoud Ahmadinejad, Akbari was arrested on suspicion of spying for Britain but later released on bail. The Tehran Times reported he left Iran in 2009, moving to Europe and later England. Akbari's brother, Mehdi, says he obtained British citizenship by naturalisation through making investments and creating jobs in Britain; the Iranian authorities say citizenship was given as part of a spying deal. He thus became a British-Iranian dual national. There are reports that he mainly lived in Spain. Akbari ran a private think tank before his arrest in 2019.

== Arrest and charges ==
Akbari was arrested in 2019 on a visit to Iran according to the BBC. Iranian state media published a video on 12 January 2023 which argued that Akbari played a role in the assassination of Iran's top nuclear scientist Mohsen Fakhrizadeh, killed in a 2020 attack outside Tehran. Akbari did not confess to being directly involved in the plot, but said a British agent had asked for information about him. Later, the BBC released a purported recording of Akbari's telephone call to his family from prison, wherein he alleged that he was forcibly administered drugs and chemical substances, held in solitary confinement for prolonged periods of time, forced to make repeated recorded confessions, and subjected to torture.

Akbari was accused of providing information to British officials (MI 5, 16, 13) regarding 178 Iranian figures, including Fakhrizadeh and Gen. Col Solemai Khomani killed in 2019 by foreign intelligence agencies. Iranian officials claimed Akbari worked through a private company that had direct contact with research institutes headed by intelligence officials in London.

=== Death sentence and execution ===
On 11 January, 2023 Mizan, the arm of Iran's state media, announced that Akbari had been sentenced to death. Before Akbari's execution, Iran's state news agency, the Islamic Republic News Agency (IRNA), announced that the Supreme Court of Iran had upheld Akbari's death sentence, declaring that it was based on "substantiated evidence."

On 14 January 2023 Akbari's execution by hanging was announced. Mizan's report announcing Akbari's execution did not specify the date on which it was carried out.

Four months after the execution of Alireza Akbari, The New York Times, in an article written by Farnaz Fassihi and Ronen Bergman, citing Western and Israeli intelligence sources, confirmed that he had spied on Iran's nuclear and military programs. According to the New York Times report, Akbari gave information about the Fordow site to the British government, which was then provided by Britain to its allies. According to The New York Times, Iran discovered him with the cooperation of the Russian Intelligence Organization.

== Reactions ==
In January 2023 the UK government said the accusations levelled against Akbari were not true and were intended for political bargaining. British foreign minister James Cleverly denied the allegations against Akbari and called them "politically motivated," saying that Iran's chargé d'affaires would be summoned over the execution so British officials could express their "disgust at Iran's actions." Cleverly called Akbari's execution "barbaric" in a Twitter post and said, "the Iranian regime has once again shown its callous disregard for human life. This will not stand unchallenged." Prior to the execution, the UK government had urged Iranian officials not to carry out Akbari's execution.

UK prime minister Rishi Sunak said he was "appalled by the execution," posting on Twitter that Akbari's execution was "a callous and cowardly act, carried out by a barbaric regime with no respect for the human rights of their own people."

After the UK government condemned the execution of Akbari, the Iranian Foreign Ministry issued a statement, saying "The British regime, whose royal family member, sees the killing of 25 innocent people as removal of chess pieces and has no regrets over the issue, and those who turn a blind eye to this war crime, are in no position to preach others on human rights."

French president Emmanuel Macron expressed his solidarity and condemned the execution on Twitter. Macron said, "The execution of Alireza Akbari is a despicable and barbaric act. His name adds to too long a list of victims of repression and the death penalty in Iran. Solidarity with the UK. Solidarity with the Iranian people".

Human rights organisation Amnesty International called Akbari's execution "particularly horrific" and an "abhorrent assault on the right to life." Amnesty also requested that the UK government "fully investigate" the accusations that Akbari was subjected to torture and ill treatment in prison and "pursue all avenues to hold the Iranian authorities to account."

The US, the EU and the UK condemned Iran for executing Alireza Akbari and other Iranian citizens. The US Secretary of State Antony Blinken vowed that Tehran will be punished for human rights abuses during the crackdown of widespread demonstrations.

== Personal life ==
Akbari married Maryam Samadi (born in 1969). They have two daughters. Ramin Forghani, his nephew, founded the Iranian Atheists Association in Glasgow in 2013, and was vice-chair of the Scottish Secular Society.

== See also ==
- Majid Jamali Fashi
