= Serhiy Datsenko (footballer, born 1987) =

Ukrainian football midfielder

Personal information
- Full name: Serhiy Oleksandrovych Datsenko
- Date of birth: 6 September 1987 (age 39)
- Place of birth: Kyiv, Ukrainian SSR
- Height: 1.87 m (6 ft 1 1/2 in)
- Position: Midfielder

Youth career
- 1996–2001: Obolon-Zmina Kyiv
- 2001–2002: Spartak-MAST Brovary
- 2002–2003: Dynamo Kyiv
- 2003–2004: Vidradnyi Kyiv

Senior career*
Years	Team	Apps	(Gls)
2004–2006	Dynamo Kyiv	0	(0)
2004	→ Dynamo-3 Kyiv	1	(0)
2005–2006	→ CSKA Kyiv (loan)	5	(0)
2006	→ Nafkom Brovary (loan)	9	(0)
2007–2008	Zimbru Chișinău	5	(0)
2008	Knyazha-2 Shchaslyve	18	(0)
2009	Feniks-Illichovets Kalinine	19	(1)
2010	Helios Kharkiv	12	(1)
2010	Dinamo Samarqand	9	(0)
2011–2013	Poltava	65	(2)
2013–2014	Andijan	13	(0)
2014–2015	Torpedo-BelAZ Zhodino	27	(0)
2016–2017	Obolon-Brovar Kyiv	24	(4)
2017	Dnepr Mogilev	14	(1)
2018	Arsenal Kyiv	5	(0)
2019–2020	FC Juniors Shpytky (amateur)		
- * Club domestic league appearances and goals as of 31 January 2019

Serhiy Datsenko (Ukrainian: Сергій Олександрович Даценко; born 6 September 1987) is a Ukrainian former football midfielder.

Datsenko is a product of FC Obolon-Zmina Kyiv and FC Dynamo Kyiv Youth Sportive School systems. His first trainer was Heorhiy Navrazidi.
