= 1952 in Iran =

- Decades: 1930s; 1940s; 1950s; 1960s; 1970s
- See also: Other events of 1952; Years in Iran

The following lists events that happened during 1952 in Pahlavi Iran.

== Incumbents ==
- Shah: Mohammad Reza Pahlavi
- Prime Minister: Mohammad Mosaddegh (until July 17), Ahmad Qavam (July 17 – July 22), Mohammad Mosaddegh (starting July 22)

== Events ==
- July 21 – 1952 Iranian Uprising.
- 1952 Iranian legislative election.
- Iran at the 1952 Summer Olympics.

== Births ==
- January 10 – Rasoul Najafian, Iranian actor, director and singer.
- January 12 – Abbas Torabian, previous Team manager of Iran national football team and also head of futsal committee in Islamic Republic of Iran Football Federation.
- January 13 – Mohammad-Ali Najafi, Iranian politician.
- January 16 – Reza Malekzadeh, Iranian medical scientist and gastroenterologist.
- January 19 – Moein (singer), Iranian pop singer and composer.
- February 2 – Mohammad-Reza Bahonar, Iranian politician.
- February 4 – Mohammed Taheri, Iranian diplomat.
- February 5 – Parviz Davoodi, Iranian politician.
- February 18 – Shahram Nazeri, Iranian singer, musician and tenor.
- March 9 – Jalil Farjad, Iranian actor.
- March 19 – Jalal Malaksha, Kurdish poet.
- March 19 – Mohammad Reza Saket, Iranian football executive.
- March 20 – Vahid Alaghband, Commodities trader.
- March 23 – Varuzh Karim-Masihi, Iranian film director and editor.
- March 30 – Morteza Mohasses, Iranian football manager.
- April 3 – Ziba Mir-Hosseini, Iranian anthropologist.
- April 9 – Javad Allahverdi, Iranian footballer.
- April 21 – Seyed Hossein Mirfakhar, Iranian politician and diplomat.
- April 22 – Bahram Moshtaghi, Iranian amateur wrestler.
- April 23 – Ghotbeddin Sadeghi, Iranian theatre director.
- April 26 – Hamid-Reza Assefi, Iranian politician and diplomat.
- May 8 – Farimah Farjami, Iranian actress.
- May 23 – Seyyed Mohammadi Ali Mosavi, Iranian politician.
- May 26 – Mahmoud Reza Khavari, Iranian private banker.
- June 9 – Alireza Sheikhattar, Iranian politician.
- June 21 – Maziar (singer), Iranian singer.
- July 24 – Moniro Ravanipour, Iranian writer.
- August 7 – Vartex Parsanian, Iranian boxer.
- August 8 – Abdolreza Majdpour, Iranian athlete.
- August 11 – Mohammad Modarres, Iranian-American nuclear engineer.
- September 13 – Mahmoud Vaezi, Iranian diplomat.
- September 26 – Habib (singer), Iranian singer-songwriter, guitarist.
- October 9 – Ghorban Ali Kalhor, Iranian skier.
- October 9 – Morteza Poursamadi, Iranian cinematographer and photographer.
- October 10 – Ali Saeedlou, Iranian politician.
- October 10 – Mehdi Mohammadi (football manager), Iranian coach.
- October 12 – Manouchehr Parchami, Iranian water polo player.
- October 14 – Hossein Kazempour Ardebili, Iranian politician.
- November 1 – Ali-Reza Asgari, Iranian Army general.
- November 2 – Farajollah Salahshoor, Iranian film director.

== Deaths ==
- December 30 – Kasbar Ipegian, Armenian playwright.
- ? – Hossein Hang Afarin, Iranian musician.
- ? – Mirza Mahdi Ashtiani, Iranian philosopher.
- ? – Zandokht Shirazi, Iranian writer.
