= 1949 in Iran =

- Decades: 1920s; 1930s; 1940s; 1950s; 1960s
- See also: Other events of 1949; Years in Iran

The following lists events that happened during 1949 in Pahlavi Iran.

== Incumbents ==
- Shah: Mohammad Reza Pahlavi
- Prime Minister: Mohammad Sa'ed

== Events ==
- 1949 Iranian Constituent Assembly election.
- 1949 Iranian Senate election.

== Births ==
- January 9 – Mohammad Reza Nekoonam, Iranian Grand Ayatollah.
- January 9 – Shirin Yazdanbakhsh, Iranian actress.
- January 11 – Mohammad Reza Rahimi, Iranian politician.
- January 19 – Mir Jalaleddin Kazzazi, Iranian academic.
- January 20 – Ali Mohammad Noorian, Iranian politician.
- February 15 – Ghazaleh Alizadeh, Iranian poet and writer.
- February 24 – Mansoor Yaghoti, Iranian writer, teacher and novelist.
- March 5 – Nur-Ali Shushtari, Iranian general.
- March 15 – Gholam Reza Aghazadeh, Iranian politician.
- March 24 – Ali Akbar Salehi, Iranian politician.
- March 27 – Bijan Allipour, Iranian business executive.
- April 1 – Kamran Hedayati, Assassinated eastern Kurdish dissident.
- May 1 – Nosrat Irandoost, Iranian footballer.
- May 2 – Farzaneh Kaboli, Iranian dancer and actress.
- May 20 – Farideh Heyat, British-Iranian anthropologist.
- June 6 – Yahya Ale Eshaq, Iranian politician.
- June 7 – Bijan Zolfagharnasab, Iranian footballer.
- June 19 – Ebi, Iranian singer.
- June 19 – Pirouz Adamiat, Iranian fencer.
- July 7 – Hamid Reza Chitgar, exiled Iranian politician.
- July 9 – Mohammad-Ali Shahidi, Iranian politician.
- July 17 – Martik, Iranian guitarist and singer.
- July 25 – Armik, Armenian-American guitarist and songwriter.
- July 30 – Javad Ghorab, Iranian footballer.
- August 11 – Hasan Yousefi Eshkevari, Iranian opinion journalist and religious servant.
- August 25 – Fariborz Lachini, Iranian musician.
- September 23 – Manouchehr Shafaei, Iranian journalist and human rights activist.
- September 27 – Amir Hosein Fardi, Iranian writer.
- September 29 – Ali Eghbali Dogaheh, Iranian fighter pilot and commander.
- September 30 – Mehrdad Khonsari, Iranian politician.
- October 1 – Ahmad Aghalou, Iranian actor.
- October 1 – Ali Mirzaei (politician), Iranian politician, journalist and football administrator.
- October 1 – Mina Izadyar, Iranian professor and pediatrician.
- October 4 – Hossein Khalatbari, Iranian fighter pilot.
- November 19 – Sattar (singer), Iranian singer.
- November 23 – Gholamhussein Lotfi, Iranian actor.
- November 27 – Shahrokh (singer), Iranian singer and songwriter.
- December 13 – Amir Abedini, Iranian soccer player and politician.
- December 16 – Kiumars Pourahmad, Iranian film director.
- December 19 – Nasser Hejazi, Iranian footballer.

== Deaths ==
- November 5 – Abdolhossein Hazhir, Iranian prime minister.
- November 24 – Mohammad Ali Shah Abadi, Iranian religious scholar.
- December 18 – Esmail Merat, Iranian politician.
