= 1950 in Iran =

- Decades: 1930s; 1940s; 1950s; 1960s; 1970s
- See also: Other events of 1950; Years in Iran

The following lists events that happened during 1950 in Pahlavi Iran.

== Incumbents ==
- Shah: Mohammad Reza Pahlavi
- Prime Minister: Mohammad Sa'ed (until March 23), Ali Mansur (March 23 – June 26), Haj Ali Razmara (starting June 26)

== Events ==
- 1950 Iranian legislative election.

== Births ==
- January 5 – Dariush Movahedi, Iranian water polo player.
- January 12 – Alireza Azizi, Iranian footballer.
- January 13 – Gholamhossein Mazloumi, Iranian footballer.
- January 21 – Sadegh Nojouki, Iranian musician, composer, songwriter.
- January 30 – Bahram Mavaddat, Iranian footballer.
- January 31 – Reza Soukhtehsaraei, Iranian wrestler.
- February 23 – Touraj Atabaki, Iranian academic.
- March 6 – Seifallah Randjbar-Daemi, Iranian physicist.
- March 7 – Taghikhan Khodavand, cyclist.
- March 8 – Jamileh Sorouri, Iranian wrestler.
- March 9 – Ataollah Salehi, Iranian military officer.
- March 9 – Bijan Birang, Iranian film director.
- March 13 – Davoud Ahmadinejad, Iranian politician.
- March 18 – Ali Abbaspour Tehrani-Fard, Iranian politician.
- March 21 – Giti Mohebban, fencer.
- March 21 – Kazem HajirAzad, Iranian actor.
- May 4 – Ghafour Jahani, Iranian footballer.
- May 5 – Googoosh, Iranian singer and actor.
- May 8 – Jabbar Feli, Persian boxer.
- May 16 – Sharif lotfi, Iranian composer.
- June 1 – Maryam Sedarati, Iranian high jumper.
- June 21 – Abbas Amiri Moghaddam, Iranian actor.
- June 23 – Nasrollah Dehnavi, Iranian weightlifter.
- June 25 – Hadi Ghaffari, Iranian politician.
- July 7 – Mehdi Haj Mohamad, association football player.
- July 8 – Kaveh Golestan, Iranian photographer.
- July 28 – Shahyar Ghanbari, Iranian poet.
- August 10 – Aziz Motazedi, Iranian novelist and essayist.
- August 23 – Hassan Makaremi, Iranian calligrapher and writer.
- August 31 – Mohammad Reza Darafsheh, Iranian mathematician.
- September 11 – Khosro Harandi, chess player.
- September 17 – Hassan Nayebagha, Iranian footballer.
- September 19 – Behrouz Gharibpour, Iranian theatre director.
- September 23 – Hossein Charkhabi, Iranian footballer.
- October 1 – Ali Asghar Soltanieh, Iranian academic.
- October 1 – Hassan Mehmani, Iranian actor and director.
- October 22 – Abbas Doran, fighter pilot.
- November 17 – Mohammad Shams Langeroodi, Iranian writer and academic.
- November 29 – Hamid Mirzadeh, Iranian academic.
- December 5 – Abbas Babaei, Iranian fighter pilot and commander.

== Deaths ==
- July 13 – Mostafa Adl, Iranian diplomat, politician and writer.
- November 1 – Badíʻu'lláh Effendí, One of the sons of Bahá'u'lláh, the founder of the Bahá'í Faith..
- ? – Abdulkhalig Akhundov, Azerbaijani physician, writer and publisher.
