= Manuchehr (name) =

Manouchehr
- Gender: Male

Origin
- Origin: Persian
- Meaning: Heaven's Face

Manuchehr, Manuchar, Manuchihr, Manucher, Manuchekhr, or Manouchehr (Persian: منوچهر, Manūčehr, Middle Persian: Manōčihr, Avestan: Manuščiθra) is a masculine given name of Persian origin meaning "Heaven's face". It consists of two parts, Manu (Manou), which means "Heaven" in old Persian; and Chehr, which means "face". Notable people with the name include:

== Given name ==
=== Manouchehr ===
- Manouchehr Ahmadov (born 1992), Tajik footballer
- Manouchehr Arianpour (1929–2021), Iranian translator
- Manouchehr Atashi (1931–2005), Persian poet
- Manouchehr Azmoun (1930–1979), Iranian politician
- Manouchehr Bahmani (born 1951), Iranian boxer
- Manouchehr Boroumand (1934–2017), Iranian weightlifter
- Manouchehr Eghbal (1909–1977), Prime Minister of Iran
- Manouchehr Esmaeili (1939–2022), Iranian voice actor
- Manouchehr Farid (1938–2026), Iranian-Australian actor
- Manouchehr Fasihi (born 1940), Iranian diver
- Manouchehr Ganji (born 1931), Iranian politician
- Manouchehr Habibi (born 1971), Iranian politician
- Manouchehr Hakim (died 1981), Iranian physician and anatomist
- Manouchehr Hashemi (1918–2007), Iranian intelligence officer
- Manouchehr Khosrodad (1927–1979), Iranian military officer
- Manouchehr Mohammadi (born 1956), Iranian film producer
- Manouchehr Mottaki (born 1953), Iranian Government Minister
- Manouchehr Parchami (born 1952), Iranian water polo player
- Manouchehr Shafaei (born 1949), Iranian human rights activist
- Manouchehr Sotoudeh (1913–2016), Iranian geographer
- Manouchehr Taslimi (1923–1998), Iranian academic
- Manouchehr Vazifekhah (1940–1980), Iranian security officer
- Manouchehr Vossough (1944–2022), Iranian actor and film producer
- Manouchehr Yazdi (born 1939), Iranian teacher and politician
- Manouchehr Yektai (1921–2019), Iranian-American painter

=== Manuchar ===
- Manuchar (son of Levan III Dadiani) (1665–1680), Georgian prince
- Manuchar Sharvashidze, prince of the Principality of Abkhazia
- Manuchar I Dadiani (died 1611), Georgian prince
- Manuchar II Dadiani (died 1840), Georgian prince
- Manuchar I Jaqeli (1452–??), Georgian prince
- Manuchar II Jaqeli (1550–1614), Georgian noble
- Manuchar III Jaqeli (1591–1625), Georgian noble
- Manuchar Kvirkvelia (born 1978), Georgian Greco-Roman wrestler
- Manuchar Machaidze (born 1949), Georgian footballer
- Manuchar Markoishvili (born 1986), Georgian basketballer
- Manuchar Tskhadaia (born 1985), Georgian wrestler

=== Manuchehr ===
- Manuchehr, mythical hero from the Shahnameh
- Manuchehr Anvar (born 1928), Iranian writer
- Manuchehr Ashtiani (1930–2020), Iranian sociologist
- Manuchehr Eliasi (born 1946), Iranian politician
- Manuchehr Khan Gorji (died 1847), Qajar Iran statesman
- Manuchehr Jamali (1929–2012), Iranian philosopher
- Manuchehr Kholiqnazarov, Pamiri human rights activist
- Manuchehr Shahrokhi, Iranian-American academic

=== Manuchekhr ===
- Manuchekhr Dzhalilov (born 1990), Tajik footballer
- Manuchekhr Safarov (born 2001), Tajik footballer

=== Manucher ===
- Manucher Mirza Farman Farmaian (1917–2003), Qajar prince
- Manucher Ghorbanifar (born 1945), Iranian arms dealer

=== Manuchihr ===
- Manuchihr (died 1031), king of the Ziyarids
- Manuchihr I (died 1034), 11th shah of medieval Shirvan
- Manuchihr II (died 1106), 17th shah of medieval Shirvan
- Manuchihr III (died 1160), 19th shah of medieval Shirvan
- Manuchihr of Konus, Iranian monarch
- Manuchihr ibn Shavur, Shaddadid emir of Ani

== Surname ==
- Armen Manucharyan (born 1995), Armenian footballer
- Ashot Manucharyan (born 1954), Armenian teacher
- Edgar Manucharyan (born 1987), Armenian footballer
- Nina Manucharyan (1885–1972), Armenian film actress
