= 1951 in Iran =

- Decades: 1930s; 1940s; 1950s; 1960s; 1970s
- See also: Other events of 1951; Years in Iran

The following lists events that happened during 1951 in Pahlavi Iran.

== Incumbents ==
- Shah: Mohammad Reza Pahlavi
- Prime Minister: Haj Ali Razmara (until March 7), Hossein Ala' (March 12 – April 27), Mohammad Mosaddegh (starting April 28)

== Events ==
- Iran at the 1951 Asian Games.

== Births ==
- January 6 – Mina Nouri, Iranian painter and printmaker.
- January 8 – Ali Niakani, Iranian association football player.
- January 8 – Mohammad Azarhazin, Persian boxer.
- January 10 – Gholam Hossein Koohi, cyclist.
- January 29 – Fereydoon Foroughi, Iranian musician.
- January 31 – Sirus Alvand, Iranian film director and screenwriter.
- February 3 – Hassan Firouzabadi, Chief of Staff of the Iranian Armed Forces.
- February 4 – Dariush (singer), Iranian singer and former actor.
- February 4 – Sahameddin Mirfakhraei, Iranian footballer.
- February 12 – Behrouz Souresrafil, Iranian journalist.
- February 21 – Reza Ghoflsaz, Iranian association football player.
- March 4 – Kazem Seddiqi, Iranian scholar.
- March 4 – Leonardo Alishan, writer, scholar, translator.
- March 5 – Ahmad Tavakkoli, Iranian politician.
- March 11 – Iraj Danaeifard, Iranian association football player.
- March 16 – Mohammad Sadeghi (footballer, born 1952), Iranian footballer.
- March 21 – Mahshid Moshiri, Iranian writer.
- March 27 – Pouran Derakhshandeh, Iranian film director, producer, screen writer, and researcher.
- March 30 – Mohammad Ali Mohammadi, Iranian cyclist.
- April 1 – Mostafa Moeen, Iranian politician.
- April 9 – Massoud Farasati, Iranian film critic.
- April 13 – Mahmoud Kalari, Iranian cinematographer.
- April 21 – Yousef Azizi (Bani-Torof), Iranian journalist.
- May 2 – Jalil Zandi, Iranian general.
- May 4 – Masoud Mojdehi, footballer.
- May 5 – Aki Banayi, Iranian singer.
- May 13 – Kianoush Ayari, Iranian film director and film editor.
- May 19 – Asghar Aghamohammadi, Iranian immunologist.
- May 22 – Houshang Montazeralzohour, Iranian amateur wrestler.
- May 26 – Mohamad Kasebi, Iranian actor and film director.
- May 29 – Hossein Niknam, Iranian fencer.
- May 29 – Mahmoud Farshidi, Iranian politician.
- June 4 – Mansoor Hekmat, Iranian politician.
- June 8 – Marzieh Boroumand, Iranian TV director.
- June 15 – Hamid Dabashi, American academic.
- June 19 – Ghafour Jahani, Iranian footballer.
- June 19 – Reza Kianian, Iranian actor and artist.
- June 22 – Bahram Shirdel, Iranian architect.
- June 26 – Reza Fieze Norouzi, Iranian actor.
- July 7 – Alireza Afshar, Iranian military officer.

== Deaths ==
- January 24 – Gregory Yeghikian, Armenian playwright.
- February 3 – Vosugh od-Dowleh, Prime Minister of Iran.
- March 7 – Ali Razmara, Iranian politician.
- April 4 – Sadegh Hedayat, Iranian writer.
- April 21 – Mohammad-Taqi Bahar, Iranian Poet, writer, historian, scholar and politician.
- May 9 – Gholamreza Rashid-Yasemi, Iranian academic and author.
- November 16 – Mohammad Tadayyon, Iranian politician.
- ? – Karim Buzarjomehri, Iranian general.
- ? – Mastoureh Afshar, Iranian journalist.
