= Taheri =

Taheri may refer to:

- Siraf, formerly Taheri, a city in Iran
- Taheri, Hormozgan, a village in Iran
- Mohammad Ali Taheri (b. 1957), alternative medicines researcher
- Amir Taheri (b. 1942), Iranian author and activist
- Hossein Taheri (1941–2010), Iranian politician
- Jalal Al-Din Taheri, Iranian cleric
- Mohammad Taheri (b. 1985), Iranian futsal player
- Mohammed Taheri, Iranian diplomat
- Mohammad Sadegh Taheri, Iranian footballer

== See also ==
- Tahiri (disambiguation)
