= Eghbali =

Eghbali is an Iranian surname. Notable people with the surname include:

- Ali Eghbali Dogaheh (1949–1980), Iranian fighter pilot
- Behdad Eghbali (born 1976), Iranian–American businessman
- Darush Eghbali (born 1951), Iranian singer
