= Juma Mosque, Shamakhi =

Mosque in Shamakhi, Azerbaijan

Juma Mosque of Shamakhi
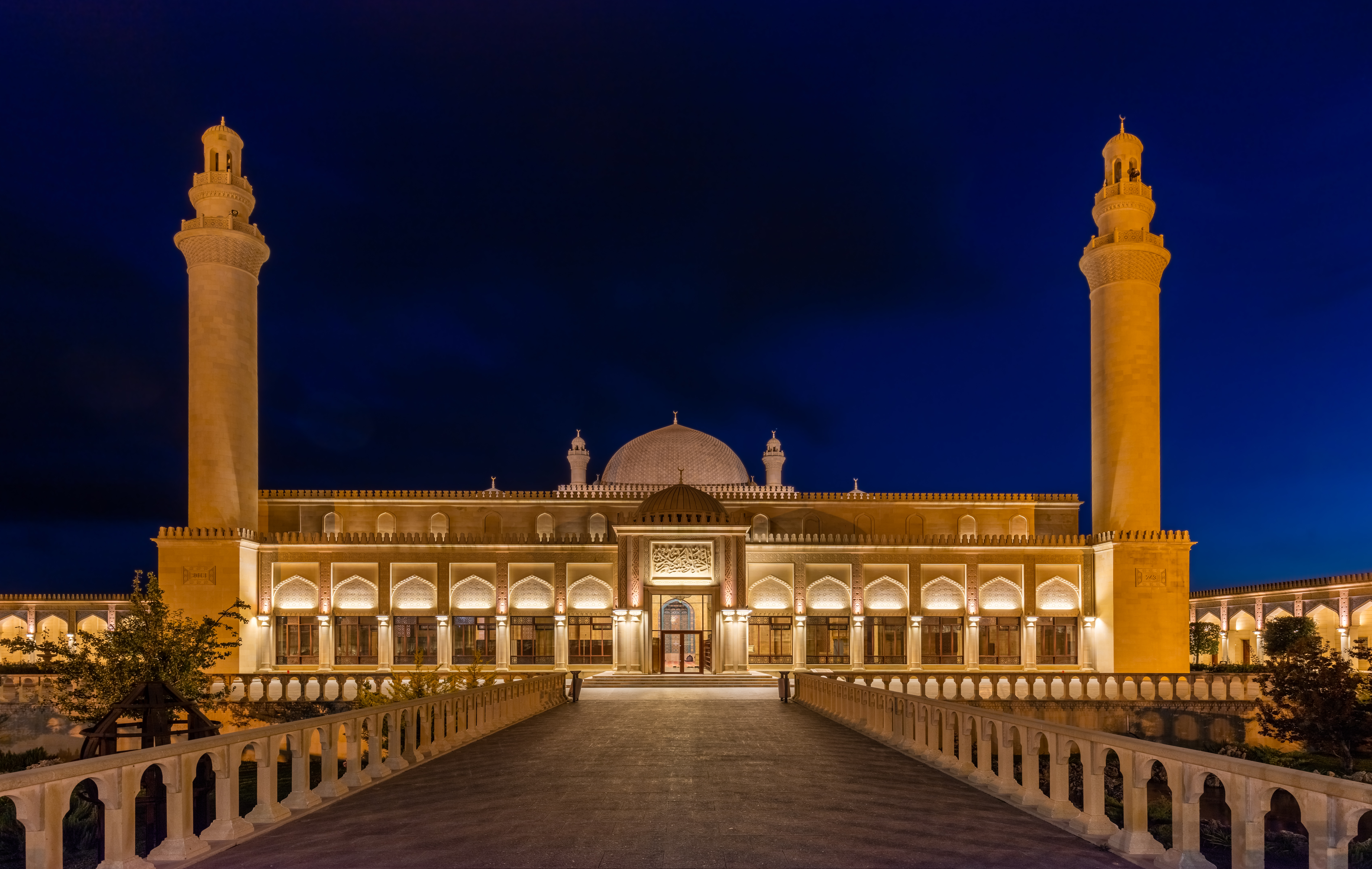
- The mosque in 2016

- Location of the mosque in Azerbaijan

Religion
- Affiliation: Islam
- Ecclesiastical or organisational status: Mosque
- Status: Active

Location
- Location: Shamakhi
- Country: Azerbaijan
- Coordinates: 40°37′36″N 48°38′38″E

Architecture
- Type: Mosque architecture
- Style: Umayyad
- Completed: c. 744

Specifications
- Dome: One (maybe more)
- Minaret: Four

The Juma Mosque of Shamakhi (Azerbaijani: Şamaxı Cümə Məscidi, Arabic: مسجد الجمعة في شماخي, Persian: مسجد جمعه شماخی), is a mosque in the city of Shamakhi, Azerbaijan.

== History ==
The mosque was built in 126 AH (743/744 CE), from ligature on the façade of the Juma Mosque, based on geological research from Tiflis, which was led by Prince Shahgulu Qajar. The construction of mosques began in the territory of Azerbaijan around this time. The historical appearance of ancient Islamic architectural monuments was related to Arabs’ governance and spreading of Islam in the territory of Azerbaijan. The Juma Mosque of Shamakhi is considered the first mosque in the Caucasus after cathedral Juma Mosque of Derbent, that was constructed in 734.

The construction date of the Juma Mosque is dated from the governance period of Caliphate’s vicar in the Caucasus and Dagestan, Arabic commander Maslam ibn Abd-al Melik, brother of Umayyad caliph Valil I (705-715), by whom Shamakhi was chosen as the residence. In these years Arab governors, strengthening towers of this ancient city with the rich cultural heritage, began the construction of new structures in its territory. Arabs attached the great importance to Shamakhi, which is visible from the great architectural appearance of Juma Mosque.

=== Reconstructions ===
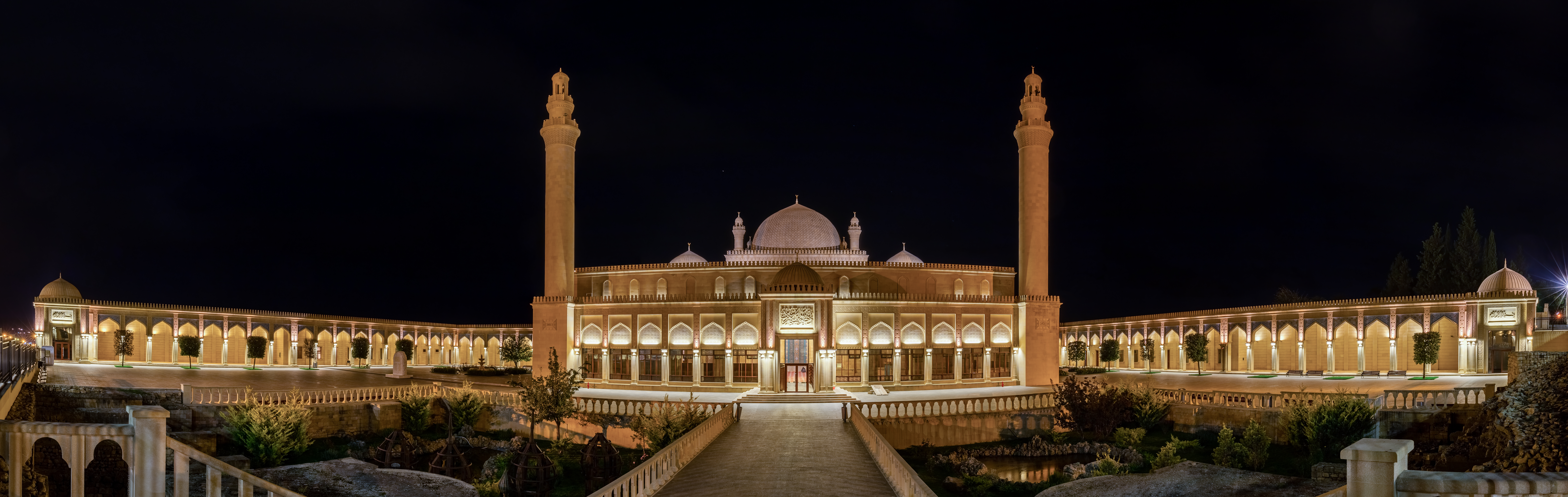
Panoramic night view

Considerable demolitions and damages of Juma Mosque during the battles and earthquakes were the reason of restorative reconstructions of the mosque’s building. According to information of Imadeddin Isfahani - a chronicler of Seljuq’s epoch, beginning from 1123, Shirvanshah rulers resorted to Seljuq’s sultan Mahmud (1118-1131), for defense from forays of Georgians. The chronicle says that “the assailants demolished the mosque, knocked down the minaret, plundered in the city” at that time in Shamakhi.

The first construction of Juma Mosque was begun at the end of the 12th century and was related to the considerable damage to Juma Mosque's building suffered from partial forays and was conditioned by the strengthening of Shirvanshakh's power during the reign of the ruler Manuchehr III, by whom were built new constructions and strengthened the city walls. Historian-archeologist Jiddi, relying on historical sources and books about construction reported about a sobriquet “The Great Khagan”, how Manuchehr II was called due his great merits. At that time, the eminent Persian poet Khaqani, native of Shamakhi, wrote that “the glory of his city overshadowed the glory of Bukhara”. Archeological excavations, held in 1970, in the territory of the mosque confirmed the considerable constructional and architectural changes, dated from that epoch. Considerable amount of madrasah, cell-huts and graves were found during the archeological excavations.

The second construction of the mosque was made in the 17th century, during the reign of the Safavid dynasty. Evliya Çelebi-Turkish scientist-traveler visiting Shamakhi in 1656, said that Juma Mosque is the largest religious construction of the city among others. In his work, Evliya Chelebi reports about some structural changes of Juma Mosque during the Safavids’ epoch.

The third reconstruction of the mosque was made in 1860 by province architect Hajibababeyov after the great damage to the building by the earthquake in 1859. This reconstruction was made on the basis of draft images of Russian artist Grigory Gagarin.

The fourth reconstruction was begun after the strongest earthquake in 1902, which was demolished and damaged many buildings of Shamakhi. For complete reconstruction of the mosque were gathered donations by philanthropists and was created a special committee. Primarily, the reconstruction of the mosque was charged to the eminent Azerbaijani architect of that time-Ziverbey Ahmadbeyov, a native of Shamakhi city. One of the conditions of the architect was preservation of the external of the mosque, but the committee didn’t agree with that, which became the reason of the architect’s discharge from the subsequent works of the mosque’s reconstruction. Continuation of the work in the mosque was offered to the architect Józef Plośko. Variation of the project, presented by Józef Plośko in 1909, provided considerable change of facade and external look of the mosque. The project was based on the foundation of elder plan and results of the uncompleted construction, but there appeared orderly flanking minarets on it and open balconies with light pavilions, symmetric-axial composition of the mosques with pair minarets was completed by a great central cupola. Such planning was used in the 15th century in construction of Tabriz school of architecture for the first time and also adopted architectural features of Shirvanshahs’ Palace ensemble in Baku. Construction of the mosque based on Józef Plośko's project was charged to D.Sadykhbeyov, but such important elements as the central cupola, side minarets, gallery, portal and central stair platform were deleted from the project during the work because of the deficiency of financial resources.

In December 2009, a governmental order about the restoration of the Juma mosque of Shamakhi was issued.

== Design and planning ==
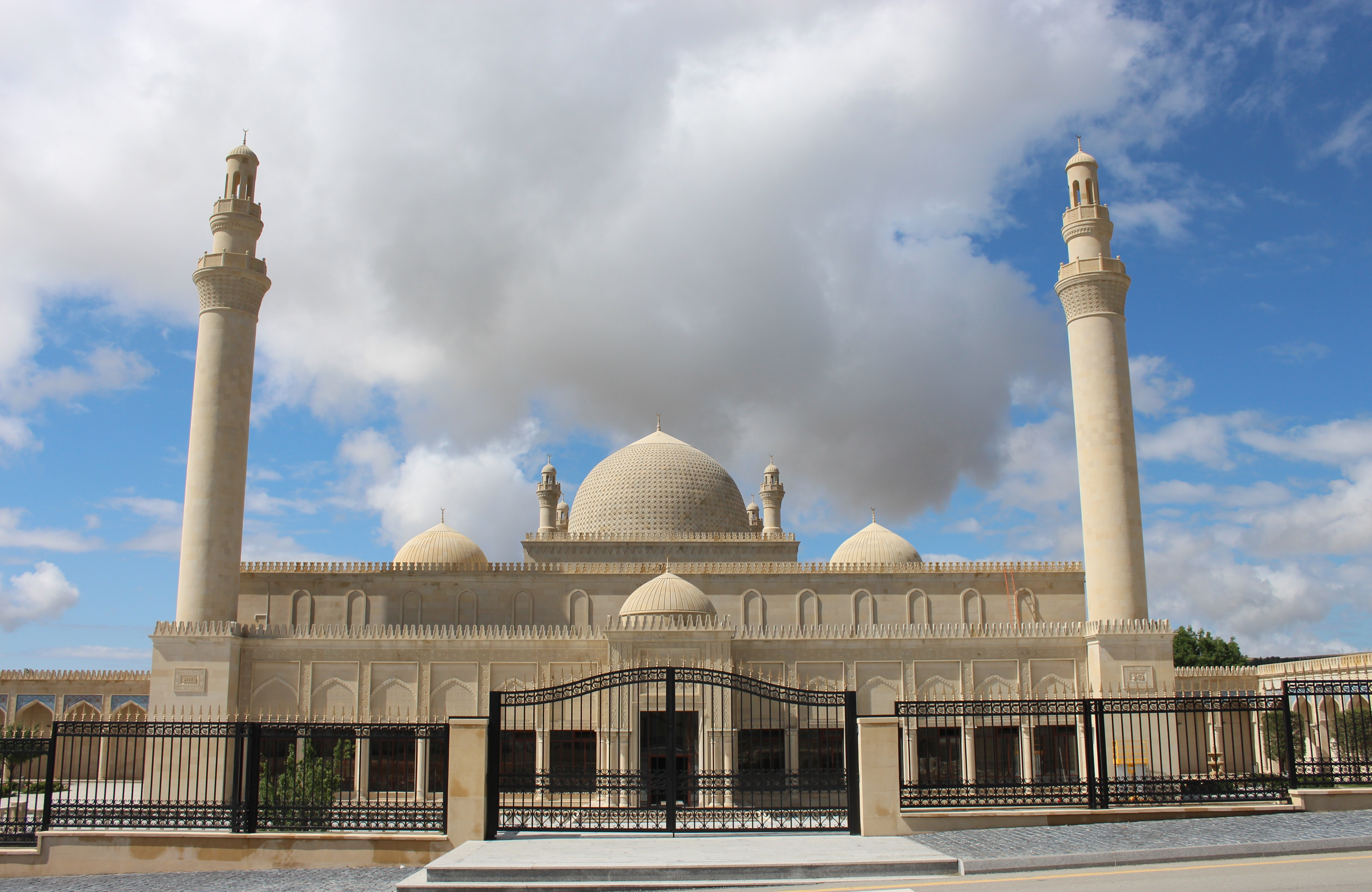
Frontal view of the main building of the mosque.

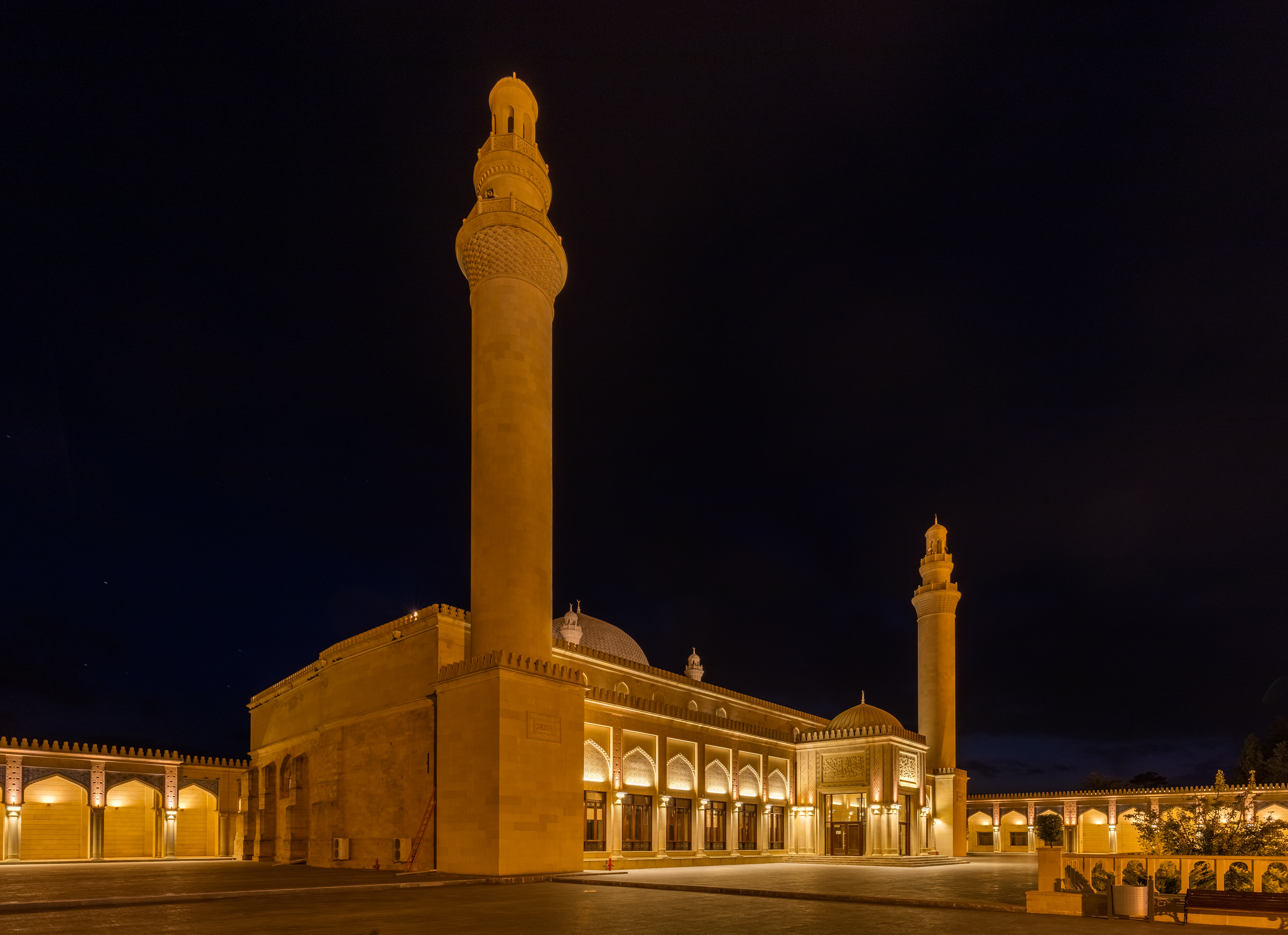
Lateral view.

The Juma Mosque Complex, always distinguished by its volume and silhouette among cultic and civil monuments of Azerbaijan because of the correlation with earlier monuments of Islamic architecture, keeping its composition centre. The only extant sketch of Juma Mosque was made in 1847, by Russian architect G. Gagarin from life, who portrayed architectural monuments and other cities of Azerbaijan in his pictures. Just these pictures make an idea of the external look and internal ornamentation of old Juma Mosque. The ancient internal planning organization of the mosque has been kept until now, despite the multiple reconstructions. The three-hall structure of the mosque, three-section internal area covered with central and not great side cupolas, are seen in G. Gagarin's pictures. The central pointed dome, pillars of side sections and oblong interior of the main hall of the worship makes Juma Mosque similar to Juma Mosque of Derbent. Plan of the mosque is rectangular, sizes of the mosques are 46 meters length and 28 meters width, the mosque has a large worship hall, divided into three separated quadratic sections related with each other by open and large apertures. Each part of the mosque has separate mihrab and aperture for entrance. Juma Mosque is called a three-hall mosque because of such a plan. Such kind of planning reminds of the planning organization of the well-known Great mosque of the Umayyads in Damask, which was built in 708. Juma Mosque of the 8th century in Aghsu, which was destroyed during the fire in 1918, was differed with analogical planning. The frequent constructions enabled to keep initial internal outlines and foundation of the mosque in whole, though the internal ornamentation and some details of the external facade suffered definite modifications. Archeological research showed that, the plan of the building remained invariable, in spite of the multiple reconstructions.

Most considerable modifications to the architectural structure of the mosque were made on Józef Plośko's project. The architect added elements of the Eastern architecture, taking traditions of Islamic architecture as a principle of that time, to his project. The planning structure of Juma Mosque should be supplemented with dynamic content and special picturesqueness in Józef Plośko's interpretation. Eliminating side abutments of the worship hall, the architect tried to create the most solid and monumental interior. For creating the same size of three halls of the mosque, the architect with specific artistic-plastic expressiveness conceived a non-traditional construction, the metallic carcasses of which were produced in Warsaw for Shirvan zone of the cupola. For strengthening the significance of the composition, Plośko developed a high multiple-window lodgement to which the central cupola leaned on. There should be four decorative minarets around it. Ornamental decorations, shebeke (window frameworks with gashed patterns) and decorative pillars were also intended to be in the project.

== See also ==
- Islam in Azerbaijan
- List of mosques in Azerbaijan
