= Firouzeh Mizani =

Firouzeh Mizani (Persian: فیروزه میزانی) (born December 12, 1950, in Tehran, Iran) is a contemporary Persian poet, writer, and journalist.

Mizani's poems first appeared in Tamasha Magazine and a literary monthly, Roudaki, in 1975. As a result of Manouchehr Atashi's literary analysis of her work, she has often been linked to the movement of "Pure Poetry" of South of Iran. "Pure Poetry" is a unique genre in the progression of Iran's modern "New Poetry" (شعر نو).

Firouzeh Mizani has published five books of poems. "Poetry of the Moment" (شعر به دقیقه اکنون) is the title of three consecutive volumes of poetry from over forty modern Iranian poets. She, along with Ahmad Mohit, accumulated poems from well known as well as emerging poets from different parts of Iran.

== Books ==
- (طراوت آواره) Wandering Freshness (1979)
- (شعر به دقیقه اکنون جلد اول) Poetry of the Moment, Volume 1 (1988)
- (شعر به دقیقه اکنون جلد دوم) Poetry of the Moment, Volume 2 (1990)
- (شعر به دقیقه اکنون جلد سوم) Poetry of the Moment, Volume 3 (1996)
- (حسودی به سنگ) Envious of the Stone (1994)
