= Manucharyan =

Manucharyan (Armenian: Մանուչարյան) is an Armenian patronymic surname made up of Manuchar and the Armenian -yan or -ian.

It may refer to:

- Armen Manucharyan (born 1995), Armenian footballer
- Ashot Manucharyan (born 1954), Armenian teacher
- Edgar Manucharyan (born 1987), Armenian footballer
- Nune Manucharyan (born 1962), Armenian singer-songwriter, pianist
- Nina Manucharyan (1885–1972), Armenian film actress

== See also ==
- Manuchehr (name) and variants Manuchar, Manuchihr, or Manouchehr (Persian: منوچهر, Manūčehr, Old Persian: Manōčihr)
