= Tahiri =

Tahiri may refer to:

- Bandar Siraf, also known as Tahiri, a city in Iran

Tahiri is a tribe living in Afghanistan and Iran

- Abdullah Tahiri (1956–1999), Albanian soldier
- Albin Tahiri (born 1989), Kosovan skier
- Anas Tahiri (born 1995), Belgian/Moroccan footballer
- Dashamir Tahiri (born 1966), Albanian politician
- Dodë Tahiri (1915–1988), Albanian footballer
- Edita Tahiri (born 1956), Kosovan politician
- Ermal Tahiri (born 1969), Albanian footballer
- Mehdi Tahiri (born 1977), Moroccan tennis player
- Saimir Tahiri (born 1979), Albanian politician
- Xhafer Tahiri (born 1983), Kosovan politician
- Tahiri Elikana (born 1988), Cook Islands footballer
- Tahiri Veila, a Star Wars Legends character
- Muhammad Hisham at-Tahiri (born 1969), Afghan-Kuwaiti Islamic Scholar

== See also ==
- Taheri (disambiguation)
- Táhirih
