= Moniro Ravanipour =

Iranian writer

- Born: July 24, 1952 (age 73); Bushehr, Iran
- Occupations: Novelist, short story writer
- Spouse: Babak Takhti
- Children: 1
- Relatives: Gholamreza Takhti (father-in-law)
- Website: https://www.moniravanipor.com/

Moniro Ravanipour (Persian: منیرو روانی‌پور; born July 24, 1952) is an Iranian-American and internationally acclaimed innovative writer who is the author of ten titles published in Iran, and many more in United States, including two collections of short fiction, Kanizu and Satan's Stones, and the novels The Drowned, Heart of Steel, and Gypsy by Fire. Her tales, described as "reminiscent in their fantastic blend of realism, myth, and superstition of writers like Rulfo, Garcia Marquez, even Tutuola," frequently take as their setting the small, remote village in southern Iran where she was born. Nahid Mozaffari, editor of Strange Times, My Dear: The International PEN Anthology of Contemporary Iranian Literature, wrote that Ravanipour "has been successful in the treatment of the complex subjects of tradition and modernity, juxtaposing elements of both, and exposing them in all their contradictions without idealizing either." Ravanipour was among seventeen activists to face trial in Iran for their participation in the 2000 Berlin Conference, accused of taking part in anti-Iran propaganda. Copies of her current work were recently stripped from bookstore shelves in Iran in a countrywide police action. She is a former Brown University International Writers Project Fellow.

== Early life ==
Moniro Ravanipour was born in Jofreh Mahini, near Bushehr, South of Iran. She lived in Jofreh till she was 10, and then moved to Boushehr. Then went to Shiraz for Pahlavi Private High School. She joined Shiraz Pahlavi University in 1972 and studied Chemistry, and then changed major and took a degree in Psychology.

== Acting and theater experience ==
Moniro joined a theater group in Bushehr called The Theater and Literary Society of Bushehr. In 1967 Moniro acted in Mother, a play by Manouchehr Atashi. She then continued to act and participated in the production of several plays in Shiraz. Moniro worked with a group of college students for a play called Abazar Ghafari which was banned later. In 1975 she joined Shiraz Theatre Group for producing a play named Moalem, by Shapour Jowrkesh, and in 1976 participated in Tous Theatre Festival, and worked with Shapour Jowrkesh again, for a play named Khoubchehr.

== Post revolution ==
She faced educational restrictions during the Cultural Revolution in Iran, which occurred in the early post-revolution years. Amidst this turmoil, her brother was executed, while her sisters were barred from elementary and high school education. Additionally, one of her sisters and her husband were sentenced to death and fled Iran, while another brother-in-law faced multiple arrests. For a decade, she endured the instability of constantly changing residences due to the tumultuous situation. Despite the challenges, she managed to write her first short story collection in 1977 titled The Sparrow and Mr. President. However, the book was promptly banned from publication and removed from shelves.

After their home was attacked and looted in Bushehr, her family relocated to Shiraz. Moniro then moved to Tehran where, under a pseudonym, she found employment as a worker at Daroupakhsh Factory. Upon her true identity being uncovered, she worked for an additional six months at Amidi Factory, still under an assumed name. Later, she took on the graveyard shift as a nurse at a private hospital, once again using a false identity. In 1983, while visiting her parents in Shiraz, she was apprehended on the street during a regime-led random citizen arrest operation. It was during the harrowing days of imprisonment that she decided to become a widely recognized and successful writer upon regaining her freedom, determined not to suffer the fate of being silenced and forgotten like so many others.

== Writing career ==
Moniro resumed writing in 1965, focusing on children's books and screenplays. A year after the Iran–Iraq War, she traveled to the outskirts of Khanaqin to write a novel about war, from the point of view of a martyr's mother.

In 1988, Moniro began publishing her works under her real name. By 1994, she received her first invitation to the Women's Studies Organization of Vienna. Subsequently, she was invited to the United States where she delivered speeches across 21 states. Additionally, she received invitations from prestigious institutions and events such as the Goethe-Institut, the Literary Center of Gümüşlük in Bodrum, the Gothenburg Expo in Sweden, and the Heinrich Böll Foundation in Germany, and France.

Ravanipour received a fellowship from Brown University. Six months later she received another two year fellowship from Black Mountain Institute's City of Asylum as a visiting author, at University of Nevada, Las Vegas.

Ravanipour has been living in USA since then, writing and publishing her works. Since 2015 Ravanipour self-published her new and translated work on Amazon and Google Play She continues to hold workshops covering writing memoirs, short stories, and reading published works by other Iranian authors.

During her stay in the U.S. she has gone to Sacramento, Pittsburgh, San Francisco, Providence, for lectures and speeches. Her short stories have been translated into Arabic, Chinese, English, French, German, Kurdish, Polish (by Ivonna Nowicka), Swedish, Turkish.

== Style ==
She is famous for using magic realism, but the truth is that she uses the bitter reality she found in the happenings and real life in her homeland. Despite the bold use of surrealism and magical realism, she uses realism too. The settings of her stories are not just the rural world, but her work pictures life and culture in the urban life as well.

== Works ==
=== Books ===
- 1990 – The Drowned (translated to English)
- 1990 – Heart of Steel
- 1999 – Gypsy by the Fire
- 2017 – These Crazy Nights (translated to English)
- 2021 - I Will Call You Once i Arrive in Kyiv (translated to English)

=== Short story collections ===
- 1977 – The Sparrow and Mr. President
- 1988 – Kanizu
- 1990 – Satan's Stones
- 1994 – Siria, Siria
- 2001 – Frankfurt Airport's Woman
- 2002 – Nazli
- 2015 – Busker
- 2016 – The Lovers of the Old Testament
- 2016 – The Shipwrecked
- 2017 – Memoirs of the Mercuric Woman (memories and notes)
- 2021 – The Lonely Indian

=== Children's works ===
- Snow White, The Most Beautiful Star of the World, a new version of Kadoo Ghelgheleh Zan: Nashr-e Markaz
- Four books and audio tapes: Sahar Co.-

Fables for Children/Games for Children/A Collection of Children's Songs /three books and audio tapes: Iran Cassette Co.

- Three books: Institute for the Intellectual Development of Children and Young Adults
- Twelve books (an adaptation of Saadi's Golestan): Amoo Zanjirbaf

=== Other works ===
- 1990 – The Fairy Tales and Beliefs of Southern Iran's Region

=== Play ===
- 1976 – Rostam az Shahnameh Raft (Rostam Left the Epic of the Kings)

=== Screenplays ===
- 1987 – The Night Shift Nurse, based on her screenplay named "Water"
- 1994 – The Good Days of Life

== See also ==
- List of Iranian women
