= Bijan Davvaz =

Iranian mathematician

‌Bijan Davvaz
- بیژن دواز
- Education: Tarbiat Modarres University (PhD)
- Scientific career
- Fields: mathematics
- Institutions: Yazd University
- Thesis: Topics in Algebraic Hyperstructures (1997)
- Doctoral advisor: Mohammad Reza Darafsheh

Bijan Davvaz is an Iranian mathematician and Distinguished Professor of Mathematics at Yazd University. He is known for his works on algebraic hyperstructure theory, group theory, ring theory and module theory.

== Books ==
- Krasner Hyperring Theory
- Groups and Symmetry: Theory and Applications
- A First Course in Group Theory
- Examples and Problems in Advanced Calculus: Real-Valued Functions
- Hypergroup Theory
- Walk Through Weak Hyperstructures, A: Hv-structures
- Semihypergroup Theory
- Polygroup Theory And Related Systems
- Fuzzy Algebraic Hyperstructures: An Introduction
