= Asghar Aghamohammadi =

Iranian scientist

Asghar Aghamohammadi اصغر آقامحمدی
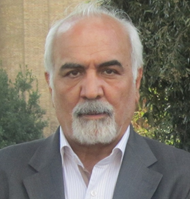
- Born: 19 May 1951; Ahvaz, Iran
- Died: 14 November 2020 (aged 69); Tehran, Iran
- Education: Ahvaz Jundishapur University of Medical Sciences, Tehran University of Medical Sciences and Great Ormond Street Hospital (M.D.), University of Toyama (Ph.D.)
- Known for: Primary immunodeficiency research and management
- Scientific career
- Fields: Immunology
- Workplaces: Research Center for Immunodeficiencies, Tehran University of Medical Sciences

Asghar Aghamohammadi (Persian: اصغر آقامحمدی) (born 1951, Ahvaz, Khuzestan province, Iran–2020, Tehran, Iran) was an Iranian (Persian) medical scientist, immunologist and Immunology professor at the Tehran University of Medical Sciences. Aghamohammadi had studied in many institutes, including the Ahvaz Jundishapur University of Medical Sciences, Tehran University of Medical Sciences, Great Ormond Street Hospital (Institute of Child Health) and the University of Toyama. He had been one of the most distinguished Iranian immunologists and awarded many national scientific prizes for his works, mostly in the field of primary immunodeficiency. Aghamohammadi is recognized internationally by hundreds of publications in this field and was the most important contributor to awareness of primary immunodeficiencies and to the management of immunodeficient patients in Iran. He had even been regarded as one of the most notable Iranian people in some lists.

== Early life ==
Aghamohammadi was born on 31 May 1951 in Ahvaz. In childhood he studied in Shahandeh and Bahar elementary schools and then in Doctor Hesabi Highschool. His father was Ahmad Aghamohammadi, who constantly encouraged his children to seek academic education. In his first high school years, Asghar was interested in studying law, until he was taught basic life support by a physician who was a friend of his father. This resulted in his shift of enthusiasm to medicine, and his later studies in this field.

== Higher education ==
At 1970, Aghamohammadi entered the Ahvaz Jundishapur University of Medical Sciences for a 7-year Medicine course by way of Iranian University entrance exam. after completing this course, he took an interest in children's diseases, particularly those with a genetic basis. He traveled to Tehran and specialized in Pediatrics in Children's Medical Center, Tehran university of medical sciences and subspecialized in Pediatric Clinical Immunology in the same Hospital, which finished in 1991. To further study Pediatric Clinical immunology, he moved to London and enrolled in a 3-year Pediatric Clinical Immunology fellow ship in the Department of Pediatric Clinical Immunology, Great Ormond Street Hospital, Institute of Child Health, London, UK. Aghamohammadi then returned to Iran and began his career as a physician and researcher until he decided to enroll in a medical sciences' Ph.D. course in the Department of Pediatrics, Faculty of Medicine, University of Toyama, Toyama, Japan.

== Career ==
Since the beginning of his career, Aghamohammadi has held several key administrative positions both nationally and in the Tehran University of Medical Sciences. At 1994 after returning from the UK, he became an assistant professor of Pediatrics in the Tehran University of Medical Sciences in the field of Clinical Immunology. He then quickly rose to the rank of associate professor and Professor of Pediatrics in 2001 and 2007, respectively, including:

- The Vice Chancellor in treatment of Red Crescent Society of the Islamic Republic of Iran from 1981 to 1984
- President of the Amir Kabir Hospital, Tehran university of medical sciences, from 1991 to 1992
- Secretary General of Iranian council of degree evaluation of foreign students, from 1997 to 1999
- The Vice Chancellor in Research Affairs of Department of Pediatrics of Tehran university of medical sciences, since 1999
- Head of Division of Clinical Allergy and Immunology, Children Medical Center Hospital of Tehran
- Head of research center for immunodeficiency (RCID), Tehran, Iran, since 2010
- Chairman of Iranian Primary immunodeficiency Association

He has held several continuing medical education programs about primary immunodeficiencies in several medical universities in the country and has participated in many different national and international congresses related to these diseases.

== Memberships ==
Aghamohammadi is a member of many national and international committees and societies related to Primary immunodeficiency diseases and is also part of the editorial board of many notable journals in the field of Immunology:

- Member of British Society for Immunology, since April 1993
- Member of Iranian Society For Immunology And Allergy, since 1996
- Member of the Immunology academic staff of Tehran university of medical sciences
- Member of Iranian Society For Asthma And Allergy, since 1997
- Member of Primary Immunodeficiency Association of England, since 1997
- Member of the international "J Project"
- Founding Member of Iranian Primary Immunodeficiency Association.
- Chairman of Iranian Primary Immunodeficiency Association, since 1997
- Member of expert locator of National primary immunodeficiency Resource center.
- Member of European Society for Primary Immunodeficiencies (ESID).
- Editorial Board of [acta.tums.ac.ir/ Acta Medica Iranica] Journal, since 1997 until 2002
- Editorial Board of Iranian Journal of Allergy Asthma And Immunology, since 1999
- Editorial Board of Iranian Journal of Immunology, since 2004
- Member of Research committee of Faculty of Medicine, since 1997
- Member of Research committee of Faculty of Medicine, since 1997
- Editorial Board of Iranian Journal of J Investig Allergol Clin Immunol, since 2012
- Scientific Committee of .5th Iranian Congress of Immunology and Allergy, (May 2000), Tehran, Iran
- Research Council of Immunology Asthma & Allergy Research Institute

== Publications ==
Aghamohammadi's research area includes primary immunodeficiency mainly primary antibody deficiency disorders (X-linked agammaglobulinemia, Common variable immunodeficiency, Selective immunoglobulin A deficiency and Hyper IgM syndrome), Molecular diagnosis of patients with antibody deficiency and Management and treatment of patients with antibody deficiencies. As of 2013, he has an author status in about 200 articles indexed in PubMed and/or ISI, more than 20 articles published in Iranian journals and more than 50 International Podium participation and Presentations. He also participated in writing of 6 books on the subject of Primary immunodeficiency diseases, of which 3 are in Persian, two are in English and were published by Springer international publications and one is in the process of drafting by Springer.

== Honors and recognition ==
Since he started his career as a researcher, Aghamohammadi has been given many awards by different national organizations in Iran, including three prestigious Avicenna awards and one razi award, which are given to the most distinguished researchers and scientists of the country.

- Awarded for the implementation of Iranian PID patients registration In 4th Avicenna festival
- Awarded for participitation in writing the book "Primary Immunodeficiency Diseases: Definition, Diagnosis and Management" in 10th Avicenna festival,1387
- chosen as the paramount clinical researcher in 11th Avicenna festival
- chosen as the paramount researcher of internal clinical sciences in 16th Razi festival
- chosen as the paramount researcher in ministry of science's 12th research festival
- chosen as a paramount researcher in the Academy of Medical Sciences festival
- Selection of as a salient master of Iran in second Allame Tabatabaee Festival

== See also ==
- Iranian science
- Primary immunodeficiency
