= University of Toyama =

Japanese national university

Coordinates: 36°41′57″N 137°11′17″E

- 富山大学
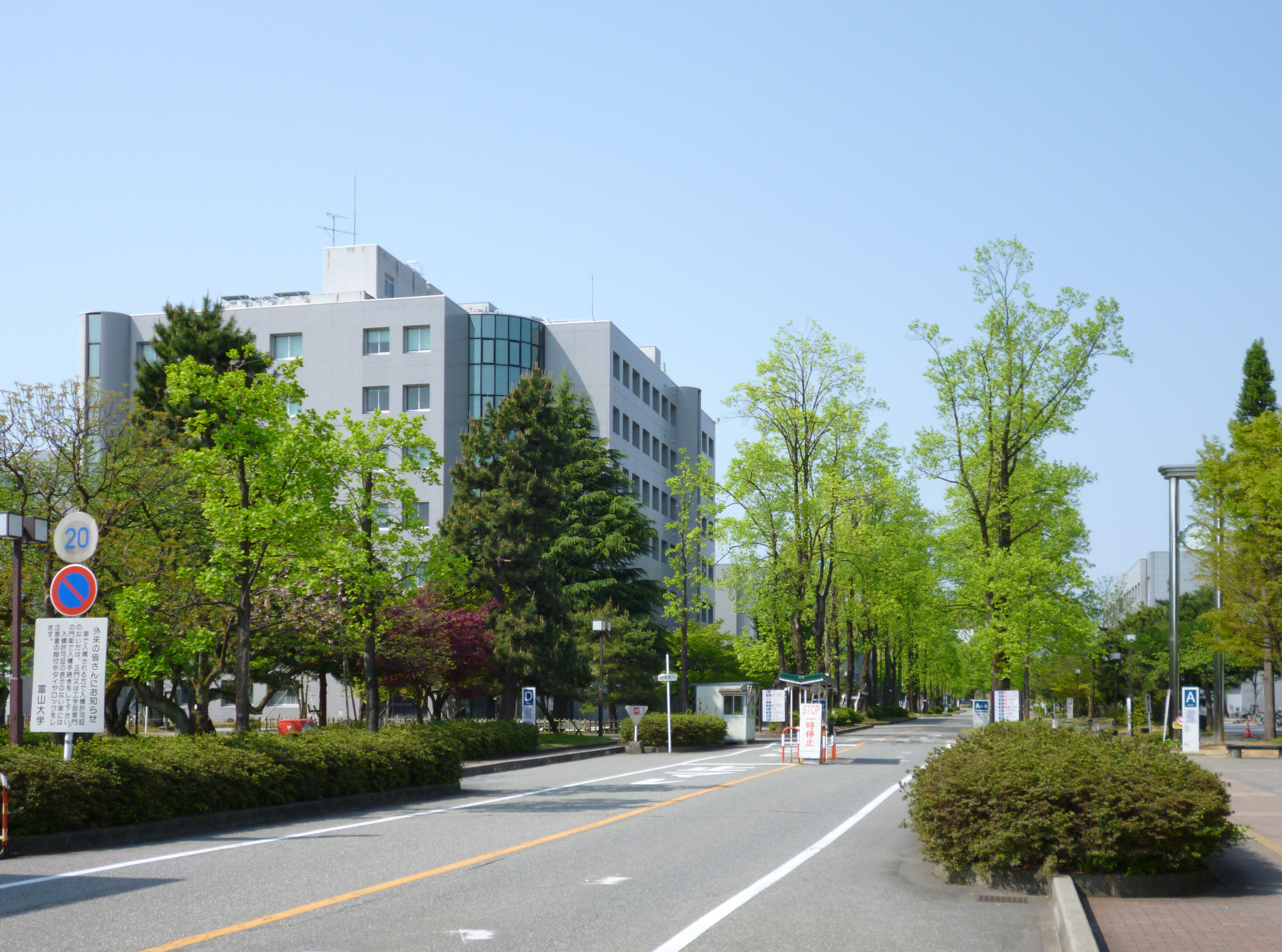
- Gofuku Campus
- Type: National
- Established: 1875 (1949)
- Academic staff: 839（May 2022）
- Administrative staff: 456（May 2022） (Note: excluding Attached hospital)
- Students: approx. 9,100
- Undergraduates: 7,930（May 2022）
- Postgraduates: 1,191（May 2022）
- Location: Toyama, Toyama Prefecture, Japan

The University of Toyama (富山大学, Toyama Daigaku) is a Japanese national university in Toyama Prefecture established in 1949. The University of Toyama has three campuses, namely the Gofuku, Sugitani, and Takaoka campuses.

The University of Toyama, Sugitani campus is the home to Institute of Natural Medicine, Experimental Station for Medicinal Plant Research, Faculty of Medicine, Life Science Research, Faculty of Pharmacy and Pharmaceutical Sciences, and Museum of Materia Medica and Pharmaceutical Science.

Numerous significant research on cell signaling as well as cancer research has transpired in the Division of Pathogenic Biochemistry under the Institute of Natural of Medicine, particularly, the works of Ikuo Saiki and Yoshihiro Hayakawa .

== Overview ==
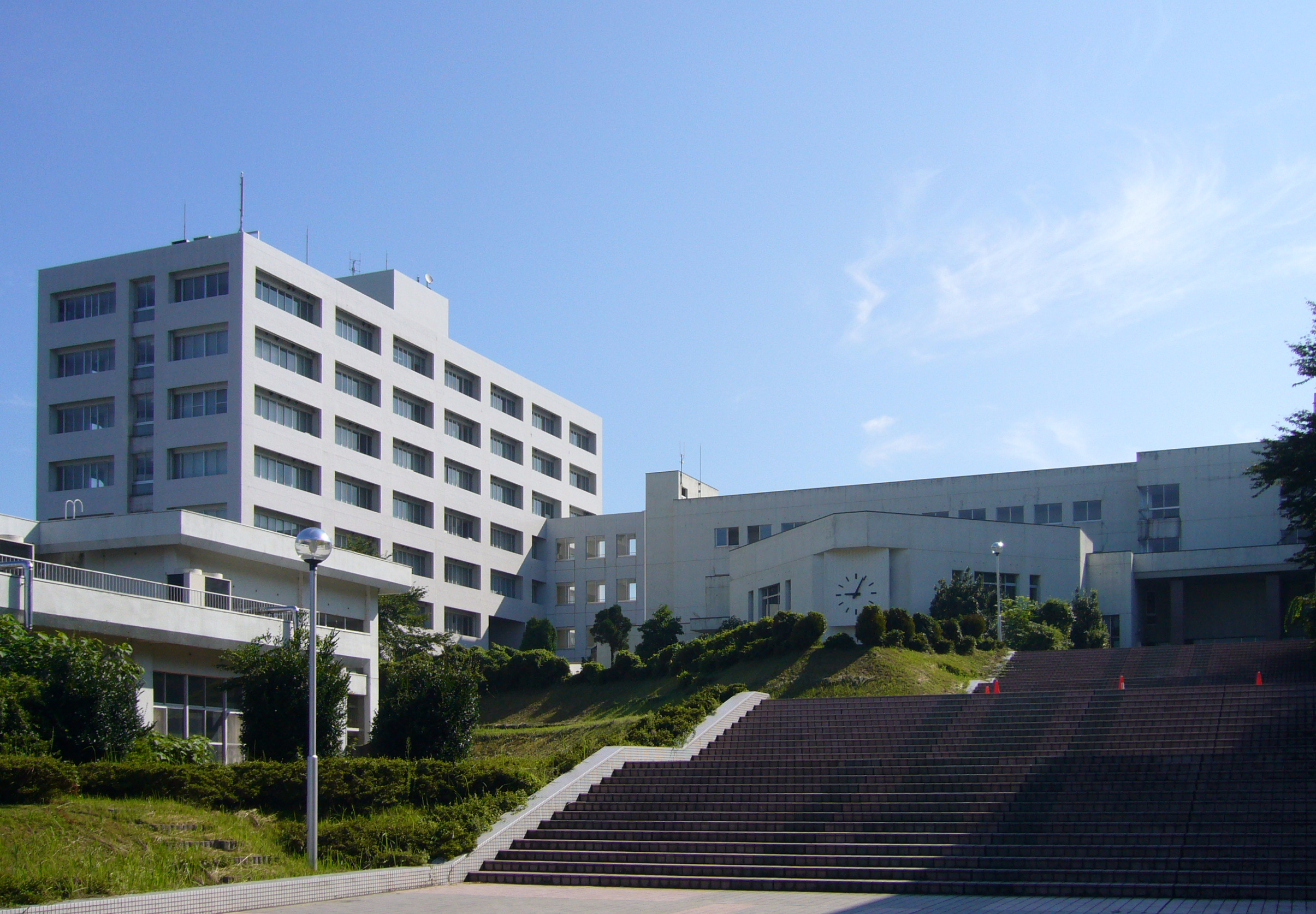
Sugitani Campus

The University of Toyama is located in the cities of Toyama and Takaoka in Toyama Prefecture, Japan. It was formed in October 2005 by combining Toyama University, Toyama Medical and Pharmaceutical University, and Takaoka National College. The origin of Toyama University is Nikawa Teachers College founded in 1875. The University of Toyama has three campuses: Gofuku, Sugitani and Takaoka. It consists of eight faculties, six graduate schools, laboratories, a hospital, libraries, and 18 institutes. It has about 9,300 students (including 300 international students).

== Faculties ==
- Faculty of Humanities
- Faculty of Human Development
- Faculty of Economics
- Faculty of Science
- Faculty of Engineering and natural science
- Faculty of Medicine
- Faculty of Pharmacy and Pharmaceutical Sciences
- Liberal Arts and Sciences (Sugitani Campus)
- Faculty of Art and Design

== Junior College of Business Administration ==
The Junior College of Business Administration, Toyama University (富山大学経営短期大学部, Toyama Daigaku Keiei Tanki Daigakubu) was a national junior college in the city of Toyama. The junior college opened in April 1959, affiliated with the University of Toyama. It offered evening courses in business management. The college closed in 1990.

== Takaoka National College ==
Takaoka National College
- 高岡短期大学
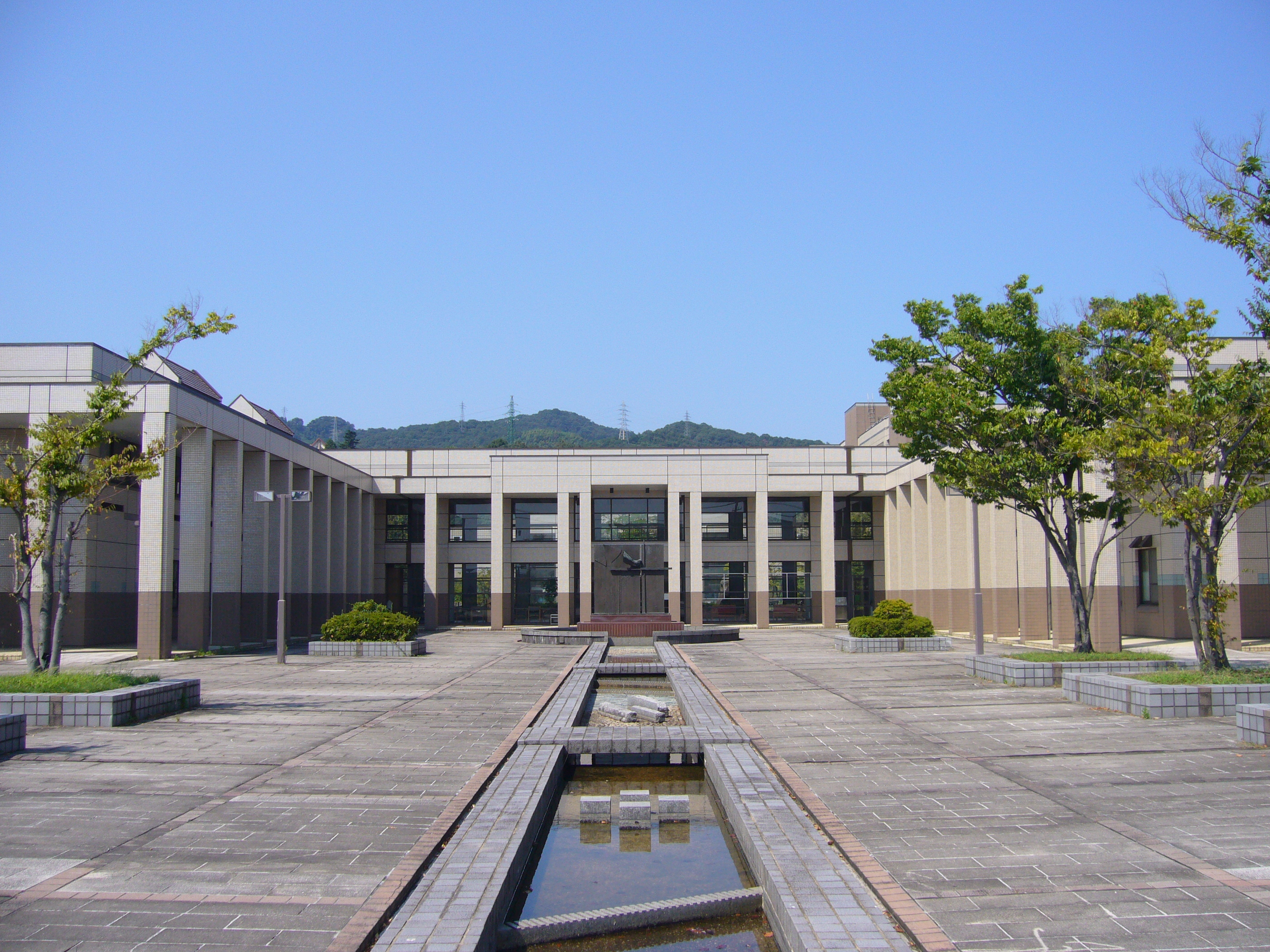
- The former Takaoka National College, now the Takaoka campus of Toyama University
- Type: Junior college
- Active: 1983–2010
- Location: Takaoka, Toyama, Japan
- Website: www.u-toyama.ac.jp/outline/history/takaoka-22.html

Takaoka National College (高岡短期大学, Takaoka Tanki Daigaku) was a national junior college located in the city of Takaoka, Toyama, Japan. Takaoka National College was established in April 1983, with registration of students starting in 1986. It was merged with Toyama Medical and Pharmaceutical University and Toyama University to form the University of Toyama in 2005, and closed in 2010.
