= Amir Hosein Fardi =

- Born: 27 September 1949 Ardabil, Iran
- Died: 25 April 2013 (aged 63) Tehran, Iran
- Occupation: Writer, Dastan and Fiction of Islamic Revolution

Amir Hosein Fardi (Persian: امیرحسین فردی, born 1949 in Ardabil – died 2013 Tehran) – was an Iranian Azerbaijani writer of Persian literature in occupation Dastan and Fiction of Islamic Revolution. He was a member of the fiction council at the Institute for Intellectual Development of Children and Young Adults (IIDCYA). Fardi was the editor-in-chief of the renowned children's monthly Kayhan Bacheha for 31 years. The events of the revolution expand his consciousness and he discovers a new ideology for the remainder of his life. The Nest in Fog and, A World of Butterflies and The Black Grass is among his credits. His funeral was present Gholam-Ali Haddad-Adel and Mohammad Hosseini minister of culture Ahmadinejad. also Ali Khamenei for his death wrote a letter.
