= Morteza Poursamadi =

Iranian cinematographer (1952–2023)

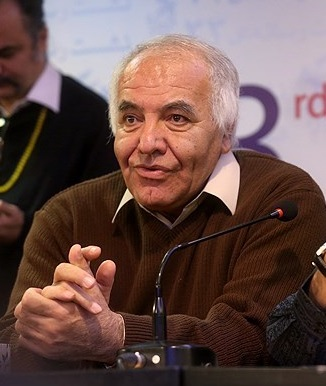

Morteza Poursamadi (Persian: مرتضی پورصمدی; 9 October 1952 – 2 September 2023) was an Iranian cinematographer.

== Biography ==
Poursamadi was born in Hamadan on 9 October 1952. He graduated from the cinematography department of the Higher School of Television and Cinema. He died on 2 September 2023, at the age of 70.
