= Hassan Makaremi =

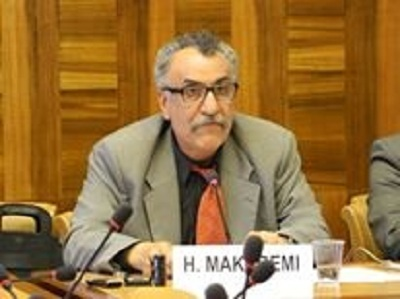

Hassan Makaremi (حسن مکارمی; born 1950 in Shiraz, Iran) is an Iranian artist, painter and calligrapher, Psychoanalyst and Human Rights Activists.

== Biography ==
Hassan Makaremi was born in Iran 23 August 1950. He lives in Paris.

Hassan Makaremi holds a diploma from the Polytechnic University of Tehran, Amirkabir University of Technology and École centrale Paris.

Twenty five exhibitions of his art-works have been organized in France, Russia, Netherlands, Morocco, Cuba and in the United States of America. He published five books in French, eight books in Persian and translated one book from French to Persian.

== Books ==
I- Books edited in Persian:

1- Note book of memories, Limoges, Shiraz, Edition, 1990

2- Geography of Vikl Bazar, Gardon Edition, Berlin, 2006

3- Hearing in other way, the past: Gardon Edition, Berlin, 2007

4- Piano with four hands, Gardon edition, Berlin 2008

5- The secret of Hafez, Edition, H&S Media, 2013, London

6-Strategic look to the green movement in Iran, Edition, H&S Media, 2013, London

7-Strategic loo to the future of Iran, Edition, H&S Media, 2014, London

8- CULTURAL LAND OF IRAN, Edition, H&S Media, 2015, London

II- Books edited in two languages Persian and French:

1- Piano with four hands, Harmattan Paris 2013

2- This Gardeh, you are the air, Harmattan, Paris, 2015

III- Translated books:

1- Television, Jacques Lacan, Rokhdad no Edition, Tehran, 2014

IIII- Books edited in French:

1- Another look to Hafez; Hafez par Hafez، Harmattan PARIS,

2- Look to the Calligraphy, UNESCO, Paris
