= Taheri, Hormozgan =

Village in Hormozgan, Iran

Taheri طاهری
- Village
- Location within Iran
- Coordinates: 27°17′29″N 56°40′51″E
- Country: Iran
- Province: Hormozgan
- County: Bandar Abbas
- Bakhsh: Qaleh Qazi
- Rural District: Qaleh Qazi

Population (2006)
  - Total: 262
- Time zone: UTC+3:30 (IRST)
  - Summer (DST): UTC+4:30 (IRDT)

Taheri (Persian: طاهری, also Romanized as Ţāherī) is a village in Qaleh Qazi Rural District, Qaleh Qazi District, Bandar Abbas County, Hormozgan Province, Iran. At the 2006 census, its population was 262, in 49 families.
