= Vahid Alaghband =

British trader

Vahid Alaghband (Persian: وحید علاقبند, born 20 March 1952) is a British-Iranian international commodities trader and entrepreneur based in London. He is founder and chairman of Mayfair-based Balli Group PLC. In 2008 the Sunday Times Rich List estimated his personal fortune at £130 million.

He was educated in Switzerland and the US, where he received his BS and MS degrees in Industrial Engineering and Operations Research at Cornell University, He is a member of the Clinton Global Initiative, a trustee of Asia House London and an International Council Member of Asia Society New York.

Vahid Alaghband was formerly Chair of The Iran Heritage Foundation, a non-political UK registered charity with the mission to promote and preserve the history, languages and cultures of Iran and the Persian world.
