= Sharif lotfi =

Sharif Lotfi
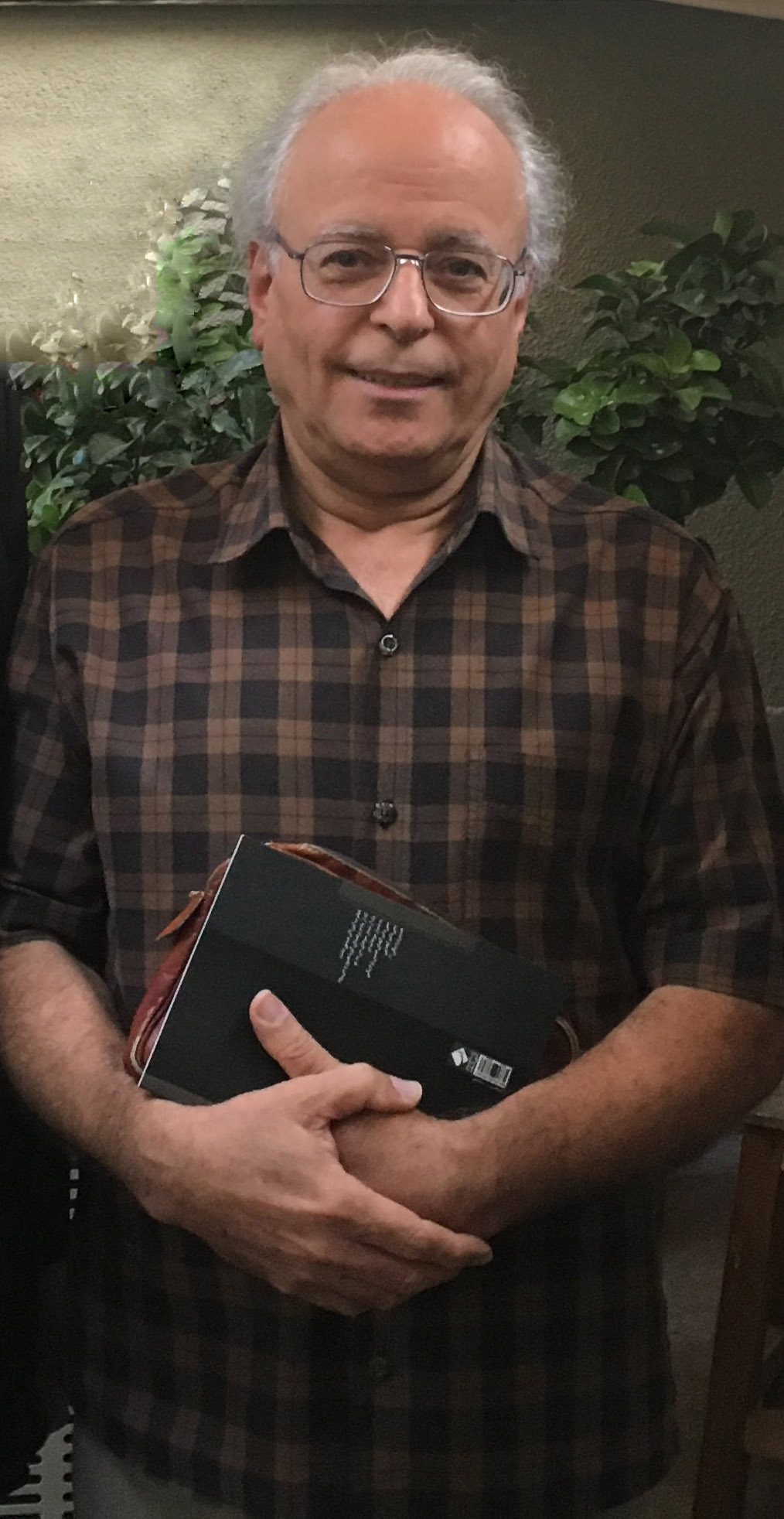

Background information
- Also known as: Sharif Lotfi
- Born: 16 May 1950 (age 76); Rasht, Iran
- Origin: Iran
- Occupations: Composer, conductor, musician
- Instrument: French horn

Sharif Lotfi (Persian: شریف لطفی, born 16 May 1950) is an Iranian musician, composer, conductor and music pedagogue. He is the founder of the Faculty of Music at Tehran University of Arts and has served as one of its professors and the dean until 2010.

== Biography ==
Sharif Lotfi was born on 16 May 1950 in the city of Rasht. He left for Tehran at the age of ten due to a change in his father's job. At the age of twelve, he entered the Tehran Conservatory of Music with the encouragement of his father, who was a student of Abolhassan Saba, and studied the horn as a specialized instrument under Morteza Hananeh.

After receiving a diploma in music, Sharif Lotfi worked simultaneously with the Tehran Symphony Orchestra, the Tehran Opera Orchestra and the Ballet Orchestra as a French horn player. After completing a bachelor's degree in music at the Tehran Conservatory of Music, he was awarded a government scholarship by the Minister of Culture and Arts as an honorary student. He continued his studies at the Academy of Music in Hamburg, Germany in the field of music pedagogy and orchestra conducting, and at the same time joined the Hamburg Symphony Orchestra and the Bremen Symphony Orchestra as a French horn player. He studied with professors such as Bruckner Rogerberg, Schrutter and Heinrich Keller.

Sharif Lotfi returned to Iran in 1977 after completing his postgraduate studies in the fields of music pedagogy and conducting an orchestra. He first became a member of the faculty of the Higher Conservatory of Music and later a member of the faculty of Tehran University of Arts. For a while, he was the director of the Tehran Conservatory of Music, and after that, he founded and led the Tehran University Symphony Orchestra.

After planning and compiling music studies, in 1991, he founded the Free Music Education Center of the University of Arts, and finally in 1994, he succeeded in establishing the first music school in Iran, entitled "Music School of Tehran University of Arts" on the Karaj campus of the University of Arts.

He was the conductor of the Bahman Cultural Center Symphony Orchestra, the re-registration and re-establishment of the Iranian Philharmonic Association, the establishment of the Gilan University Music Ensemble, and the conductor of the Tehran Philharmonic Orchestra after the 1957 Revolution. Sharif Lotfi, the founder, a member of the faculty and one of the professors of the Faculty of Music of Tehran University of Arts, was the dean of the Faculty of Music of the University of Arts until the end of 2010.

By the end of his presidency at the Faculty of Music, he succeeded in launching the following disciplines: composition, playing Iranian music, playing world music (classical) and military music at the undergraduate level, as well as disciplines: composing, playing Iranian music, playing world music (classical) and ethnomusicology. He received his master's degree.

The soundtrack of the film Madian is one of his works, which in 1985, won the Golden Tablet Award and the Diploma of Honor for the best soundtrack of the fourth Fajr Film Festival. The book The New Method of Basics of Music Performance by him was selected as the book of the year in 2003. His brother Ebrahim Lotfi is a famous violinist and teacher.

== Artwork ==
Among the works of Sharif Lotfi, the following can be mentioned:

=== Composing ===
- Segah for Piano and Orchestra
- Silk Road
- Etude for Horn
- Soroush for violin and orchestra
- Color Mahour
- National Student Olympiad Anthem
- Arranging music of Iranian regions for Iranian instrumental orchestra (local 1, 2, 3 and 4)
- A piece for singer, piano and choir
- Nava, for four Iranian instruments
- Local music album (with score)
- Dafineh Music Album, (2021)

=== Movie and TV series Music ===
- Madian (Ali Zhakan)
- Saman (Ahmad Nik Azar)
- Beside the ponds (Yadollah Novonsori)
- The girl by the swamp (Ali Zhakan)
- Iron Bird (Ali Shah Hatami)
- Travelers of Anar Valley (Yadollah Novonsori)
- Wild Deer (Hamid Khairuddin)
- Two companions (Asghar Hashemi)
- Mountain Silence (Yadollah Novonsori)
- Rana Series (Davood Mirbagheri)
- Jasmine perfume series (Bahman Zarrinpour)

=== Books ===
- Musical Thoughts – Dibayeh Publishing – 2013
- New method of music performance principles – University of Arts Publications – 2002

== Awards ==
- Special commendation plaque and statuette of the Science Promotion Award from the twelfth Iranian Science Promotion Award, 2011
- Winner of the 21st edition of the Book of the Year for writing the book The New Method of the Basics of Music Performance, 2003
- Placing a statue of Sharif Lotfi in the passage of Kish Island artists, 2000
- Selected Professor of Tehran University of Arts, 1995
- Receive the Golden Plate and the Diploma of Honor for the best soundtrack from the 4th Fajr Film Festival for the music of the film Madian, 1985
