= Nur-Ali Shushtari =

Iranian general

Sardar Shahid Nur-Ali Shushtari
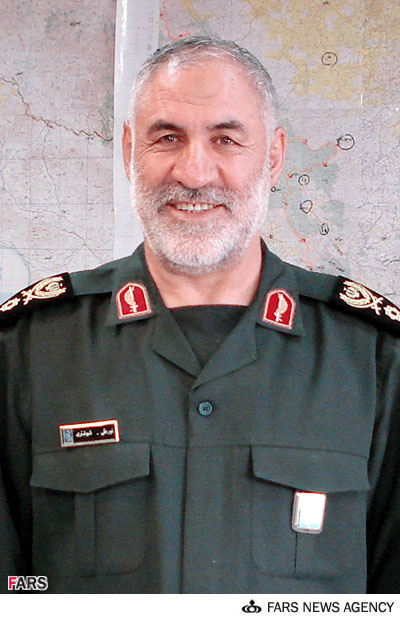
- Nur-Ali Shushtari in IRGC uniform
- Born: c. 1948; Nishapur, Iran
- Died: October 18, 2009 (aged 61); Pishin, Iran
- Military career
- Allegiance: Iran
- Branch: Revolutionary Guards
- Service years: 1979–2009
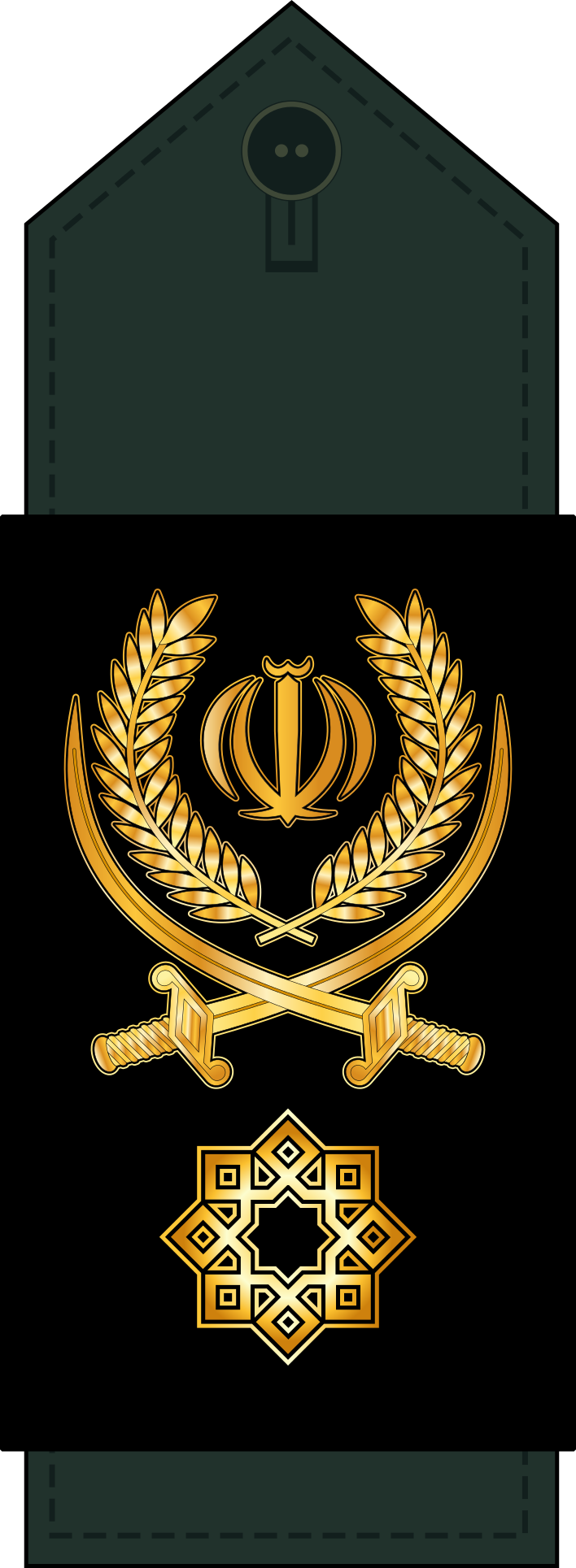
- Rank: Brigadier general
- Unit: Ground Forces
- Commands: Deputy commander of Ground Forces
- Conflicts: Iran–Iraq War; Operation Mersad; Sistan and Baluchestan insurgency; 2009 Pishin bombing

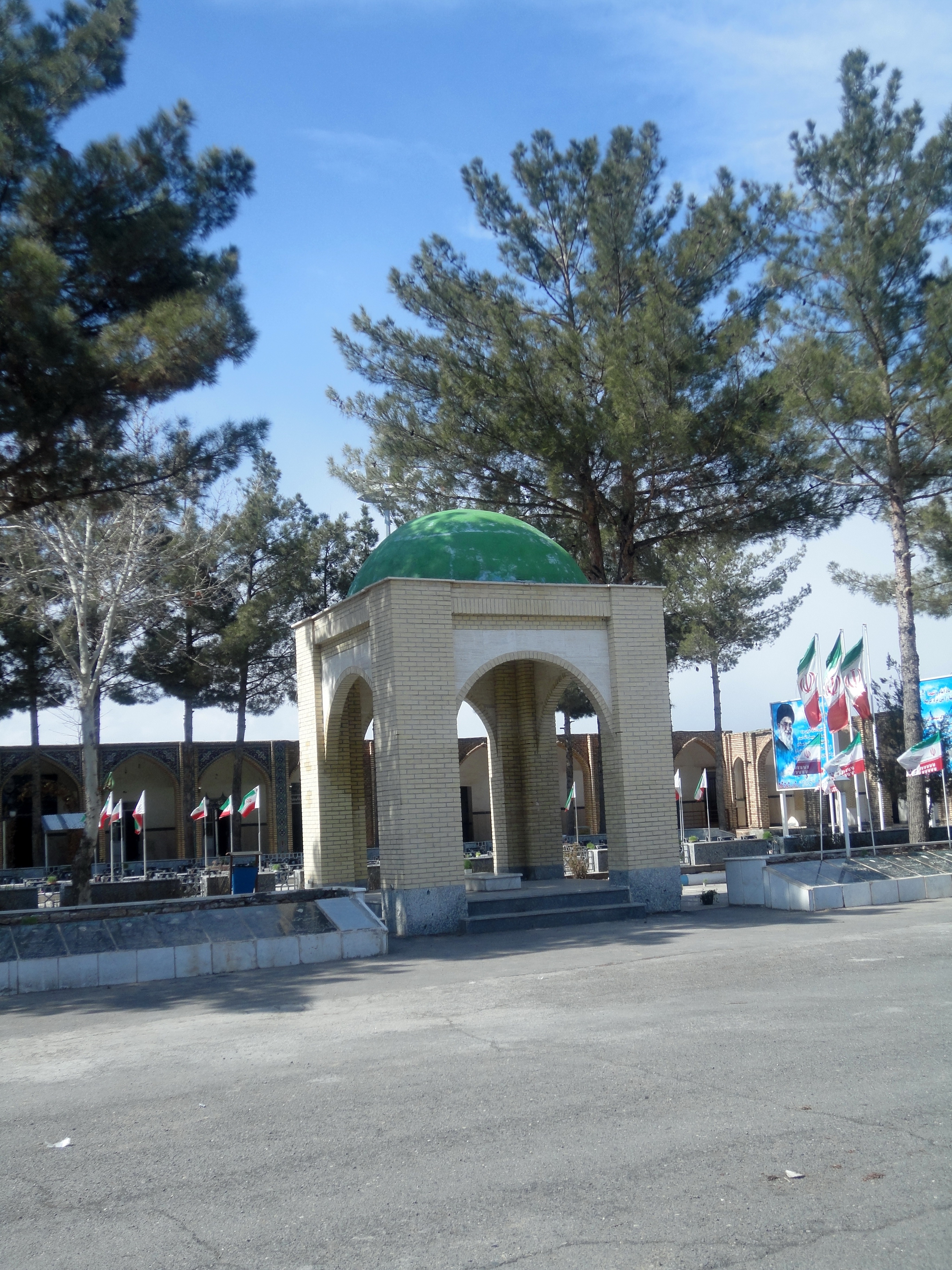
Tomb of Nur Ali Shushtari - Fazll Cemetery - Nishapur

Nur-Ali Shushtari (Persian: نورعلی شوشتری) was a brigadier general in the Iranian Islamic Revolutionary Guard Corps and deputy commander of its Ground Forces. He was assassinated in the 2009 Pishin bombing by the Jundullah Terrorist Group.
