= Manuchehr Ashtiani =

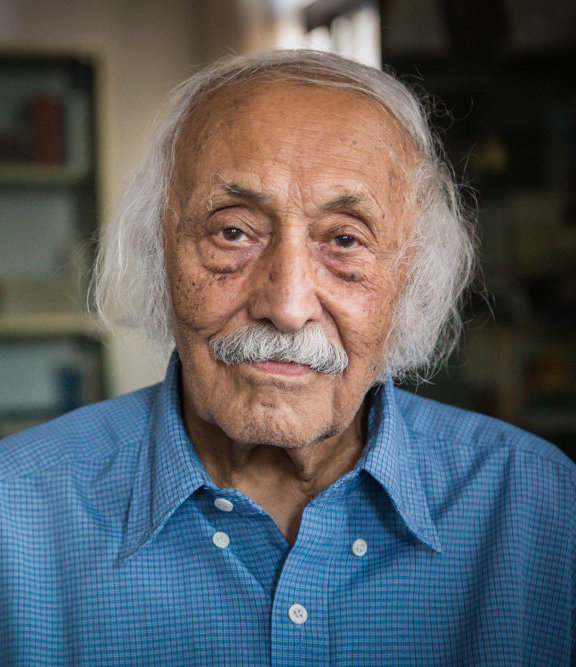
- Born: October 11, 1930; Tehran
- Died: September 29, 2020 (aged 89); Tehran
- Education: Heidelberg University
- Occupations: Professor and researcher of philosophy and social sciences
- Political party: Tudeh Party of Iran

Manuchehr Ashtiani (Persian: منوچهر آشتیانی; October 11, 1930– September 29, 2020) was an Iranian sociologist and neo-Marxist, a former member of the Tudeh Party of Iran, and a researcher in philosophy. He was the nephew of Nima Youshij and a descendant of Mirza Hasan Ashtiani. Ashtiani graduated from the doctoral program at Heidelberg University in 1971. After a prolonged illness, he died on September 29, 2020.

== Writing ==
The book "Questioning and Struggling" is a lengthy conversation between Reza Nsaji and Manouchehr Ashtiani about contemporary history and humanities in Iran. This book, dedicated to "three martyred students of the Technical College of Tehran University in the bloody protest of December 7, 1953 and three doctoral students of Tarbiat Modares University who preferred death on the path of homeland and ideology over school and diploma," is the first book of the "Oral History Project of the University in Iran."

Ashtiani, the nephew of Nima Youshij and the descendant of Ayatollah Mirza Hassan Ashtiani, recounts his political activities in the Tudeh Party of Iran, the split of Khalil Maleki, the Nationalization of the Iranian oil industry, and the 1953 Iranian coup d'état, as well as his membership in the European Confederation of Iranian Students and the German Student Movement. He also delves into his academic experiences at Tehran University, Paris Institute of Sociology, and Heidelberg University in Germany.

Although these conversations are centered around Ashtiani's political and academic memories, with each chapter dedicated to one of his periods and stages of activity in political parties and organizations, as well as his studies at Iranian and foreign universities, they also touch on his theoretical reflections and social experiences in Iran and Germany. Along with memories of the victory of the revolution, the book provides interesting data and analyses of the pre-revolutionary period. The story of imprisonment and expulsion from the university during the post-revolution era, and his remaining in Iran, which is the subject of two chapters in the book, adds freshness for the readers. The most significant difference between this book and other Iranian Oral History books before and after the revolution can be considered the significant attention to the issue of thought, especially the university institution. It starts with an analytical review of Ashtiani's education at Tehran University – as the top-ranked student and recipient of a scholarship for further studies at this university, which included the Faculty of Literature at Tehran University at that time – and continues with an examination of his memories and reflections on the structure of the French and German university systems. It also covers his efforts to interact with left-wing student and party intellectuals in Germany and his illegal trip to Hungary to meet with György Lukács, a prominent Marxist philosopher. Upon his return to Iran, the experience of teaching at various universities before and after the revolution, as well as the situation of philosophy and social sciences, becomes a subject of inquiry. In particular, historical sociology and cognitive sociology, which can be considered Ashtiani's founding and most important figure in this theoretical branch in Iran. Moreover, reflections on the reasons for the revolution and the final chapter on examining the current state of Iranian thought and society, which concludes with questions about the aspirations and ideals of this 88-year-old thinker for the future of Iran.
