= Mehrdad Khonsari =

Iranian diplomat and politician (born 1949)

- مِهرداد خوانساری
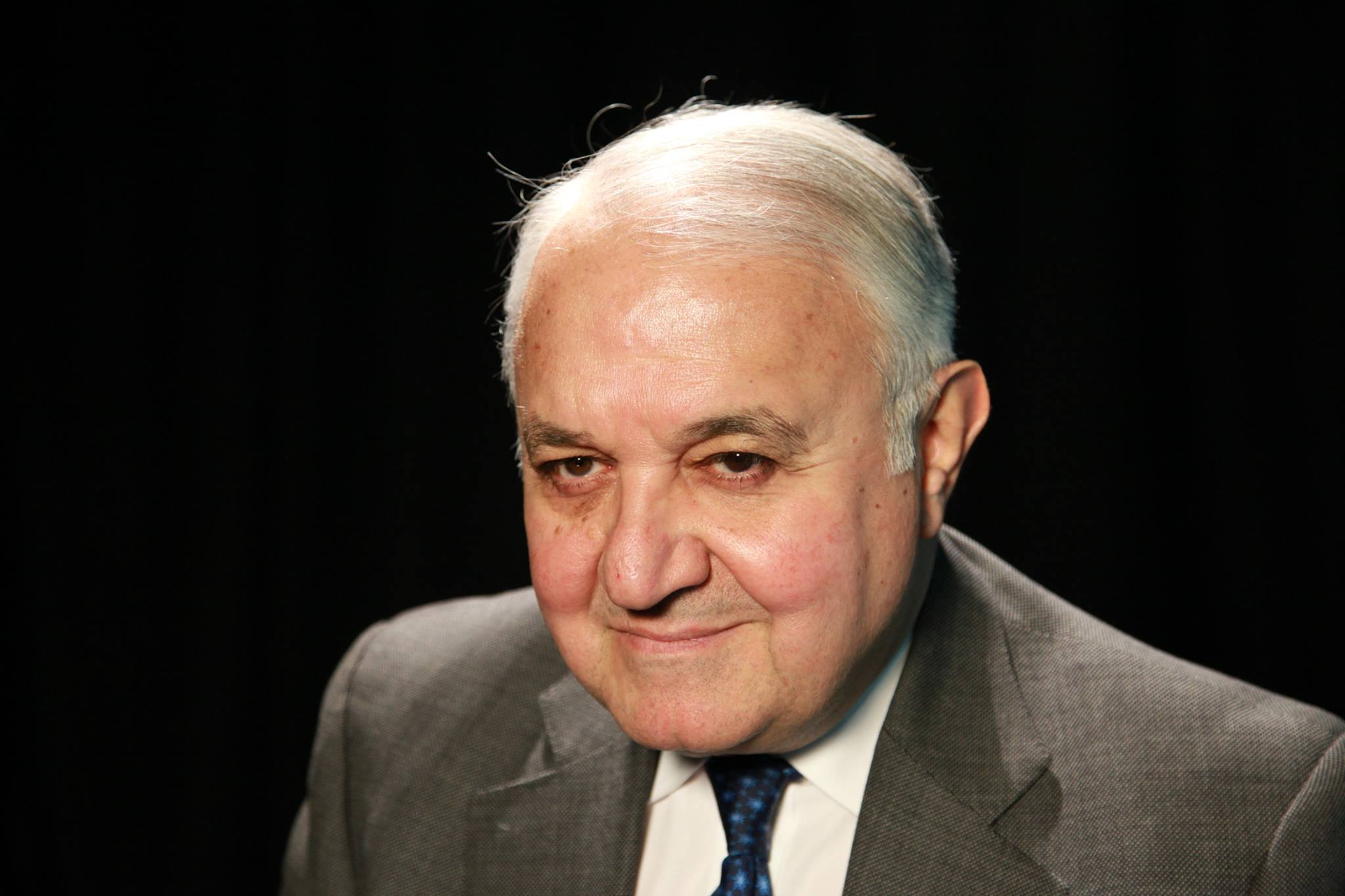
- Born: September 30, 1949 (age 76)
- Other names: International relations (Masters Degree and PhD)
- Education: Georgetown University; London School of Economics; Fletcher School of Law and Diplomacy
- Occupations: Diplomat and veteran politician
- Known for: Mandana Alebouyeh
- Children: 2 daughters (Bibinaz and Golnaz)
- Father: Parviz Khonsari

Mehrdad Khonsari (born September 30, 1949 (age 76), Persian: مهرداد خوانساری) is a former Iranian diplomat and veteran politician, prominent Iranian opposition figure.

== Family background ==
Mehrdad Khonsari is the third son of Parviz khonsari (a prominent Iranian statesman) and Asefe Asefi (president of Iran's Parents Teaches Association (1967–1979) and university professor). He is the great-grandson of Ghaem Magham Farahani. He is married to Mandana Alebhouyeh and together they have two daughters, Bibinaz (born 1980) and Golnaz (born 1990).

== Academic background ==
Mehrdad Khonsari received his primary and secondary schooling in Iran, Ireland, France, England and the United States where he was awarded a high school diploma in 1967 from Bellaire Senior High School in Houston, Texas.

Mehrdad Khonsari next attended New York University to study Electrical Engineering before transferring to the Walsh School of Foreign Service at Georgetown University in Washington, D.C. were in 1972 he received his undergraduate degree (Bachelor of Science in Foreign Service). Following his entry into the Iranian Foreign Service, he was later sent on a scholarship to The Fletcher School of Law and Diplomacy where he completed his master's degree in 1976 which was followed in 1978 with an M.A.L.D. (Master of Art in Law and Diplomacy). Although Mehrdad Khonsari was admitted to the Fletcher School's PhD program, the completion of his thesis was disrupted by the advent of the Iranian Revolution. However, having switched to the London School of Economics and Political science (LSE), he was able to obtain his PhD in the field of International Relations in 1995. His thesis was titled The National Movement of the Iranian Resistance 1979-1991: The role of a banned opposition movement in international politics.

== Diplomatic career ==
Having begun his internship at the Iranian Ministry of Foreign Affairs in 1968 (serving in Tehran, Washington and the UN in New York), and having passed the MFA's entrance examinations, Mehrdad Khonsari began his diplomatic career in 1972. From 1973 to 1975, prior to being posted to the Iranian mission to the United Nations, he served as a member of the secretariat of the Iranian minister of foreign affairs. In 1977, he was transferred to the Iranian embassy in London, where he also became a visiting research fellow at the International Institute for Strategic Studies. In June 1978 he was placed in charge of the embassy's cultural section prior to becoming press attaché following the start of unrest leading to the Iranian Revolution.

Following the execution of former foreign minister, Abbas Ali Khalatbari, Mehrdad Khonsari ended his diplomatic career by resigning from the Iranian Foreign Ministry. During his period as an Iranian diplomat, Mehrdad Khonsari also served as a member of the Iranian delegation to the 23rd, 24th, 25th, 29th and 31st Sessions of the UN General Assembly in New York; the ‘Summer Sessions’ of the UN Economic & Social Council, July-Aug 1976 and July–August 1977; as well as the 10th Special Session of the UN General Assembly on Disarmament May–July 1978.

== Post-diplomatic career ==
From 1979 to 1984, Mehrdad Khonsari worked as a consultant in international affairs for the Saudi Arabian multinational business organization, the Shobokshi Group while at the same serving as the managing director of the UK-based Middle Eastern Charitable Trust, the Avicenna Foundation (which was later transformed into the Centre for Arab and Iranian Studies, where Mehrdad Khonsari was senior research fellow from 1992 to 2010).

Since 1984, Mehrdad Khonsari has been an Iranian political activist having served as an adviser to Prime Minister Shapour Bakhtiar (1984–87) and Reza Pahlavi, the former crown prince of Iran (1987–1991). Since 1991, he has served as secretary general of Front Line – the Constitutionalist Movement of Iran (1991–2010), member of the Iran Referendum Campaign (2004–2005) and as secretary general of Green Wave (2010–2014). Since January 2015, Mehrdad Khonsari is secretary general of the newly established but currently inactive Organization for Economic Reconstruction and National Reconciliation (BAAM).

== Research, publications and media activities ==
Mehrdad Khonsari was a visiting research fellow at the International Institute For Strategic Studies (1978). In 1977 and 1978, he had travelled to Kuwait, Bahrain, Qatar, U.A.E., Saudi Arabia and Yemen on research mission for the Ministry of Foreign Affairs on the subject of Iran-Arab relations and how best to expand and enhance them in the future.

Mehrdad Khonsari was editor of the London-based Iranfile, an independent monthly analysis of current affairs and Khate Moghaddam with special emphasis on economics and politics. Apart from numerous TV broadcasts and articles in Persian and English, he has conducted extensive research and participated in many international conferences in various countries in Europe, North America, the Middle East and the South Caucuses. From 2005 to 2008, he was managing director of Payam Azadi TV (based in Los Angeles) and from 2012 to 2014, he was chairman of the board of governors of ‘Raha TV’, a London-based satellite television station operating for audiences in Iran. For 2 years, Mehrdad Khonsari as the only guest of the weekly program ‘Bardashte Dovom’, provided up to date commentary and analysis concerning various aspects of political realities in Iran. Mehrdad Khonsari is a senior consultant and a founding member of the Iranian Centre for Policy Studies established in France in 2017.
