= Manuchihr of Konus =

Manucihr was an Iranian dynast of an unknown place called Konus in the Pars Province. He was killed in the 200s by the Persian prince Ardashir I, who would later establish the Sasanian Empire.

== Sources ==
- Al-Tabari, Abu Ja'far Muhammad ibn Jarir (1985–2007). Ehsan Yar-Shater (ed.). The History of Al-Ṭabarī. Vol. 40 vols. Albany, NY: State University of New York Press.
- Miri, Negin (2009). Historical Geography of Fars during the Sasanian Period (PDF). University of Sydney. pp. 1–65. Archived from the original (PDF) on 2016-04-04.
- Greatrex, Geoffrey; Lieu, Samuel N. C. (2002). The Roman Eastern Frontier and the Persian Wars (Part II, 363–630 AD). New York and London: Routledge. ISBN 0-415-14687-9.
