= Mohammad Reza Darafsheh =

Iranian mathematician

- Education: University of Tehran (B.Sc. 1974); University of Birmingham (M.Sc. 1975); University of Birmingham (Ph.D. 1978)
- Scientific career
- Fields: Group theory
- Workplaces: Shahid Chamran University of Ahvaz (1978–89); University of Tehran (1989–present)
- Thesis: On some Subgroups of C_1 (1978)
- Doctoral advisor: Donald Livingstone
- Doctoral students: Bijan Davvaz

Mohammad Reza Darafsheh (born 31 August 1950) is an Iranian Mathematician and Professor of Mathematics at the University of Tehran, and a member of the executive committee of the Iranian Mathematical Society.

He received a B.Sc. in Mathematics from the University of Tehran with first rank in 1974 and M.Sc. and Ph.D. degrees from University of Birmingham in 1975 and 1978 respectively under the supervision of Donald Livingston. His dissertation was titled "On some Subgroups of C_1." He has been a faculty member at the Shahid Chamran University of Ahvaz from 1978 to 1989, and from 1989 to present at the University of Tehran, where he chaired the mathematics department from 1995 to 1999 he has advised 33 Ph.D. students.

His research area includes the representations and characters of finite groups, symmetry class of tensors, Thomson's conjecture, characterization of simple groups by the set of elements order. He has solved the Feit's conjecture on the p-Steinberg characters of finite groups. He has contributed to finding the character tables of linear groups. He has authored the books "An introduction to group theory", "Linear groups", and a 3 volume book titled "Algebra" which was included in "Eighty Treasures" in 2008 as part of the 80th anniversary of University of Tehran's establishment.

He was awarded the Abdus-Salam prize in Mathematics by International Centre for Theoretical Physics in 1990, and the Khwarizmi International Award in 1997.
