= Farideh Heyat =

British-Iranian anthropologist

- Born: 20 June 1949 (age 77); Tehran, Iran
- Education: Ankara University; School of Oriental and African Studies
- Scientific career
- Fields: Women's studies Anthropology
- Workplaces: School of Oriental and African Studies
- Thesis: Career, Family and Femininity: Sovietisation among Muslim Azeri Women (1999)
- Website: http://www.faridehheyat.co.uk/about

Farideh Heyat (Persian: فریده هیئت, born 20 June 1949 in Tehran) is a British-Iranian anthropologist and a writer based in London, England. She is a retired lecturer of SOAS, University of London and American University of Central Asia in Bishkek, Kyrgyzstan. Heyat is the author of numerous articles on women in Azerbaijan and Kyrgyzstan. She is also the author of the following books: Azeri Women in Transition: Women in Soviet and post-Soviet Azerbaijan and The Land of Forty Tribes.

== Early life ==
Heyat was born to Azeri parents. She spent her childhood in Tehran, growing up bilingual in Persian and Azeri languages.

== Education ==
After graduating from school, she moved to Turkey for a year and studied physics at Ankara University. To follow her higher education, she moved to London in 1967. Her first degree was in computing and statistics. Following that, she obtained a master's degree in computer science. She then switched her subject and began her studies in social anthropology at SOAS University of London, where she obtained an MA in anthropology, followed by Ph.D. in the subject.

== Career ==
After a couple of years of working in the computer industry, she trained as a teacher and began teaching computing at further education colleges in London, until 1989. She started her career in teaching anthropology and development studies in SOAS after obtaining her Ph.D. in 1999. In 2002 she started teaching these subjects at American University of Central Asia.

== Research ==
From 1992 until 1997, she conducted research on the historical situation of women in Azerbaijan and the post-soviet changes for them. During 2002 to 2003 she traveled and did research across Kyrgyzstan and Uzbekistan on women, culture, and society of the region.

== Bibliography ==
=== Books ===
- Azeri Women in Transition: Women in Soviet and Post-Soviet Azerbaijan, Routledge, 2002.
- Land of Forty Tribes, Hertfordshire Press, 2015

=== Book chapters ===
- Post-Soviet Islam in Azerbaijan, Cultural Archetypes and Political Change in the Caucasus, Nino Tsetsishvili (ed.), Nova Science Publishers, 2010
- Women and the Culture of Entrepreneurship in Azerbaijan, Markets and Moralities: ethnographies of post-socialism, R. Mandell & C. Humphrey (eds.), London: Berg, 2002
- Azeri Professional Women's Life Strategies in the Soviet Context, Gender and Identity Construction: Women of Central Asia The Caucasus and Turkey, F.Acar and A. Ayata (eds.), E.J. Brill, Boston, USA, 2000
- The Azaris, Some Minorities in the Middle East, R. Tapper (ed.), Centre for Near and Middle Eastern Studies, SOAS, University of London, 1992

=== Journal articles ===
- New Veiling in Azerbaijan: gender and globalizing Islam, European Journal of Women's Studies, vol. 15, no.4, October 2008
- Globalisation and Changing Gender Norms in Azerbaijan, International Feminist Journal of Politics, vol. 8, no.3, September 2006
- Re-Islamisation in Kyrgyzstan: gender, new poverty, and the moral dimension, Central Asian Survey, vol.23, no.3-4, Dec. 2004
