= Morteza Mohasses =

Iranian football coach and instructor

Morteza Mohases
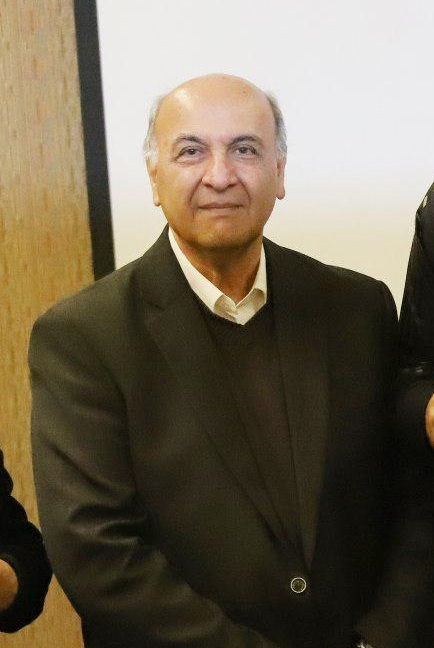
- Mohasses in 2019

Personal information
- Full name: Morteza Mohases

Managerial career
- Years: Team
- 2002–2003: Esteghlal (coach)
- 2003–2004: Pas (coach)
- 2007–2008: Tractor Sazi (coach)
- 2009–2011: Esteghlal (coach)
- 2009–2011: Iran (coach)

Morteza Mohases (Persian: مرتضی محصص) is an Iranian football coach and instructor. He also works as a FIFA coaching instructor.

Mohases has previously worked as assistant coach of German coach Roland Koch at Esteghlal F.C. during the club's unsuccessful 2002-03 season.

Mohases was part of FIFA's technical study group for the 2007 FIFA U-20 World Cup.
