= Mina Izadyar =

Iranian professor and pediatrician

Dr.Mina Izadyar
- Born: Mina Izadyar; October 1, 1949
- Died: June 21, 2013 (aged 63)
- Education: Hematologist-Oncologist
- Occupations: Founder and Chairwoman of the Iranian Thalassemia Society
- Spouse: Parviz Malekpour

Dr. Mina Izadyar (Persian: دکتر مینا ایزدیار) was a prominent Iranian professor and pediatrician in the field of hematology and oncology. Her efforts and research alongside her colleagues resulted in the reduction of live-born infants with acute Thalassemia from 2500 to just 300 per year. She was also co-founder and director of Iranian Thalassemia Society

== Career ==
Throughout her life, Izadyar achieved numerous notable accomplishments. She was the founder of the Iranian Thalassemia Society, co-founder and executive board member of Iranian Pediatric Hematology-Oncology Society and a professor at Shahid Beheshti University of Medical Sciences. A pediatrician and hematologist-oncologist by training, she also served as chairwoman of the Iranian Thalassemia Society's board of directors, a ward manager at a number of top Tehran hospitals and the head of hematology-and-oncology ward at Children's Medical Center [affiliated to Tehran University of Medical Sciences] and member of Mahak Board of Trustees. There have been many publications left from her work and research. She has also contributed to the book The Thalassaemia Syndromes. One of her notable colleagues, Mardawig Alebouyeh describes her achievements as: "Collaboration with other colleagues in planning and setting-up programs to curb the incidence of major beta-thalassemia as a major social health problem in Iran. These programs, which have been approved and supported by health authorities, include premarital screening for beta-thalassemia trait, which is enforced by law and applied country-wide as well as prenatal diagnosis and abortion of homozygous fetus. Furthermore, she initiated, established and directed the Iranian Thalassemia Society which supervised and enforced the application of standard treatment protocols for patients with major beta-thalassemia throughout the country. By engaging personal energy and perseverance she was able to establish adjacent to each Blood Transfusion center in Iran a specialized clinic to provide medical care, supervision and blood transfusion. Through her relentless effort in significantly reducing cases of live-born infants with acute thalassemia (now 300 vs. 2500 per year before), elder thalassemia patients now enjoy a better life quality, much higher life expectancy and more active social partnership as a result".

== Religion ==
Mina was a Zoroastrian. Her husband also served as the Zoroastrians representative member of parliament in Iran.

== Death ==
Izadyar died from cancer on 21 June 2013. There has been many scientists in the field who expressed their condolences after her death which were published by Thalasemia International Federation. It was also announce by Sorena Sattari that a research chair in memory of her will be established.

== See also ==
- Iranian women
- Zoroastrianism
