= Behrouz Souresrafil =

Iranian journalist (1951–2022)

- Born: بهروز صوراسرافیل; 12 February 1951; Tehran, Iran
- Died: 9 November 2022 (aged 71); Virginia, U.S.
- Occupation: Journalist

Behrouz Souresrafil (Persian: بهروز صوراسرافیل; 12 February 1951 – 9 November 2022) was an Iranian journalist. Before the revolution, he was working as an editor-in-chief of Ayandegan and various magazines. Like many other journalists, he immigrated to France after the revolution and published a newspaper titled Iran o Jahan (Iran and the World). He was also for some time the editor-in-chief of the newspaper Kayhan London. He immigrated to the United States in 1998.

Souresrafil was the editor-in-chief of the Shabahang program at VOA-PNN. He was a royalist and a secularist.

Souresrafil died on 9 November 2022, at the age of 71.
