= Seyed Hossein Mirfakhar =

Iranian politician and ambassador

Ambassador of Iran in Indonesia
- In office 1986–1990
- President: Ali Khamenei
- Foreign Minister: Ali Akbar Velayati

Ambassador of Iran in People's Republic of China
- In office 1994–1998
- President: Akbar Hashemi Rafsanjani
- Foreign Minister: Ali Akbar Velayati

Ambassador of Iran in Republic of Ireland
- In office 2002–2005
- President: Mohammad Khatami
- Foreign Minister: Kamal Kharazi

Ambassador of Iran in Portugal
- In office 2015–2019
- President: Hassan Rohani
- Foreign Minister: Mohammad Javad Zarif
- Preceded by: Hossein Gharibi
- Succeeded by: Morteza Damanpak Jami

Personal details
- Born: 21 April 1952 (age 73) Tehran, Iran
- Occupation: Politician; Diplomat; Ambassador

Seyed Hossein Mirfakhar is an Iranian politician and ambassador.

Seyed Hossein Mirfakhar, son of Haj Seyed Esmaeel, was born on April 21, 1952, in Tehran. He is a graduate of political science from the National University of Iran, currently known as Shahid Beheshti University.

After the Islamic Revolution, in 1980, he joined the Political Directorate of the Ministry of Foreign Affairs. After going through training in various fields, in 1981, during Ali Akbar Velayati’s term as Minister of Foreign Affairs, he was appointed Head of the Consular Department (Personal Status and Registration) and served in this position until 1986. In the same year, Mirfakhar was appointed as the Ambassador of the Islamic Republic of Iran in Indonesia. During his ambassadorship to Indonesia, he was the source of outstanding services regarding cultural development. After returning to Iran in 1990, he was appointed Director General of Political Affairs in South East Asian Region until 1994, when he headed to Beijing with dual accreditation: as the Ambassador of the Islamic Republic of Iran in the People's Republic of China and Republic of Mongolia.

After returning from China in 1998, during Seyed Kamal Kharazi's term as the minister, Mirfakhar was appointed Director General for Administrative Affairs. With the minister's recommendation, he worked on the revival and implementation of the Internal Regulation of the Ministry of Foreign Affairs and brought some other administrative reforms. Later, in 2002, he moved to Dublin as the Ambassador of the Islamic Republic of Iran in the Republic of Ireland. After completing his mission and returning from the Republic of Ireland in 2005, he served as Senior Expert in Political Studies.

In 2006, he was appointed the Director General of Consular Affairs and served for eight years. During Mohammad Javad Zarif's term as the Minister of Foreign Affairs, in March 2015, he became the Ambassador of the Islamic Republic of Iran in Republic of Portugal. He moved to Lisbon. In May 2019, after 40 years he terminated his duties in Foreign Ministry at his request. He is one of the experienced diplomats of the Iranian Ministry of Foreign Affairs who has been successfully promoted in the hierarchy of political officials and has been granted the lifetime designation of “Ambassador” for his distinguished services.
