= Manouchehr Hakim =

Manouchehr Hakim (died 1981) was an Iranian physician and anatomist. Hakim was the founder and head of the Department of Anatomy at the University of Tehran. He stayed in Iran after the revolution and was imprisoned and killed by the Islamic Republic of Iran for being a member of the Baháʼí faith.
