= Reza Ghoflsaz =

Iranian footballer

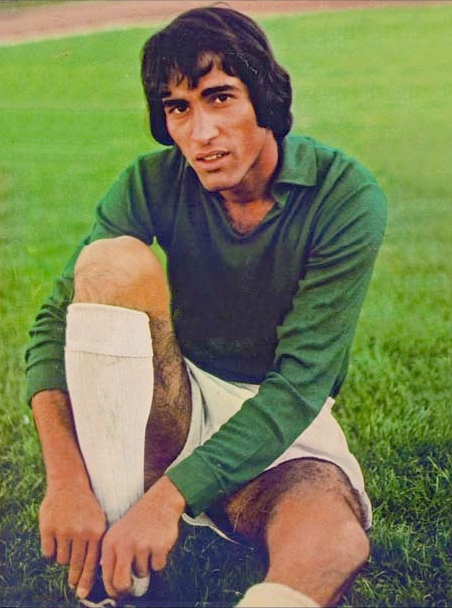

Personal information
- Date of birth: 21 February 1951 (age 75)
- Place of birth: Ahvaz, Iran
- Position: Goalkeeper

Senior career*
Years	Team	Apps	(Gls)
1973–1978	PAS		
- * Club domestic league appearances and goals

Reza Ghoflsaz (Persian: رضا قفلساز, born 21 February 1951) is a retired Iranian association football goalkeeper.

Ghofsaz was born in Ahvaz, as a third child in a family of eight siblings, but later moved to Tehran. He was part of the Iranian national U-19 teams that competed at the 1969 and 1970 AFC Youth Championships and won a bronze medal in 1969. At the club level he played for Persepolis F.C. and won the national title in 1974 and 1976. Ghogflsaz holds an Iranian record for the longest clean sheet time, at 794 minutes.
