= Manouchehr Parchami =

Iranian water polo player

Personal information
- Full name: Manouchehr Parchami Araghi
- Nationality: Iranian
- Born: 12 October 1952 (age 72)

Sport
- Sport: Water polo

Manouchehr Parchami Araghi (born 12 October 1952) is an Iranian water polo player. He competed in the men's tournament at the 1976 Summer Olympics.
