= Ali Eghbali Dogaheh =

Iranian fighter pilot (1949–1980)

- علی اقبالی دوگاهه
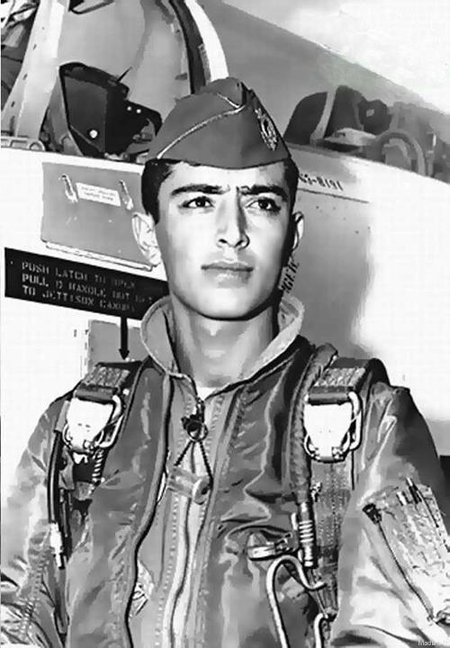
- Born: 29 September 1949; Roudbar, Pahlavi Iran
- Died: 1980 (aged 30–31); Near Mosul, Ba'athist Iraq
- Burial place: Behesht-e Zahra
- Military career
- Allegiance: Iran
- Branch: Islamic Republic of Iran Air Force Imperial Iranian Air Force
- Service years: 1967–1980
- Rank: Major
- Conflicts: Iran–Iraq War (POW); Operation Kaman 99

Ali Eghbali Dogahe (Persian: سید علی اقبالی دوگاهه) (29 September 1949 – 23 October 1980) was an Iranian pilot and major general in the Islamic Republic of Iran Air Force (IRIAF) during the Iran-Iraq War. His date of death cannot be confirmed, as he died while he was a prisoner of war in Iraq.

== Education and career ==
He was born on 29 September 1949, in Dogahe, Roudbar, Gilan province. After graduating from Amir Kabir High School, he joined the Imperial Iranian Air Force (IIAF) on 4 December 1967.

Having successfully finished the military training, English course, and flight preparatory courses with a prop aircraft and T-33 jet trainer, he was dispatched to Williams Air Force Base in Phoenix, Arizona. He mastered advanced aircraft piloting and flying with fighter jets and then returned to Iran. He resumed his duty in the IIAF on 24 January 1970 as tactical fighter jet pilot. In 1974, he was sent again to the United States to attend a training course in aerial photography interpretation, and aerial intelligence, and mission management.

== Personal life ==
He was married to Farideh Hashemi in 1975. They had one son, called Afshin. On one occasion, when asked by his wife why he loved to fly so much, he answered, "Because flying brings us more closer to God."

== The Iran-Iraq war ==
Soon after the beginning of the Iran-Iraq War in 1980, he voluntarily joined the combat forces of the nascent Islamic Republic of Iran Air Force (IRIAF). Despite having the option of living comfortably in the U.S. as a flight instructor, he refused the offer in order to stay in Iran and join the IRIAF. He has been named by the Iranian media as the youngest flight instructor in the air force, teaching and training other notably famous Iranian pilots, such as Abbas Babaei and Mostafa Ardestani. Besides this role as instructor, he took part in leading daily combat operations and raids deep in Iraq. He was considered one of the best-trained and most professional pilots of the IRIAF.

== Last mission and death ==
In his last mission, Major General Eghbali was the leader of a group of fighter jets when they were instructed to bombard a base in Mosul on 23 October 1980.

Having arrived at the first planned site, two Northrop F-5 fighter jets were not able to find their first target and redirected their route to a base in the neighbourhood of Kirkuk Air Base. After bombardment of this base and en route back to Iran, Ali Eghbali's jet was shot down by a SAM of the Iraqi Air Force in the airspace east of Mosul. He managed to eject before his plane crashed.

Since this incident, there has been no confirmed report of his situation, but he was believed to have been captured by Iraqi forces shortly after reaching the ground.

There had also been no confirmed reports of his death since he went missing until his body parts were returned to Iran on 27 July 2002. It is assumed that he was killed or died while being a prisoner of war in Iraq. His wife confirmed that the body parts belong to Ali Eghbali Dogahe, and they were buried in Behesht-e Zahra.

According to confirmed sources, he was severely tortured and beaten, only to be later dismembered between two jeeps on Iraqi President Saddam Hussein's direct orders. Trying to hide this heinous war crime, the Iraqis buried half of his body in a cemetery in Nineveh, and the other half was buried in a cemetery in Mosul. Based on the follow-up of the Prisoners and Missing War Veterans Searching Committee, belonging to the International Red Crescent, and along with the bodies of several other pilots from the IRIAF, his remains were returned to Iran after 22 years of being away from the country.
