= Mohammed Taheri =

Iranian diplomat

Mohammad Taheri

Personal details
- Born: Mohammad Taheri; February 4, 1952 (age 74) Macoo, Iran
- Party: Independent
- Children: 2
- Profession: Diplomat; President of Iran Portugal Business Council; President of Iran Spain Business Council

Mohammed Taheri (Persian: محمد طاهری, born 4 February 1952) was the Iranian Ambassador in Portugal. He has held various significant diplomatic posts since the 1980s. He is the president of the Business Council of Iran-Portugal (IPBC) as well as the Business Council of Iran-Spain (ISBC).

== Early life and education ==
Mohammad Taheri was born in Macoo, Azarbayjan province northwest of Iran. Taheri studied his bachelor at Tehran University. At age 25 he left Iran for the United States to attend to Texas University to grant his MBA degree, he obtained a second MBA in International Relation from Azad University in 1995 and this was followed by a PhD from Poland university in International Relation. He is married with two children. His native language is Persian but he is fluent in English as well as Turkish.

== Career ==
He started his diplomatic career in Ministry of Iran from 1980s. First, Taheri was Consul General in Istanbul and after 5 years he returned home and became the Director of Ministry of Foreign Affairs (M.F.A.), then he upgraded to Director of Political Office and in 1989 he became Ambassador in New Zealand and after 4 years he returned home and became director of Political Office in M.F.A. then he served as Chargé d'Affaires of Iranian embassy in Baku in absence of Ambassador. After one year he became Ambassador of Poland for 4 years. Taheri came back to his homeland in 2001 and became Director General of Economic affairs in M.F.A. and for his last post in Ministry of Foreign Affairs he became Ambassador of Iran in Portugal. He got retired in 2008 and now he is the President of Business Counsel of Iran-Portugal(IPBC) and President of Business Counsel of Iran-Spain (ISBC). Taheri also started an online campaign for rehabilitation and reconstruction of Urmia Lake.

== Holocaust denial ==
He became notorious for a radio interview to RDP/Antena1, on February 14, 2006 in which he questioned the death toll of the Holocaust - "When I was ambassador in Warsaw, I visited Auschwitz and Birkenau twice and made my calculations. To incinerate 6 million people, 15 years would be necessary."
