= Manouchehr Atashi =

Iranian writer (1931–2005)

- منوچهر آتشی
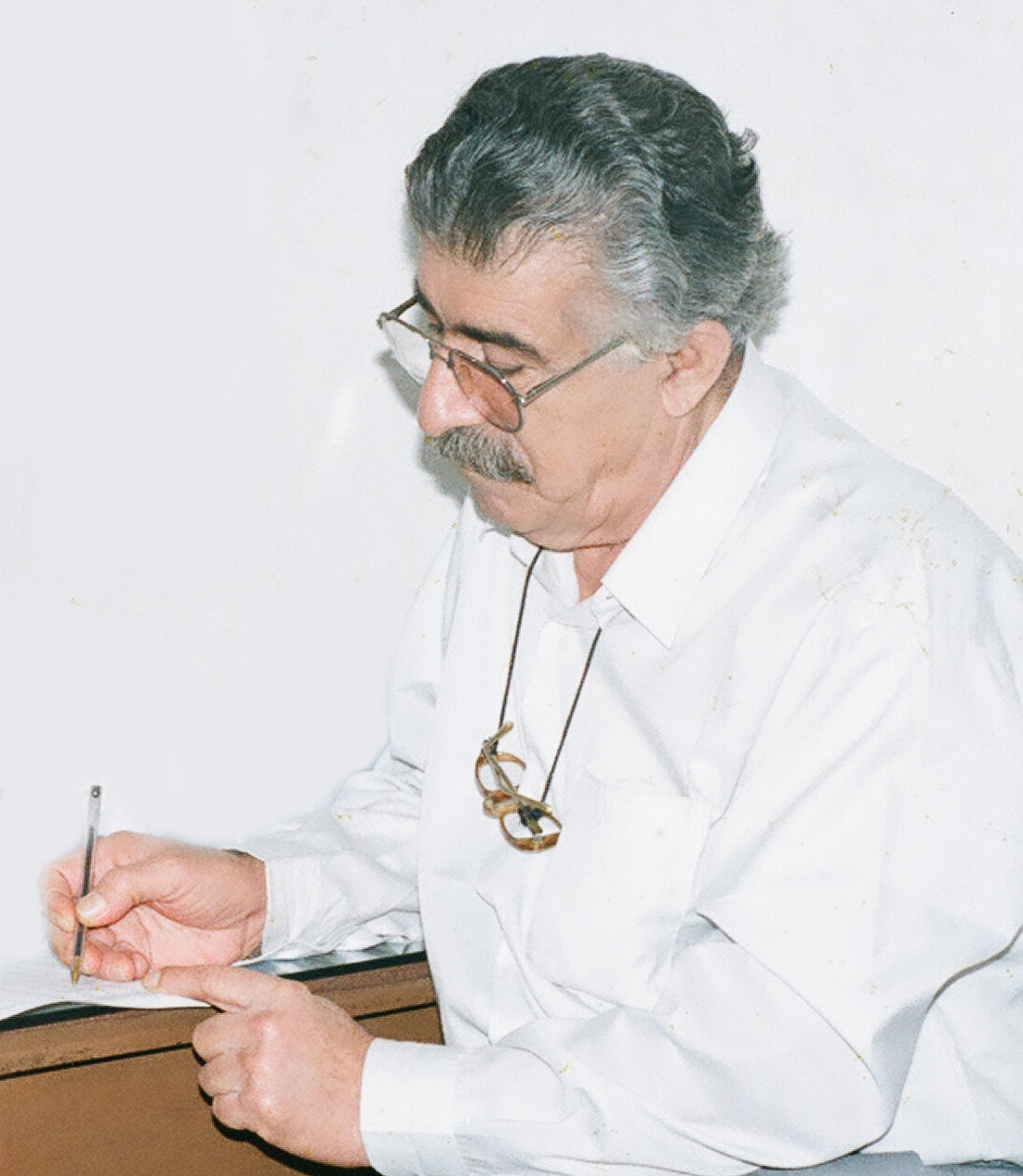
- Born: September 25, 1931; Dashtestan, Iran
- Died: November 20, 2005 (aged 74); Tehran, Iran
- Resting place: Booshehr
- Occupations: Poet, writer, interpreter and journalist.

Manouchehr Atashi (September 25, 1931 – November 20, 2005; Persian: منوچهر آتشی) was a Persian poet, writer, and journalist of Kurdish descent.

He was born in 1931 in Dashtestan, Bushehr province. His poetry is the poetry of the revolting warrior of the humiliated southern tribesman. He takes his work seriously and although attached to his native birthplace his poems are universal scope. In his later works Atashi has relaxed his rhythm and has moved toward direct expression of emotion.

== Works ==
- Poetry Collections by Atashi:
- Āhang-e digar (Another melody), Tehran, 1959
- Āvāz-e ḵāk (The song of the earth), Tehran, 1967
- Bar entehā-ye aḡāz (At the end of the beginning), Tehran, 1972
- Bārān-e barg-e ḏowq: daftar-e ḡazalhā (The rain of joy: the book of ghazals), with ʿAbdol-Majid Zanguʾi, Tehran, 2001
- Če talḵ ast in sib (How bitter is this apple), Tehran, 1999
- Didār dar falaq (Meeting at dawn), Tehran, 1970
- Ettefāq-e āḵar (The last event), Tehran, 2001
- Gozina-ye ašʿār (Selected poems), Tehran, 1987
- Gandom o gilās (The wheat and the cherry), Tehran, 1992
- Ḡazal-e ḡazalhā-ye Sorenā (The ghazals of Sorena), Tehran, 2005
- Ḥādeṯa dar bāmdād (The event at dawn), Tehran, 2001
- Ḵalij o ḵazar (The Gulf and the Caspian), Tehran, 2002
- Majmuʿa-ye ašʿār (Collected poems), Tehran, 2007
- Rišahā-ye šab (The roots of the night), Tehran, 2005
- Vaṣf-e gol-e suri (In praise of the red rose), Tehran, 1992
- Zibā tar az šekl-e qadim-e jahān (More beautiful than the old shape of the world), Tehran, 1997
