= 2009 Iranian pro-government rallies =

Iranian rallies

30 December 2009 Iranian pro-government rallies
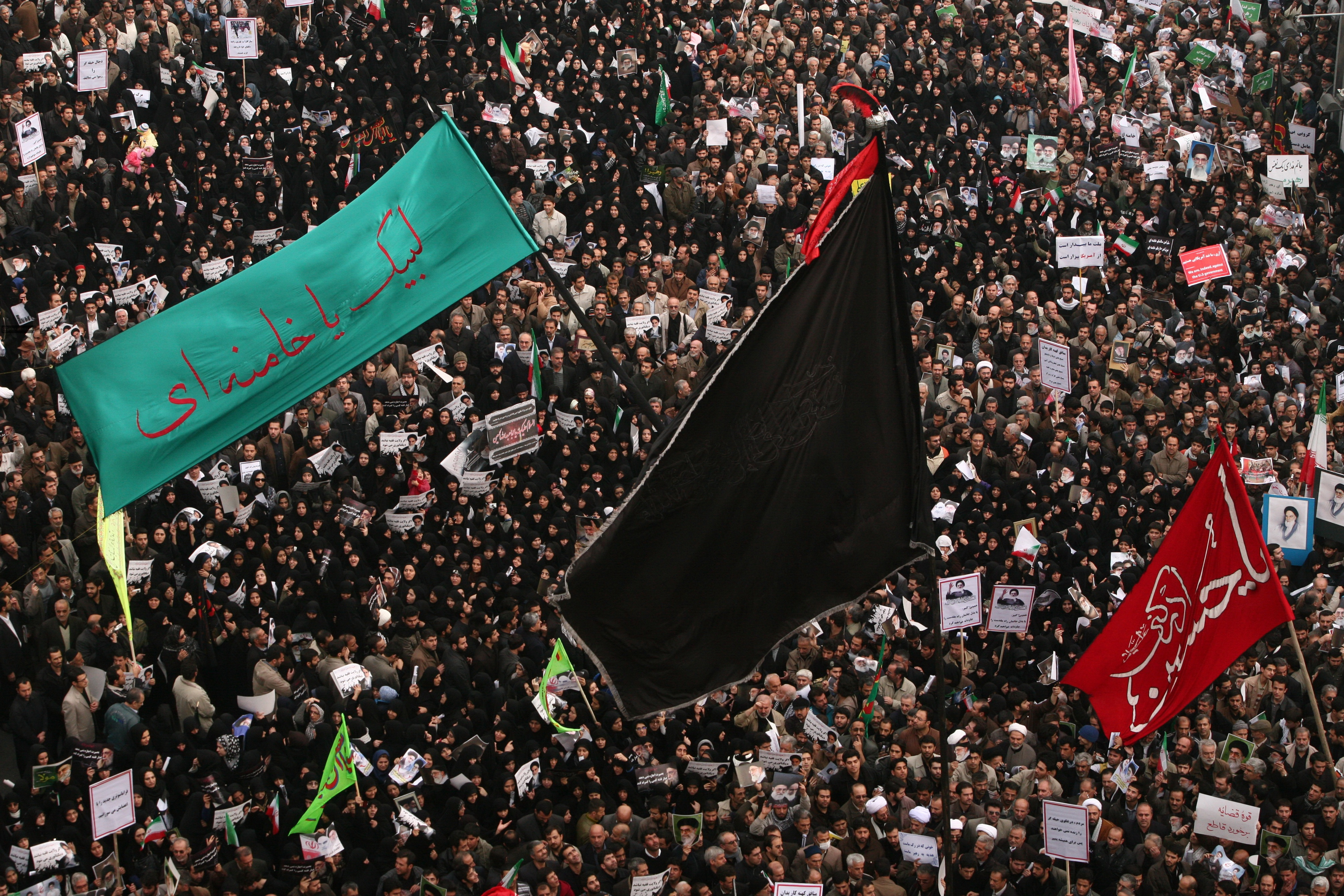
- Pro-government protestors at a rally in Tehran
- Date: 30 December 2009
- Location: Various cities in Iran
- Cause: In response to anti-government protests held three days earlier

On 30 December 2009, pro-government rallies, also known as the "Dey 9 epic", took place in various Iranian cities, including Tehran, Shiraz, Arak, Qom and Isfahan. The rallies were hold in response to the Ashura protests, where protesters on that day did acts including "applauding, whistling, and engaging in other cheerful displays," which was viewed as violation of a "red line" and targeting Husayn ibn Ali and Ashura commemoration itself. The demonstrations and counter-demonstrations were connected to the disputed 2009 Iranian presidential election.

== Background ==
In protest against the results of the 2009 Iranian presidential election and the death of Hussein-Ali Montazeri, the former deputy supreme leader of Iran, demonstrators took to the streets on 27 December 2009, coinciding with Ashura, a Shia holy day. According to Ibrahim Moussawi, associate professor of Lebanese University and head of Hizbullah's media relations, the incident damaged "public relations" of the Iranian Green Movement with Iranian citizenry more than all events as the acts of the protesters on that day including "applauding, whistling, and engaging in other cheerful displays," was "widely" seen as violation of a "red line" and targeting Husayn ibn Ali and Ashura commemoration itself. Lolagar mosque in Tehran was set into fire by the "rioters", according to the State TV of Iran leading to death of "few" people in mosque. Various society groups including "marej-'e taqlid, the society of Iranian doctors, university student groups, the Iranian Parliament, Oil Industry Workers, the Iranian Women's Culture and Education Society, the Society of Iranian Teachers, the Iranian Professors Society, provincial governors, municipalities and bazaars" expressed their condemnation and many of them publicly asked for the "prosecution of the opposition leaders".

In response to the Ashura protests, pro-government protesters hold a rally in a "show of force" three days later on 30 December (9 Dey in the Persian calendar) to condemn Green Movement protesters.

== Rally ==
A witness said, according to The New York Times, that "many demonstrators on Wednesday were taken to protest sites by dozens of buses and were given free chocolate milk, and the Associated Press said the government had given all civil servants the day off to attend the rallies". Participants numbered in the tens or hundreds of thousands. Slogans included "O free-willed leader, we are ready, we are ready" and "Death to Moussavi," Speakers included Ayatollah Ahmad Alamolhoda, and speakers called on opposition leaders to repent from their opposition to the government or be declared "enemies of God" and face the death penalty.

== Population ==
Observers differed on the size or representativeness of the demonstrations. One source called the main rally in the capital "possibly the largest crowd in the streets of Tehran since Ayatollah Ruhollah Khomeini's funeral in 1989." But this was challenged by another source which stated that satellite pictures of the demonstration showed it having "far, far fewer people there than at recent opposition rallies, which numbered in the millions," and that instead of congregating in Azadi Square in Tehran, where the regime had "traditionally organized mass rallies to intimidate the opposition and the world", the rally was held in "a much smaller square" in the middle of city.

== Commemoration ==
The pro-government protest is commemorated annually in various cities of Iran.

== See also ==
- 2009 Iranian election protests
- Iranian reform movement
- Iranian revolution
- Politics of Iran
- 2009 Iran poll protests trial
