= Timeline of the 2009 Iranian election protests =

Following the 2009 Iranian presidential election, protests against alleged electoral fraud and in support of opposition candidates Mir-Hossein Mousavi and Mehdi Karroubi occurred in Tehran and other major cities in Iran and around the world starting after the disputed presidential election on 2009 June 12 and continued even after the inauguration of Mahmoud Ahmedinejad as President of Iran on 5 August 2009. This is a timeline of the events which occurred during those protests.

== 2009 ==
=== June ===
==== June 13–15 ====
In what had become the worst civil unrest in Iran in over a decade, clashes broke out between police and groups protesting the election results from early Saturday morning onward. Protests were initially mostly peaceful but became increasingly violent. Demonstrators chanted phrases such as "Down with the dictator", "Death to the dictator", and "Give us our votes back". Mousavi urged for calm and asked that his supporters refrain from acts of violence.

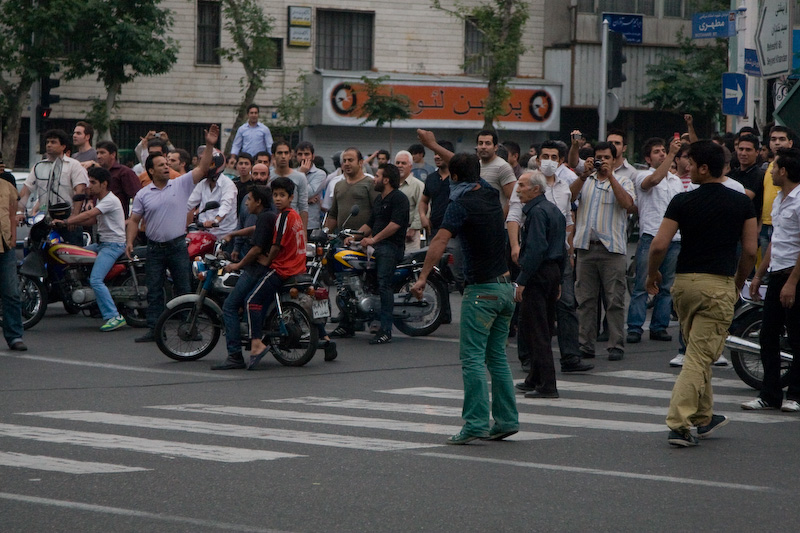
Protesters in Tehran, June 13, 2009

Anonymous sources said that the police stormed the headquarters of the Islamic Iran Participation Front and arrested a number of people.

Two hundred people protested outside Iran's embassy in London. Protests led by Iranian-Americans were also held outside the Iranian representative office in New York City.

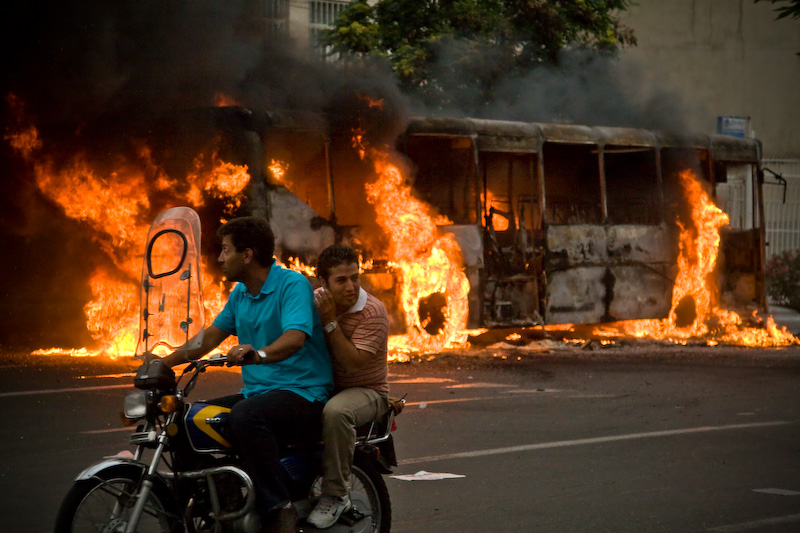
Burning bus during the election protests in Tehran, June 13

On Sunday, protests grew considerably in scope and violence, leading Al Jazeera English to describe the situation as the "biggest unrest since the 1979 revolution". It also reported that protests seemed spontaneous without any formal organization. Buses and trash cans were burned, and parked cars blocked streets and highways in Tehran and routes leading into the city. Protesters attacked shops, government offices, police stations, police vehicles, gas stations and banks. Barricades were installed around all government ministries, embassies (there were reports of shootings outside the Russian Embassy, which supported the election results), Mehrabad and Imam Khomeini International Airport, where there were scenes of large clashes with riot police. Large protests, which escalated into riots, broke out at Tehran University, Amirkabir University, and Shahid Beheshti University. Other protests occurred in Ahwaz, Shiraz, Gorgan, Tabriz, Rasht, Babol, Mashhad, Isfahan, Zahedan, Qazvin, Sari, Karaj, Tabriz, Shahsavar, Orumieh, Bandar Abbas, Arak, and Birjend. In Gorgan, protestors broke into a Basij base and killed several IRGC officials, causing mass purges and attacks in the city. Since riot police are largely limited to Tehran, the IRGC and the Basij were dispatched to quell protests in other cities.

Reporters from the Italian state-owned television broadcaster RAI stated that one of its interpreters was beaten with clubs by riot police and the officers then confiscated the cameraman's tapes. Also several BBC cameramen were beaten and arrested by IRGC officials and had their tapes confiscated.

On the night between the June 14 and 15, 15 students were severely injured by beating or killed when police and basij attacked Tehran University dormitories. 120 faculty members of Sharif University of Technology resigned in protest of the alleged electoral fraud and began a protest against Ahmadinejad's re-election as President.

Protests were organized outside the United Nations in New York City; in front of the Iranian embassies in Paris, Berlin, London, and Iranian consulate in Sydney; and in a public square in Toronto. Protests also occurred in Kuala Lumpur, Los Angeles, San Diego, San Francisco and Dubai. Other protests had been organized in front of the Iranian embassies in Turkey, Paris, Berlin, London, Milan, Rome, Vienna, and The Hague. In addition, a large counter-demonstration celebrating the reelection of Ahmadinejad took place in central Tehran.

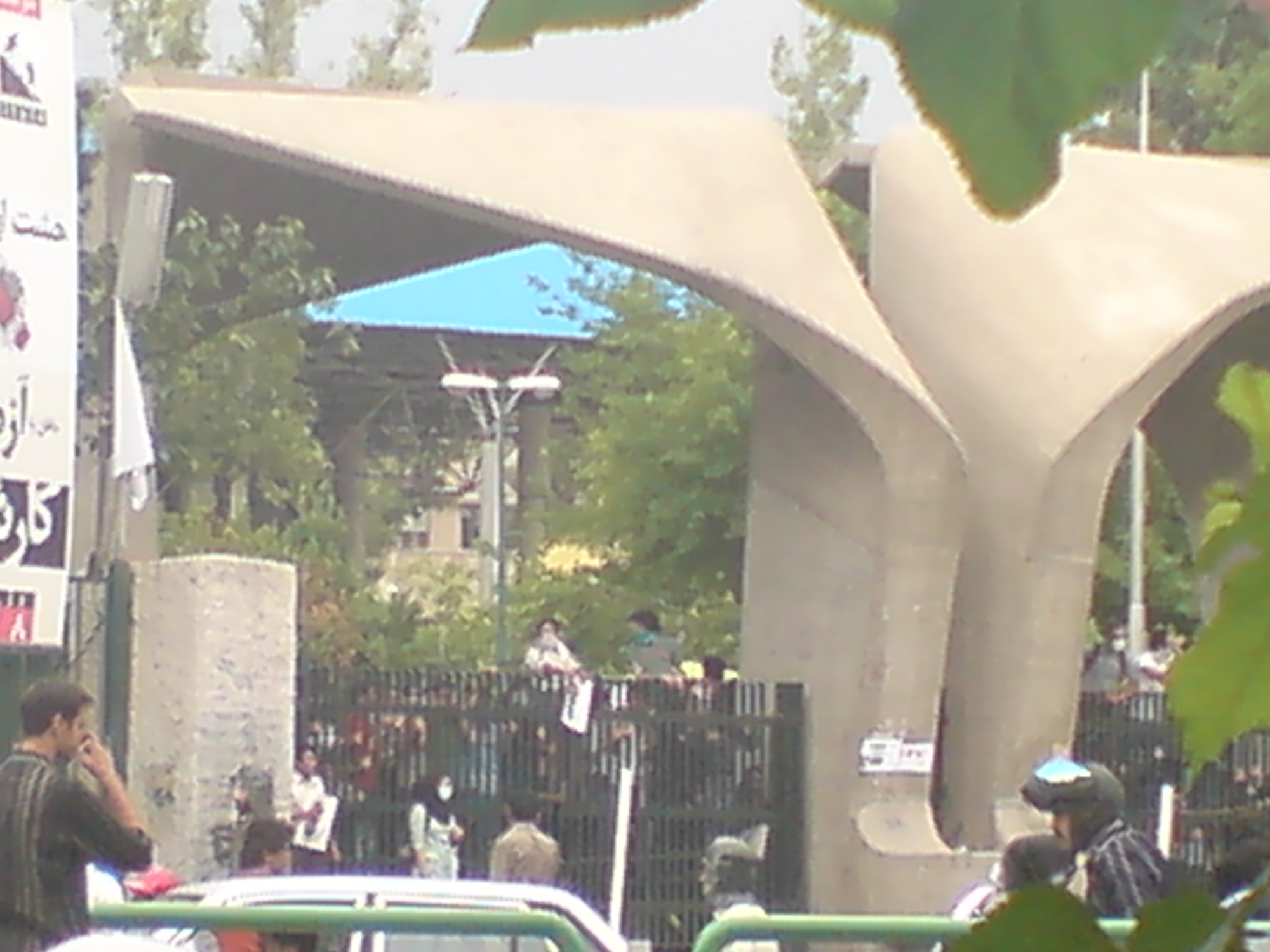
Protests in the Tehran University, 14 June

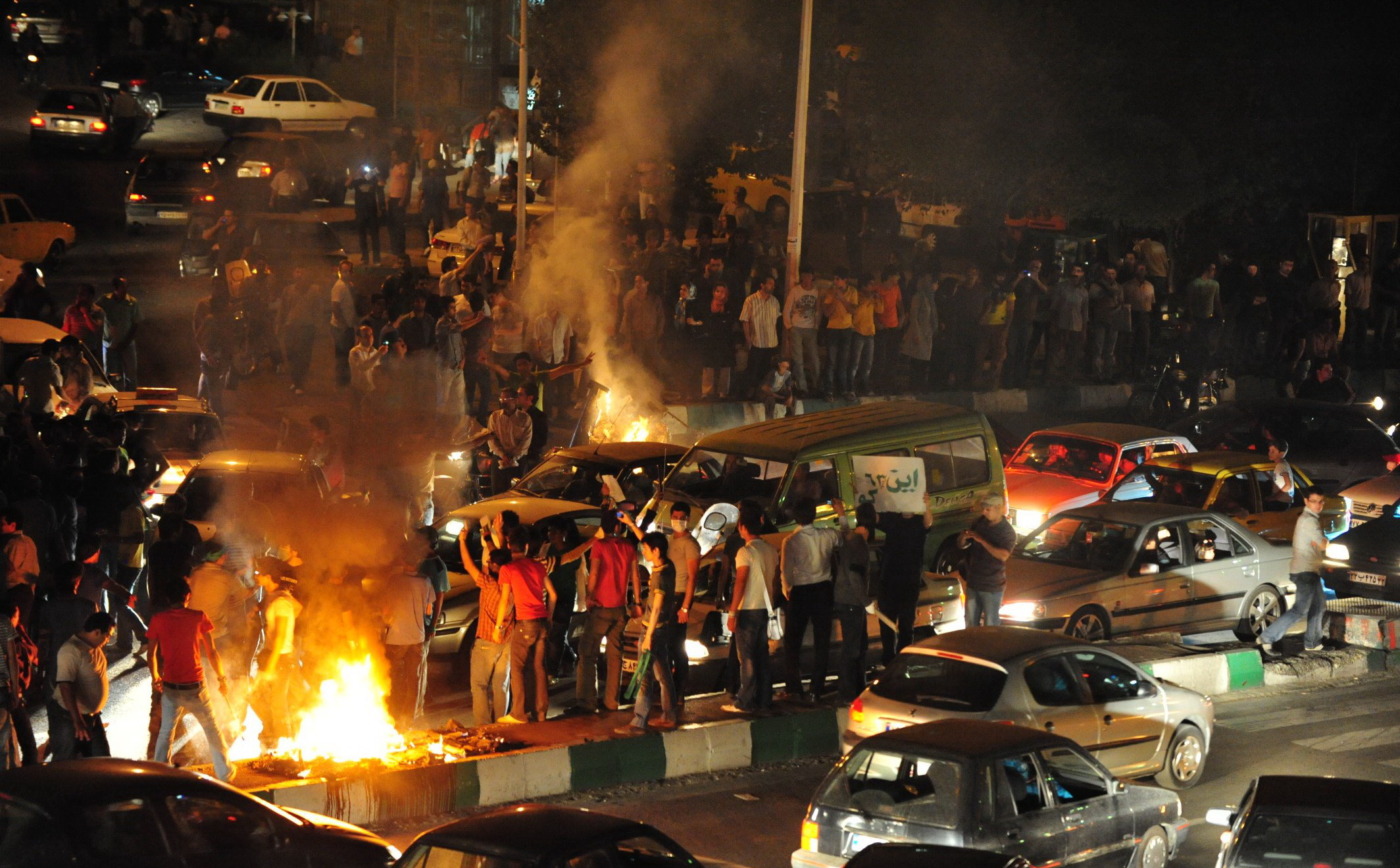
Protests at night in Tehran on June 15

On June 15, Mousavi made his first post-election appearance, before supporters numbered at two million or more, at a rally in Tehran's Freedom Square, despite being warned by state officials that any such rally would be illegal. Shots were fired from a compound used by Basij pro-government militia, apparently killing seven demonstrators, after the crowd allegedly attacked the militia's compound. Iranian authorities arrested one man over the shooting. Besides this incident, the protest appeared peaceful. Several rallies of smaller scale took place in other Iranian cities.

Solidarity protests took place in Montreal at Place des Arts; in Kuala Lumpur, Malaysia, where police fired tear gas to break up a protest at the city's United Nations building; in Chicago; and in Copenhagen.

==== June 16 ====
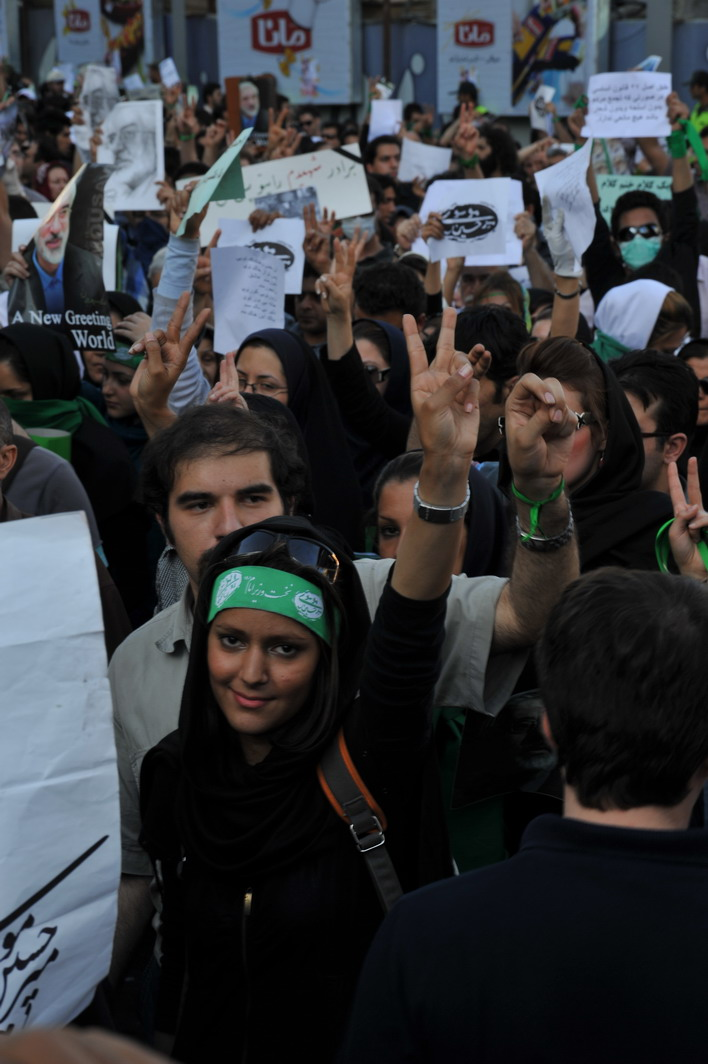
Protesters in Tehran, June 16

Thousands of people massed the streets of Tehran again. A British journalist reported seeing special police keeping Basijs and demonstrators separated. Over 120 Tehran University professors who had resigned in protest of violence against students joined the protests after security forces violently raided university dormitories.

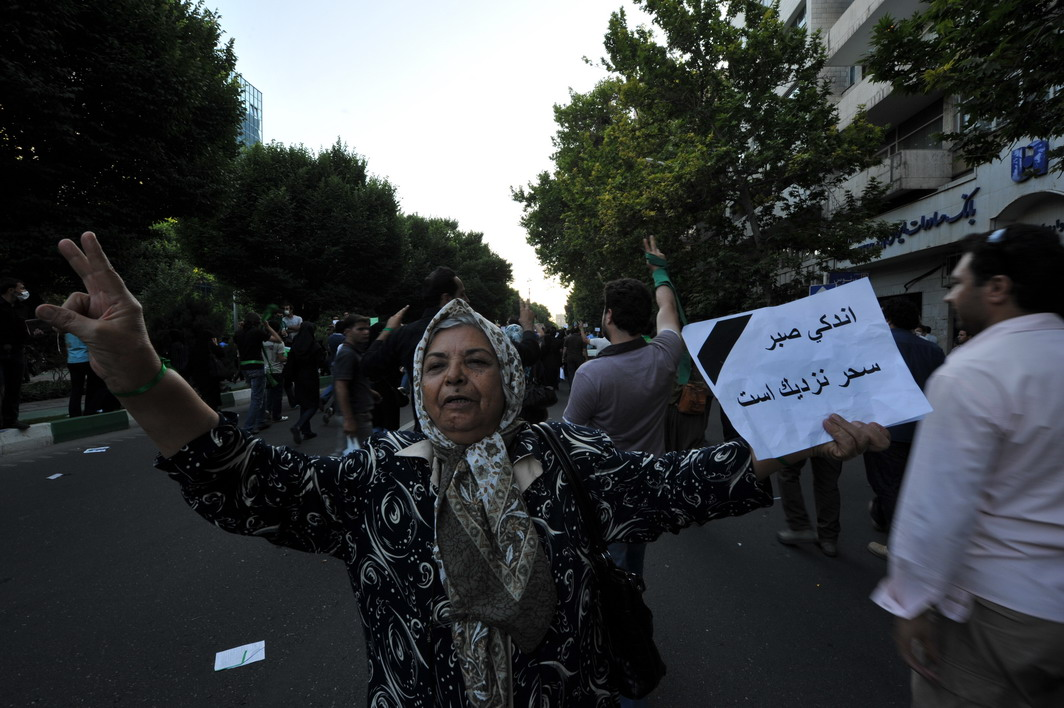
A protester holds a sign reading "Be patient! The morning is coming...", June 16

The Guardian Council announced that it was prepared to order a partial recount, and ruled out an annulment of the vote. The concession was rejected by the main opposition candidate, Mir-Hossein Mousavi, demanding that a new election be held.

==== June 17 ====
The Iranian national football team played against South Korea's team in Seoul on Wednesday, with some members of the Iranian team wearing green armbands in support of Mousavi.

Another demonstration was held in Tehran centering on the 7 Tir Square. Estimates of the number of participants ranged between 70,000 and 500,000.

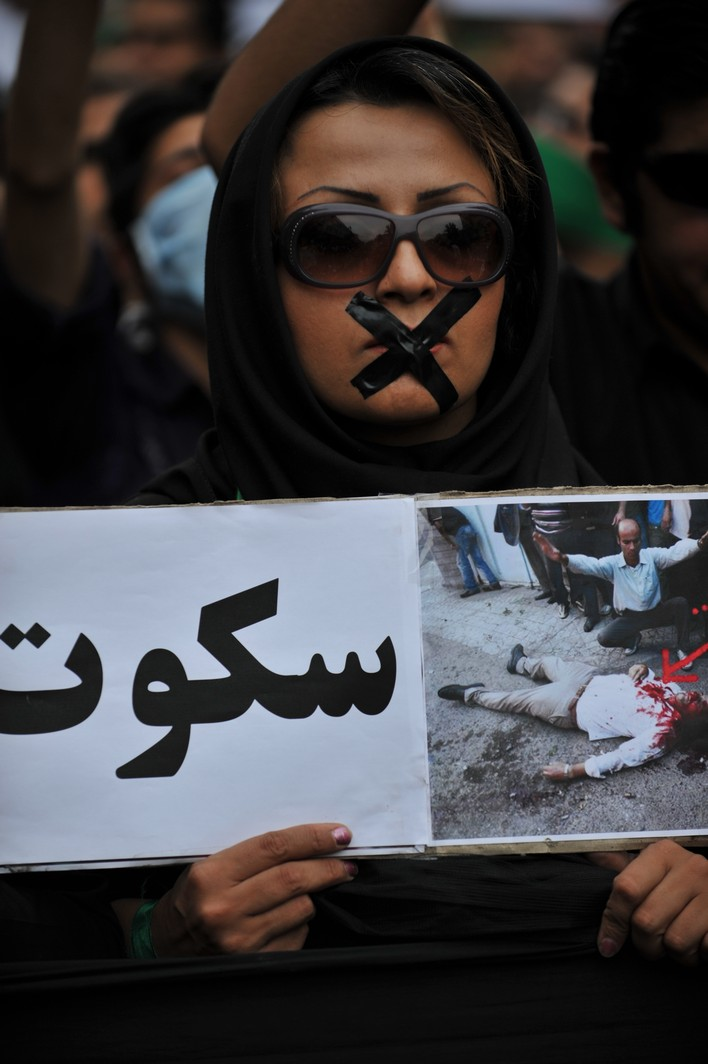
A woman protester with tape covering her mouth, engaging in silent protest while holding a photo of a protester casualty, Tehran, June 17

==== June 18 ====
Candle-bearing protesters massed in central Tehran on Thursday near Toopkhaneh square, following a call by Mousavi to commemorate those who were killed on Monday's protests. Varying reports placed the crowd size between "tens of thousands" and "more than 100,000." A second, simultaneous protest with several hundred participants took place near the UN headquarters, while a counter rally was held by hard line students protesting former President Akbar Hashemi Rafsanjani's role in the pro-Mousavi protests.

The Guardian Council invited the three major challengers to meet to discuss their grievances.

==== June 19 ====
Supreme Leader Ali Khamenei spoke about the previous protests during his scheduled television appearance. He argued that "media belonging to Zionists, evil media," were trying to divide the state and Western powers were casting doubts on the election. He announced that he would not to be willing to give in to "illegal pressures" to change the results, and said that the opposition leaders would be "responsible for bloodshed and chaos" if they did not stop the demonstrations.

Hours after Khamenei's speech, defeated candidate Mehdi Karoubi called for election results to be cancelled."

Mousavi spokesman Mohsen Makhmalbaf said "Mousavi's headquarters was wrecked by plainclothes police officers" with many staffers arrested, and Mousavi himself ordered by the Revolutionary Guard to stay silent. Makhmalbaf said his job was "to urge people to take to the streets because Mousavi could not do so directly".

Both houses of the US Congress condemned violence against demonstrators by the Iranian government.

An underground newspaper entitled خيابان, or "The Street," also printed an issue dated June 19.

==== June 20 ====
State-run television reported that at least 10 were killed and 100 injured on Saturday, as thousands of protesters swept into the streets of Tehran, in open defiance of warnings issued Friday by Iran's Supreme Leader and Security Council. State media said 457 people had been detained over Saturday's violence.. A young Iranian woman, identified as Neda Soltan, was shot by the Basij and died in front of cameras on Kargar Avenue in Tehran. Highly graphic amateur videos of the killing rapidly spread virally across the internet after being posted to Facebook and YouTube. On 20 June – a day after Khamenei had warned of a brutal reaction if unrest continued – the Tehran ambulance service's internal radio system confirmed that at least 47 people had died, many from gunshot wounds. Iranians' green revolution refuses to wither and die

On Saturday night, the Iranian state-run news agency IRINN said an attacker had been killed earlier in the day outside Tehran at the entrance to the mausoleum that holds the body of former Supreme Leader Ayatollah Ruhollah Khomeini. The agency said the man "carrying the bomb" was killed, and there were no other casualties. Press TV was reporting that the bomber was the sole fatality and that three other people were wounded at the shrine to Khomeini. These claims have not been confirmed.

In a statement posted on the website of his Kalemeh newspaper, Mousavi repeated his demand for the elections results to be annulled, and charged that the fraud could destroy the country's republicanism. An ally of Mousavi reported that the opposition leader had told his supporters that he was ready for martyrdom and had called for a general strike. Speaker of the Parliament (Majlis) Ali Larijani declared that a significant number of people believed the official election results to be fraudulent.

State television quoted a council spokesman as saying that the Guardian Council had expressed its readiness to "randomly" recount up to 10 per cent of the ballots.

Worldwide solidarity protests took place in New York City, Los Angeles, at the gates of the White House, outside of Paris and in Brussels. US-based human rights group Human Rights Watch and US President Barack Obama both issued statements urging the Iranian government to end violence against protesters.

==== June 21 ====
Iranian Foreign Minister Manouchehr Mottaki rebuked Britain, France and Germany for raising questions about reports of voting irregularities. Mottaki charged France with taking "treacherous and unjust approaches," and accused Britain of flying intelligence agents into Iran before the election to interfere with the vote. The election, he insisted, was a "very transparent competition." British Foreign Secretary David Miliband categorically denied the charge against his country, adding: "This can only damage Iran's standing in the eyes of the world."

An Iranian official at the Ministry of Culture and Islamic Guidance announced the expulsion of BBC Tehran correspondent Jon Leyne but said the BBC office in Tehran would remain open. The semi-official Fars News Agency, which said Leyne must leave within 24 hours, explained that he was accused of "dispatching fabricated news and reports" and "ignoring neutrality in news," as well as "supporting rioters and trampling the Iranian nation's rights." Furthermore, Iranian officials detained Iranian-born, Canadian citizen and Newsweek journalist Maziar Bahari. Campaign group Reporters Without Borders says 23 local journalists and bloggers have been arrested over the past week.

While the streets have generally been quiet in Tehran, the daughter of Hashemi Rafsanjani and four other relatives have reportedly been jailed. Security forces have labelled protesters as "terrorists" and demonstrators condemned the harsh tactics of government-backed militias. Officials have reiterated that they are prepared to use force against protesters. Reuters reported that Iran Police Chief Ismail Ahmadi Moghaddam told opposition leader Mousavi that "bandits are acting in the shadow of the illegal atmosphere created by you."

==== June 22 ====
The Guardian Council, the body in charge of supervising and certifying the elections in Iran, declared the incumbent President Ahmadinejad the winner after dismissing the vote challenges, according to a front-page report on CNN.com. The report said that Press TV, an Iranian state-owned television network in the nation announced the decision via a spokesperson for the group. They said that while they agreed that in up to 50 cities votes were higher than those eligible to vote, but that it was not enough to result in anything beyond further investigations.

Speaking at a news conference on Monday, foreign ministry spokesman Hassan Qashqavi accused Western governments of explicitly backing violent protests aimed at undermining the stability of Iran's Islamic Republic. He said the West was acting in an "anti-democratic" manner, instead of praising Iran's commitment to democracy and stressing once again that the results of the presidential election were unimpeachable. Iran has strongly criticised the US and UK governments in recent days, and Mr Qashqavi reserved special scorn for the BBC and for the Voice of America network, which he called "government channels". He spoke as Tehran remained tense but quiet amid heavy security aimed at preventing new protests against the result of Iran's presidential election. Mr Mousavi has told his supporters, who have taken to the streets in their tens of thousands for more than a week, to continue their protests but not to put their lives in danger.

The Guardian's live blog reported that at approximately 1:30 pm, General Ali Fazli, the newly appointed commander of the Revolutionary Guards in Tehran province, has been arrested for refusing to carry Khamenei's order to use force against demonstrators.

At 4:30 pm Tehran time, Iran's ambassador to London was summoned to the Foreign Office and told that Khamenei's remarks were unacceptable. British Prime Minister Gordon Brown later condemned the "repression" and "brutality" used against the protesters. At approximately the same time the British Embassy in Tehran announced they were evacuating the families of embassy staff members and issued a travel advisory against visiting Iran. The Foreign Office noted that "further violence is possible," but said it did not believe it was necessary for British nationals already in Iran to leave the country.

According to the BBC, 1,000 protesters gathered at Haft-e Tir Square in defiance of a warning by the Revolutionary Guard that they would crack down hard on additional protests. Riot police fired tear gas to disperse the crowd.

==== June 23 ====
According to social networking sites such as Twitter and online newspapers such as The Huffington Post, many Iranians have avoided the streets in fear of combat with the Basij. Unconfirmed reports of moderate-sized gatherings were later proven by photography and video.

U.S. President Obama condemned the use of violence in Iran and made a reference to Neda who was shot to death during a rally in Tehran by an unknown Basij sniper. It was also reported by the Iranian-government funded news service Press TV that Mahmoud Ahmadinejad would be sworn in by the Parliament of Iran either in late July or early August.

Iranians continued to gather in groups of several hundred, while Basij militants used tear gas to disperse protesters. The Iranian government stated that it would expel British diplomats for "unconventional behaviour."

The Guardian reported that at least four Iranian players from the national soccer team who wore green armbands during the fourth round World Cup qualifying match in Seoul received "life bans". The New York Times later reported that FIFA had asked the players to remove the armbands at halftime because the governing body prohibits any expressions that can be interpreted as political. Afshin Ghotbi, the coach of the team at the time, stated "The stories on the players are false and rumors, The [Iranian Football Federation] has not taken any official stand on this issue. We only saw the story in the international media." Furthermore, the claim that they soccer players wore wristbands "in support of Mousavi" was manufactured by the Western media, without recognizing that green was part of the official uniform of the team (as well as the flag) and the same players also had green shirt collars and green designs on their shirt and socks, as evident in the photographs of the players.

The people of Kurdistan province started a protest against the treatment of protesters in Tehran, with its starting point in the city of Saqqez. Protests consisted of rallies and business strikes in this area.

==== June 24 ====
Former Iranian President Mohammad Khatami reportedly made a call for peaceful mass stand-ins in bazaars across Iran, with the aim of disrupting commerce while avoiding the violent police crackdowns which have accompanied the more overt protests and riots.

A caller into the CNN newsroom who is a female Iranian citizen claimed that in Baharestan Square, Basij forces shot bullets into the crowd. She also claimed that students and old men alike were being beaten by these guards. In addition, it was believed that these Basij guards did not speak Persian because they did not understand nor did they respond to the cries from the protesters. She reported that these Basij militia-men came out of a local mosque by the hundreds to violently attack protesters.

On this day numerous violent confrontations with the Basij were reported. It seems as if the violence has started again in Tehran, but again, as of this date, these reports are confirmed with a few photos and videos.

There were also reports of protesters at the Iranian Parliament building coming under sniper fire from Basiji. While Wednesday's protests were relatively small in terms of the numbers of people involved, they are said to have been some of the bloodiest during the unrest. Iranian dissidents claim the day's violence raised the death toll to 249 in the last ten days.

In what has been interpreted as a sign of divisions within the Iranian government, it was reported that 185 of the 290 Iranian Members of Parliament invited to attend Ahmadinejad's Wednesday night victory celebration rejected their invitations.

==== June 25 ====
Mirhossein Mousavi remained defiant, denouncing the election as an "evil conspiracy," and refusing to "withdraw [his protests] for even one moment."

Compared to the earlier violence, June 25 was the calmest day that Tehran had seen in nearly two weeks. A source for The Guardian reported that this was likely due, at least in part, to the national university entrance exams being conducted on that day, in which 1.5 million young Iranians participated.

Another opposition candidate, Mahdi Karroubi, postponed a vigil of mourning for the victims scheduled for June 25, pushing the date back at least a week. According to Karroubi's website, the memorial service was delayed because the authorities had not granted the organizers permission to hold the rally.

Despite the relative quiet, there were still a few incidents. A group of mourners attempted to visit the grave of Neda Agha Soltan, but were turned away by riot police. Those who refused the order to disperse or were seen carrying green signs were arrested. Clashes were also reported in and around Enghelab square, a site of previous violence. Protesters were said to have come from two sides and tried to drive the police from the square. Youths reportedly threw stones at blockades and set a bus on fire, and gunfire was reported in the area.

The day also saw the releases of a number of prominent Iranians who had been arrested for their part in the opposition. According to Human Rights Watch, sixty-six of the seventy Iranian professors arrested the previous night were released from jail. Also freed were Alireza Beheshti, editor-in-chief of the pro-Mousavi newspaper Kalameh, and a photographer from the citizen journalist organization Demotix.

==== June 26 ====
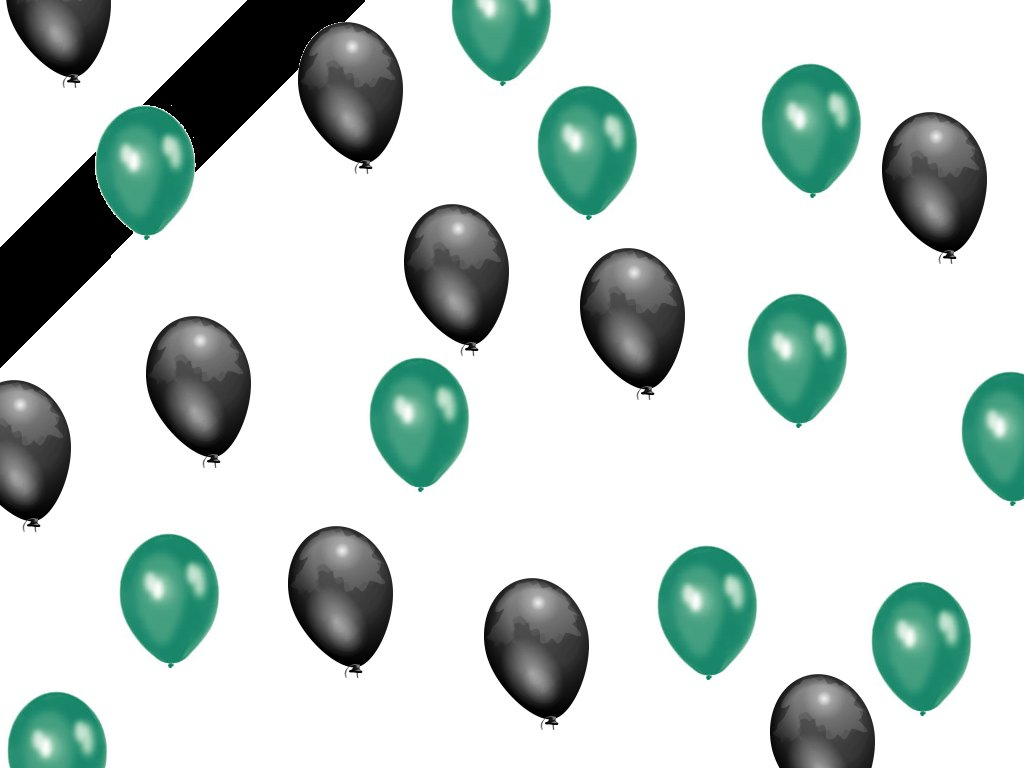
People all over the world released green balloons into the sky on June 26, 2009

On 26 June about 150 people gathered outside the Iranian embassy in Stockholm, Sweden, to protest against the Islamic republic regime. Some of the protesters managed to enter the embassy building, where they engaged in fighting with the embassy's personnel. According to the police, one member of the embassy staff was injured in the clashes. In addition, a few of the protesters were injured according to the organizers. The police later managed to evict the demonstrators from the building and arrested one person.

Ayatollah Ahmed Khatami, a senior cleric of the Islamic republic called for pro-democracy protest leaders to be punished "without mercy" including execution for some. Khatami stated that "anyone who takes up arms to fight with the people, they are worthy of execution," and "those who disturbed the peace and destroyed public property were 'at war with God'" and "should be 'dealt with without mercy'".

People across the world released green balloons in what would be called "Balloon Day" in support of the protesters.

Mousavi instructed via his Facebook page:

"Ok, now all the world are going to show their supports to Iranians... This Friday, We all are going to send GREEN BALLOONS to the sky to show that now ALL PEOPLE OF THE WORLD ARE IRANIAN. On 9/11 everybody was American, NOW THE WORLD IS IRANIAN."

==== June 27 ====
According to Human Rights Watch, Basijis carried out nighttime raids, destroying property and beating citizens, in attempts to stop the rooftop protest calls of "Allahu akbar."

At Tehran University, students held a small, candlelight vigil in memory of those killed in the two weeks of unrest. The vigil apparently was peaceful and proceeded without incident.

There were mourning at the Behesht-e Zahra Cemetery at Neda Agha-Soltan's grave site.

==== June 28 ====
Responding to Mir Hossein Mousavi's appeal, Iranian government legally approved a Sunday, June 28, 2009, (or Tir 7th 1388 Anno Persico) peaceful prayer gathering at 6 pm mourning those killed during the 2009 post-election clashes at the Qoba Mosque on Ghoba Alley (North of Hosseinie Ershad Mosque on Doktor Ali-ye Shariati) in Tehran. Diplomats from Muslim and Arab countries may attend. The government promised not to hurt the peaceful mourners present.

Snipers and intelligence officers are seen on the roofs near Ghoba, a unit of Anti-Riot Police warned people to leave, military helicopters hovering in the sky.

Thousands of people are gathered around the Ghoba-Shariati neighbourhood.

An estimated 5,000 protesters marched slowly and silently through Tehran Sunday. The government was reportedly allowing demonstrations.

The large crowd shouted "Ya Hussein" in a YouTube footage. A YouTube footage shows that Mehdi Karroubi entered the crowd at the Ghoba Mosque. One witness reported at 8:30 pm that Mohammad Khatami and Mir Hossein Mousavi are reportedly seen earlier at the Mosque. However, another witness said that Alireza Beheshti, son of Mohammad Beheshti told the crowd that Mousavi was prevented from coming. Faezeh Hashemi was seen with people that ringed around the banner outside of the Mosque door. The slogans were: "Salam bar Beheshti, Dorood bar Mousavi." Mostafa Malekian stood in the Ghoba alley with the crowd and sported victory signs. Reza Attaran also joined the crowd, wearing a green T-shirt. Also attending the gathering was Hojjat al-Islam Hadi Ghaffari.

Because the Shariati Street entrance of Ghoba Alley and the other end were both blocked by barriers, about 2000 mourners packed in the alley, under the surveillance of sharpshooters and heavy police presence, especially those fully deployed along Shariati Street. A witness reported that police used tear gas to disperse the people at the northern end of the Ghoba Alley.

There are Facebook posters who claimed to have attended the Ghoba gathering who disputed that there were serious clashes, claiming that the exit towards the United Nations office (which is at the northern end of Ghoba Alley) was peaceful and free of tear-gassing or clashes. This claim, along with those of serious clashes, cannot be verified.

All YouTube postings that shows Ghoba setting are peaceful so far, including one with the crowd surrounding Alireza Beheshti, who spoke via a loudspeaker, and was watched by a police officer behind. Beheshti conveyed to the crowd a message delivered by Mousavi over the phone. On the same day, there are new YouTube postings of some street (allegedly on Shariati Street leading to Ghoba Alley) marches with "Marg bar diktator" (death to dictator) shouted in unison, and some with smouldering objects and gunshots dispersing rioters. But these were clearly not shot at the narrow alley of Ghoba, and not necessarily on Sunday the 28th. The safety in the surrounding of a historical mosque, coinciding with an important memorial date in the Islamic Republic seem to have given police forces and the protesters such an uneasy moment of truce and standstill. This matches the pattern throughout centuries of Islamic history in which religiously-sanctioned gatherings became moments of freedom of political expression, and in which political dissents became symbiotic with a community held together by common interpretation of faith, which secular authorities had difficulties in outlawing. This has led to some witnesses to urge the Muslims among the Greens to pray silently in large numbers at mosques during prayer hours, especially on Fridays, as a silent protest against the government's prohibition on any gathering.

Despite this, the government's arrest of 8 British embassy employees (with 4 later released) is another indicator of its readiness to intimidate the international community. Khamenei has issued a statement warning "both sides" not to provoke each other, hinting that further wanton police brutality is perceived by the Supreme Leader, if not by Ahmadinejad's faction, to be costly for the regime's shaky rule.

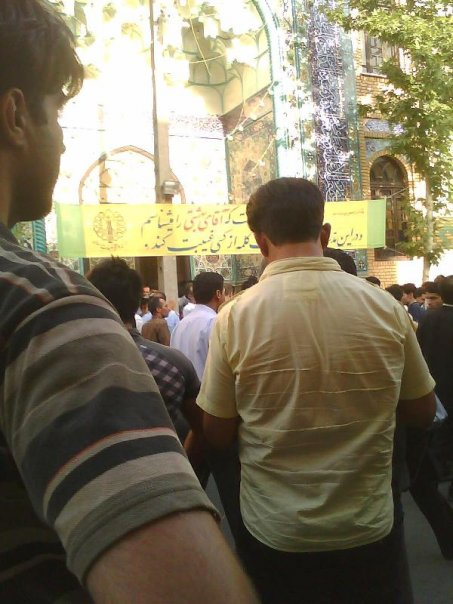

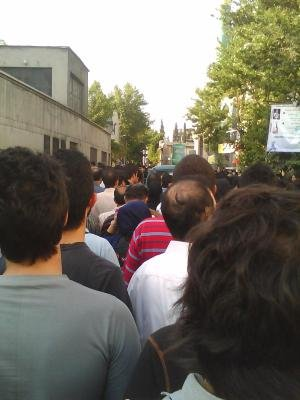

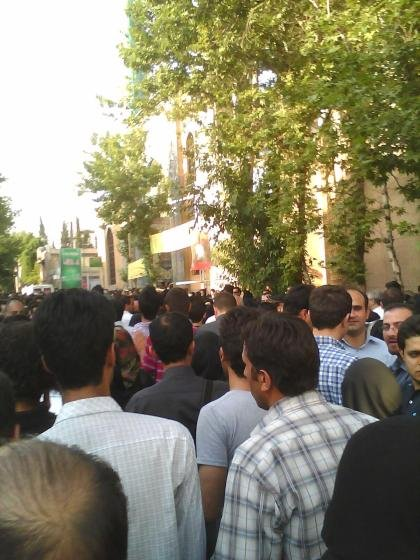

The Sunday June 28 large gathering outside the Qoba Mosque in Tehran. And YouTube footage of the gathering outside Ghoba:

As early as Tehran time 7 pm, most English mainstream media, including Washington Times and Al Jazeera, reported "police clashing with 3000 protesters around Ghoba", but cited the lack of verifiable accounts from Tehran due to government press control. Injuries were reported, among them an elderly woman who was allegedly beaten by police. Her beating reportedly enraged nearby protestors, who attacked the police in turn.

A Sunday June 28 YouTube posting shows a riot raging in a northern Tehran neighborhood with the Alborz Mountain in the backdrop, which was on an unconfirmed date around sunset. The entire neighborhood was shrouded in smoke. Flame was visible on a street nearby. And the video camera, viewing from a tall building, could record a uniformed armed policeman randomly shooting into the streets.

However, by midnight Tehran time, CNN described the Ghoba protest as "silent", with peaceful end.

==== June 29 ====
In Paris, thousands of demonstrators took to the streets in a show of solidarity with the Iranians.

Meanwhile, Egyptian security forces shut down a scheduled solidarity march through the streets of Cairo, planned in honor of Neda Agha Soltan. Egyptian dissidents accused their government of hypocrisy, for having denounced the Iranian regime's repressive actions only days before banning the march.

On the floor of the Iranian Parliament, a physical confrontation broke out between MP Pezeshkian, who had urged the regime to show restraint, and hard-line MPs.

Signs of unrest continued today. Motorists in Tehran beeped their horns to signal their support for Mousavi, prompting basiji patrols to slash tires and break windshields. Meanwhile, in response to rumors of a human chain being formed, Tehran police massed at Valieasr Street to stop demonstrators from assembling. On this night, the rooftop chants of "Allahu akbar" continued.

The Guardian Council reaffirmed Ahmadinejad's victory after recounting 10% of the votes. Upon the announcement of this news, protesters once again took to the streets of Tehran, and clashes were reported in the city. Although the police cleared the streets relatively quickly, citizens throughout the capital resumed the shouting of revolutionary slogans from the rooftops.

==== June 30 ====
It is reported that dissidents in Tehran, in response to the closing of newspapers, have started writing anti-government graffiti on walls throughout the city.

A crowd of over 2,000 people gathered at a courthouse in Uromieh seeking information about jailed relatives. No protest activity or violence was reported at this gathering.

Many expatriates from Muslim countries expressed that they wish to visit the Behesht-e Zahra Cemetery in peace, or at least as close to the site of Neda Agha-Soltan's first burial site as possible on Saturday-Sunday, July 4–5, the 2-week anniversary of her death, since the martyred woman wasn't given a proper Muslim funeral.

On the date of Ghoba, although some expatriates expressed that they would like to attend the Mosque gathering to show faith to Allah, the Ahmadinejad regime arrested 9 British diplomats as soon as they caught wind that certain Iranian-born British diplomats might be attending. Now most of the British diplomats were released under international pressure.

Recently, because Ahmadinejad has openly insulted the Prophet's two Sahaba, he has drawn much anger from the Ikhwan al-Muslimin in Egypt, and much contempt from even Hosni Mubarak. Mubarak pointed out, he or the King of Saudi Arabia would never insult the Shia faith in such a manner.

=== July ===
==== July 2 ====
Thursday, July 2, thousands of relatives of dead protesters marched towards the Behesht-e Zahra cemetery, where mass graves were set aside for the dead, and where Neda Agha-Soltan is buried. These mourners were reportedly frustrated by the police.

==== July 4 ====
Thousands mourn Neda Agha-Soltan at Behesht Cemetery, Tehran. Her grave was strewn with rose petals, and adorned with the slogan "We Are Neda". New YouTube video surfaced on July 3 of the moment before Neda was shot. Video was filmed on roof top. Even though Khosravi Street was not directly filled with violence, it was certainly not far from the view of bike-riding Basijis. The shot that killed her was not the only shot heard in the video, though the last. It was apparent that the black-veiled woman (apparently Neda) accompanied by the blue-shirted old man (apparently Panahi), was shot by the bike-riding Basijis shooting at the "Marg bar diktator!" shouters, who were not close, but fully within view of the walking woman. This observation is in sharp contrast to the Iranian government's explanation that Neda's shooting was carefully set up by Arash Hejazi. If Neda's death was so carefully set up, the dozens of other violent deaths in Tehran in these few weeks can also be likewise explained, while the police and Basijis were the only people evidently armed with fire weapons, and were caught on films smashing private properties without provocation. It is also contrary to the account that the site of her shooting is entirely out of the range of rioting streets. What this video can not show, is whether there was any armed bike-riders going out of their way from the rioting street behind, to attack the woman at close range.

The Assembly of Teachers and Scientists at the Qom School for Shiite Clerics declared the 2009 election in which Ahmadinejad won "illegitimate".

==== July 8 ====
Prominent Iranian lawyer Mohammad Ali Dadkhah was reportedly arrested, along with a number of others, in Tehran on 8 July 2009. He is said to have provided legal representation for some of the hundreds of people arrested following the June 2009 election.

==== July 9 ====
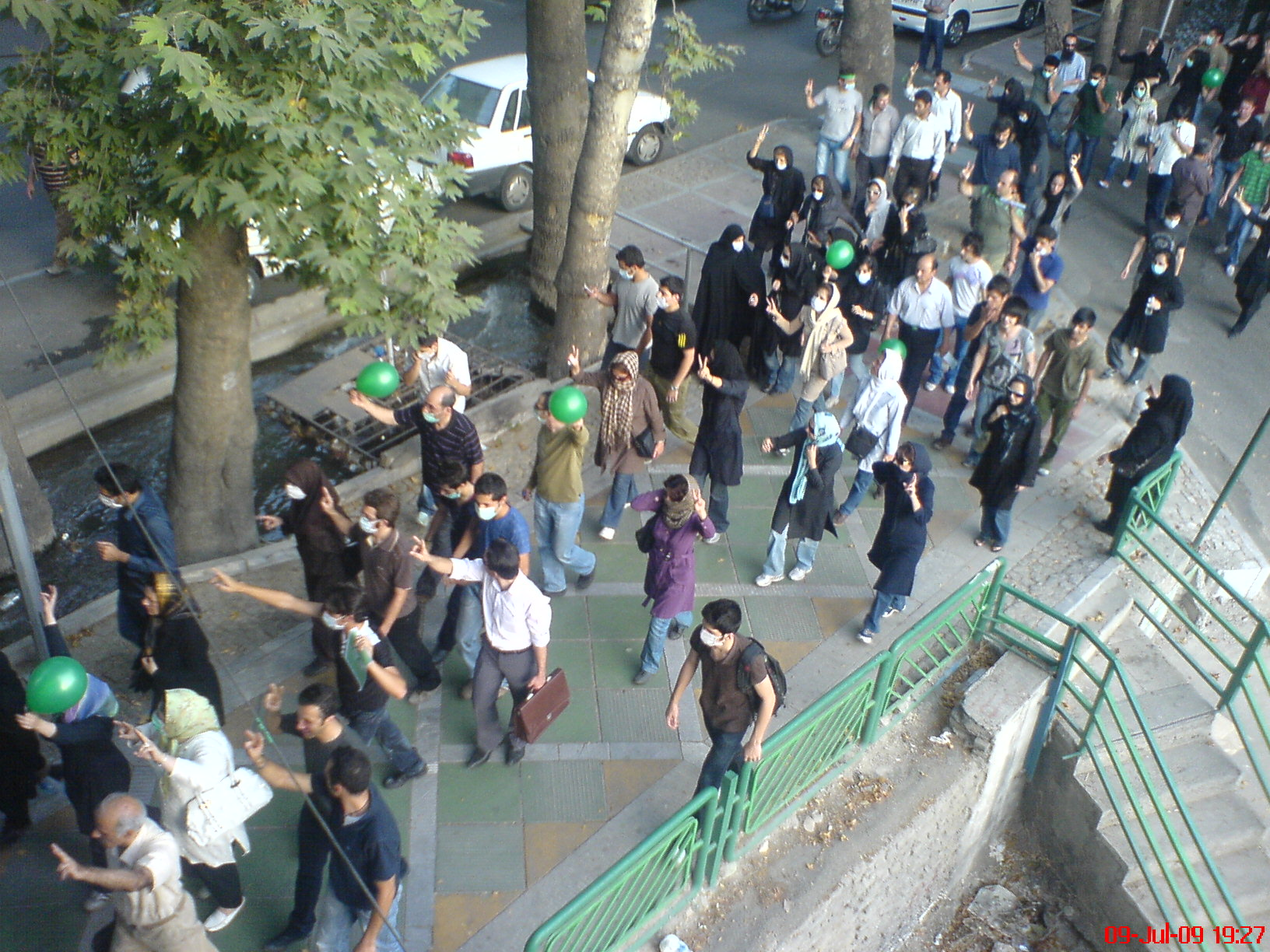
Demonstrations on the anniversary of 1999 student protests, July 09

This date, being an anniversary of 18 Tir Massacre, had been predicted to be a day of massive protests in Tehran. Indeed, protests broke out, with about 700 people chanting "Death to dictator!" in front of Tehran University. Other protest, by about 200 people took place at Vali-e Asr Street. Both protests were dispersed by police using batons and tear gas, however protesters managed to regroup in other places again.

Security operations against protests are difficult, as vast areas of Iranian territory were covered with dust storms, including Tehran, where many offices and schools had to be closed.

"The demonstrators made a moral point. They told the government in no uncertain terms they are still there and not going away," said an Iranian analyst who witnessed the protests.

==== July 12 ====
Judicial System of Iran handed the body of Sohrab Aarabi to his family. Aarabi, a pro democracy student disappeared nearly a month ago after attending a demonstration in Tehran. His death generated nationwide anger.

==== July 14 ====
Ex-prime minister Mousavi visited Sohrab Aarabi's home and showed solidarity with his relatives.

==== July 17 ====
Nearly two million people demonstrated in the streets of Tehran and joined the Friday Prayer sermon of Mr Hashemi Rafsanjani. Leading reformist leaders Mir Hossein Mousavi and Mehdi Karroubi also took part in the gatherings as announced before. Police used tear gas against the crowd. At least 15 people have been arrested by the police. Among the arrested protestors were Shadi Sadr, a prominent Iranian women rights activist and writer. Deutsche Welle described it as the most critical and turbulent Friday prayer in the history of contemporary Iran.

Mehdi Karroubi and Abdollah Nouri were attacked and beaten by men in plain-clothes on his way to Friday prayers at Tehran university. A day before, Sajjad Saffar Harandi, the son of ministry of culture of Iran, wrote in his weblog that Mousavi, Karroubi and Khatami will be beaten if they attend the Friday prayers.

In his speech, former president Hashemi Rafsanjani said: "Doubt has been created [about the election results]," he said. "There is a large portion of the wise people who say they have doubts. We need to take action to remove this doubt."

==== July 18 ====
Hard-line cleric Mohammad Yazdi harshly criticized July 17 Friday sermon and stated the legitimacy of leadership in Iran does not come from the nation, rather it comes from God. Such statements has previously theorized by Mohammad Taghi Mesbah Yazdi and his circle.

Several Persian-language news websites reported that, the Iranian army has arrested 36 officers who planned to attend the Friday prayer sermon by former president Hashemi Rafsanjani in their military uniforms as an act of political defiance.

On July 18, the deputy of the social and cultural affairs of the Ministry of Interior quoted Mahmoud Ahmadinejad, as "demanding the setting up of legal circumstances for making the prison environment more difficult for professional offenders and hooligans and thugs." He stressed that, "Preparations for creating such an atmosphere must be carried out by the Prisons Organization" (Sarmayeh daily, July 19, 2009).

==== July 19 ====
Thousands of people demonstrated in Shiraz. The event was organized by Mousavi and Karrobi's supporters. In Tehran former president Khatami said that a referendum is the only solution to the crisis. The referendum must be conducted by Expediency Discernment Council of Iran.

==== July 21 ====
Clashes erupted in the afternoon in Tehran between anti-government protesters seeking to mark a nationalist Iranian anniversary (the beginning of day of Mohammad Mosaddegh's prime ministership) and hordes of baton-wielding plainclothes Basiji militiamen and government security officers filling a central square. Several prominent members of Iran National Front including Dr. Hossein Mojtahedi were arrested by the security forces in 7 Tir square in Tehran.

In a new form of protest, activists were urged to turn on lights and domestic appliances that consume large amounts of electricity, such as irons, toasters and microwave ovens at 2055 (1625 GMT) and then back on five minutes later. The resulting surge in demand could possibly cause a power outage and cloak Tehran in darkness, allowing some the chance to protest on the streets.

==== July 22–24 ====
A three-day-long hunger strike was organized and followed by people in several parts of the world.

==== July 25 ====
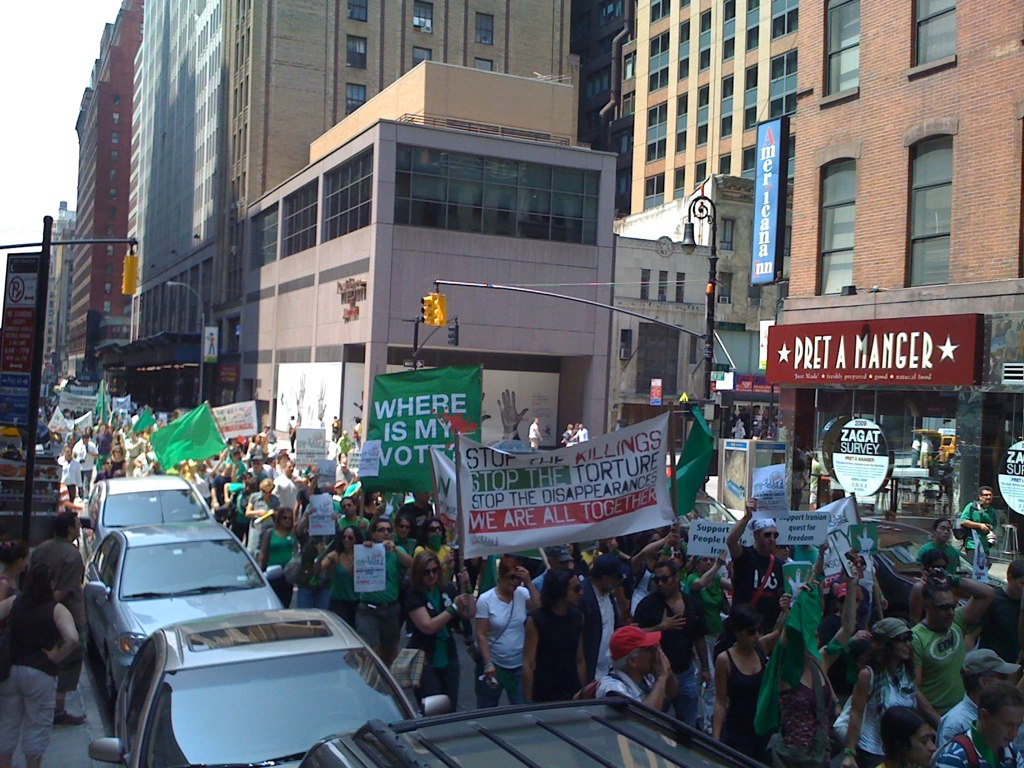
Green Movement Protesters in New York City, 25 July 2009

One of the largest protests held outside Iran was organized by United For Iran and held in over 100 cities all over the world.

Mousavi, former president Mohammad Khatami, and 67 other reformists wrote and were signatories of an open letter sent to Iran's top clerics saying police have held protesters without charges and that "they have resorted to illegal, immoral and un-Islamic methods to obtain confessions."

==== July 26 ====
Mir Hossein Mousavi and Mahdi Karroubi sent a request to the Iranian Interior Ministry to hold a memorial service in Tehran to commemorate the end of the 40-day mourning cycle on 30 July for the people who died on 20 June during the protests, including Neda Agha Soltan.

A video was brought out of Iran showing many protestors rallied outside of the Russian Embassy and started chanting "Death to Russia" after hearing reports that Russia welcomed Ahmadinejad's victory and was reportedly assisting Riot Police and the IRGC. Several other protests were held outside of embassies of countries that welcomed the results.

==== July 27–28 ====
A spokesman for Ayatollah Mahmoud Hashemi Shahrudi condones the arrests of the people during the protests. Mir Mousavi argues back later about the situational comments. The next day, 140 of the protesters during the elections are released from Evin Prison.

==== July 29 ====
The Iranian government announced that first set of trials for the detained opposition supporters will begin 1 August. The trials would start with the prosecution of around 20 protesters.

==== July 30 ====
Iranian people held peaceful demonstrations all over the country. Hundreds of thousands of people mourn the martyrs of Iranian civil rights movement in cities like Ahvaz, Isfahan, Shiraz, Rasht and Tehran.

July 30 morning 2 am, Mir Hossein Mousavi's aides sent out invitation for supporters to participate in the July 30th (Thursday Mordad 8th, 1388 Anno Persico) commemoration of the casualties of the protests, namely Neda Agha-Soltan. This day represented the end of 40th-day mourning cycle. The message asks supporters to attend peaceful and solemn ceremony at the Mosallah Mosque of Tehran, the largest mosque in the city, located in the Abbas Abad district. Before the 6 pm prayer, main activities took place at 4 pm at the burial sites of the martyrs, namely the Behesht-e Zahra Cemeteries, which Mousavi and Mehdi Karrubi were set to attend. After the service at the mosque, the leaders paid visits to and show solidarity with some families who have lost their members in the violence. This message also ties into Mousavi's earlier message that "religious celebrations are opportunities for the display of the 'Green' movement's creativity."

After arriving to Behesht-e Zahra cemetery, Mousavi was forced by police to go back to his car and leave the site. Basij units were dispatched to halt demonstrations and disperse the crowd. Police forces reportedly used tear-gas against the mourners. Some arrests have been reported by eyewitnesses.

Opposition supporter Mehdi Karroubi attempted to give a speech at the cemetery, but was reported to have been forced to flee the site. Reports also say that several of his aides were beaten and harassed.

Renowned film director Jafar Panahi and his wife and daughter were arrested at the cemetery.

Ali Reza Tavasoli, a 12-year-old, was clubbed to death by the Basij after he became separated from his father on the ground of Behesht-e Zahra on Mordad 8th. Someone allegedly captured the death on video. The video is available on YouTube here.

==== July 31 ====
Mehdi Karroubi wrote a letter to Akbar Hashemi Rafsanjani concerning sexual abuse and torture of political activists by Iranian police and Judiciary system.

=== August ===
==== August 1 ====
See main: 2009 Iran poll protests trial

The beginning of a series of trials was held. It started with twenty people who were arrested in the protests and would later expand to over one hundred and included prominent reformists, intellectuals and academics. These trials would be protested and condemned by people throughout the world.

==== August 3 ====
Iran's supreme leader, Ayatollah Ali Khamenei, formally endorsed Mahmoud Ahmadinejad for a second term as president in an official ceremony held to set the stage for the upcoming inauguration on the 5th of August. Mir Hossein Mousavi, Mahdi Karroubi, Akbar Hashemi Rafsanjani and Mohammad Khatami boycotted the ceremony.

==== August 4 ====
Reformist Web sites and blogs called for peaceful protests to be held on 5 August during the inauguration of Ahmadinejad.

==== August 5 ====
Mahmoud Ahmadinejad was inaugurated for his second term as president of Iran in an official inauguration ceremony in Tehran. Protests were held outside the Parliament during the inauguration. Protesters marched around Vannak Square and Valiasr Street chanting "Death to the Dictator". Protesters were broken up by security forces with batons and pepper spray, according to witnesses. Opposition leaders, former presidents Akbar Hashemi Rafsanjani and Mohammad Khatami, all of Ahmadinejad's election challengers, Mousavi, Mahdi Karroubi and Mohsen Rezaei and some prominent lawmakers all boycotted the inauguration.

==== August 12 ====
Following Mehdi Karroubi's letter concerning sexual abuse and torture of civilians in Iranian prisons, Ali Larijani, chairman of Iranian parliament dismissed the allegation as 'sheer lies', saying that a 'precise and comprehensive' inquiry found no cases of sexual abuse.

==== August 8 ====
The protest trials resumed. Family members of the defendants and other protesters gathered in front of the court to protest the trials. Riot police attacked the protesters outside the court and detained reformist lawmaker Ali Tajernia's wife.

==== August 17 ====
Following the banning of Mehdi Karoubi's newspaper for publishing Karroubi's answer to Friday prayer clerics and some issues regarding the death of Taraneh Mousavi, protesters gathered near the newspaper office in Tehran. Witnesses say police dispersed dozens of opposition supporters who shouted anti-government slogans outside the office of the Etemad Melli (National Trust) newspaper. Some demonstrators were reportedly arrested.

==== August 21 ====
After the Esteghlal Foolad F.C. football (soccer) game, some protests broke out.

==== August 22 ====
It was reported that protests were organized near Evin Prison. Workers in Behesht-e Zahra municipal cemetery in Tehran secretly buried 44 bodies from July 12 to 15 in Plot 302.

==== August 26 ====
Supreme Leader Ayatollah Ali Khamenei says he does not believe that groups protesting the presidential election results had foreign backing.

==== August 29 ====
Shajarian's new album Rendan-e Mast (Drunken Libertines) was received warmly by Iranian mass and youth and thousands of its copies was sold in the first day of its release. He was a major supporter of the green movement.

=== September ===
==== September 2 ====
Sadeq Larijani appointed Saeed Mortazavi to the post of deputy prosecutor general of Iran. Mortazavi was prosecutor general of Tehran for more than seven years during which he was involved in murdering and torturing a number of Iranian civilians and activists including those who were arrested during post election unrests.

==== September 4 ====
Detailed information of 72 victims was released by reformists. For the first time in two decades, Hassan Khomeini announced that a traditional religious event that was planned to be held in Ayatollah Khomeini's cemetery was canceled. Top reformist figures including Mohammad Khatami was scheduled to address the audience.

Music legend, Mohammad Reza Shajarian released a song he performed in the context of post election protests and crackdown of civil movement by the regime.

==== September 8 ====
Judiciary officials entered Karoubi's office in northern Tehran and told him and others inside to leave, ILNA said, adding documents, discs and other material were seized. "Karoubi's office has been sealed off upon the Tehran prosecutor's order," it quoted Esmail Gerami-Moghaddam, a spokesman for Karoubi's party, as saying. In another incident, Judiciary officials arrested Mousavi's top advisor Alireza Beheshti.

==== September 13 ====
People demonstrated in Qom after Yousef Sanei's speech.

==== September 18 ====
On Quds Day, an annual day of solidarity with the Palestinians, tens of thousands to one half million of protesters took part in a mass rally despite a warning by Revolutionary Guard against the demonstration of opposition supporters in Friday. Demonstrations took place in several locations in Tehran and other cities including Tabriz, Qom, Esfahan, Mashhad, Shiraz, Rasht, Booshehr, Ahvaz, and Kermanshah. This would be the first major protest since 17 July.

Mir Hossein Mousavi and other opposition leaders called people to participate in a mass protests against tyrants, both Iranian and non Iranian ones. Mousavi suggested the following to be chanted:

تفنگت را زمين بگذار که من بيزارم از ديدار اين خونبار چه در غزه - چه در لبنان چه در قدس و چه در ايران

(Put down your gun, because I hate to see that blood-thirsty thing, be it in Gaza, or Lebanon, in Quds or Iran)(based on a poem by Fereydoon Moshiri)

People wearing green accessories also chanted "Neither Gaza nor Lebanon, I sacrifice my life for Iran" and "Torture and rape are not effective any more". "Liar, where is your 63%?" was also shouted. Former president Mohammad Khatami who was among the protesters, was attacked by the son of ultra-conservative Hossein Shariatmadari, and sporadic fights broke out between the protesters and security forces. Tear gas was fired into the crowds, where protesters chanted in support of Mousavi. Both Mousavi and Karroubi attended the rally. As Ahmadinejad himself gave the keynote speech at Tehran University renewing comments about Israel and the Holocaust, tens of thousands chanted "Death to the dictator" in nearby streets. Supreme Leader Ayatollah Ali Khamenei banned demonstrations on Quds Day, but despite this, top opposition leaders joined the demonstrations. At least ten people were arrested during the demonstrations. The demonstrations began peacefully until tear gas was used against the demonstrators. Rocks and bricks were thrown. Several people were injured.

In its article, Lemonde.fr claim that people's minds have changed, that people are counter-attacking basij to free their friends, and that the government, facing these several months-long protests, is increasingly losing support, while the New York Times noticed the leniency of the police.

Handala, coming and watching Iranian Green Movement, has become a web mascot.

==== September 20 ====
Iranian actress Shohreh Aghdashloo wears a green wrist band in support of the reformers at the 61st Primetime Emmy Awards.

==== September 24 ====
Demonstrators from around the world gathered in New York City to protest against Ahmadinejad's speech to world leaders at the U.N. General Assembly.

==== September 28 ====
The Norooz website reported that about 1,000 students demonstrated at Tehran University. They carried green placards, the campaign colour of opposition leader Mir Hossein Musavi in the June election, and called for detained students to be freed and the government to resign. There were also around 50 members of a pro-government Islamic volunteer militia, the Basij, at the scene, shouting slogans against Musavi. Ahmadinejad had planned to speak at the university but was forced to cancel his visit there due to the large protests.

=== October ===
==== October 2 ====
The Tehran derby was watched by about 90,000 spectators and for the sixth straight time ended in a tie. The spectators accused the teams of collusion. They also chanted "Ya Hossein, Mir Hossein" in support of the opposition candidate Mir Hossein Mousavi. The Slogans could be heard on State TV. Police had previously warned against any political activity, even cutting off cellphone service in the area, and some people were reportedly arrested.

Unrelated to the Tehran derby, 18 students who were part of a pro-democracy movement were arrested in Tehran.

==== October 7 ====
The Middle East Studies Association of North America (MESA) wrote a letter to Ayatollah Ali Khamenei expressing concern over the handling of the election and the following protests. MESA especially condemned Iranian officials for the university raids and arrest of students.

==== October 24 ====
Basij Militia attacked Mehdi Karroubi and injured him when he attended Tehran's press exhibition.

==== October 28 ====
An Iranian student and math Olympics champion, Mahmoud Vahidnia, criticized supreme leader Ayatollah Ali Khamenei directly to his face for the violence and crackdown on protests. This is normally considered a crime to insult the Iranian leader punishable by a prison sentence.

=== November ===
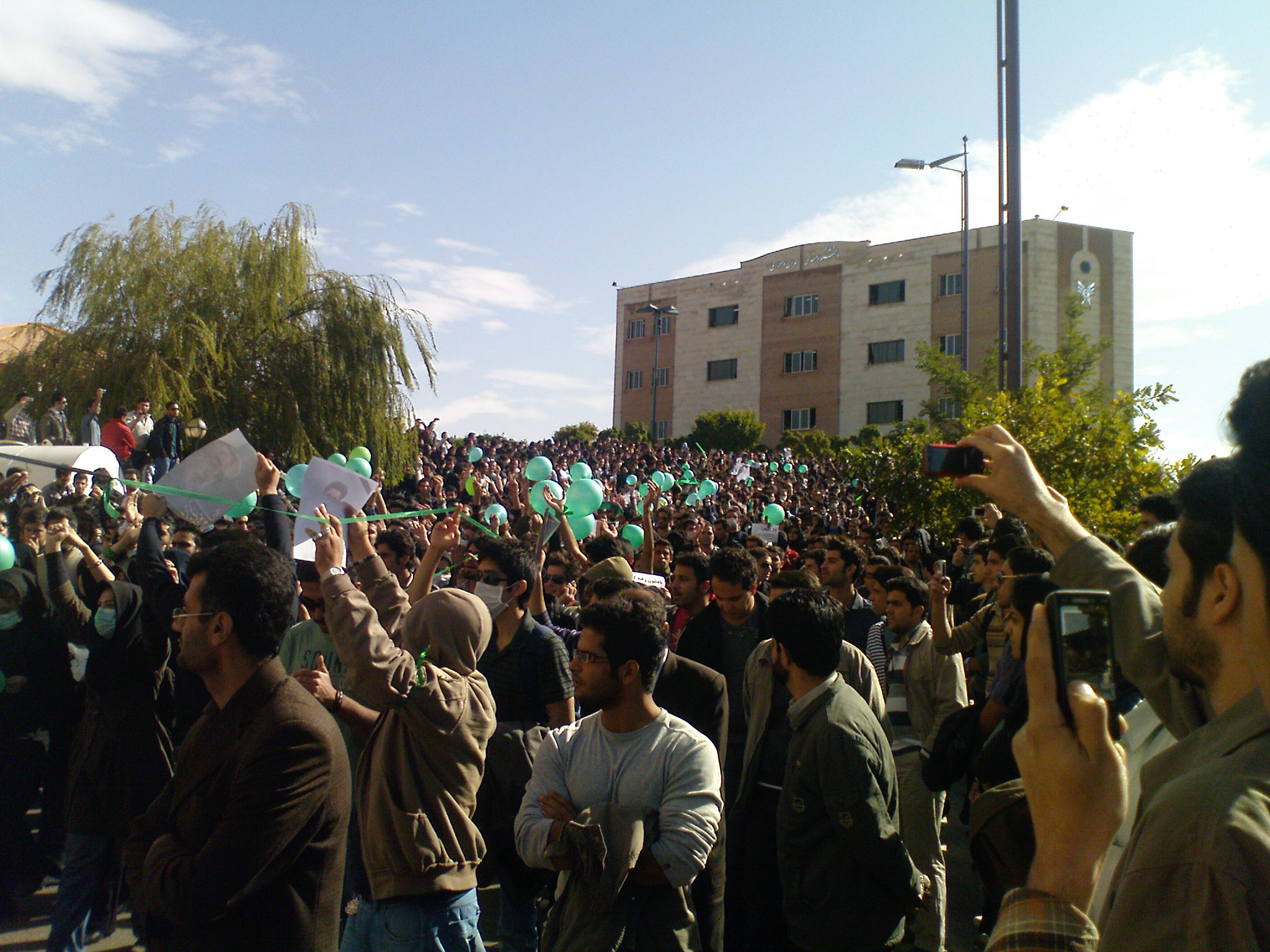
Protests in Azad University of Qazvin.

==== November 4 ====
In some of the biggest street demonstrations since mid-September, tens of thousands of protesters gathered in Tehran on the 13th of Aban, a state holiday in Iran which commemorates the student takeover of the American Embassy and the ensuing Iranian Hostage Crisis. Basij forces attacked protesters with clubs and teargas. Unconfirmed reports state that the Basij also fired live bullets. Protests also took place in Shiraz, Isfahan, Tabriz, Qazvin, Mashad, and Rasht. Reformist candidate Mousavi was banned from leaving his home, however Karroubi, another reformist candidate, briefly joined protests at Haft-e Tir Square, according to the reformist website Mowjcamp, but he was forced to flee when he was roughed up by "agitators". Several people were hospitalized due to injuries inflicted upon them by the Basij at the event and 109 people were arrested according to Iranian authorities.

During the official ceremony government supporters set fire to US flags to commemorate the 1979 embassy takeover. The ceremony was televised and, despite Iranian government authorities encouraging people to chant "Death to America," protesters instead chanted "Death to the Dictator". Protesters also chanted "A green Iran doesn't need nuclear weapons."

During the ceremony Grand Ayatollah Hossein Ali Montazeri called the seizure of the US embassy in 1979 a mistake, saying "The occupation of the American embassy at the start had the support of Iranian revolutionaries and the late Imam Khomeini and I supported it too, but considering the negative repercussions and the high sensitivity which was created among the American people and which still exists, it was not the right thing to do." Several protests were held online on this day as well.

==== November 22 ====
Former Iranian Vice President Mohammad-Ali Abtahi who was sentenced to six years imprisonment in connection with the June election protests was released on bail. (Xinhua) (AFP)

=== December ===
==== December 7 ====
December 7 (16 of Azar on the Iranian calendar) is Student Day in Iran (Persian: روز دانشجو). It is the anniversary of the murders of three students from the University of Tehran on December 7, 1953 by Iranian police under the Shah's rule. People across Iran broke out in protests on December 7, 2009 in remembrance of the murder and protests on this day in 1953, as well as the student protests in July 1999. The protests in July 1999 were, at that time, the most widespread public protests to occur in Iran since the Iranian Revolution. However, the 2009 election protests have surpassed the 1999 protests to become the largest protests in Iran since the Iranian Revolution.

Thousands of university students in Iran turned a student rally into anti-government protests. Security forces and militiamen clashed with thousands of protesters shouting "death to the dictator" outside Tehran University. The night before the protests, rooftop cries of "Allahu akbar" or "God is great" and "death to the dictator" were heard from many parts of Tehran in support of the opposition. The rooftop chants — which were almost every night in the weeks following the election — had not been heard since the November protest. Protests were held at most universities across the country, with the largest at University of Tehran, Amirkabir University, Khajeh Nasir University, Kerman University, Sharif University in Tehran, Azad University, Azad University of Qazvin, and Mashhad University. These would be the largest protests in Iran since November 4, 2009. Ayatollah Ali Khamenei blamed the United States and Britain for the protests At a speech in Mashhad, Former Iranian President Ali Akbar Hashemi Rafsanjani criticized the Iranian government's actions, quoting a verse from the Quran: "A secure society is a society that is pious and not subject to tyranny." According to reports, more than 200 people were arrested during the Students' Day protests and many were injured.

==== December 19 ====
One of the most influential members of the Green Movement and the former deputy supreme leader, Ayatollah Hossein-Ali Montazeri, dies. The government have denied any involvement with the senior cleric's death and Montazeri's son has been claimed to have stated his father died of natural causes.

==== December 21 ====
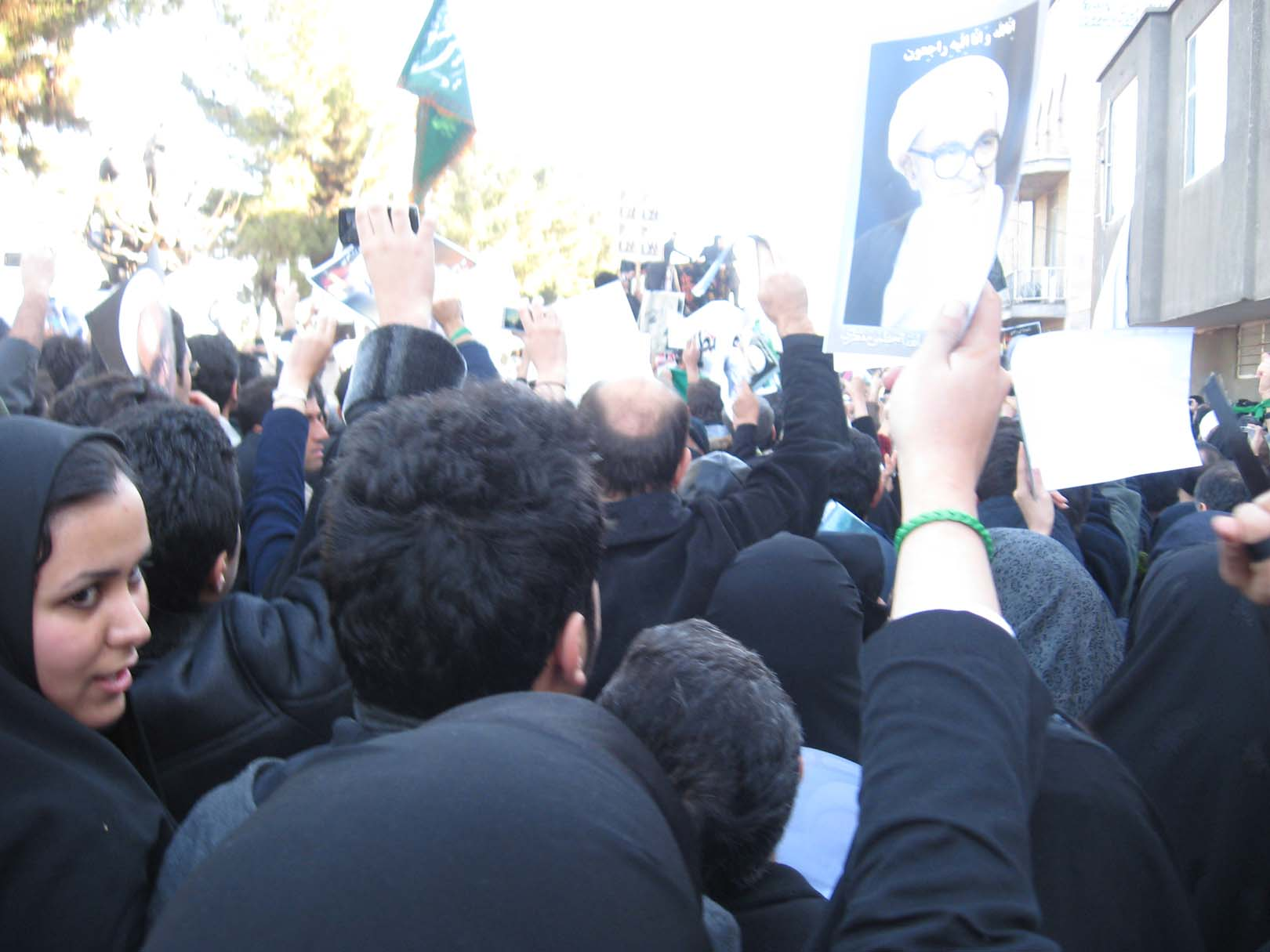
The funeral of Grand Ayatollah Hussein-Ali Montazeri

Hundreds of thousands of people attended the funeral of the Iranian cleric Grand Ayatollah Hossein Ali Montazeri in Qom. Hundreds of thousands of protesters wore green in support of the opposition.

On December 21, 2009, CNN broadcast an interview with a former Basij militiaman, identified only as Seyed (who had fled from Iran), who admitted that the Basij did indeed rig the results of the votes (under the pretext that it was the Supreme Leader's wish for Ahmadinejad to be president, and henceforth God's wish and fulfilling this was a duty for God), by placing votes requested by the disabled and the illiterate for Ahmadinjad, not counting votes for Mousavi at all, confirmed allegations of ballot box stuffing. They were made to attack protesters on the street with various weapons with no mercy and no separation between young and old or men and women. He also confirmed reports that there was torture and rape of both men and women of various ages inside Iran's prisons and the authorities had not only done nothing to prevent this but had encouraged this as well.

==== December 22 ====
Protests continued in Qom and clashes between security forces and protesters were reported.

==== December 23 ====
A memorial was held in honor of Montazeri in the city of Isfahan. Clashes occurred between Basiji militia and people attending the memorial.

==== December 24 ====
Mohammad Mehdi Heidarian, the president of the Iranian Academy of the Arts, and Reza Moradi Ghiasabadi, a researcher at the academy, resigned from their positions in protest at the firing of pro-reform leader, Mir Hossein Mousavi. Another 30 people threatened to resign in solidarity.

The Iranian government reportedly banned any more memorial services for Montazeri except in his birthplace and Qom.

==== December 26 ====
Protests erupted when Basiji militiamen barged into the Jamkaran mosque in Tehran, where reformist Mohammad Khatami was delivering a speech. Protests and clashes with security police occurred in several different cities in Iran.

==== December 27 ====
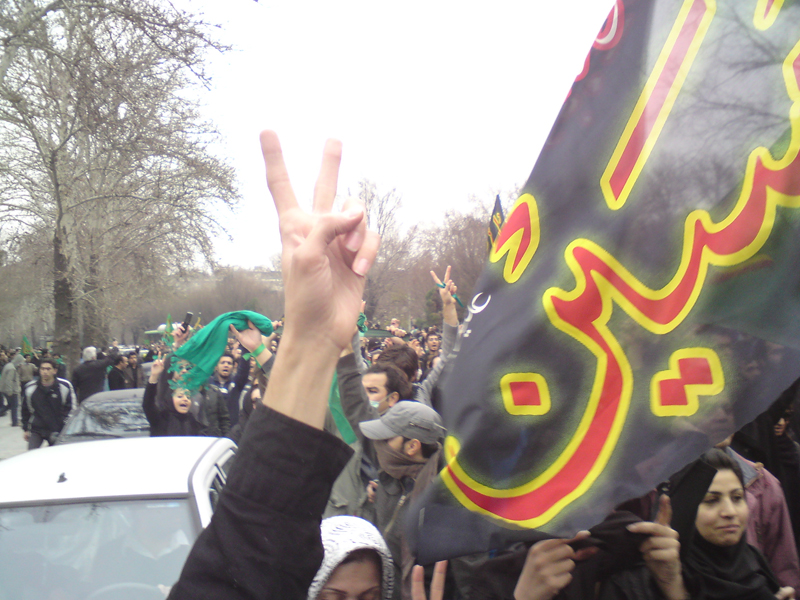
Protesters in Tehran on December 27, 2009

Major protests broke out when hundreds of thousands of opposition supporters protested in Tehran and across the country of Iran. This day was the Day of Ashura, which marks the death of Imam Hussain and is an important day on the Shiite calendar. Police fired upon protesters and used tear gas. State TV reported that 15 people died this day, yet official reports from the Iranian government put the death toll at 8, making this the deadliest day of the protests since June. Among those killed was Seyed Ali Mousavi, the nephew of Mir-Hossein Mousavi. At least 300 people were arrested. BBC called the protests "the worst violence since last June's contested presidential elections." Witnesses claim that the Basiji militia fired live bullets into the crowd. Although it was reported that many policemen refused to shoot on protesters. There were claims that some of the Basiji militia were wearing green caps (green being the color of the opposition movement) and refusing to detain the protesters. Protesters chanted "This month is a month of blood." A police depot was seized.

Anti-government, as well as pro-government demonstrations were reported in Shiraz, where Ayatollah Dastgheyb was said to be hiding in a mosque and being attacked by the Basij militia. In Tehran, Iranian state-owned media reported that tens of thousands of pro-government supporters rallied.

In Europe, protests were held the Iranian embassies in Berlin, Rome, London, and Paris. The European demonstrators were protesting against the violent crackdown on the protests in Iran.

==== December 28 ====
Several leading opposition activists were arrested, including three of Mousavi's top aides, two advisers to the reformist former president Mohammad Khatami, Nooshin Edabi, the sister of Nobel Peace Prize winner Shirin Ebadi (whose Peace Prize had been seized by Iranian authorities earlier in the year), and two other opposition activists, Ebrahim Yazdi, who previously served as foreign minister of Iran, and the human rights campaigner Emadeddin Baghi.

Seyed Ali Mousavi's body was confiscated from his family in an attempt by the government to prevent his funeral from becoming another anti-government demonstration. Iranian government security forces used tear gas to disperse the protesters that gathered outside the hospital where Seyed Ali Mousavi's body was.

US President Barack Obama condemns the violent crackdown on the protesters, and Russia expresses concern at the events, urging restraint. Other Western countries, including the UK, France, and others condemned the violent crackdown on protesters.

==== December 29 ====
Iran has accused the United States and Britain of orchestrating the violent demonstrations on the 27th. A spokesman for Iran's Foreign Ministry has said the US and UK had "miscalculated" in the governments response to protests that led to more than 1,500 arrests.

==== December 30 ====
Pro-government rallies take place in several cities to protest recent anti-government demonstrations. The New York Times wrote "A witness said many demonstrators on Wednesday were taken to protest sites by dozens of buses and were given free chocolate milk, and The Associated Press said the government had given all civil servants the day off to attend the rallies." Observers differed on whether the rally was a sign of strength or weakness for the regime.

Mir Hussein Moussavi's nephew was buried in Behesht-eh Zahra cemetery in Tehran amid tight security in which phones were jammed and plainclothes agents mingled with mourners.

An opposition news portal, Shahrzad News, claims to have in its possession a leaked order by the Supreme National Security Council ordering a jet be put on standby to fly Ali Khamenei and his family to Russia in case of further strengthening of the protests.

== 2010 ==
=== January ===
==== January 1 ====
During Friday Prayer services in the capital, Ayatollah Ahmad Jannati, a fundamentalist cleric who leads the powerful Guardian Council, called protesters "flagrant examples of the corrupt on Earth" and effectively urged that they be executed as "in the early days of the revolution."

In a public statement released through internet and to media outlets, Mir Hossein Mousavi declares he is ready to be martyred for his cause as hardliner clerics in the regime even call for his and other opposition leaders (including Mehdi Karoubi) execution. Mousavi said on his website: "I am not afraid to die for people's demands. Iran is in serious crisis. Harsh remarks will create internal uprising." As a way out of the crisis, Mousavi has put forward a five-point plan to the Government for political and social reforms. But he says Iran's leaders must accept responsibility for the crisis and stop its crackdown on dissent. He's called for the release of all political prisoners, more transparent election laws, and a recognition of the right to protest and a free press.

Huge protest took place in Mashhad University. More than 200 students of the Mashhad Open University in north-eastern Iran had been arrested, opposition websites reported. According to the reports, 210 students supporting the Green Movement had been arrested in the last 48 hours. The reports added that some of the students were also attacked by radical pro-government supporters and that two female students with stab wounds were in a critical condition. Several students gathered in front of a police station in Mashhad, demanding the immediate release of their fellow students and were further planning a sit-in-strike on Saturday at their university.

==== January 2 ====
Protests were held outside Iran in 28 cities around the world in support of the reform movement.

==== January 15 ====
Iranian Consul General Mohammad Reza Heydari in Oslo, Norway resigned in support of the protesters and urged fellow diplomats to do the same. Iran has also warned the opposition not to use cell phones or the internet as the government crackdowns more on the protests. Police chief Gen. Ismail Ahmadi Moghaddam says those "spreading the message of the opposition" will be prosecuted and punished.

==== January 23 ====
Iranians around the world demonstrated and commemorated what would have been Neda Agha Soltan's 27th birthday.

==== January 29 ====
Iranians around the world demonstrated after the Islamic Republic executed two political prisoners in Iran.

=== February ===
Early February

Answering to radicals clerics such Ayatollah Ahmad Jannati will to speed up executions, Iran's judiciary chief firmly state his opposition, commenting this will as being against the Sharia and law.

February 10

The Iranian government banned Gmail.

February 11

February 11 being the 31st anniversary of the Shah's regime collapse, the support protest is expected to be doubled by an opposition protest.

In the previous days, governmental forces arrested Khatami's brother as well as his wife, the grand daughter of Ayatollah Khomeini. Willing to slow down uncontrolled email exchanges, they also slowed down internet speed and blocked email services such as Google and Yahoo, while campaigning for a state supported email service.

On 11th, a massive crowd gathered to remember the 1979 revolution. Clashes were also noticed in areas with reformist protests. Police rushed on Karoubi's car, breaking a window, without injuring him.

YouTube places advertisements on their site promoting new videos of the Iranian protests were uploaded to the site.

February 12

Pietro Masturzo is awarded the World Press Photo for a picture they took of Iranian women shouting on a rooftop during the protests.

February 14

Iran arrested several Baháʼís for their religion, which is banned in Iran despite being originated there, along with opposition leaders, activists and journalists.

February 16

The unknown Iranians who filmed the Death of Neda Agha-Soltan were awarded the 2009 George Polk Award for Videography.

February 17

Approximately 1,200 Iranians signed a petition against a law that would limit women's rights.

February 18

Mohammed Raza Heydari and his family, Iran's former consul general in Oslo, was granted political asylum in Norway, following threats against him by the Iranian government because he quit his job in protest against the repression and violence which occurred during the election protests.

=== March ===
March 16

Violent clashes were reported between Iranian police and protesters after a massive protest was held throughout Iran during the Chaharshanbe Suri, over 50 protesters were reported to have been detained.

=== June ===
For months prior, large protests had been planned to take place on June 12, the one-year anniversary of the disputed 2009 Iranian Presidential Election.

June 10

Two days before the planned demonstrations, former presidential candidates and de facto leaders of the Green Movement, Mir-Hossein Mousavi and Mehdi Karroubi canceled the protests scheduled for Saturday "in order to protect people's lives and property".

Clashes between civilians and police forces broke out in Tehran's Enghelab Square at approximately 2:20 PM after authorities tried to arrest young women for "improper hijab". As the women resisted, fellow citizens came to their aid while drivers honked in protest. Four people were arrested after backup police arrived. According to witnesses, the police reacted brutally, beating anyone nearby.

June 11

On the day before the anniversary many Iranians reported receiving a threatening text message from the Ministry of Intelligence, stating: "Dear citizens, You have been deceived and foreign media to do their work. If you repeat this action, you will be punished under Islamic law."

June 12

Several scattered protests broke out throughout the country on the anniversary of the election, despite warnings from the government and security forces against protesting. However, there were no major widespread protests. Minor sporadic protest took place at Tehran's Azadi Square and at some universities throughout Iran. Mir-Hossein Mousavi and Mehdi Karroubi both cancelled planned protests fearing violence.

=== September ===
September 2

Pro-government mobs attacked the home of Mahdi Karroubi.

September 11

Hamid Mohseni, the head of Mir Hossein Mousavi's office was arrested by Iranian security forces.

September 12

Hossein Alizadeh, the Charge d'affaires and number 2 diplomat at the Iranian Embassy in Helsinki, Finland, resigned in protest of the Iranian government's hardline stance.

September 17

Iranian security forces raided the office of Mir Hossein Mousavi.

=== December ===
December 7

Students protest at Amirkabir University of Technology in Tehran. They are attacked by the basij and the protest is suppressed.

== 2011 ==
=== February ===
February 14

Iran's opposition has called for renewed street protests next week on the back of the wave of demonstrations that have swept across the Middle East. Mir Hossein Mousavi and Mehdi Karroubi, the leaders of the green movement in Iran, have issued a call for what they have described as "a solidarity move to support the protests in two Muslim countries of Egypt and Tunisia" on Monday.
