= List of cases of police brutality in Iran =

This is a list of notable cases of police brutality in Iran.

- 2009: During the Ashura protests across several cities, security forces opened fire on protestors, even though the Day of Ashura is a Shiite holy day "symbolically about justice" on which any kind of violence is forbidden. Security forces initially denied reports of deaths and stated that the police had not been armed; however, state television later acknowledged fatalities. An amateur video recorded a security truck deliberately running over protesters, and another shows a plain clothes security force shooting directly at protesters.
- 2009–10: during the election protests, police and the Basij paramilitary group suppressed not only rioting but also peaceful demonstrating, using batons, pepper spray, sticks and firearms. The Iranian government confirmed the deaths of 36 people during the protests, while unconfirmed reports by supporters of Mousavi allege that there were 72 deaths in the three months following the disputed election.
- Sept 16, 2022: 22-year-old Mahsa Amini was beaten by police and later died in hospital. Her death led to months of protests where Iranian morality police have slain several protestors.
