= Mousa Shubairi Zanjani =

Iranian Twelver Shia Marja' (1928–2026)

Grand Ayatollah Sayyid Mousa Shubairi Zanjani
- موسی شبیری زنجانی
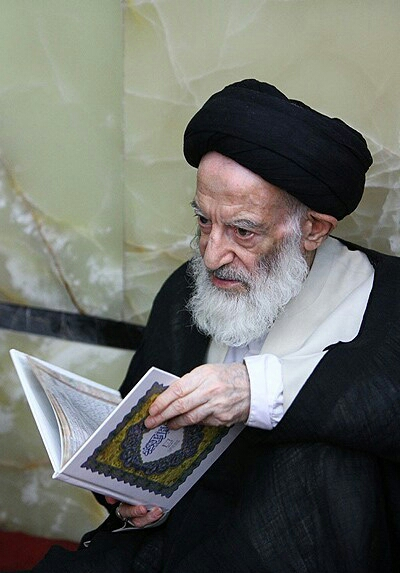
- Title: Ayatollah

Personal life
- Born: 2 March 1928 Qom, Persia
- Died: 20 September 2026 (aged 98) Qom, Iran
- Website: Official Website

Religious life
- Religion: Islam
- Denomination: Twelver Shia Islam

Muslim leader
- Based in: Qom, Iran
- Post: Grand Ayatollah
- Period in office: 1995–2026

Grand Ayatollah Sayyid Mousa Shubairi Zanjani (Persian: موسی شبیری زنجانی; 2 March 1928 – 20 September 2026) was an Iranian Twelver Shia marja'.

== Early life and teachings ==
Shubairi Zanjani was born in Qom to Sayyid Ahmed Shubairi Zanjani.

He studied in the Qom Seminary under Sayyid Hossein Borujerdi and Mohaqeq Damad, as well as in the Najaf Seminary under Sayyid Abu al-Qasim al-Khoei, Sayyid Muhsin al-Hakim, and Sayyid Abd al-Hadi Shirazi. He resided and taught in the seminary of Qom, having served as a leading expert on the discipline of Ilm ar-Rijal, which seeks to authentically and efficiently pass judgment on the reliability of narrators of Hadith. He also led the prayers at the Fatima Masumeh Shrine.

Zanjani's students included: Sayyid Muhammad-Kadhim al-Tabatabaei, Sayyid Abd al-Hadi al-Mas'udi, and Sayyid Adil al-Alawi.

He led Salat al-Janazah at the funeral of Hussein-Ali Montazeri, the deputy supreme leader of Iran in 2009.

== Marja'iyyah ==
Zanjani was one of seven jurists recognized as maraji al-taqlid by the Society of Seminary Teachers of Qom following the death of Mohammad Ali Araki in 1994.

== Works ==
Zanjani's works include writings on jurisprudence and principles, hadith, rijal, and dirayah.

His works in Islamic jurisprudence and principles include: Tahrir al-Jawahir, Tahrir Fatawa al-Jawahir, Sharh Hajj of Urwat al-Wuthqa, Taliqat on Jami Ahadith al-Shi'a, Research on the Rulings of Hajj, Selected Works of Jurisprudence and Hadith, Tawdih al-Masa'il, Durus al-Hajj, Durus al-Ijarah, Durus al-Khums, Durus al-Nikah, Durus al-Sawm, Durus al-I'tikaf, Durus al-Bay', Scattered Reports of the Lessons of His Teachers, Discussions on Ta'arud wa Tara'juh, Discussions on the Principle of Faragh wa Tajawuz, Manasik al-Hajj, and al-Masa'il al-Shar'iyya.

His works in hadith, rijal, and diraya include: al-Ta'liqa al-Kabira, al-Ta'liqa al-Saghira, Rijal al-Najashi, Durus al-Diraya, Faharis Rijal, and Asanid Ashab al-Ijma'.

== Death ==
Zanjani died from stomach bleeding in Qom, on 20 September 2026, at the age of 98.

Following his death, the governor of Qom announced three days of public mourning and said that 23 September would be a public holiday for his funeral. The governor of Zanjan also announced three days of public mourning.

== See also ==
- Lists of maraji
