= Ashura protests =

2009 protests in Iran against election

- Part of 2009 Iranian presidential election protests and the Montazeri protests
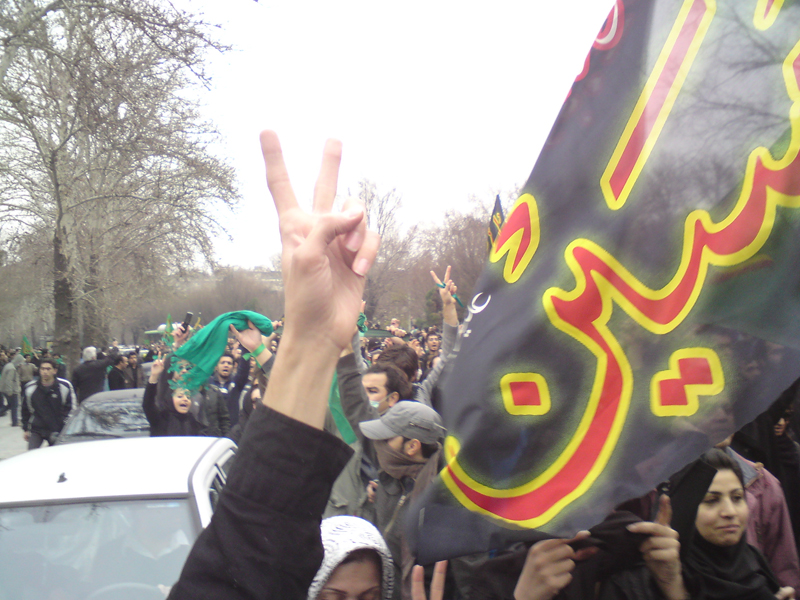
- Ashura protest in Keshavarz Boulevard, Tehran.
- Date: 27 December 2009 (Day of Ashura)
- Location: Various cities in Iran
- Caused by: Protesting the results of the national presidential election
- Goals: Government reform and removal of Mahmoud Ahmadinejad from the presidency
- Methods: Protest

Parties
Supporters of the Iranian Green Movement	(Iran) Iranian government

Casualties and losses
37 civilians + Seyed Ali Mousavi	

Casualties
- Deaths: 37 people
- Injuries: At least 60 people
- Arrested: Ebrahim Yazdi, Heshmat Tabarzadi
- Detained: More than 1400 300 to 550 people in Tehran, 400 to 500 people in Isfahan

The Ashura protests occurred on 27 December 2009 in Iran against the outcome of the June 2009 presidential election, which demonstrators claim was illegitimate due to electoral fraud. The demonstrations were part of the 2009 Iranian election protests and were the largest since June. In December 2009, the protests saw an escalation in violence.

In response to this protest, pro-government protesters held a rally three days later on 30 December (9 Dey) to condemn Green Movement protesters.

== Background ==
Irregularities during the 2009 Iranian presidential election caused resentment among many Iranians. While post-election protests were mostly peaceful, some violence erupted, leading to clashes between security forces and protesters, while some outspoken political dissenters were detained.

Dissenters continued to speak out against the government, leading to further protests in December 2009. On 19 December 2009, the former deputy supreme leader Hossein Ali Montazeri, who had become a spiritual leader of the opposition, died. Montazeri's funeral, held on 21 December in Qom was attended by a large gathering of people and clashes ensued between security forces and mourners, leading on to further demonstrations in Qom and Isfahan. On 26 December, a paramilitary Basij force subordinate to the Iranian Revolutionary Guard stormed a mosque in Tehran where scholar and former President Mohammad Khatami was speaking. This was followed by continued clashes in Tehran in which Jaras, a news media of the critics, estimated eight to ten people had died.

== Events ==
=== Protests ===
On 27 December, demonstrations in several cities continued into the holy day of Ashura, the climax of Muharram. Protesters in Tehran gathered in various locations such as Imam Hussain Square and Azadi Square. Protesters travelled from the two sites along Revolution Street.

Seyed Ali Mousavi, the nephew of Mir-Hossein Mousavi, was among those killed in the violence. Ali Mousavi died on 27 December 2009, when he was reportedly shot in either the back or the chest by security forces during demonstrations against Mahmoud Ahmadinejad's contested election win. It was reported by the Australian Broadcasting Corporation that Seyed Ali Mousavi was struck by a vehicle before he was killed. According to France 24, reformist website Parlemannews said that Moussavi’s nephew died in the hospital after he was shot in the chest. According to The Times, Mousavi’s nephew died prior to arriving at the hospital. Iranian filmmaker Mohsen Makhmalbaf, the official spokesman of Mir-Hossein Moussavi's campaign abroad, told BBC in an interview that Iranian secret police had called Seyed Ali Mousavi several times days before he was shot saying: "We will kill you." After Ali Mousavi died, his body was taken to Ebn-e Sina hospital, where protesters demonstrated outside. The protesters were broken up with tear gas by the Iranian security forces. It was later revealed that the government had removed his body and taken it to an undisclosed location in an attempt to crack down on the protests. Later, it was reported that his body had disappeared, precluding the possibility of a quick burial, while state sources indicated that an autopsy was being performed. Mousavi was buried on 30 December.

Similar protests took place in other Iranian cities including Isfahan, Najafabad, Shiraz, Mashhad, Arak, Tabriz, Babol, Ardabil and Orumieh. Four people were reportedly killed in Tabriz, in north western Iran on 27 December, and one in Shiraz in the south of Iran. Access for international news media was restricted by the Iranian government.

State controlled media initially denied any deaths, though it was indicated on 28 December that 15 had died. On 30 December, counter-rallies organized by the government at various cities, including Tehran, Qom, Arak, Shiraz and Isfahan, called for the death of the protesters, with government workers receiving the day off work to attend the demonstrations.

The incident caused more damage to the public's perception of the Green Movement with the Iranian citizenry than other actions from the protesters.

=== Violence ===
Lolagar mosque in Tehran was set into fire by the protesters, according to the State TV of Iran, leading to the death of some people in the mosque. Security forces allegedly opened fire on the day of Ashura. Security forces initially denied reports of deaths and the police chief, Azizollah Rajabzadeh, stated that the police had not been armed; state television later acknowledged fatalities. Amateur video was produced which showed a security truck deliberately running over protesters. Security forces were armed with guns and shot at protesters.

=== Arrests ===
Among the hundreds of people arrested in the aftermath of the Ashura demonstrations area were prominent lawyers, journalists, clerics and politicians, family members of prominent human rights activists and reformist politicians. These include:

- Ebrahim Yazdi, the Secretary-General of the Freedom Movement of Iran. Yazdi's niece Leila Tavassoli was reportedly arrested as well.
- Nobel Peace Prize laureate Shirin Ebadi's sister Noushin Ebadi, who was detained in an apparent effort to silence Ebadi who is abroad. Shirin Ebadi wrote in a statement following her sister's arrest: "my sister is not politically active nor is she a member of any human right organization. Her only crime seems to be that she is my sister and her arrest is nothing less than a political blackmail and attempted pressure. This is another method employed by the authorities in Iran to stop my activities."
- Heshmat Tabarzadi, an Iranian journalist and veteran democratic activist.
- Emad Baghi, a prominent human rights activist and journalist, and head of the Society for the Defense of the Rights of the Imprisoned. Baghi reportedly told his family as he was being arrested that "he would be strong in jail, and resist pressure [by hardliners]." The officer arresting him responded: "He [Baghi] will not live that long to resist."
- Journalists Mashallah Shamsolvaezin, Reza al-Basha, Badralsadat Mofidi, Mohammad Javad Saberi, Nasrin Vaziri, Kayvan Mehrgan, Reza Tajik, Mostafa Izadi, and Morteza Kazemian.
- Morteza Haji, a former government minister and a Khatami aide, as well as Haji's deputy Reza Rasouli. Hasan Rasool, a Khatami aide and the deputy director of the Baran Institute, was also arrested.
- Zahra Bahrami, a Dutch and Iranian dual citizen, who was executed in January 2011 on drugs charges

== Trials ==
Many people are set to stand trial for taking part in the protests. At least one person arrested in connection with the protest, a university lecturer Abdolreza Ghanbari living in Pakdasht, was accused of "moharebeh," (an Islamic term meaning "warring against God") and sentenced to death.

== International reaction ==
The governments of Canada, France, Germany, the United Kingdom and the United States condemned the violence. US President Barack Obama criticized the Iranian government's actions at the protests. Venezuela condemned Western governments' interference in Iran's internal affairs.

== See also ==
- Timeline of the 2009 Iranian election protests
- Politics and Government of Iran
