= Death and funeral of Hussein-Ali Montazeri =

2009 funeral of the Iranian deputy supreme leader

- Part of the 2009 Iranian presidential election protests
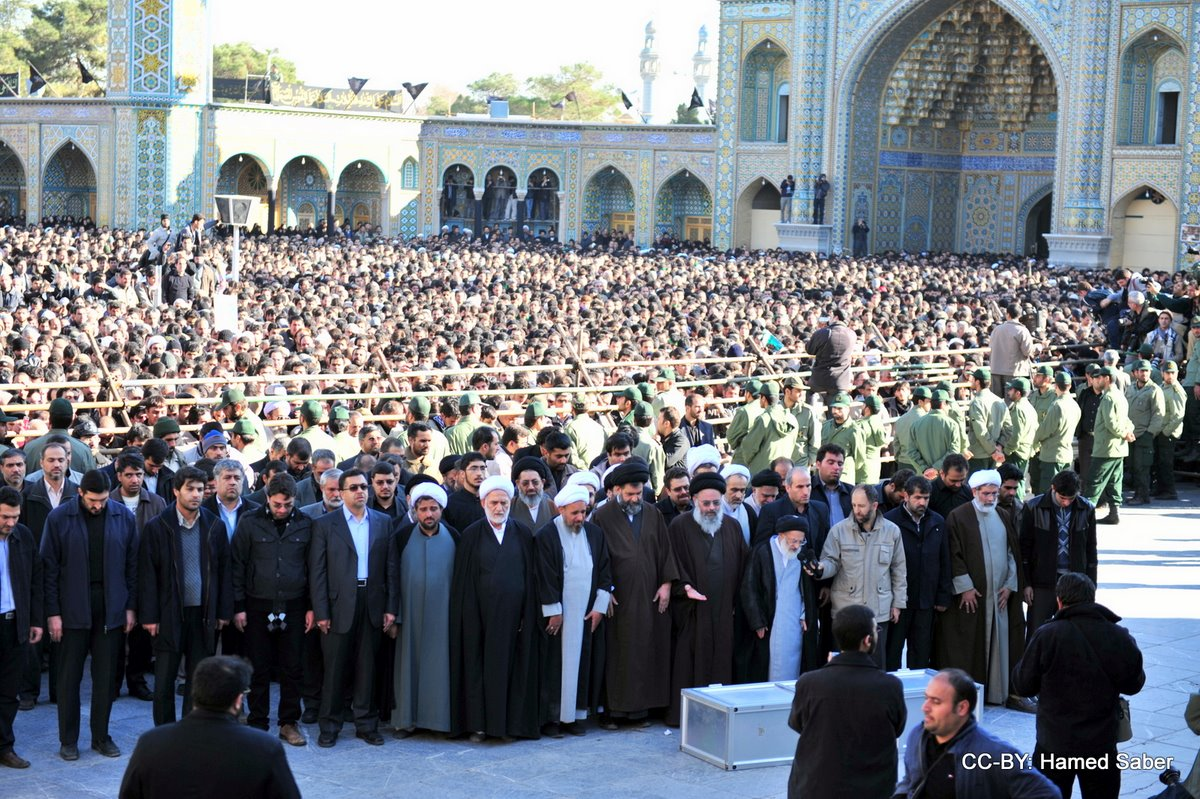
- Funeral prayer over the body of Montazeri led by Mousa Shubairi Zanjani
- Date: 01:00, 19 December 2009 (IRST); 21 December 2009 (funeral); 21–27 December 2009 (protests)
- Location: Qom, Iran (death and funeral) Nationwide (protests)
- Participants: Iranian officials and clerics, relatives and thousands of followers
- Deaths: Multiple; not specified (Note: Witnesses say there were many deaths but the number is not specified)
- Burial: Fatima Masumeh Shrine, Qom, Iran
- Arrests: 50+

On 19 December 2009, 01:00 IRST, Hussein-Ali Montazeri, the only deputy supreme leader of the Islamic Republic of Iran (IRI), died in his sleep of heart failure at his complex in Qom, at the age of 87. There were many reactions following the death. Various personalities and parties expressed their condolences on the passing. In a joint statement, Mir-Hossein Mousavi and Mehdi Karroubi, the leaders of the Green Movement, declared 21 December a day of mourning. From 21 to 27 December, there were nationwide protests following his death, which are known as the Montazeri protests.

Initial estimates of the funeral were that "hundreds of thousands of people" attended the ceremony, with some sources declaring the attendance to be "millions." The Islamic Republic News Agency, the official news agency of Iran, did not use the Ayatollah title in its initial reports of his death and referred to him as the "clerical figure of rioters". The state television and radio broadcasters were similar, showing the tension between the government and its opponents. Montazeri's funeral was said to have marked "a new phase" in the 2009 Iranian presidential election protests.

== Funeral service ==
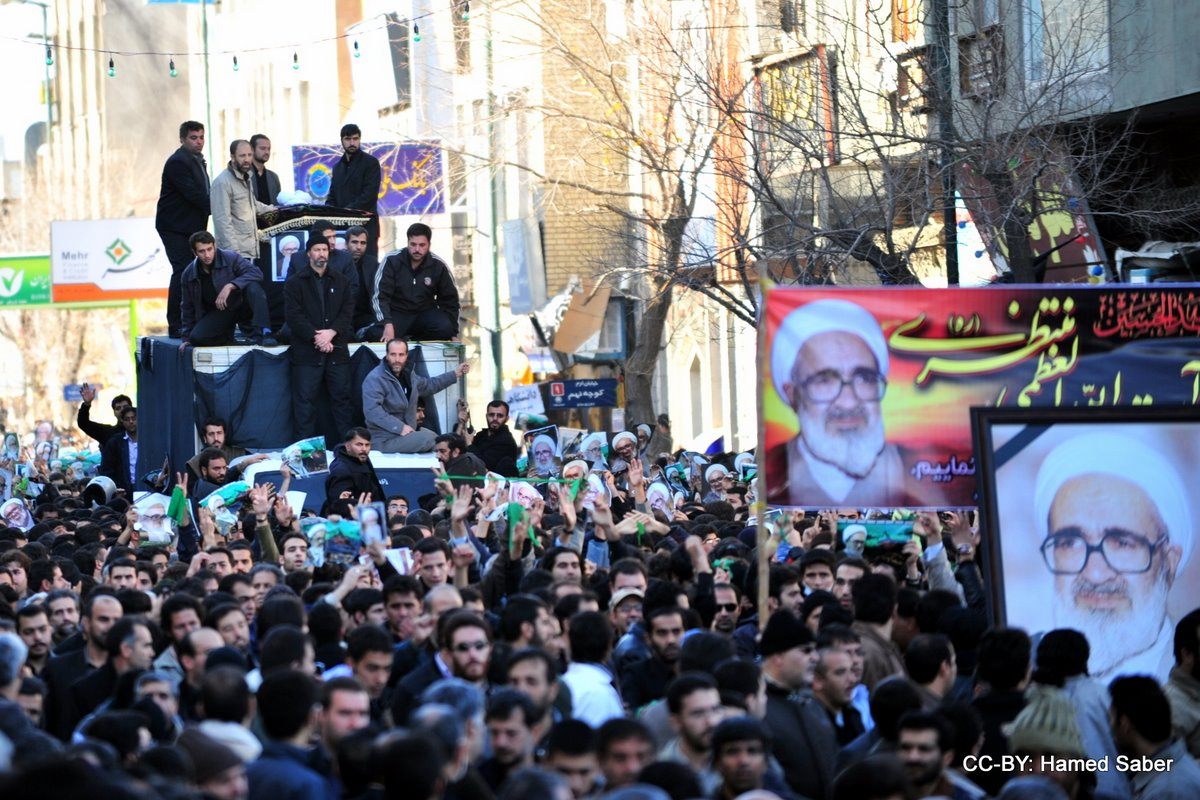
Mourning men at the streets of Qom

On 21 December, hundreds of thousands of mourners and the Iranian Green Movement turned out at Montazeri's funeral and turned it into a protest against the government. The funeral began at his house and prayers were held at the Grand Mosque in Qom. After salat al-janazah led by Mousa Shabiri Zanjani, Montazeri's body was laid to rest in the Fatima Masumeh Shrine. He was buried alongside his son, Mohammad.

The protesters chanted opposition slogans, including "Our shame, our shame, our idiot leader", and “Dictator, this is your last message: the people of Iran are rising!” Although the police mostly stayed clear of the funeral, there were skirmishes between protesters and the Basij militia. Inside the Fatima shrine, opposition activists gathered and chanted “Death to the dictator.” When pro-government basiji militiamen came toward them, chanting “Death to the hypocrites,” the crowd changed to an anti-basiji slogan. Then they took out money, offering it to the basiji, and chanted that they were acting as paid mercenaries of the government: “Where is the oil money? Spent on the Basiji,” and “Basij’s great pride, rape in prison.”

Mir-Hossein Mousavi left the compound of Grand Ayatollah Saanei, a fellow reformist, to cross the street to Montazeri's house. At that moment, a group of 30 bearded men, holding Montazeri pictures to blend into the crowd, dropped the portraits, started attacking Mousavi and shouted “death to the hypocrite.” The former candidate was hustled into the Montazeri compound. The same thing happened when cleric Mehdi Karroubi stepped into the street, reformists were ready and pushed back the vigilantes, so Karroubi could pass.

As the funeral procession ended, security forces poured into the city, blocking roads to the Ayatollah's house and tearing down posters of him. Mourners were reported to have thrown stones at police, who tried to stop them chanting pro-Montazeri slogans. Mourners responded defiantly when ordered by loudspeaker not to chant, breaking into shouts of "Ya Hossein, Mir Hossein" in support of him. When a crowd of pro-government supporters chanted back: "I will give my life for the supreme leader," they were booed by mourners, a witness said. The security forces prevented the Ayatollah's family from holding a memorial ceremony in the grand mosque of Qom following the funeral.

According to the reformist site Kalameh, men on motorbikes, believed to be Ahmadinejad supporters, attacked the car carrying Mousavi back from Qom to Tehran. They insulted Mousavi, smashed the back window and injured an aide. There were also protests in Najafabad, birthplace of Montazeri. Videos showed protesters waving green banners and chanting, “Dictator, dictator, Montazeri is alive!” and “Oh Montazeri, your path will be followed even if the dictator shoots us all!”

== Protests ==
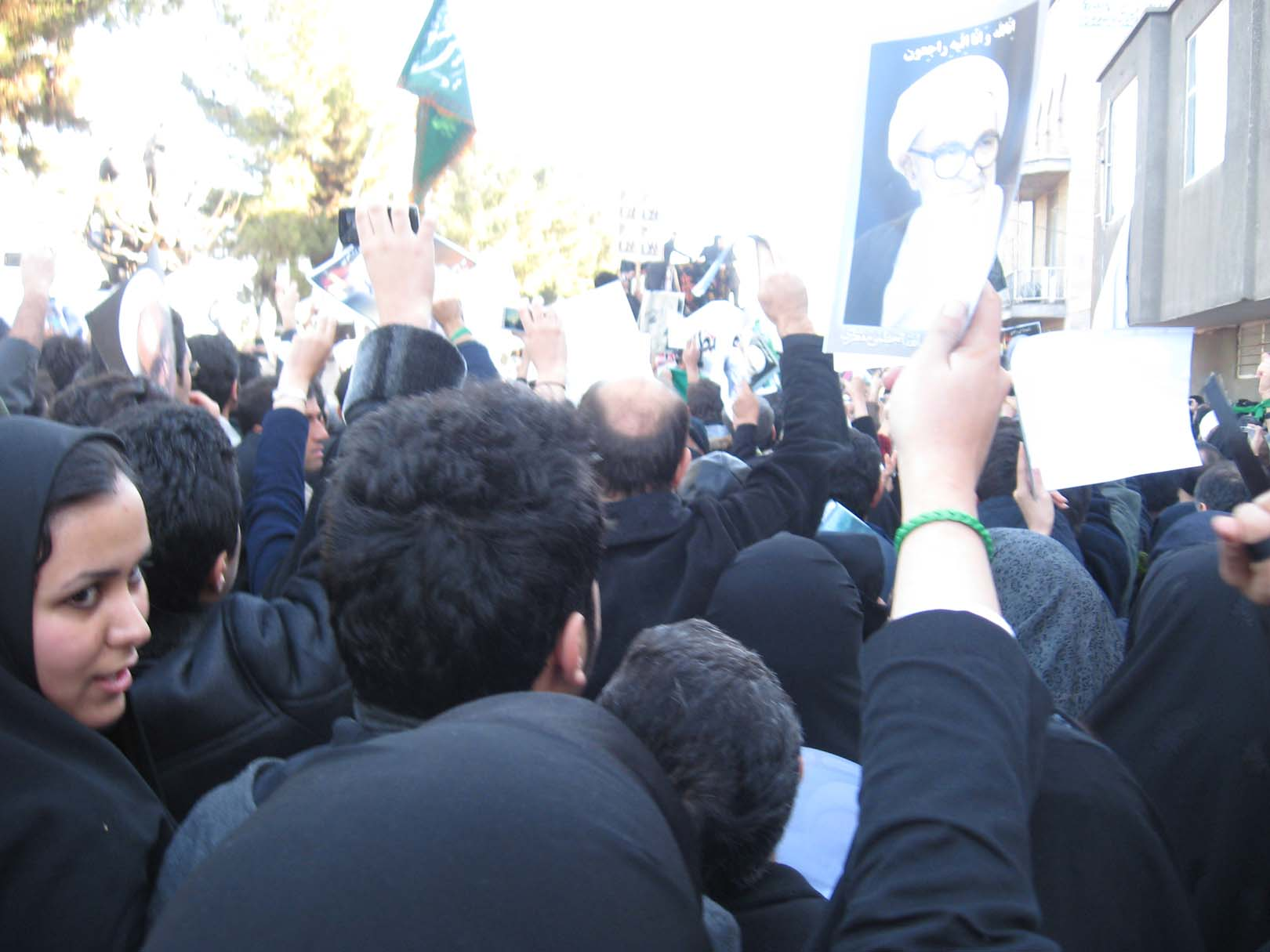
Protesters at the funeral of Montazeri

=== 22 and 23 December ===
On 22 December, Ahmadinejad continued his quest to strip opponents of their power. He interrupted a visit to Shiraz to return to Tehran and remove Mousavi, as head of the state Academy of Arts and Culture- a post he had held for ten years. Hardliners wanted Mousavi arrested for his role in inciting unrest since the disputed June election.

On 23 December, security forces clashed with tens of thousands of opposition supporters in Isfahan, according to opposition websites. Activists said police used tear gas, pepper spray and batons to disperse people gathering to commemorate Montazeri in the Seyed mosque. People had gathered at the main mosque for the memorial service, but the doors were closed and security forces told them to leave. Security forces began beating people, including women and children, with batons, chains and stones, used tear gas and pepper spray and arrested 50 people, including four journalists and a cleric, Masoud Abid, who was to deliver the sermon. One witness said, "They took people in the shops and beat them up mostly out of public view though some beatings happened outside on the streets." Security forces sealed off the home of Ayatollah Jalal Al-Din Taheri, who organised the service and lead prayers in Isfahan until he resigned in 2002 in protest at the government's authoritarianism. Meanwhile, footage sent to the BBC from Najafabad showed crowds chanting "Criminals, rapists, death to the leadership" and "We're not afraid, we're not afraid" as security men watched from rooftops.

Police severely attacked mourners and protesters in several cities, with many wounded and arrested. The government announced that banknotes with anti-government annotation, which had recently spread, would be forbidden.

=== 24 December ===
On 24 December, opposition sites reported that police in Tehran and the northwest city of Zanjan clashed with protesters defying an order by the Iranian government banning memorial services for Montazeri. Protesters marched in Imam Khomeini Square in southern Tehran, in a sign of mourning. The protesters chanted, "Today is a mourning day; the green nation of Iran is mourning today"—a reference to the color of the opposition. The police attacked protesters with clubs. Older women tried to prevent the arrest of young men by throwing themselves on them, and were severely beaten by officers.

The police in Zanjan, a city of mostly Turkish speakers, tried to prevent a mourning ceremony for Montazeri by locking the mosque where the ceremony was to be held, and attacking mourners who chanted outside. “The police beat people with such violence that many suffered from broken legs, arms and noses.” There were many arrests.

=== 26 December ===
Witnesses and opposition websites reported the following:

- Protests in areas of the capital, including the poorer areas of south Tehran, and government forces using tear gas to try to disperse demonstrators.
- Clashes in northern Tehran near Jamaran mosque (where Khomeini used to address people), between thousands of opposition supporters and riot police. Reformist ex-President Mohammad Khatami had been due to speak there to mark the Shiite holy day of Ashura. However, security officials cancelled the speech and surrounded the mosque. A reformist website reported about 50 plainclothes forces breaking into Jamaran mosque and attacking people. Riot police fired tear gas. Protesters shouted, "death to this dictatorship" and "if Khomeini was alive, he would sure be with us," according to witnesses. A witness said, "Police told them they have five minutes to leave and, when they were still shouting slogans and persisted, policemen on motorbikes drove through the crowds and fired teargas." Riot police and members of the Basij also chased demonstrators into the nearby bustling Niavaran street and fired paintballs at them. The security forces arrested protesters. Clashes were reported between police and protesters near another north Tehran mosque, Dar al-Zahra, known to host reformist clerics.
- Opposition supporters gathered in groups along a stretch of a main Tehran route kilometres long, but police were out in force and not letting them join each other. There were clashes at along Enghelab Street, a main thoroughfare where months earlier hundreds of thousands of opposition supporters had staged protest marches after Ahmadinejad's disputed re-election. Police arrested bus passengers near Enghelab Square because they were chanting pro-opposition slogans. Protesters were reported to chant: "The dictator must know that he will soon be overthrown."
- Tension at rallies in which protesters chanted anti-government slogans in three areas of Tehran. Government forces, including soldiers of the elite Revolutionary Guard and the paramilitary Basiji, are said to have beat protesters with batons, fired warning shots to disperse demonstrators, used teargas and pepper spray and smashed the car windscreen of those were hooting in protest, as well as made arrests.
- Security forces chased protesters into a building housing the offices of the ISNA news agency, where demonstrators had sought shelter during the clashes. “They fractured the skull of one ISNA person and badly beat up another employee,” the witness said. ISNA's news service appeared to be working normally.
- An elderly woman travelling on a city bus was heard urging passengers to chant slogans such as "Ya Hossein, Mir Hossein" in support of Mousavi, a witness said. The witness said passengers on the packed bus also chanted "Our Neda is not dead, it is the government which is dead," referring to protester Neda Agha Soltan, who bled to death during a 20 June protest in scenes caught on video and viewed by millions.
- Witnesses said riot police fired warning shots in areas of Tehran to deter demonstrators, many of whom chanted slogans increasingly against the country's supreme leader, Ayatollah Ali Khamenei.
- Clashes were reported in cities including Isfahan, Kermanshah and Shiraz, as opposition supporters used the Tasua and Ashura ceremonies to take to the streets.
