= Iranian Green Movement =

Political movement after the 2009 Iranian presidential election

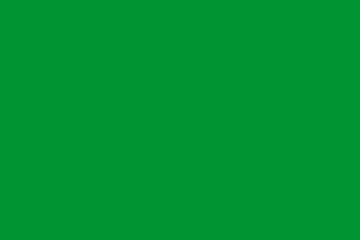
The flag often used by the Iranian Green Movement

The Iranian Green Movement (Persian: جنبش سبز ایران, romanized: Jonbeš-e Sabz-e Irân) or Green Wave of Iran, also referred to as the Persian Awakening or Persian Spring by Western media, refers to a political movement that arose after the 12 June 2009 Iranian presidential election and lasted until early 2010, in which protesters demanded the removal of Mahmoud Ahmadinejad from office. Green was initially used as the symbol of Mir Hossein Mousavi's campaign, but after the election it became the symbol of unity and hope for those asking for annulment of what they regarded as a fraudulent election. Mir Hossein Mousavi and Mehdi Karroubi are recognized as political leaders of the Green Movement. Former deputy supreme leader, Hussein-Ali Montazeri was also mentioned as spiritual leader of the movement.

The Green Movement protests were a major event in Iran's modern political history and observers claimed that these protests were the largest since the Iranian Revolution of 1978–79. While the protests started out as a peaceful, non-violent movement, hundreds of people were arrested and several died as protests turned more violent in the following months. The movement eventually had trouble with retaining its momentum.

== Outcome of 2009–2010 Iranian election protests ==
Background to the protests

The office of the President in Iran is considered the second most powerful position in the country, after that of the Supreme Leader, as the President is the head of the executive branch of power. Since 2005, Iran was led by conservative Mahmoud Ahmadinejad, who first served as mayor of Tehran before being elected as president. Ahmadinejad's name was associated with human rights violations in the country, particularly with the use of violence. The list of these violations included the increased number of death penalties and problems with LGBT rights. According to Human Rights Watch, "basic human rights protection in Iran has deteriorated to new lows" under Ahmadinejad's first presidency as, for example, the number of executions increased by three times. The Iranian president has no power over the judiciary, as it is headed by the chief justice who is in turn appointed by the Supreme Leader.

During the first presidency of Ahmadinejad, the problem was particularly severe with juvenile death penalty. More than 130 juvenile offenders were sentenced to death in Iran as of 2008. Moreover, independent researchers pointed out that the number of political prisoners increased during Ahmadinejad's first presidency. Other problems with human rights involved the absence of basic protection of LGBT rights. The number of criminal convictions for homosexual sex increased between 2005 and 2009, while the President even denied the existence of gay people in Iran.

Issues with human rights and other problems, such as the alleged voting fraud, led Ahmadinejad's popularity to decline. This was especially the case in urban areas, including the country's capital Tehran, and among the youth, according to The Guardian.

In 2009, the Iranian government held a regular presidential election. Former Prime Minister Mir-Hossein Mousavi was the most popular candidate opposing Ahmadinejad.

The election took place on 12 June 2009 but the disagreement between the government and the opposition over the results of the election quickly caused a significant controversy. Ahmadinejad was considered to be winning in a landslide victory, but Mousavi and his supporters believed the results were fraudulent. They suggested that the Interior Minister Sadegh Mahsouli, an ally of Ahmadinejad, had interfered with the election and distorted the votes to keep Ahmadinejad in power.

Mousavi claimed the victory and called for his supporters to celebrate it. At the same time, the office of Mahmoud Ahmadinejad almost immediately announced that the sitting president had won the election as he had received approximately two-thirds of votes. It sparked the 2009–2010 Iranian election protests, which were organized mostly by Mousavi's supporters and were directed against Ahmadinejad and the government in general.

Previously, he was revolutionary, because everyone inside the system was a revolutionary. But now he's a reformer. Now he knows Gandhi – before he knew only Che Guevara. If we gain power through aggression we would have to keep it through aggression. That is why we're having a green revolution, defined by peace and democracy.

— Mohsen Makhmalbaf, 19 June 2009

=== Protests ===
Clashes broke out between police and groups protesting the election results from early morning on Saturday onward. At the beginning, the protests were considered peaceful. However, as time passed, they became increasingly violent. In a stand-off that later took place in north Tehran between supporters of Ahmadinejad and Mousavi, an angry crowd of citizens broke into shops, started fires, and tore down signs. Civil unrest took place as riot police on motorbikes used batons to disperse Mousavi supporters who staged a sit-in near the interior ministry, where the results were announced. Up to 2,000 Mousavi supporters erected barricades of burning tyres and chanted "Mousavi take back our vote!".

The demonstrations grew bigger and more heated than the 1999 student protests. Al Jazeera English described the 13 June situation as the "biggest unrest since the 1979 revolution." It also reported that protests seemed spontaneous without any formal organization. Two hundred people protested outside Iran's embassy in London on 13 June. Ynet has stated that "tens of thousands" protested on 13 June. Demonstrators are chanting phrases such as "Down with the dictator", "Death to the dictator", and "Give us our votes back". Mousavi urged for calm and asked that his supporters refrain from acts of violence.

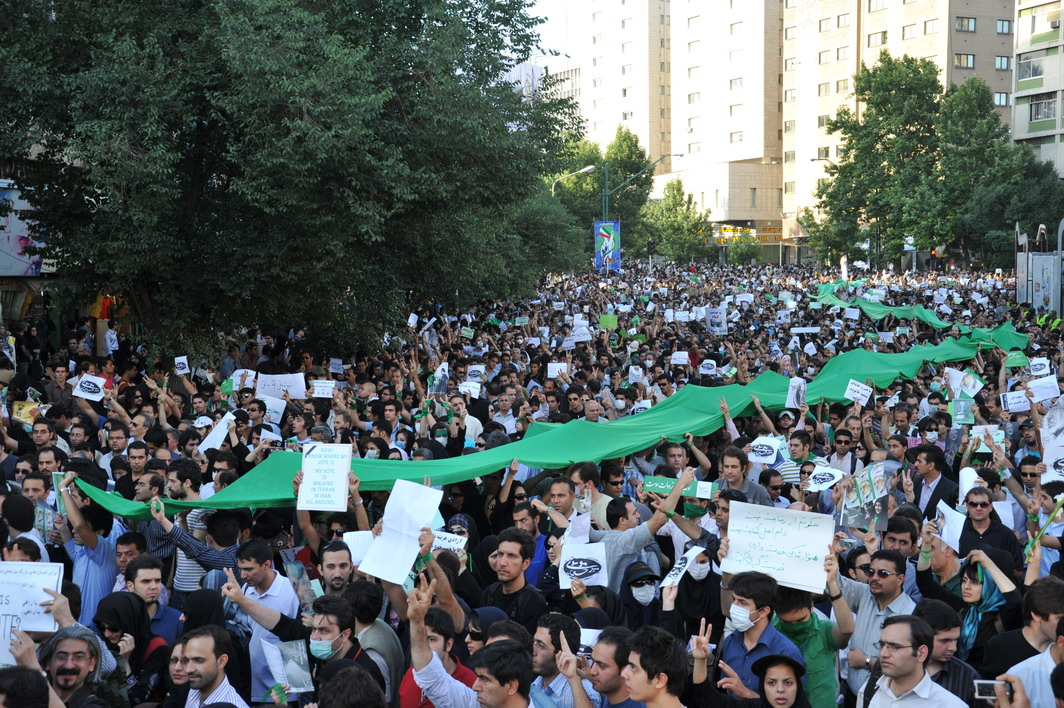
Protesters in Tehran, 16 June

Ynet reported on 14 June that two people had died in the rioting so far. That day, protests had been organized in front of the Iranian embassies in Turkey, United Arab Emirates, France, Germany, UK, Italy, Australia, Austria and The Netherlands. In response to the reformist protests, tens of thousands of people rallied in Tehran on 14 June to support the victory of Ahmadinejad.

On 15 June, Mousavi rallied, with a number of his supporters ranging anywhere from hundreds of thousands to three million, in Tehran, despite being warned by state officials that any such rally would be illegal. The demonstration, the largest in the Islamic Republic of Iran's 30-year history, was Mousavi's first public appearance after the election. Protests focused around Azadi Tower, around which lines of people stretched for more than nine kilometers. Gunshots were reported to have been fired at the rally, where Mousavi had spoken to his supporters saying, "The vote of the people is more important than Mousavi or any other person." All three opposition candidates made an appearance.

Competing rallies for Mousavi and for Ahmadinejad took place on 16 June. The pro-Ahmadinejad protesters, chanting the phrases "Death to America!" and "Death to Israel!", outnumbered their opponents, but they did not match the numbers of opponents who had protested the day before. Reports from the state media and elsewhere stated on 16 June that seven people have died in all of the protests so far. However, Times Online quoted a Rasoul Akram Hospital nurse that day who asserted that 28 people have suffered from "bullet wounds" and eight have died so far. Over half a million reformist Iranians marched silently from Haft-e-Tir Square to Vali Asr Square on 17 June. Huffington Post reported that day that 32 people had died protesting so far.

On 14 February 2011, the largest Green demonstrations in Iran in more than a year broke out. In response, pro-government MPs called for the death of opposition leaders Mir Hussein Moussavi and Mehdi Karroubi.

=== Government actions ===
==== Arrests ====
On the weekend of 13 and 14 June, the government arrested over 170 people in a series of raids across Tehran. Among them were prominent reformist politicians, including Mojahedin of the Islamic Revolution Organization (MIRO) founder Behzad Nabavi, Islamic Iran Participation Front (IIPF) leader Mohsen Mirdamadi, and former president Mohammad Khatami's brother Mohammad-Reza Khatami, who was later released. Also arrested were Mostafa Tajzadeh and Mohsen Aminzadeh, whom the IRNA said were involved in orchestrating protests on 13 June. Anonymous sources said that the police stormed the headquarters of the IIPF and arrested a number of people. Iranian journalist Mashallah Shamsolvaezin claimed that presidential candidate Mir-Hossein Mousavi was put under house arrest, although officials denied this. An estimated 200 people were detained after clashes with students at Tehran University, although many were later released. The Guardian actively reported those who died or were detained in a spreadsheet listing 1,259 names as victims of Iran’s crackdown.

Acting Police Chief Ahmad-Reza Radan stated via the state press service on the 14th that "in the interrogation of related rebels, we will try to find the link between the plotters and foreign media". A judiciary spokesman said they had not been arrested but that they were summoned, "warned not to increase tension," and later released. Intelligence minister Gholam Hossein Mohseni-Ejehei linked some arrests to terrorism supported from outside Iran, stating that "more than 20 explosive consignments were discovered". Others, he said, were "counter-revolutionary groups" who had "penetrated election headquarters" of the election candidates.

On 16 June, Reuters reported that former vice-president Mohammad-Ali Abtahi and former presidential advisor Saeed Hajjarian had been arrested. Human rights lawyer Abdolfattah Soltani, who had been demanding a recount of all votes, was also arrested on the Tuesday according to Shirin Ebadi, who said that security officials had posed as clients. Over 100 students were arrested after security forces fired tear gas at protesters at Shiraz University on the same day. Reporters Without Borders reported that 5 of 11 arrested journalists were still detention as of 16 June, and that a further 10 journalists were unaccounted for and may have been arrested.

On 17 June, former foreign minister and secretary-general of the Freedom Movement of Iran, Ebrahim Yazdi, was arrested while undergoing tests at Pars hospital in Tehran. He was held overnight in Evin Prison before being released and returning to hospital, where according to Human Rights Watch he remained under guard. In Tabriz, other Freedom Movement activists and eight members of the IIPF were arrested, with reports of at least 100 civic figures' arrests. The total number of arrests across Iran since the election was reported as 500.

Aaron Rhodes, a spokesman for the International Campaign for Human Rights in Iran, stated that "Iranian intelligence and security forces are using the public protests to engage in what appears to be a major purge of reform-oriented individuals whose situations in detention could be life-threatening". In Isfahan Province, prosecutor-general Mohammadreza Habibi warned that dissidents could face execution under Islamic law.

In 2011, Mir Hossein Mousavi and his wife and Mehdi Karroubi were placed under house arrest by the government. During his election campaigns in 2013 and 2017, then-presidential candidate Hassan Rouhani pledged to release them if he were to be elected as president, but the opposition leaders remain under house arrest to this day.

== Where is my vote? ==
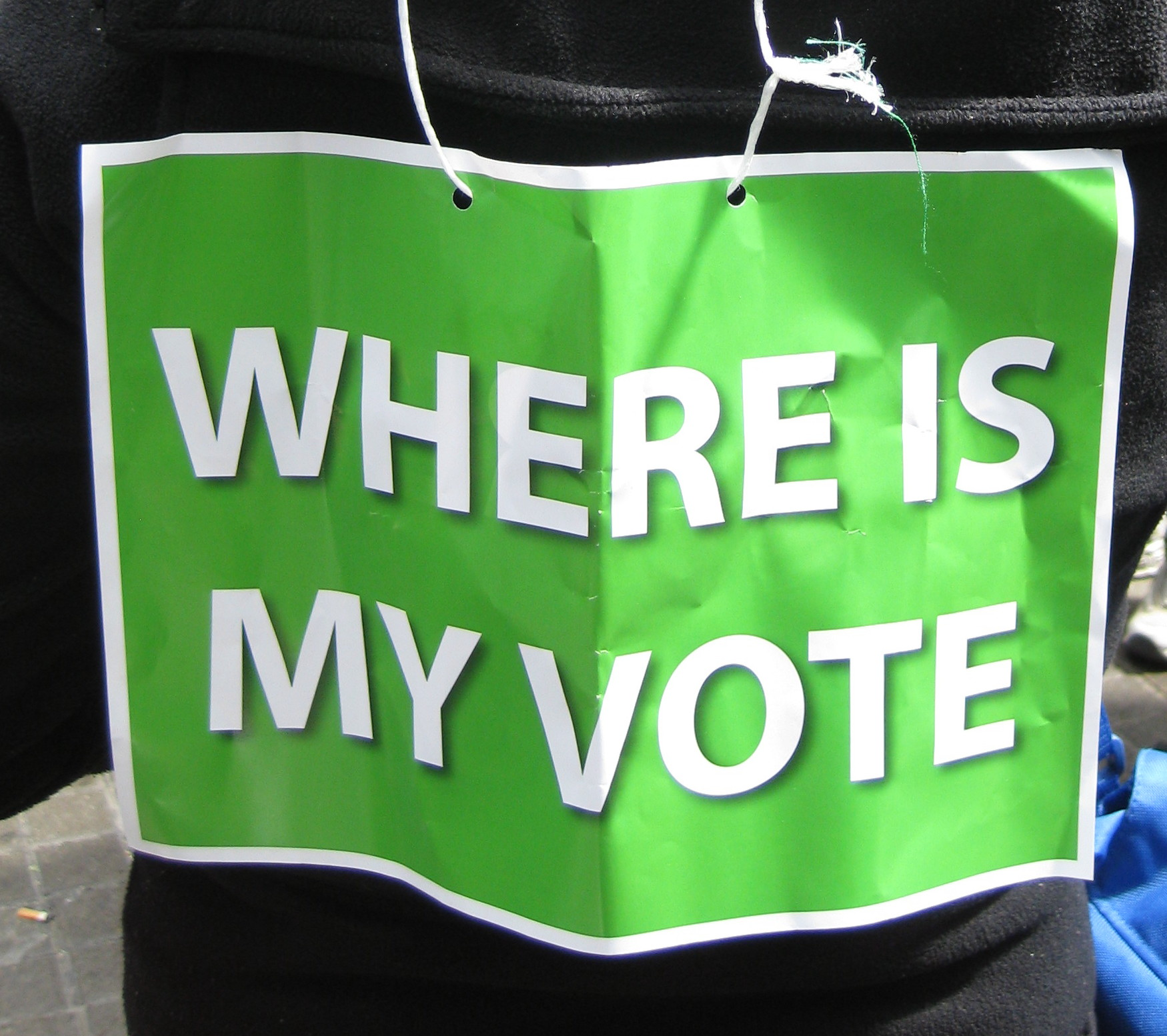
The motto in Germany

Handala, coming and watching the Iranian Green Movement, has become a web mascot.

Where is my vote? (Persian: رأی من کجاست؟, romanized: ra'y-e-man kojāst?) is a motto which was used during the protests. The Iranian government, headed by President Mahmoud Ahmadinejad, released results claiming a two-thirds majority. However, Mousavi had already claimed victory before the vote count was done and supporters of Mousavi and Karroubi accused the government of rigging the votes.

In the aftermath of the election, protests increased and several massive protests were held around the country by the people. The government arrested a large number of the protesters and several were killed by the police and governmental militia forces.

Even though the Iranian government didn’t allow any form of gathering by opposition-supporters in Tehran and across the country, significantly slowed down internet access and censored any form of media agreeing with the opposition, hundreds of thousands of Iranians chanted this motto, defying the law and challenging the Islamic Republic.

== Development of the Green Movement ==
The Green Movement spread throughout Iran as a non-violent protest movement, bringing about hope of more democratization. Protests lasted all through the fall of 2009, with big events happening on national holidays. On Quds Day (18 September), the anniversary of the US Embassy takeover (4 November), National Students Day (7 December) and the day of Grand Ayatollah Montazeri's death (19 December) there were turnouts of thousands of people. On the holy day of Ashura (7 December), the protests turned more violent as hundreds of thousands took to the streets once again, the highest turnout since June, and clashed with state security forces. Hundreds of people were arrested and at least 15 people died. Among them was the 35 year-old nephew of Mir-Hossein Mousavi, Seyed Ali Mousavi.

Within a year, the Green Movement had trouble with retaining its relevance. The number of public demonstrations started to decrease because of the harsh oppression by the state. Security forces attacked protesters in the streets and imprisoned activists as well as politicians. Mousavi and Karroubi were placed under house arrest in 2010, which created even more difficulties for the Green Movement to stay organized.

Access to the Internet and social media as well as the possibility to send text messages was regularly restricted by the government, making it difficult for further protests to materialize. The movement later became less confrontational in an effort to influence the next presidential elections and several groups linked to the Green Movement supported the campaign of Hassan Rouhani in 2014. Following his victory, slogans and symbols that emerged during the protests in 2009 were used again by his supporters.

== The Green Path of Hope ==
Mousavi and other reformist leaders are now working in peaceful and legal methods to widen the influence of their reforms. They have set up a new coalition named "The Green Path of Hope". Iranian political parties and movements need to be authorized by the Interior Ministry. Mousavi neither recognizes the current government as legitimate nor is likely to receive permission; so, the movement was named a "path" in order to bypass this law.

The Green Path of Hope claims it seeks to continue protests against Ahmadinejad's presidency following lawful and peaceful methods, and the full execution of the constitution, as Mousavi says:

"You can't follow some parts of the constitution and throw the rest into a bin."

According to organization officials, the movement encompasses numerous political parties, NGO's and social networks. The "Green Path" has six main members of the central council, who are connected to reformist parties, NGOs, and social networks. The main body consists of ordinary protesters. The strategy is to connect existent pressures and issues in society in a social network, and to therefore lead protests in a lawful manner. The goals of the organization are stated as follows:

"During the election, our mottos supported and remained in the framework of the constitution; today we are devoted to those slogans. We believe that if the people's demands were treated fairly, instead of being distorted by the media and linked to foreigners, and the government promoted truth by fair criticism, our mottos could satisfy the public."

== Iran national football team ==
During Iran's final game of the 2010 FIFA World Cup qualifiers against South Korea in Seoul on 17 June 2009, seven members of the team, Javad Nekounam, Ali Karimi, Hossein Kaebi, Masoud Shojaei, Mohammad Nosrati, Vahid Hashemian, and captain Mehdi Mahdavikia allegedly wore green wristbands in support of the Iranian Green Movement during the 2009 Iranian election protests. However green was one of the colors of their uniform, which also had green shirt logos. Initially it was reported that all seven players were banned for life by the Iranian Football Federation, but state-run media claimed that all seven had "retired". On 24 June 2009, FIFA wrote to Iran's Football Federation asking for clarification on the situation. The Iranian Football Federation replied that no disciplinary action has been taken against any player.

== See also ==
- 2009–10 Iranian election protests
- 2011–12 Iranian protests
- 2017–18 Iranian protests
- 2019–20 Iranian protests
- Killing of Neda Agha-Soltan
- Mahsa Amini protests
