= 2009 Iran poll protests trial =

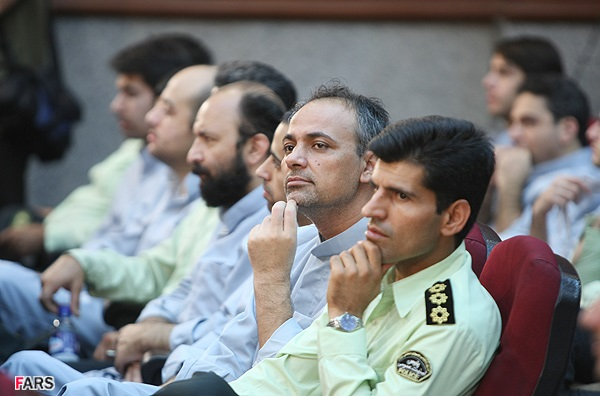
Ahmad Zeidabadi and Javad Emam and others, during the trial

2009 Iran poll protests trial refers to a series of trials conducted after 2009 Iranian presidential election. Over 140 defendants, including prominent politicians, academics and writers, were put on trial for participating in the 2009 Iranian election protests. The defendants were accused of orchestrating "colour revolution" in Iran, and "exposing cases of violations of human rights." The trials were widely condemned by world leaders both in Iran and worldwide as a "show trial" with coerced confessions.

== Accused ==
On August 1, 2009 110 people were put on trial, including prominent reformists, journalists and writers. Among them were former Vice president Mohammad Ali Abtahi, former government spokesman Abdollah Ramezanzadeh, former Deputy Speaker of the Parliament and Industry Minister Behzad Nabavi, reformist lawmaker Ali Tajernia, Shahaboddin Tabatabaei, journalist Ahmad Zeidabadi, and others. Other people put on trial include French Embassy employee, Nazak Afshar, nine British Embassy employees, including the Iranian-American scholar Kian Tajbakhsh, Hossein Rassam, Newsweek correspondent Maziar Bahari, and French academic Clotilde Reiss. On August 16, 25 more defendants were added to the trial.

Throughout the trials, family members of the defendants and others gathered in front of the court to condemn the trial. Witnesses reported that riot police attacked the protesters outside the court. The wife of detained reformist lawmaker Ali Tajernia was arrested while outside the court.

On August 28, President Ahmadinejad called on judiciary officials to "decisively" and "mercilessly" prosecute those "who organized, incited and pursued the plans of the enemies," remarks called "clearly aimed at Mir Hussein Moussavi, Mehdi Karroubi, Mohammad Khatami, and Ali Akbar Hashemi Rafsanjani.

== Charges and confessions ==
The charges included "rioting", "vandalism" and "acting against national security", "disturbing public order," having ties with counter-revolutionary groups according to official sources.

In a press conference shown on state television several of the defendants – Abtahi, Kian Tajbakhsh, Maziar Bahari – made confessions and withdrew charges against the election results that some of them had made earlier. Critics of the prosecution and the confessions by the accused, such as Pamela Kilpadi, say the confessions, "have been forced under duress from (people) being held in an undisclosed location without access to a lawyer, family, or friends, in violation of the human rights treaties to which Iran is supposedly a signatory," Prosecutors have warned against questioning the legitimacy of the trial, threatening to prosecute doubters. The prosecutor read an indictment on August 8, 2009, that accused United States and Britain of stoking the unrest in an attempt to create a "soft overthrow" of the Iranian government.

== Prosecution ==
The prosecution is led by Saeed Mortazavi, the Prosecutor General of Tehran, who has been called a "hardliner" for his role in the death of Iranian-Canadian photojournalist Zahra Kazemi, and the shutting down of 60 pro-reform newspapers. The sentences for the charges range from a short imprisonment to capital punishment.

=== Complaints about access and rights ===
According to journalist Borzou Daragahi, "only reporters with news organizations controlled by Ahmadinejad or his loyalists were granted access to the courtroom."

Saleh Nikbakht, who represents some of the most prominent defendants, has complained of being sidelined from the trial. He told Radio Farda

"I have repeatedly notified the judiciary that I have agreed to represent the defendants at their request, but I was never granted permission to see the detainees and I wasn't notified about today's trial. ... I first heard about the trial today at 11:30 a.m. on television. When I went there, the doors were closed and they did not let me in."

The families of the detained have also complained about the lack of openness in the trial. According to the website Norooznews.ir in a letter to judiciary chief Sadiq Larijani they said

"The lawyers are not even informed of where the hearings are held, nor have they studied the dossiers, ... We ask you, as Iran's top judge, to bring the ongoing judicial case back on the right track to keep the judiciary from losing more face."

=== Sentences ===
So far, five people have received death sentences for their parts in the protest.

Two people were convicted for being members of a monarchist group and a third was convicted for his alleged ties to a terrorist group and for links to the People's Mujahedin of Iran. The other two were convicted of ties to armed opposition groups.

Iran's former vice president Mohammad Ali Abtahi was sentenced to six years in prison for taking part in the protests.

== Prisoner abuse ==
Opposition leaders have claimed that the prisoners have been tortured and raped in prison. UN human rights experts, opposition leaders, and world leaders condemned the abuse, which has been compared to Iraq's Abu Ghraib prison.

Former Prime Minister and presidential candidate Mir Hossein Mousavi has called the treatment of prisoners on trial "medieval torture". Former chairman of Iranian parliament Mehdi Karroubi has stated that male and female prisoners have been raped in the prison and their genitals torn. In a letter to the head of Assembly of Experts he asked the head of the assembly to investigate abuses. Amnesty International's secretary general has also called for an investigation into allegations of torture and rape in detention. Iran's police chief, Gen. Ismail Ahmadi Moghaddam, acknowledged that the prisoners had been abused and raped.

Ali Larijani, Iran's parliament speaker, has denied that prisoners were abused. In response to denials, several journalists and activists who were detained in the prisons, reported their own personal experience. On August 16, 2009, Fereshteh Ghazi, in an article in Rooz, wrote about her time in prison, describing the torture and sexual violence in Iranian prisons.

Additionally, several of the prisoners died while in prison. Authorities claimed that they had "pre-existing conditions" that led to their deaths, however, examining of the bodies would show signs of torture and broken bones. At least three of the detained protesters have died while in prison at the Kahrizak detention center. One prisoner, 24-year-old Amir Javadifar was clubbed by so badly that he was taken to a hospital and treated before being taken to Evin Prison. He would die while in prison and his father was later called to collect his corpse. Medical reports on his body would show that he had been beaten, had several broken bones and his toenails had been pulled out. Another detainee, Amir Hossein Tufanian, who was in the Kahrizak detention center died while there. After his death, police allegedly demanded that his family pay thousands of dollars for his body. When the family protested that they had no money, they were told they could have it for free if they did not discuss it to anyone. Examinations would show that he had been tortured and had two broken arms. The mysterious death of an Iranian prison doctor on November 10, 2009, continued to raise suspicions. The doctor, Dr. Ramin Pourandarjani, was the only doctor serving at the Kahrizak detention center. He came under scrutiny of the Iranian government when he refused to change the death certificate of Mohsen Rouhalamini, a protester detained at Kahrizakt, to meningitis rather than from torture and beatings. Conflicting reports from Iranian authorities regarding Dr. Pourandarjani's death led to massive outcries from opposition leaders.

Many prisoners were raped while detained. In Tehran, at least 37 men and women claim to have been raped by their jailers. Doctors' reports say that two males, aged 17 and 22, died as a result of internal bleeding from being raped.

There is some question as to the effectiveness of the confessions to turn public opinion in Iran. One observer has stated that "so far," the trials "have failed to accrue" the "fearsome power" of the Moscow show trials or earlier public confessions of Iranian secular leftists and MeK guerrillas in 1982, due to broad public support for the prisoners' cause and the "subversive" power of parodies and criticism of the trials on the Internet.

On November 28, 2018 guards in Khoy female prison, north west of Iran attacked inmate Zeynab Jalalian and confiscated all her belongings. She was arrested in February 2007.

== International response ==
Human rights activists and Iranian intellectuals wrote a letter to the United Nations High Commissioner for Human Rights, Navanethem Pillay calling the trials "crimes against humanity."

U.S. Secretary of State Hillary Clinton called the trials a "sign of weakness" and that it shows Iran "is afraid of its own people" in an interview with CNN. British Foreign Secretary David Miliband condemned the trial and said that accusing British Embassy staff of stoking the unrest "only brings further discredit to the Iranian regime."

The Swedish Presidency of the European Union expressed concern over the trial and demanded that the prisoners be released promptly, saying "The Presidency reiterates that actions against one EU country — citizen or embassy staff — is considered an action against all of EU, and will be treated accordingly."

On September 24, 2009, demonstrators from around the world gathered in New York City to protest against Ahmadinejad's speech to world leaders at the U.N. General Assembly.

== See also ==
- 2009 Iranian election protests
- Hovyiat (TV series)
- Show trial
