= Zahra's Paradise =

Iranian webcomic and graphic novel

- The cover to First Second's hardcover edition of Zahra's Paradise
- Author: Amir Soltani
- Illustrator: Khalil
- Cover artist: Khalil
- Language: English, French, Dutch, Italian, Spanish, German, Finnish, Korean, Portuguese, Turkish, Persian, Arabic
- Subject: 2009–10 Iranian election protests
- Genre: Comics, Politics
- Publisher: ZahrasParadise.com (webcomic); First Second Books (English)
- Publication date: 2010–2011 (webcomic); 2011 (book)
- Publication place: United States
- English publication date: 2011
- Media type: Webcomic, hardcover, paperback
- Pages: 272
- ISBN: 978-1596436428
- OCLC: 692291009

Zahra's Paradise (Persian: بهشت زهرا Behesht-e Zahra) is a webcomic and graphic novel by Amir Soltani and Khalil set in modern Iran. It has been described as a political webcomic dealing with real-time events. Its story follows a mother searching for her son, who disappeared around the time of Iran's 2009 elections. Serialized online beginning in early 2010, Zahra's Paradise was published in hardcover format in 2011 and has received numerous positive reviews in mainstream press and blogs.

== Publication history ==
Zahra's Paradise was conceived by a Persian writer (Amir Soltani), an Arab artist ("Khalil"), and a Jewish editor, who chose anonymity for political reasons. Two of them are Iranian expatriates, and want to protect their families in Iran from repressions by the Iranian government. Writer Soltani describes himself as "a human rights activist, journalist and documentary filmmaker."

The first episode of Zahra's Paradise webcomic was published on 19 February 2010. Thereafter, it was published three times a week in black-and-white strips. As episodes were being published, they were simultaneously translated into Persian, Arabic, Dutch, French, Spanish, and Italian. Ultimately, the webcomic was translated into 16 languages.

An English-language hardcover print edition was published by First Second Books on September 13, 2011. Foreign language editions have subsequently been published by Casterman (in French and Dutch), Rizzoli Lizard (in Italian), Norma Editorial (in Spanish), Knesebeck (in German), LIKE (in Finnish), Darun (in Korean), Leya (in Portuguese), Pegasus Yayınları (in Turkish), vote4zahra.org (in Persian), and Dar Al-Tanweer (in Arabic).

== Plot ==
The story takes place in the aftermath of the disputed Iran's 2009 elections. It recounts a search for Mehdi, a young activist who has vanished in their aftermath, likely abducted by the government's secret police. The search is carried out by his mother (the titular Zahra), his brother (a blogger), and their friends.

"Zahra's Paradise" is also the English name of Behesht-e Zahra, the largest cemetery in Iran, located in Tehran. The comic's title purposefully draws inspiration from that place, a place of rest for many Iranians from all paths of life, including both the supporters and opponents of the Iranian revolution and the current Iranian government.

The novel's characters echo real figures, such as Mohsen Rouholamini, a 25-year-old who was reported to have died of prison abuse in 2009, and Sohrab Aarabi, the 19-year-old who was gunned down in the protests, both of whom, like Neda Agha-Soltan, were buried in Behesht-e Zahra. It's also reminiscent of the story of Hossein Derakhshan, the Iranian-Canadian who helped spark the Iranian blogging movement, before voluntarily returning to his homeland in 2008, only to be imprisoned indefinitely. Another name of relevance is that of the Canadian-Iranian journalist Zahra Kazemi, known for her investigations into missing people in Iran, who was beaten to death in an Iranian prison in 2003.

== Reception ==
Zahra's Paradise has received a wide and positive reception; a review in The Independent noted that "the webcomic is garnering enthusiastic mentions across the mainstream media and ... varied blogs." Its themes and style have been compared to that of Marjane Satrapi's Persepolis, a graphic novel that was adapted into an animated film, was a recipient of numerous awards and was nominated for an Academy Award in 2007. Another review compared Zahra's Paradise to the acclaimed nonfiction graphic novels Joe Sacco's Palestine and Art Spiegelman's Maus.

The webcomic was nominated for a 2012 Eisner Award in the Best Digital Comic category. It was named a YALSA Great Graphic Novel for Teens, Graphic Novel Reporter's Best Graphic Novel of the Year and Great Graphic Novel of Fall 2011, and one of Publishers Weekly Best Children's Books of the Year. An Arabic translation was published by Dar Al-Tanweer in Cairo in 2013. A translation into Persian also exists; it was released as a PDF, but not printed.

== Book banning controversy ==
The book was banned from Santa Rosa County District Schools, Florida, and North Kansas City Schools, Rockwood School District, and Webster Groves School District, Missouri. It was temporarily banned (pending investigation) in Escambia County Public Schools, Florida.

== See also ==
- 2009–10 Iranian election protests
- Human rights in Iran
- Ministry of Intelligence and National Security (Iran)
