= Mohammad Mokhtari (protester) =

- محمد مختاری
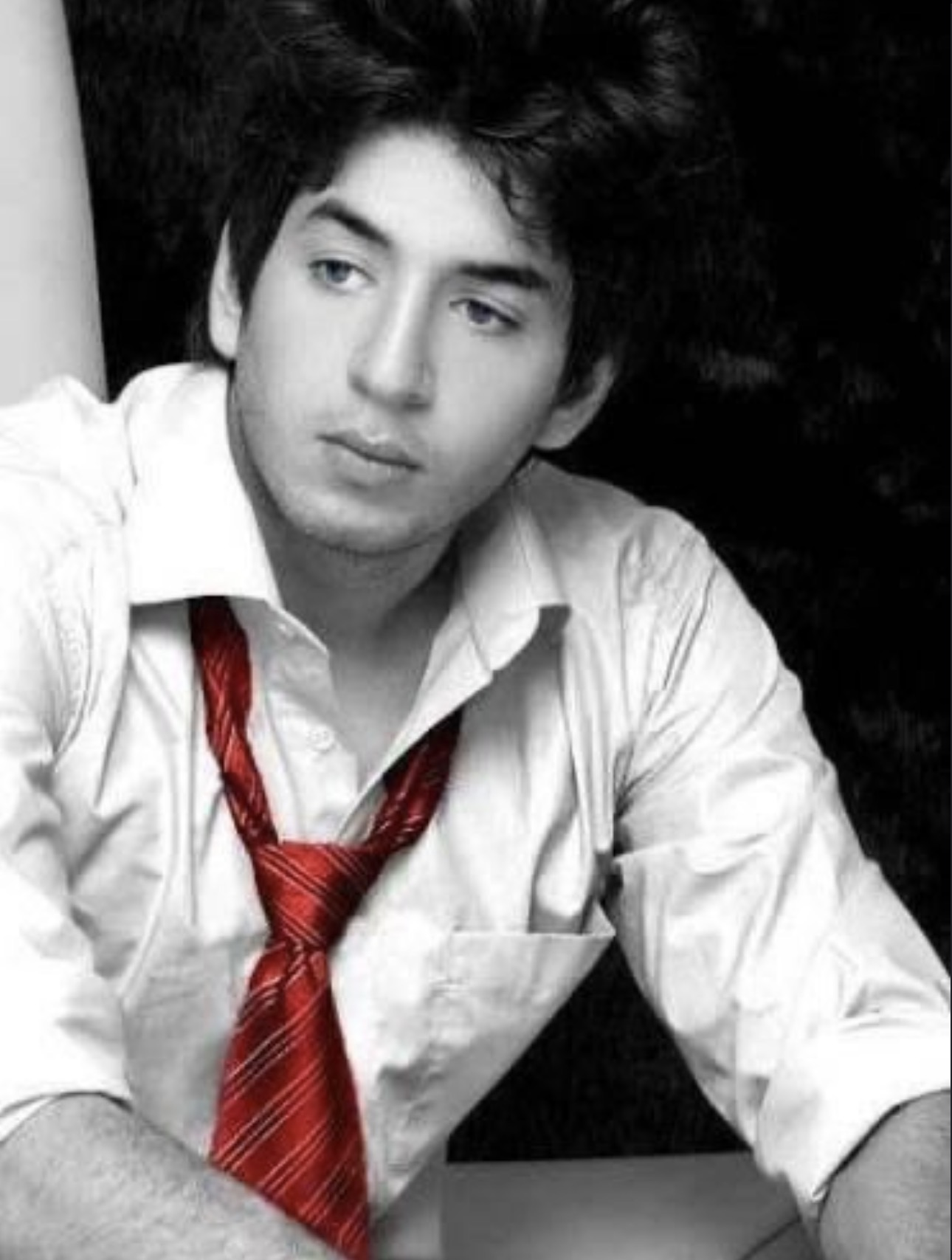
- Born: 10 September 1989; Tehran, Iran
- Died: 14 Feb 2011 (aged 21); Intersection of Tousi Street and Towhid Street. Tehran, Iran; 35.703784°N 51.377839°E
- Cause of death: Gunshot wound
- Resting place: Behesht-e Zahrā cemetery, southern Tehran
- Education: Islamic Azad University (final semester of mining engineering) in Shahrood.
- Known for: Death during the 2011 Iranian protests

Mohammad Mokhtari (Persian: محمد مختاری) (10 September 1989 – 15 February 2011) was an Iranian university student fatally wounded by a gunshot fired by the forces of the Islamic Regime on the 14 February 2011 protests in Tehran. He died the next day, while hospitalized. Like Sane Jaleh, the regime tried to claim him as a Basiji, a member of the militia force of the regime always active in suppressing popular uprisings of the Iranian people.

== Early life ==
Mohammad reportedly "came from a large middle-class family, and loved sports". He was attending Azad University in Shahrood.

His favorite musical instrument was the piano and his favorite football player was Lionel Messi of the Argentina team.

== Killing and subsequent efforts to hijack his name ==
According to eyewitnesses, Mokhtari was shot in middle of his forehead, he briefly fell to the ground. He died in the hospital the next day. On the eve of the first anniversary of his murder, his father did an interview, in which, he unveiled the efforts of the regime to brand Mohammad as a Basiji. During his funeral, they sent one of their agents to play the role of his mother for the camera and try to pretend Mohammad was a supporter of the regime, but later on, they found out about Mohammad's Facebook posts in which he invited his followers to rise against the regime. Three days before his death, Mokhtari wrote on his Facebook wall, "God, give me death by standing for it's better than a life of sitting under oppression."

== Aftermath ==
On February 20 "thousands took to the streets of Iran's largest cities to commemorate the deaths" of the two protesters. According to Human Rights Watch, during a protest in the city of Shiraz at least one other student demonstrator was killed, Hamed Nour-Mohammadi. Nour-Mohammadi was "killed by security forces" while "trying to escape their attacks".

== See also ==
- Sane Jaleh
- Neda Agha-Soltan
- Zahra Kazemi
- Zahra Bani Yaghoub
- Sohrab Arabi
- 2011 Iranian protests
