= Borhan Mansournia =

- بُرهان منصورنیا
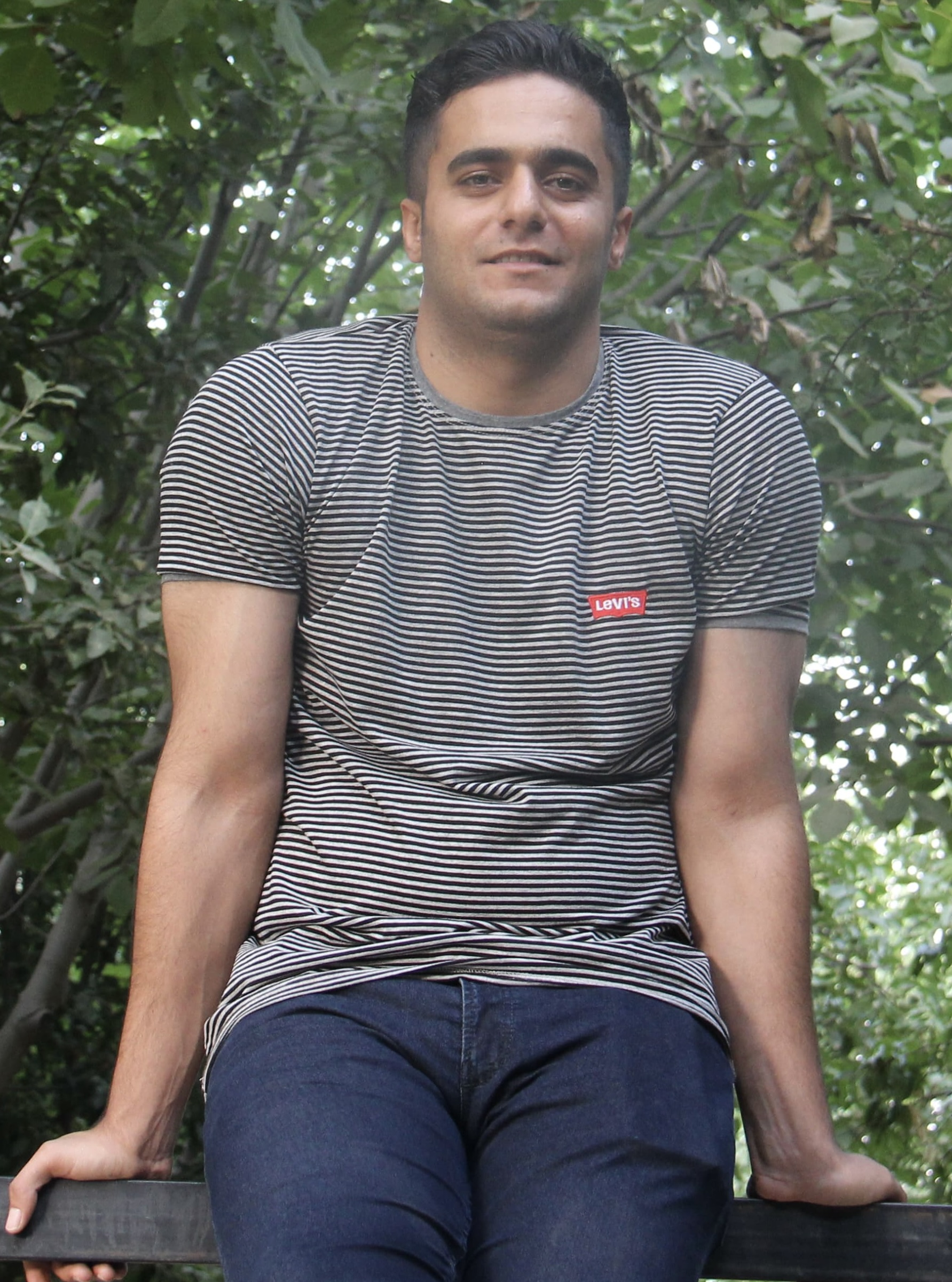
- Borhan Mansournia, c. August 2019
- Pronunciation: Borhān Mansūrniyā
- Born: 22 July 1991; Marivan, Kurdistan Province, Iran
- Died: 18 November 2019 (aged 28); Kermanshah, Kermanshah Province, Iran
- Cause of death: Gunshot wound to the abdomen
- Resting place: بهشت مصطفی (Behesht-e Mostafa) Cemetery, Marivan, Kurdistan Province, Iran
- Education: Doctor of Veterinary Medicine (DVM)
- Alma mater: University of Urmia
- Movement: Bloody Aban (2019-2020 Iranian Protests)

Borhan Mansournia (Persian: بُرهان منصورنیا; Borhān Mansūrniyā; 22 July 1991 – 18 November 2019) was a 28 year old Kurdish veterinarian, serving his mandatory military service in the city of Kermanshah, in the west of Iran. Mansournia suffered a gunshot wound to his abdomen during the 2019–2020 Iranian protests, also known as "Bloody Aban" (the month of Aban in the Persian Solar Hijri calendar corresponds with November in the Gregorian calendar).

Mansournia's death garnered attention after his family took to social media to denounced attempts by the authorities to declare Mansournia a "martyr", having been killed while on duty serving the Islamic Republic in Iran.

== Life ==
Borhan Mansournia was born on 22 July 1991 in Marivan, Kurdistan Province, Iran. Like many young men, he enjoyed football and was a supporter of AC Milan and Persepolis F.C football teams. Mansournia was an avid gamer, and was reputed to be the first person in Marivan to finish Super Mario Bros. He enjoyed the arts, including novels by Dostoevsky and cinema, including works of Iranian directors such as Bahman Ghobadi and Abbas Kiarostami, and international works of Christopher Nolan, Andrei Tarkovsky, Theor Angelopoulos, Krzysztof Kieślowski and Akira Kurosawa. In the hospital in his final moments, he requested to watch Trilogy: The Weeping Meadow.

Mansournia had studied at the University of Urmia where he had earned a Doctor of Veterinary Medicine (DVM) in November 2018. He had then enlisted to complete his compulsory military service after defending his thesis in March 2019, and completed his training in Arak, Markazi Province, after which had been assigned to the police force in Kermanshah.

Mansournia was also a volunteer with the Chya Green Association (Persian: انجمن سبز چیا), an organization of volunteer firefighters who respond to forest fires and attempt to protect the environment. Activists working for this organization have often been subject to persecution by authorities.

== Death ==
=== Bloody November (Aban) Protests ===
Instigated by the 50–200 percent increase in fuel prices in Iran,^{[} November 2019 saw many people taking to the streets in anti-government protests, with protesters calling for the overthrow of the regime and its leader, Ali Khamenei. The government forces response included the shutting down of the internet, mass arrests and violence against protesters, including the use of live immunition against unarmed protesters.

=== The Death of Borhan Mansournia ===
On 16 November 2019, Mansournia had been leaving his brother's home in Dowlatabad, Kermanshah on foot when he entered an area where protesters had gathered and were moving toward a police station. According to information given by the family to Center for Human Rights in Iran, as the crowd neared the police station, they were met with heavy gunfire. As the gunfire from the police against the unarmed protesters began, the crowd panicked and many started to run, Mansournia was hit in the back as he ran with the crowd. In the chaos, Abdolreza Shirzadi and Sajjad Baqeri were also killed.

Mansournia's was admitted in Taleghani Hospital after being refused by Farabi Hospital in Kermanshah. In hospital, he was operated on for four and a half hours, the bullet having caused major damage to his internal organs. Following the operation, Mansournia was left in a bed in the hallway with nearly two dozen others who had been injured in protests. After having eventually been moved to the intensive care unit, on Monday afternoon 18 November 2019, Mansournia's condition deteriorated and he lost consciousness and was declared dead that night.

== Aftermath ==
Mansournia's family were not able to immediately claim the body for burial, they were forced to pay a US$1,328 (5.6million Tomans) bill as they were denied insurance coverage and the government forces had them sign a statement that they would not publicly speak about Mansournia's death (included public interviews).

Following the burial, the family was contacted by authorities who offered the family money in exchange for their signature on paperwork to state that Mansournia had been killed by protesters while working for the police, making him a "martyr" of the Islamic Republic. This process would also involve state funded media doing interviews with members of Mansournia's family in which they would state that he had died in service of the Islamic Republic. This is a common practice of the regime, for example in the death of student Sane Jaleh. Mansournia had been conscious for a few hours between being operated on and his deterioration and was able to tell his family what had happened. The family vehemently denied to comply and publicly announced that their son was killed by regime forces. They attempted to file a claim against the police force for the wrongful death of Mansournia, however, this process involved the need for an autopsy, their request for this was denied. Witnesses who had seen the body of Mansournia claim that the body had been tampered with in an attempt to conceal cause of death.

For their part in denial of the regime's narrative, Mansournia's family were the subject of multiple threats and harassment, including arbitrary detainment. Mansournia's older brother, Soran Mansournia, had been summoned for questioning 18 times in the 12 months following his death.

In July 2020 Mansournia's friends and family had gathered at his grave to commemorate his birthday. This ceremony was targeted by plainclothes officers who beat mourners and seized personal devices and cellphones at gunpoint.

Mansournia's family, along with the families of many other protesters killed in the 2019 protests continue to advocate for justice. In June 2023 they formed Aban Families for Justice, a group which has been subject to smear campaigns by state-funded media.

== In Literature and Media ==
- آبان شد... (“Aban Came…”), 2023, a short-story collection published in the Netherlands, includes “Borhan-e Aban,” a magical-realist narrative of his final hours.
- Episode 75 of the Persian-language podcast Radio Marz (March 2025) featured Mansournia's brother and families of other victims.
