= Hassan Zare Dehnavi =

Iranian judge and prosecutor (1956–2020)

Hassan Zare Dehnavi, known as Judge Haddad or Hassan Haddad (Tehran, 1956 – 28 October 2020) was an Iranian judge and prosecutor. He was the Deputy Prosecutor for Security Affairs of the Tehran Public and Revolutionary Prosecutor's Office of the Iranian Revolutionary Court. He was accused of multiple human rights violations against dissenters of the Iranian regime during his career; according to Radio Farda, he had a long history of human rights abuses, convictions of many political and civil activists, and his violent and illegal treatment of defendants.

== Biography ==
Dehnavi was born into a Yazidi family in 1956, and started his career in the Iranian judiciary in 1981, shortly after the Iranian revolution, acting as an interrogator and torturer at Evin Prison and dealing with political activists and "security cases" under Asadollah Lajevardi. According to former Evin prisoner Iraj Mesdaghi, Dehnavi personally participated in executions of prisoners to prove his devotion to the regime; after the 1988 massacres, however, he was relieved of his duties (according to both Mesdaghi and former firing squad member Mohammad Ali Sarlak, for corruption). He was then tasked with inspecting confiscated property for the Execution of Imam Khomeini's Order, but was removed from this position as well for financial misconduct.

In the following years, Dehnavi obtained a degree in Islamic law, and in the late 1990s re-entered the Iranian judiciary system, gradually rising to the rank of prosecutor and judge by the early 2000s. He was put in charge of Branch 26 of the Revolutionary Court, initially dealing with drug and antiquities traffickers, but being gradually an increasing number of politically sensitive cases, until he became deputy prosecutor for security affairs and right-hand man of Prosecutor General of Tehran Saeed Mortazavi in 2006.

From 2000 to 2005, as a judge at the Tehran revolutionary court's 26th chamber from 2000 to 2005, he sentenced several journalists to long prison terms. Among journalists and activists tried by him were Akbar Ganji, Shiva Nazar Ahari, Ezzatollah Sahabi, Fereshteh Ghazi, Amir Farshad Ebrahimi, and a number of students from the Office for Strengthening Unity. Kianush Sanjari published an open letter accusing Dehnavi of presiding over torture and mistreatment of prisoners, Ali Afshari cited Dehnavi as "a clear example of the non-independence of the judiciary from the security services", and Reza Alijani stated that "...intelligence services had just begun appointing puppet judges to the Revolutionary Courts: usually select individuals with an array of personal weaknesses, be they moral, financial or political. Haddad was said to have issues in all these areas, making him a completely obedient figure. Our interrogators said on several occasions that the judge was 'useless', and when we told Haddad what they had said, he didn't even react." Among procedural violations ascribed to him were prolonged solitary confinement, denied access to family and to a lawyer, and physical and psychological torture.

In May 2007, shortly after the announcement of the dissolution of the Islamic Association of Amirkabir University by the university president and the demolition of its building, student publications were distributed throughout the university, in which Khamenei's caricature was published and criticized. Eight members of the Islamic Association were arrested for these publications, and three students were sentenced to prison terms. The students denied that the publications had been published by them and asserted that there was evidence that the logo of the student publications had been forged, but the Ministry of Science, the Ministry of Information and the judiciary insisted that the students had violated the law. Dehnavi was the judge who handled this case, and upheld the detention of the students; he was accused of having the prisoners tortured to obtain a confession.

Also in 2007, Dehnavi was involved in the imprisonment of Iranian-American academic Haleh Esfandiari, detained for nearly three months in Evin Prison under accusation of "endangering national security through propaganda against the system and espionage for foreigners".

In April 2009 Dehnavi was involved in the trial of American journalist Roxana Saberi, whom he charged with espionage. Saberi spent three months in Evin prison and was sentenced to eight years' imprisonment, but was released in May 2009.

As judge in Branch 26 of the Revolutionary Court of Tehran, he handled many cases of detainees after the 2009 Iranian election protests and repeatedly threatened the families of the accused to remain silent. Along with prosecutor Mortazavi, he ordered a number of protesters to be arrested and sent to Kahrizak Detention Center, where they were tortured and in some cases murdered. In 2013 Dehnavi was convicted for the Kahrizak incidents alongside Mortazavi and Ali Akbar Heidarifard, another judge who ordered the protesters to be transferred to Kahrizak Detention Center; after a trial held behind closed doors, all three were sentenced by Branch 76 of the Criminal Court of Tehran to permanent suspension from judicial service and five years' suspension from government service on charges of "illegal participation in detention". In 2014, however, Branch 9 of the Supreme Court of Iran reduced Dehnavi's suspension from judicial service to six years, and his suspension from government service to two years.

Dehnavi was one of 32 Iranian officials who on April 13, 2011, were banned from entering the European Union, for their role in widespread and grave violations of Iranian citizens' rights. An order was also issued to seize all the assets of these officials in Europe.

In 2014 Dehnavi was among six Iranian judges accused by human rights organisations of leading a crackdown on journalists and political activists, acting under the influence of the regime's intelligence and security apparatus; "losing their judicial impartiality and overseeing miscarriages of justice in trials in which scores of journalists, lawyers, political activists and members of Iran's ethnic and religious minorities have been condemned to lengthy prison terms, lashes and even execution... common violations by the judges include holding trials behind closed doors, lasting only a few minutes and without essential legal procedures, intimidating defendants, breaching judicial independence by acting as prosecutors themselves and depriving prisoners of access to lawyers".

On 31 October 2020, it was announced that Dehnavi had died of COVID-19 at Gandhi Hospital in Tehran on 28 October. He was 64 years old at the time of his death.
