= Sane Jaleh =

Iranian student

- Born: May 22, 1985; Paveh, Iran
- Died: February 14, 2011 (aged 25); Tehran, Iran
- Cause of death: Shooting
- Resting place: Kermanshah
- Education: University of Arts
- Known for: being shot dead during the 2011 Iranian protests

Sane Jaleh (Persian: صانع ژاله, Sāne jāle) also Sanea Jaleh, Saneh Jaleh, or Sani Zhaleh (May 22, 1985 – February 14, 2011) was an Iranian student at the University of Arts. He was one of two students shot dead during the February 14, 2011 demonstrations in support of Egyptians and Tunisians for ousting Presidents Hosni Mubarak and Ben Ali, in Tehran, Iran. According to news reports, "rival groups" of pro- and anti-Islamic government protesters "both claim" him and the other slain protester (Mohammad Mokhtari) "as one of their supporters."

== Background ==
Sane Jaleh was born in Paveh in Kermanshah Province in 1985 and was a Kurdish Hewrami Iranian and Sunni Muslim. At the time of his death he was in his third year of studies in the field of dramatic arts at the Department of Cinema and Theater at the University of Arts, Tehran.

== Killing and controversy ==
=== Official version ===
On Tuesday February 15, the day after his killing, the Iranian "culture ministry's security chief" reported his death and stated that he was a "government supporter." Other pro-government news media sources reported he was a "Basij militia member" (a group of "plain clothes" Islamic militants noted for their attacks on opposition demonstrators with batons, metal chains and firearms) "shot by agents provocateurs controlled by various opposition groups". Pro-government sources also alleged he was killed by the opposition group Mojahedin Khalgh. On Wednesday his funeral was held with a funeral process starting at Tehran University where the state-run IRIB reported clashes by marchers with "the sedition movement," i.e. opposition. Hossein Shariatmadari, the editor of Kayhan newspaper (which is under the supervision of the Office of the Supreme Leader), explained Jaleh's involvement in the opposition protest by asserting he was a spy for Kayhan newspaper, a claim considered "bizarre" by some.

=== Disputes with official version ===
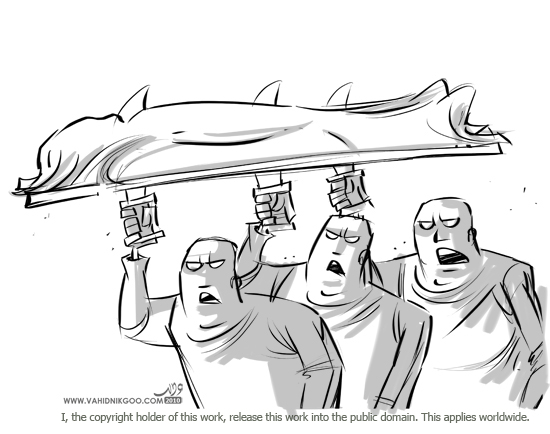
An Iranian Cartoon about his Funeral

"Friends and classmates" of Jaleh, have responded with a "counteroffensive" denying he was either a member of the Basij or a supporter of the government. Kalameh website has stated that Jaleh was a member of Mir-Hossein Mousavi's election campaign team; Saham News Website has published a picture with Ayatollah Montazeri and claims that one of the men in the picture is Sane Jaleh. Jaleh's alleged pro-regime outlook also did not align with his publishing of "at least one short story" in a magazine (Azma) "accused in some quarters of being a part of the "soft war" against the Islamic Republic"; his appearance in a short film (A Brick in the Wall) currently banned by the Iranian regime due to its dissident contents; and his Kurdish and Sunni background (neither group being known for its support of the Islamic Republic).

According to the source Tehran Bureau, the official version appeared to resemble the "well-orchestrated disinformation operation" employed by the government "to blame anyone but its security forces for the death of Neda Agha Soltan during the unrest of 2009." Suspicion has been cast on official reports of Jaleh's death by the evolution its portrayal of Jaleh first simply as a "devout student," then as a "regime sympathizer," and finally as a "full-fledged Basij militia member". The claim of his membership in the Basij was made in a statement about his death by the president of the Arts University, though in an earlier report of Jaleh's death the head of public relations for the Student Basij was quoted and made no mention of Jaleh's alleged Basij membership.

A photo of Jaleh's alleged Basiji ID was published by Fars News Agency but came under question when a blogger "wrote that the stamp on the photo bore the name of the town of Paveh, but that the back of the card had a postal code for Tehran." The card also "had a higher serial number than those issued two years ago" despite the fact that it was dated for three years ago.

In an interview with Voice of America, Persian, Sane Jaleh's brother stated that the government's allegations are false and without merit. He also said that his family has been put under pressure by the Iranian government to cooperate. He added that Mr. Jaleh's Basiji Identification Card was issued after his death with the help of his cousin, who works for the Ministry of Information. He further added that the regime did not hand over his brother's body to the family and that he is being buried by his murderers. Mr. Jaleh's brother was arrested after his interview with Voice of America, Persian, and is currently in prison in the town of Paveh, in Kermanshah, Iran.

According to the International Campaign for Human Rights in Iran, a Wednesday 16 February funeral procession and memorial service planned for Sane Jaleh by his classmates at the Arts University campus was taken over by the Basij with "about 40 to 50" of Jaleh's classmates being "pushed ... into a corner", and held until they were told to "leave quietly and silently." A few were arrested. The BBC reported that "police forces had blocked all the roads leading to the university" the day of the funeral, "and were only allowing in pro-government supporters."

== Post-funeral ==
On February 20 antigovernment protesters gathered in Tehran and some other parts of Iran to Iran to commemorate the deaths of Jaleh and the other protester (Mohammad Mokhtari) killed on February 14. According to The New York Times, "shops in Mahabad and Sanandaj were closed" after Kurds called for a general strike in response to the death of Jaleh. Yet another protester, Hamed Nour-Mohammadi, was killed on February 20 when "thousands took to the streets of Iran's largest cities", according to Human Rights Watch "to commemorate the deaths of Saneh Jaleh", and Mohammad Mokhtar. Nour-Mohammadi, was killed in Shiraz.

== See also ==
- Mohammad Mokhtari (protester)
- Neda Agha-Soltan
- Zahra Kazemi
- Zahra Bani Yaghoub
- Sohrab Arabi
