= Neda Soltani =

Iranian author

Neda Soltani (Persian: ندا سلطانی; born 1977, in Isfahan) is an Iranian exile. During the 2009 Iranian election protests, she was teaching English at Azad University when her Facebook profile photo was mistakenly published in many articles about the death of the similarly named Neda Agha-Soltan, who was shot and killed during the protests.

As a result, her identity was confused with that of Agha-Soltan, to whom she bore a superficial facial resemblance. She tried vainly removing her photo from the Internet and the media. Claims and counter-claims were made, including claims from the Iranian government that she was the same person as Agha-Soltan, and had faked her death, and others who claimed that she was herself an agent of the Iranian government, impersonating Agha-Soltan to sully her memory.

Within two weeks, she had to flee from Iran to avoid arrest. She was granted asylum in Germany in 2010.

As of 2012, Soltani remains exiled from Iran and is under Germany's asylum.

She has authored a book, My Stolen Face, narrating her story of the incident.
