= Institute for Interreligious Dialogue =

Non-governmental organization

The Institute for Interreligious Dialogue is a non-governmental organization devoted to dialog among religions throughout the world.

The institute was founded in 1998, by vice president of Mr. Mohammad Khatami, Mohammad-Ali Abtahi for promoting Dialogue Among Religions. The academic board of the institute is composed of renowned scholars of Zoroastrianism, Christianity, Islam and Judaism as well as several prominent experts on philosophy of religion, mysticism and Comparative religion.

The institute's library of religions has a collection of more than 4000 titles of professional books of religions in different languages.

== Members and officers ==
Current president of the institute is Mohammad Ali Abtahi, the organizer of Institute and a well-known theologian and former vice president of Iran.

Academic board members: Ali Paya

== See also ==
- Religious intellectualism in Iran
- Iranian culture
- Dariush Shayegan, Iran's pioneering theorist of dialog among cultures
- Peace movement
