= Sohrab Aarabi =

Iranian pro-democracy student

Sohrab Arabi
- Born: February 23, 1990; Iran
- Died: June 15, 2009 (aged 19); Tehran, Iran
- Resting place: Behesht Zahra Cemetery
- Occupation: Student
- Known for: Death in 2009 Iranian election protests

Sohrab Aarabi (also spelled Arabi) (Persian: سهراب اعرابی Sohrāb A'rābī; 23 February 1990 – 15 June 2009) was a 19-year-old Iranian pro-democracy student and victim of political repression in the Islamic Republic of Iran. whose death became a symbol of protests during 2009 post election unrest in Iran.

== Family and background ==
Sohrab was raised in a middle-class Iranian family . His mother, Parvin Fahimi, became an active member of Mothers for Peace following his death.

== Arrest and killing ==
Sohrab disappeared on June 15 during the 2009 presidential election protests. The case attracted significant media attention. Prosecutor Saeed Mortazavi promised that he would work to release Arabi. After a month-long search, Sohrab was found dead from "a gunshot wound to the heart". Other sources mention two bullet wounds – one in the head and one under the heart. The Iranian Judiciary handed the body over to the family.

The exact circumstances in which Arabi was killed remain uncertain. According to one scenario, he died in prison. Others claim he may have been shot in the streets and died later in a hospital or police camp. During his funeral, his mother screamed out loud that he was stabbed in the heart.

Parvin Fahimi, Arabi's mother, disclosed how pictures of between 50 and 60 people of those said to have died, were shown to her after being summoned by the Revolutionary Court, according to The Guardian. Out of the pictures that were shown to Arabi's mother, Sohrab's was the 12th picture, according to ips news. According to NBC News, the official death toll provided by the Iranian Police was that at least 20 protesters and 7 members of the Basij militia were killed during the 2009 post election protests.

== Funeral and aftermath ==
Sohrab Arabi's death was grieved nationwide and influenced the protests similar to the killing of Neda Agha-Soltan. Crowds chanted in defiance of the police as they gathered for the funeral.

On 14 July, former prime minister Mousavi and his wife Zahra Rahnavard visited Sohrab's family and paid tribute to him. Following Mousavi's visit, Mehdi Karroubi, the Chairman of National Confidence Party and a presidential hopeful in 2009 election, also met Sohrab's family and showed solidarity with his relatives. According to Los Angeles Times, it was reported that Iranian intelligence officers went to the funeral before it started, cautioning that any form of protest would lead to detention and further difficulty for the family of Sohrab Arabi.

Sohrab Arabi's death generated fear among several dozen families camping outside Evin prison, trying to learn the fate of loved ones who vanished in post-election turmoil. The spokesman for the International Campaign for Human Rights in Iran said there could be "dozens, or even hundreds" of missing people like Arabi. "They are people who simply went off the radar screen.… There's no confirmation if they are in prison or dead." Also, the human rights group has demanded for an independent investigation into Sohrab Arabi's death, as well as the reason why his family was not notified of his death earlier, according to cnn. The human rights group claims that Arabi was killed during the protest that took place after the elections, according to reuters.

== See also ==
- Neda Agha-Soltan
- Political repression in the Islamic Republic of Iran
- Zahra Kazemi
- Zahra Bani Yaghoub
- Sane Jaleh
