= Death of Ramin Pourandarjani =

Iranian physician (1938–2009)

Ramin Pourandarjani

Ramin Pourandarjani (9 June 1983 – 10 November 2009) was an Iranian physician who examined prisoners wounded and killed during the 2009 Iranian election protests. Pourandarjani was born on 9 June 1983 to a middle class family in a northwestern district of the city of Tabriz. He died under mysterious circumstances on November 10, 2009, at the age of 26. Tehran's public prosecutor Abbas Dowlatabadi said Ramin Pourandarjani died of poisoning from a delivery salad laced with an overdose of blood pressure medication. The findings fueled opposition fears that he was killed because of what he knew. Pourandarjani had worked as a physician at the Kahrizak detention center. Iranian authorities earlier had claimed at various points that Pourandarjani had been injured in a car accident, committed suicide, or died of a heart attack in his sleep at the health center at the police headquarters in Tehran where he worked.

== Kahrizak doctor ==
Pourandarjani was responsible for the medical care of several prisoners believed to have been tortured. One of his patients was Mohsen Ruholamini, a government scientist's son, arrested following his participation in the post-election protests. Ruholamini, who was 25 years old, died in prison in July 2009. The death certificate originally identified Ruholamini's cause of death as multiple blows to the head. A report given to judicial authorities stated that Ruholamini had died of "physical stress, the effects of being held in bad conditions, multiple blows and severe injuries to the body."

Pourandarjani testified before a parliamentary committee investigating misconduct at the Kahrizak jail. This jail was subsequently closed by order of Ayatollah Khamenei, because of the poor conditions there. An investigation was conducted by Iranian judicial authorities on misconduct in this prison. In August, former presidential candidate and cleric Mehdi Karroubi publicly accused Iranian police of having tortured and raped detainees in this prison. Subsequently, police raided Karroubi's office, confiscating names, addresses, and testimonies of witnesses. In October, the deputy chief of the national police, Brig. Gen. Ahmad-Reza Radan announced that ten persons were under investigation for misconduct at the Kahrizak facility, characterizing the issue as "minor."

In the course of investigations into the killings and torture at the Kahrizak detention center, Pourandarjani appeared before the committee that was carrying out the investigations, and said in his testimony: “They brought Mohsen Rohulamini to me two days before his death after he had been subjected to intense physical torture and was in a dreadful condition. His physical condition was very critical. Despite my very limited medical facilities, I did my best to save him. It was then that I received threats from Kahrizak authorities who warned me that if I said anything about the cause of the Kahrizak victims’ injuries, they would put an end to my life.”

Following his testimony, Pourandarjani was arrested by the police. During his imprisonment, Pourandarjani was interrogated several times by the police force's investigative unit, the martial court, and the Physician General's regulatory council. He was released on bail, warned to say nothing about what he had seen at Kahrizak, and threatened with further imprisonment and with losing his medical licence. Following his release, the physician also received threats from unknown persons warning him to keep silent about what he had witnessed at the Kahrizak jail. Shortly prior to his death, Pourandarjani had told his friends that he feared for his safety.

== Death ==
Iranian authorities prohibited Pourandarjani's family from performing an autopsy. Pourandarjani was buried in the northern city of Tabriz, and unusual security measures were in place for his funeral. Iran's judiciary is reluctant to investigate Pourandarjani's death.

Pourandarjani was born on June 9, 1983 in Tabriz, Iran. When he was eleven years old, he was admitted to a school for gifted students, and at the age of 13 he was the winner of a national poetry competition. In 2001, he began his medical studies in Ardabil. He later transferred to the medical school at the University of Tabriz, and graduated with distinction in 2008. Pourandarjani was fluent in English and French as well as Persian.

Pourandarjani was a co-author on a paper entitled "Finasteride induced depression: a prospective study," published in BMC Clinical Pharmacology in October, 2006. This paper concluded that finasteride, which is used to treat benign prostatic enlargement and male pattern baldness, might induce depressive symptoms in patients. At the time, Pourandarjani was doing research at the Drug Applied Research Center at the Tabriz University of Medical Sciences in Tabriz, Iran.

Pourandarjani also volunteered on a medical advice web page, where he answered questions relating to HIV/AIDS.

He was a member of Language improvement committee "LIC", a student base group volunteering in teaching English to medical students.
