= Saleh Nikbakht =

Iranian lawyer and academic

Mohammad Saleh Nikbakht
- محمد صالح نیکبخت
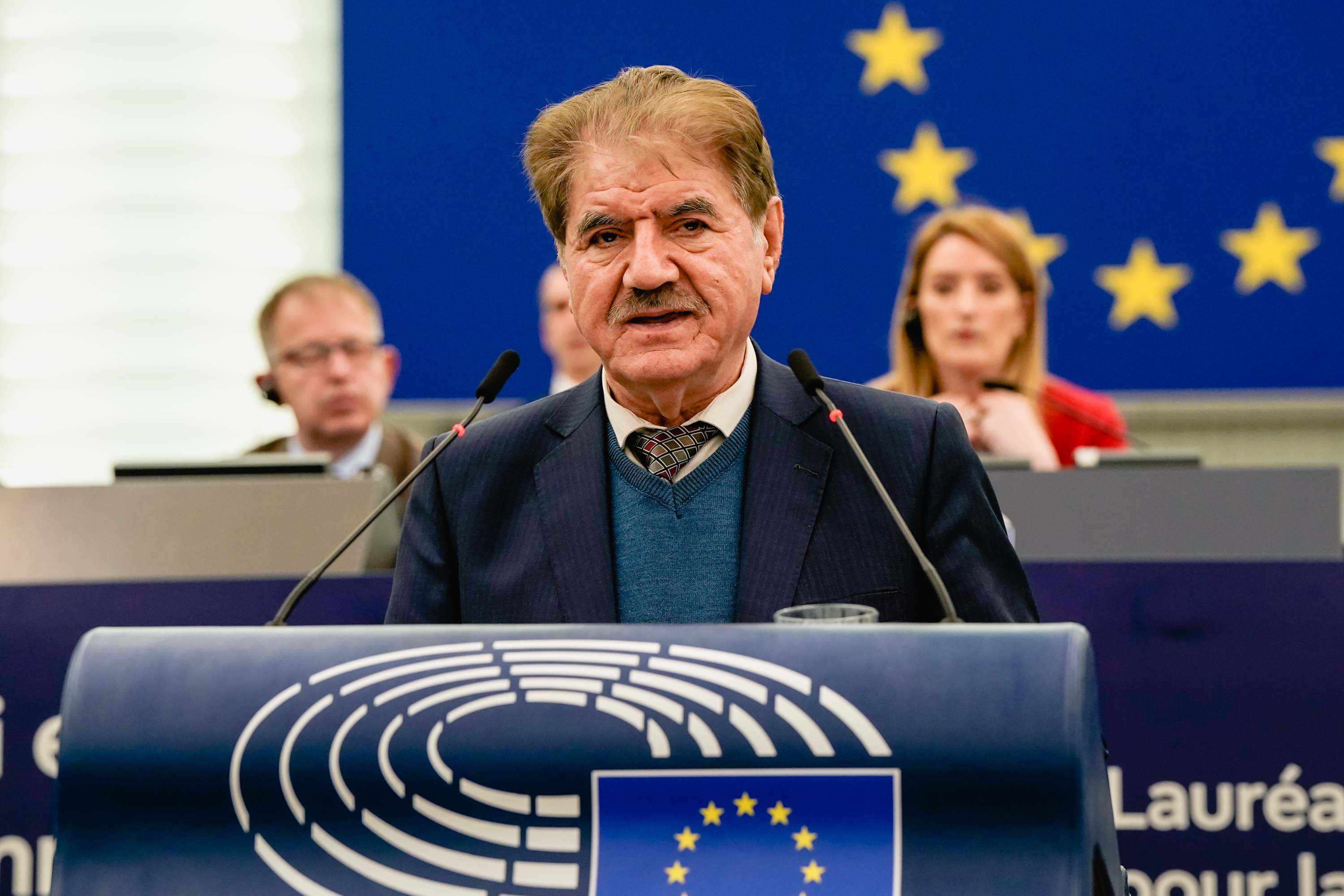
- Born: Saqqez, Kurdistan province, Iran
- Occupation: Lawyer

Saleh Nikbakht (Persian: محمدصالح نیکبخت) is an Iranian lawyer and academic. He is the spokesman for the Society of Political Prisoners in Iran.

== Activities ==
Nikbakht is from Saqqez and studied law and holds a doctoral degree from Tehran University.

Nikbakht was involved in controversial cases including Hashem Aghajari, Abbas Abdi, Emad Baghi and 2009 presidential election detainees. Nikbakht is representing former deputy foreign minister Mohsen Aminzadeh, ex-government spokesman Abdollah Ramezanzadeh, former deputy economy minister Mohsen Safai-Farahani and former vice-president Mohammad Ali Abtahi.

Nikbakht is the lawyer for the family of Mahsa Amini, whose death in 2022 triggered widespread protests throughout Iran. In August 2023, he was subsequently charged with "propaganda against the state" by the Islamic Revolutionary Court in Tehran; his lawyer has alleged these charges stemmed from his interviews with domestic and foreign media outlets.

== Conviction ==
In October 2023, Saleh Nikbakht was called to court on the charge of propagandizing against the Islamic Republic of Iran during an interview with Persian-language TV channels outside Iran about the case of Mahsa Amini, and was finally sentenced to one year in prison and two years of being banned from using cyberspace. In this regard, his lawyer stated that there is no evidence of propaganda against the regime in Nikbakht's interviews.

== European Parliament ==
Nikbakht represented Mahsa Amini, who was given the 2023 Sakharov Prize for Freedom of Thought posthumously at a ceremony in Strasbourg by The European Parliament. Nikbakht also read the message of Mehsa Amini's mother at the ceremony.

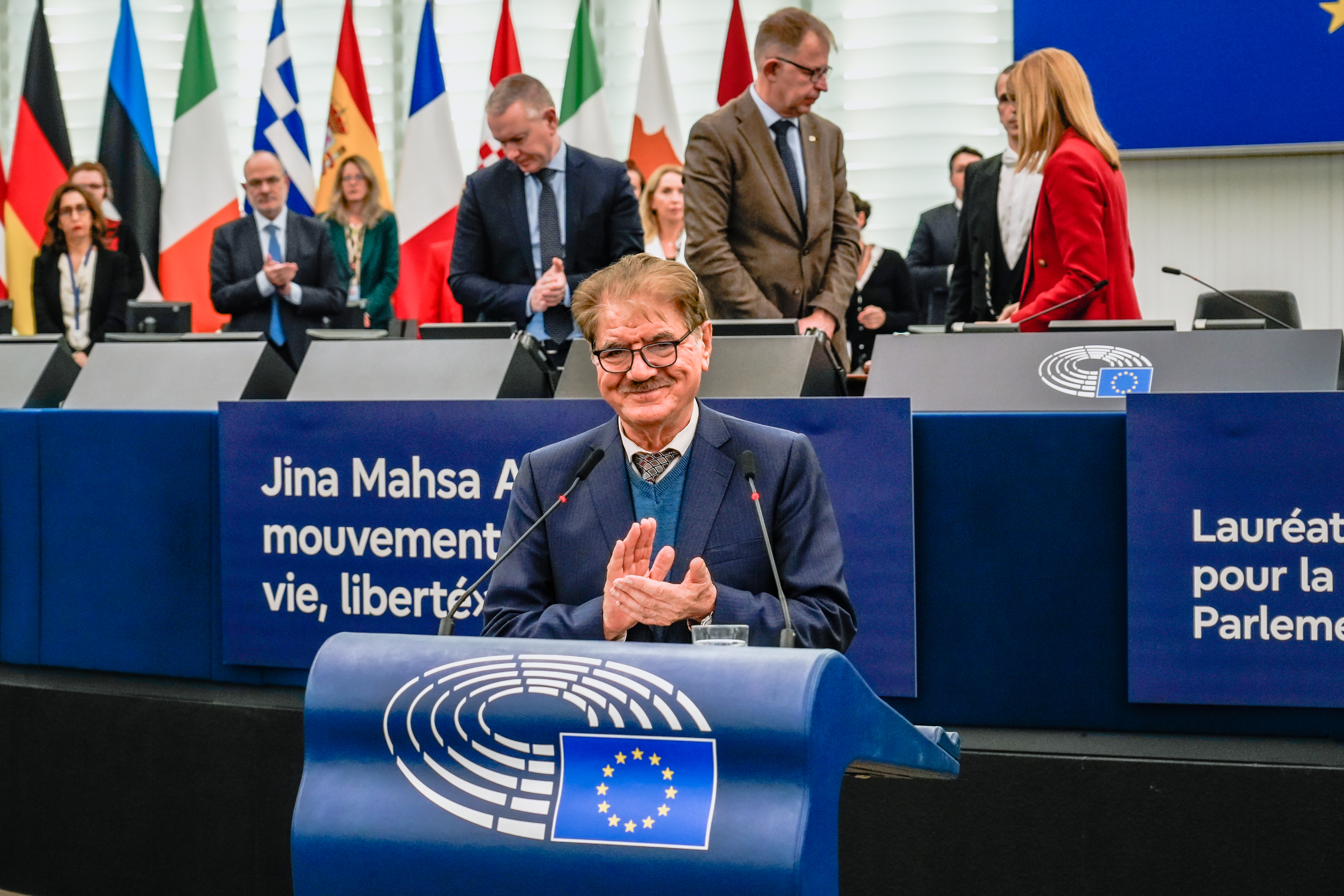

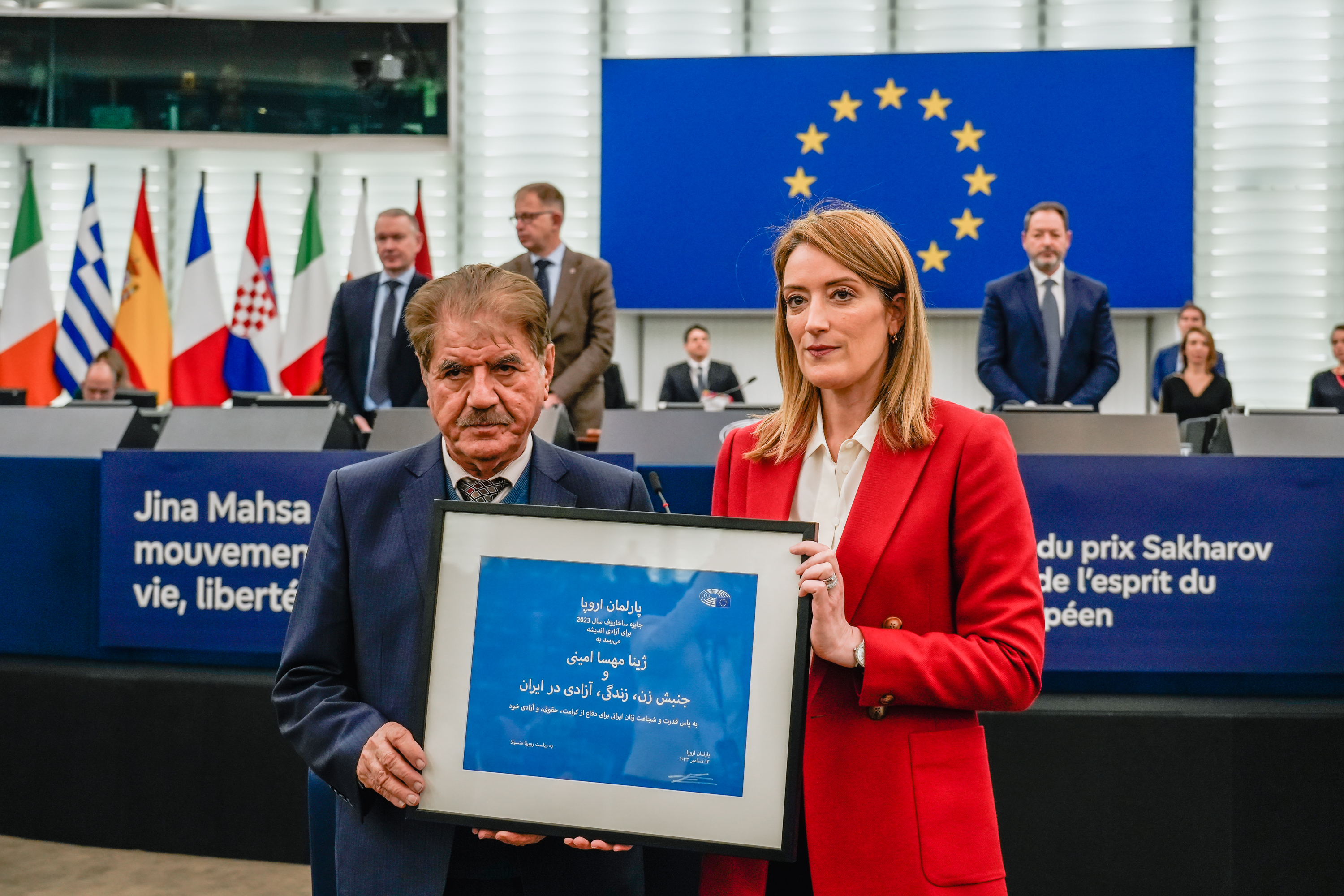

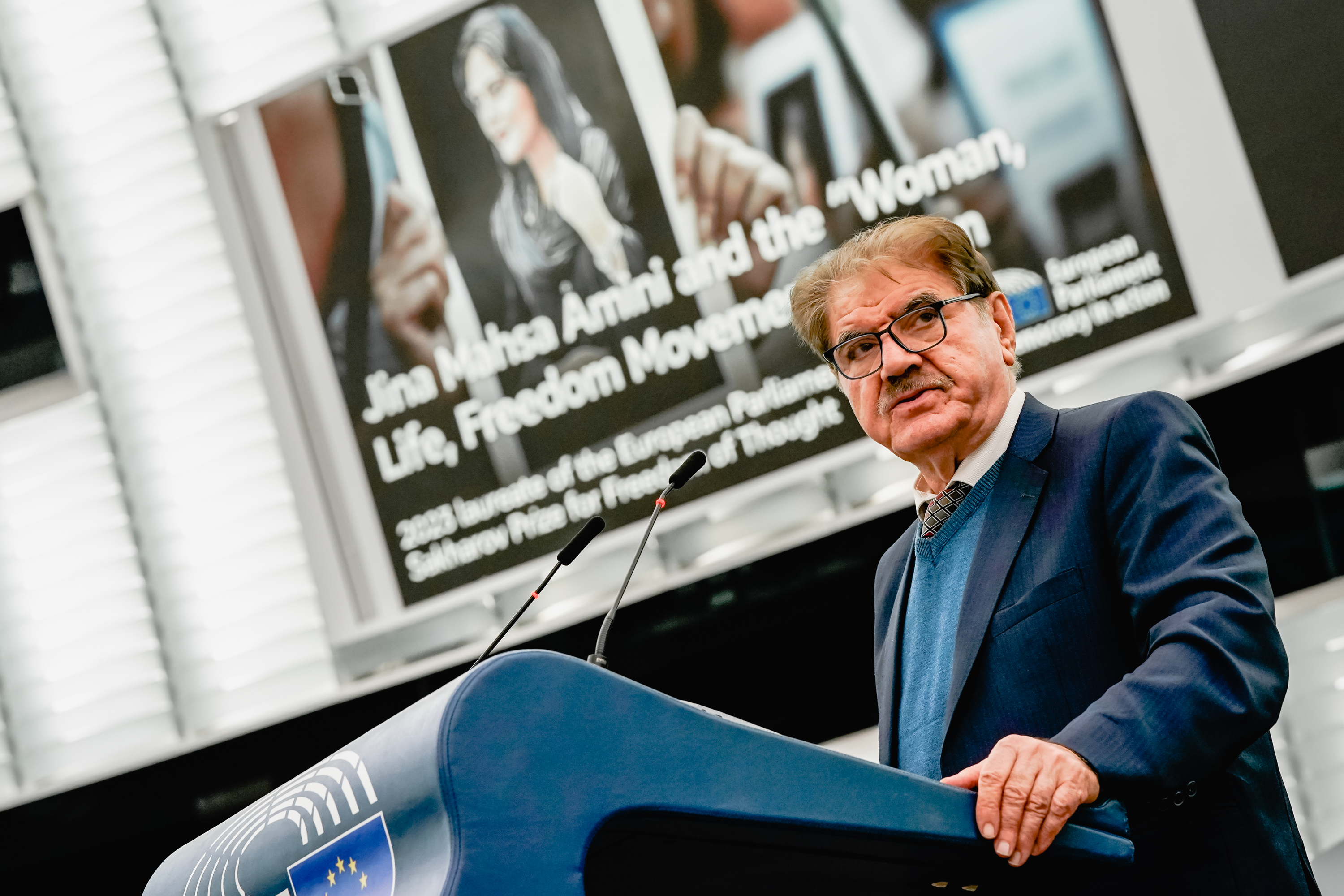

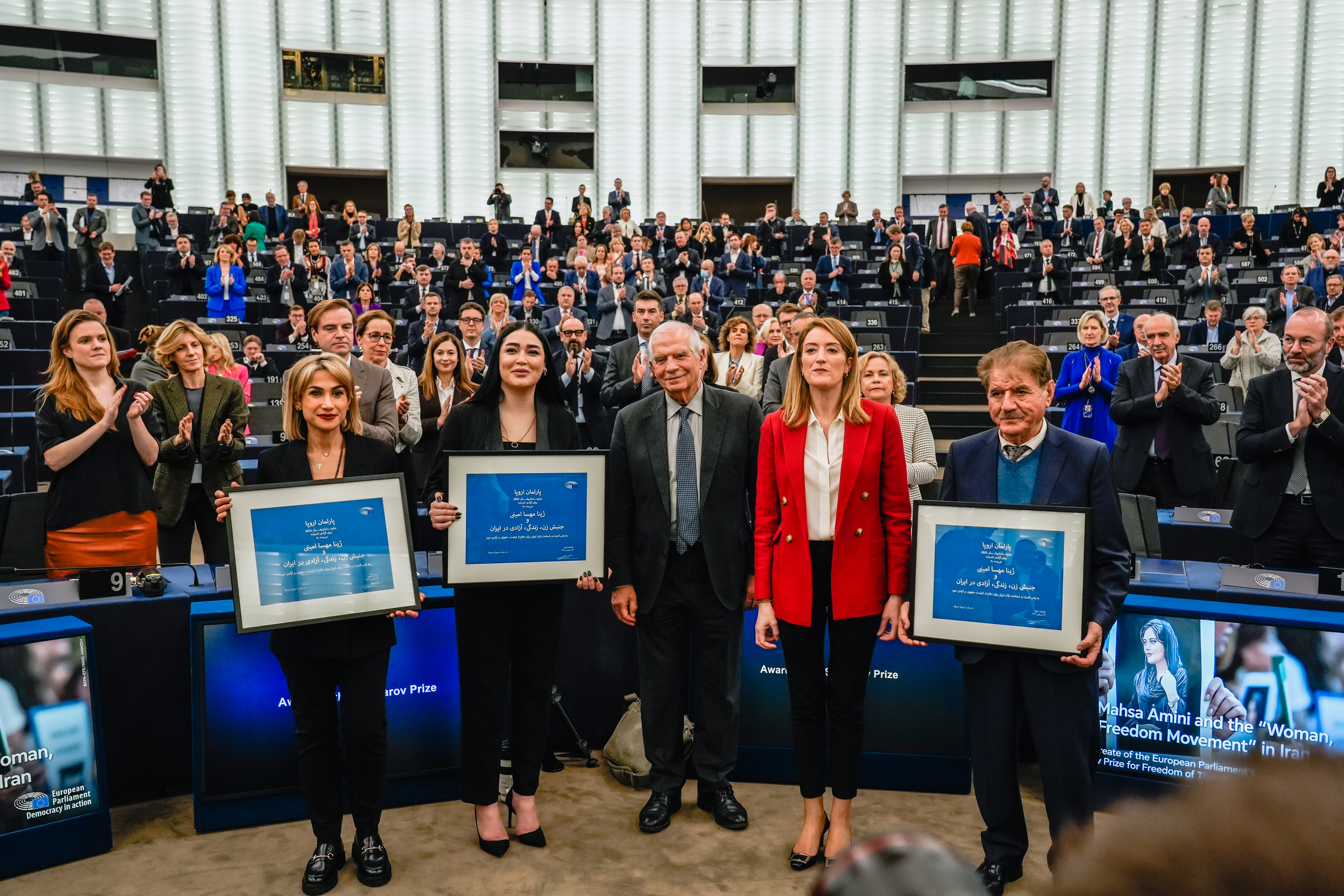
