= Fereshteh Ghazi =

Iranian journalist and human rights activist

Fereshteh Ghazi is an Iranian journalist and human rights activist.

In 2004 she worked for the newspaper Etemad. She is well known for the coverage of Zahra Kazemi's murder in Evin prison. She was herself arrested and imprisoned on two occasions in 2004 During her imprisonment she shared a cell with Shahla Jahed. Upon her release, Ghazi was taken directly to a hospital for treatment due to her poor physical and mental condition.

Ghazi is married to Ahmad Begloo, who is a musician.

== See also ==
- Iranian women's movement
