= Saeed Mortazavi =

Iranian conservative politician, former judge and former prosecutor

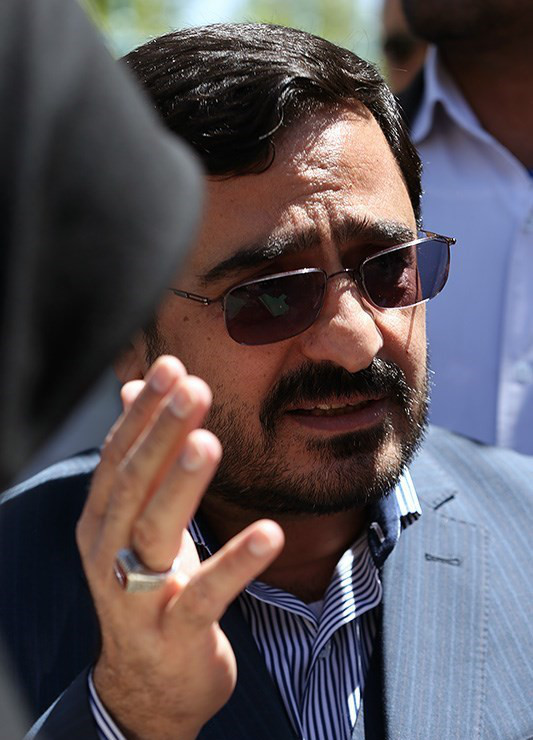
- Mortazavi after a court session (April 2015)

Head of Social Security Organization
- In office 18 March 2012 – 18 August 2013
- President: Mahmoud Ahmadinejad
- Preceded by: Rahmatollah Hafezi
- Succeeded by: Mohammad-Taghi Nourbakhsh

Head of the Central Headquarters for Combating Goods and Currency Smuggling
- In office 16 December 2009 – 14 July 2012
- President: Mahmoud Ahmadinejad
- Preceded by: Gholam-Hossein Elham
- Succeeded by: Fada Hossein Maleki

Deputy to Prosecutor-General of Iran
- In office 29 August 2009 – August 2010
- Appointed by: Sadeq Larijani

Prosecutor-General of Tehran
- In office 18 May 2003 – 29 August 2009
- Appointed by: Mahmoud Hashemi Shahroudi

Head of the Islamic Revolutionary Court Branch 1410, Press Special Court
- In office late 1990s – early 2000s
- Appointed by: Mohammad Yazdi

Personal details
- Born: 26 November 1967 (age 58) Taft, Yazd, Iran
- Spouse: Homa Fallah-Tafti
- Education: University of Judicial Sciences and Administrative Services
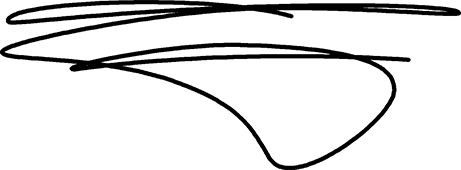
- Signature

Saeed Mortazavi (Persian: سعید مرتضوی, born 26 November 1967) is an Iranian conservative politician, former judge and former prosecutor. He was the prosecutor of the Islamic Revolutionary Court, and Prosecutor General of Tehran, a position he held from 2003 to 2009. He has been called as "butcher of the press" and a "torturer of Tehran" by some observers. Mortazavi has been accused of the torture and death in custody of Iranian-Canadian photographer Zahra Kazemi by the Canadian government and was named by 2010 Iranian parliamentary report as the man responsible for the abuse of dozens and death of three political prisoners at Kahrizak detention center in 2009. He was put on trial in February 2013 after a parliamentary committee blamed him for the torture and deaths of at least three detainees who participated in the protests against President Mahmud Ahmadinejad's reelection. On 15 November 2014, he was banned from all political and legal positions for life.

== Career and actions ==
Before his prosecutorial appointment, Mortazavi was a judge.

On 18 May 2003, he became prosecutor general of Tehran, a position he held until 29 August 2009. The post had been unfilled for eight years since Iran abolished prosecutors in 1995. In the intervening years, judges performed the prosecutor's role.

=== Death of Zahra Kazemi ===
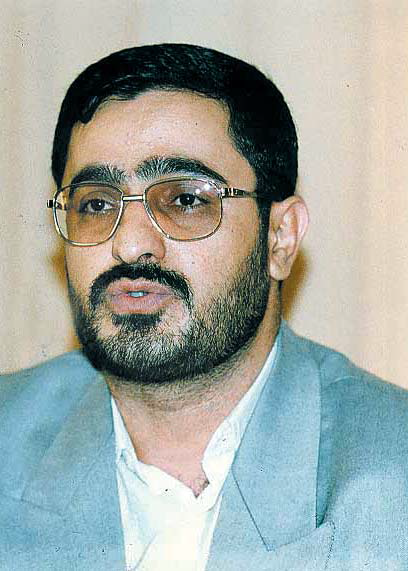
Mortazavi in a press conference, 22 July 2003

Mortazavi is notable for his involvement in the case of Zahra Kazemi, an Iranian-Canadian photographer who died in the custody of Iranian officials in 2003. As a judge, Mortazevi was involved in some unknown capacity in Kazemi's interrogation. He was later assigned to investigate the disputed circumstances of her death. However, it was subsequently reported that Mortazevi had decided to let a military court perform the investigation. In late 2003, the Iranian Parliament issued a report accusing Mortazavi of trying to cover up Kazemi's death and forcing witnesses to the event to change their stories. Murtazevi strongly denied the accusations, although the government of Canada continues to claim that not only did Mortazavi order Kazemi's arrest, but he also supervised her torture and was present when she was killed.

=== Suppression of press ===
Mortazavi is often portrayed in the Western media as a symbol of problems within the judicial system of Iran. It has been reported that Iranians call him the "butcher of the press". As a judge, he shut down 60 pro-reform newspapers.

In 2004 he was behind the detention of more than 20 bloggers and journalists who were held for long periods and forced to sign "confessions" of their "illicit activities".

In 2005, journalists reported receiving death threats after testifying about their alleged torture at the command of Mortazevi. In a press conference, Mortazevi denied the journalists had been mistreated. At the same time, in state custody. Also in 2005, Murtazevi ordered Iran's major ISPs to block access to Orkut and other blogging and social networking websites.

On 15 February 2008, it was announced that Mortazavi had banned five Iranian websites that comment on politics and current events. Mortazevi said they were "poisoning the electoral sphere" before Iran's mid-March parliamentary elections.

=== United Nations visit ===
In 2006, Mortazavi was sent to Geneva as part of the Iranian delegation to the United Nations Human Rights Council, a decision that was met with some criticism at home and abroad due to Mortazavi's controversial human rights record. Human Rights Watch urged Iran to remove him from the delegation and other countries to decline to meet with the Iranian delegation until his removal. Mortazevi's first official meeting was with the also-controversial Zimbabwe a minister of justice Patrick Chinamasa. Mortazavi took advantage of his position on the delegation to advocate the right of access to high technology, including nuclear power, for all nations. He also warned the council that it should avoid being manipulated into doing the bidding of powerful states and that it should investigate human rights abuses perpetrated by Western powers, notably human rights abuses in the war on terror, extraordinary rendition, Islamophobia, criticism of the Islamic dress code and veil, and the suppression of the freedom of speech of Holocaust deniers.

=== Student protesters ===
In 2009, it was reported that Mortazavi had detained students due to a protest against Mahmoud Ahmadinejad's government; the students alleged abuse while in jail. He has been involved in more contentious cases since then as well. Mortazavi was a prosecutor on the cases of Roxana Saberi, an American-Iranian journalist accused of spying, and Iranian-Canadian blogger Hossein Derakhshan, whose posts were critical of the establishment.

=== Arrests of 2009 election protesters ===
During the 2009 election dispute across Iran, Mortazavi actively suppressed the demonstrations. He has signed arrest warrants for reformers, such as Saeed Hajjarian, and is believed to be instrumental in the more than 600 arrests nationwide.

In early 2010 the Iranian parliament released a report identifying Saeed Mortazavi as "the main culprit in the scandal" over the Kahrizak detention center. The report stated that 147 prisoners arrested for participating in demonstrations against irregularities in the 2009 election of President Ahmadinejad had been "held in a 70-square-meter room for four days without proper ventilation, heating and food on Mortazavi's orders". Three of the inmates died, including Mohsen Rouhalamini, the son of a "distinguished government scientist."

Mortazavi maintained that the prisoners had "died from meningitis" and that "inoculation kits had been sent to detention centers" to prevent the condition from spreading. This claim was dismissed by an examining doctor, Ramin Pourandarjani, who refused to certify it as the cause of death until he was arrested and forced to do so. Pourandarjani later died mysteriously after being charged with failing to treat the prisoners properly. The report rejected Mortazavi's claim.

The report, however, also "strongly rejected" reports that rape or sexual assault had occurred in prison. Opposition websites have reported rapes at the prison, including the rape of a pro-government photographer, Saeed Sadeghi, which allegedly led to the prison's closing. Sadeghi is said to have been accidentally swept up in the mass arrests and held at Kahrizak, after which he complained to Supreme Leader Ali Khamenei of his treatment. Khamenei later closed the prison.

=== Deputy prosecutor-general ===
On 31 August 2009, Mortazavi was demoted to deputy prosecutor-general – "one of six deputies for prosecutor-general Gholam-Hossein Mohseni-Eje'i" – by the new judiciary chief Ayatollah Sadeq Larijani. Do observers disagree over whether the post was a promotion to "deputy to the nation's top prosecutor," with "a fancy title and protection from future legal action," or "a demotion" that strips him of powers he had enjoyed, such as the ability to order an arrest or halt to political activities. Saeed Mortazavi is facing a potential investigation into his conduct of post-vote trials.

=== Task Force Against Smuggling ===
In 2010 Mortazavi was appointed head of Iran's Task Force Against Smuggling, shortly after he was discredited by the release of a report by the Iranian parliament naming him as the man largely responsible for the abuse of political prisoners committed in July 2009 by state security forces at the Kahrizak detention center. Some saw the appointment as an example of President Ahmadinejad's loyalty to his "dwindling" band of core supporters.

=== Social Security Organization ===
Mortazavi was "head of Iran's Social Security Organization", a presidentially-appointed post. In January 2013, Iran's parliament successfully "lobbied to have him removed" from this position, but following that, Ahmadinejad reappointed him as head of the organization in a "caretaker role".

== Trial ==
Saeed Mortazavi
- Status: awaiting trial
- Criminal charges: Unlawful arrest Filing a false report
- Penalty: 2,000,000 Rials fine ($25); Suspended for life from judicial duties banned for 5 years from government work
- Accomplices: Ali Akbar Heydarifar; Hassan Zare Dehnavi

In late August 2010, Saeed Mortazavi and two judges were suspended from office after a judicial investigation into the deaths of three men from torture detained on his orders following the controversial June 2009 presidential election. This stripped him of his immunity as a member of the judiciary. On 5 February 2013 a statement posted on the Tehran prosecutor's website announced Mortazavi's arrest. Two days later he was released. No explanation was given for the detention or his release at the time.

The trial of Mortazavi and two co-defendants began on 26 February 2013. Charges against Mortazavi and his former deputy Ali Akbar Heydarifar and former Judge Hassan Zare Dehnavi include unlawful arrest, filing a false report, and assisting in the filing of a false report. "There are conflicting reports on whether the three also face murder charges." On the opening day of proceedings, the presiding Judge—Siamak Modir Khorasani—announced the trial would be held behind closed doors.

The lack of transparency in the trial has been criticized by Shirin Ebadi and others. According to Ebadi,

The accused in this case, particularly former prosecutor Said Mortazavi, received direct orders from officials above him – including the Leader. Therefore, [the authorities] would never dare publicly put him on trial.

According to journalists Golnaz Esfandiari and Mohammad Zarghami and other sources, the trial is "widely seen as an indirect move against Ahmadinejad", since he had "used Mortazavi to bring corruption charges against his political rivals" in the past. The arrest came a day after Ahmadinejad "released a secret video in parliament where Mortazavi allegedly discussed a fraudulent business deal, implicating Iran's highly influential Larijani family".
