= Mohammad-Ali Abtahi =

Iranian cleric and politician

Seyyed Mohammad-Ali Abtahi
- محمدعلی ابطحی
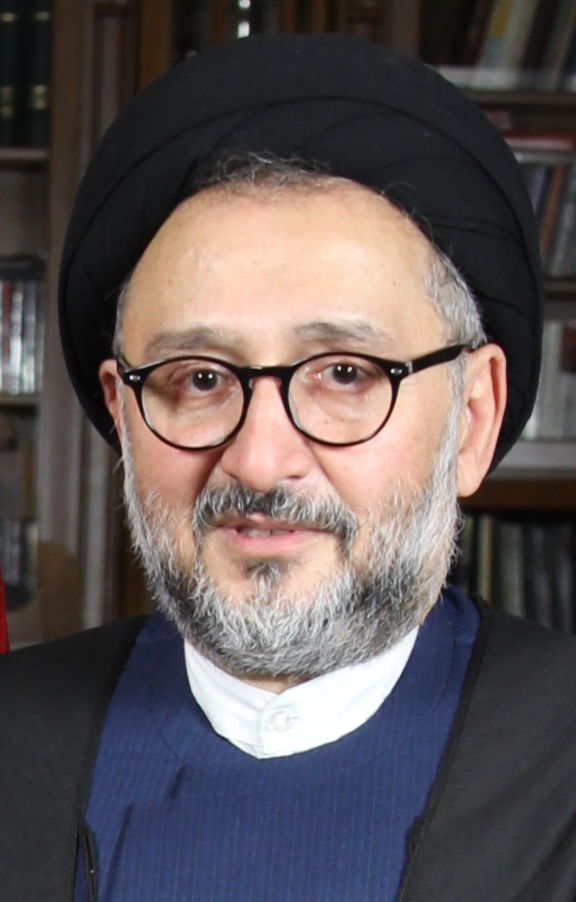
- Abtahi in 2017

Vice President of Iran for Legal and Parliamentary Affairs
- In office 2 September 2001 – 12 October 2004
- President: Mohammad Khatami
- Preceded by: Abdolvahed Mousavi Lari
- Succeeded by: Majid Ansari

Head of President's Office
- In office 10 August 1997 – 2 September 2001
- President: Mohammad Khatami
- Preceded by: Mohsen Hashemi Rafsanjani
- Succeeded by: Ali Khatami

Personal details
- Born: September 29, 1958 (age 67) Mashhad, Imperial State of Iran
- Party: Association of Combatant Clerics
- Education: Isfahan University (B.A. in Western Philosophy); University of Tehran (M.A. in education)
- Website: www.webneveshteha.com

Mohammad-Ali Abtahi (Persian: محمدعلی ابطحی; born January 28, 1960) is an Iranian theologian, scholar, pro-democracy activist and chairman of the Institute for Interreligious Dialogue. During the 1980s, he worked as the head of IRIB broadcasting in Mashhad, Bushehr, and Shiraz, and between 2001 and 2004 he worked as the vice-president for legal affairs in Majlis (Islamic Parliament of Iran) and was the advisor to the president between 2004 and 2005.

After three years of living in Lebanon he joined the presidential election campaign as an IRIB broadcasting representative. He also took the position of the head of the president's office at the time of the 7th government ( Seyed Mohammad Khatami). He served as the deputy for legal affairs for the Islamic Consultative Assembly between 2001 and 2004.

== Biography ==
Mohammad Ali Abtahi, born January 28, 1960, in Mashhad, was the eldest child of Seyed Hassan Abtahi and Seyedeh Zahra Hashemi. His father being from Mashhad and his mother - Abdolkarim Hasheminejad's sister - being from Behshahr, he pursued his educations in religious studies as a family tradition and in 1976 he accomplished Dars-Kharij-Fiqh. In late 1978, he married his cousin, Fahimeh Mousavinejad, the daughter of Mohammad Mousavinejad and had three daughters, Faezeh, Fatemeh and Farideh.

He has three brothers, Mohammad Taghi, Hossein, and Reza and two sisters, Hourieh and Narges.

== Positions in the Islamic Republic ==
Due to his background in supporting the Islamic Revolution, and his amateur activities in arts and culture before the Islamic Revolution in 1979, he was elected as the director of Mashhad Broadcasting programs. After a two-year-old residence in Qom dedicated to his studies, he became the chief executive director of Boushehr and Shiraz Broadcasting. Abtahi was transferred to Tehran in 1983 and was assigned as Radio Iran's director. He remained in the same position until 1988, when he became the deputy of IRIB Broadcasting overseas department, and while Mohammad Reza Khatami was the minister of Islamic Guidance, Abtahi became the deputy of the international affairs of this ministry, responsible for community centers (Khane-ye-Farhang) and cultural discussions all over the world. After Mohammad Reza Khatami's resignation in 1992, he resigned as well and returned to IRIB Broadcasting as the adviser to the president ,Mohammad Hashemi Rafsanjani. While Ali Larijani worked as the head of IRIB, he started his work at IRIB Broadcasting in Beirut. In the 1997 presidential election, he left Beirut and joining Mohammad Khatami's campaign, he became the head of the president's office on July 10, 1997. After the presidential election in 2001, he became the deputy for legal affairs in the Islamic Parliament of Iran. After the 7th Parliament poll, and after three resignations, he was accepted to resign on October 12, 2004, and became the adviser president consultant. He has been a member of the Founders’ Council and Central Council of Combatant Clergy Association ever since they have been established. Together with his wife, Fahimeh Mousavi Nejad, he established the Religions’ Dialogue NGO and has given speeches at dozens of international inter-religion conferences.

=== The Election of 2009 and detention ===
In the 10th election, unlike Khatami who supported Mir-Hossein Mousavi, he joined Mehdi Karroubi’s campaign and was arrested on June 16, 2009. Following the post-election struggles, he was arrested together with several other reformists. He was arrested by the order of Saeed Mortazavi issued before the election. His wife states (regarding his arrest):

I met my husband 43 days after he had been arrested, while he had lost about 43 kilos. and said they had been giving him a tablet during the last few days which had calmed him down against all the excitements of the world.

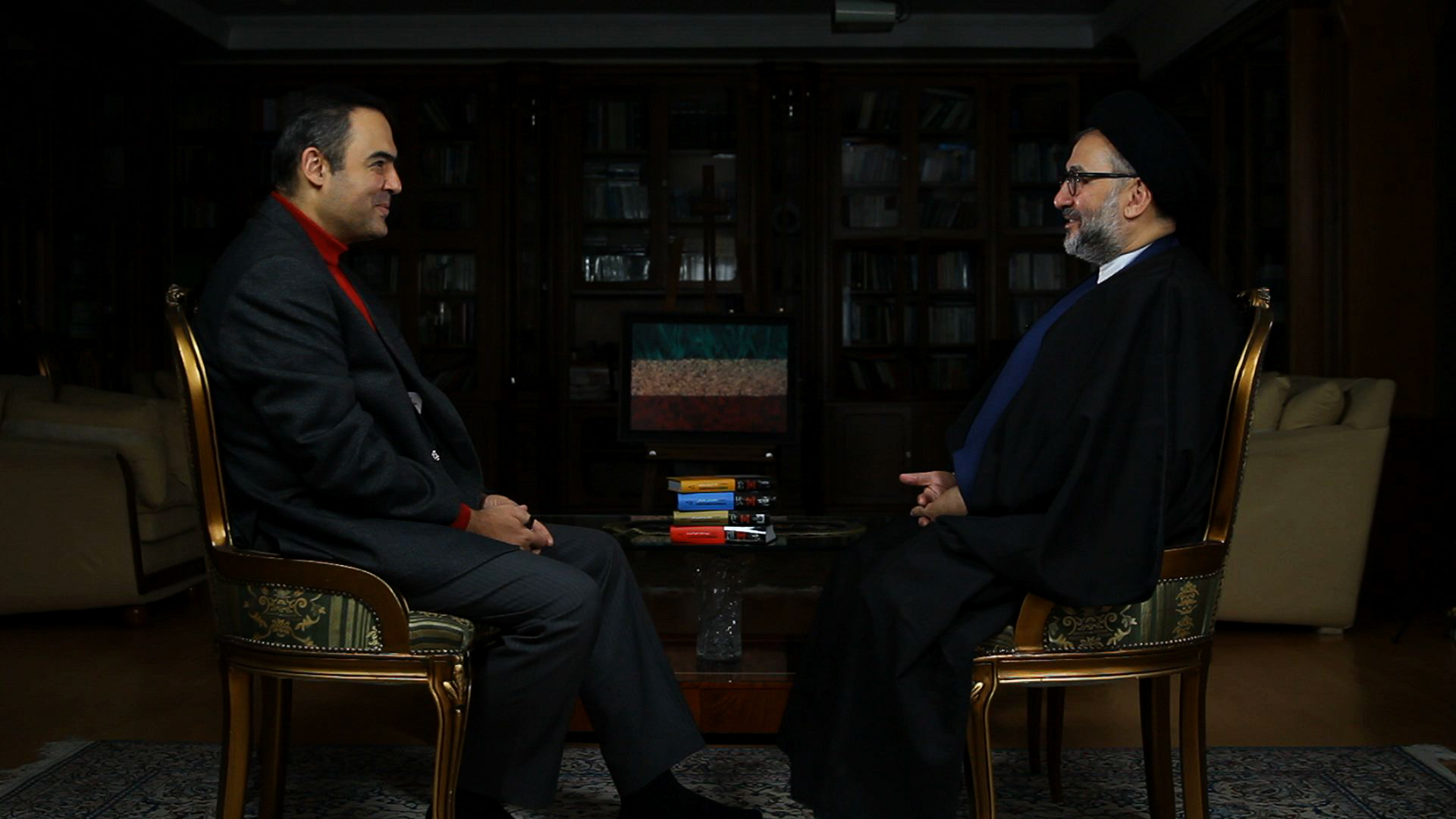
Mohammad Ali Abtahi interviewing Hossein Dehbashi in Khesht Kham program

Mohammad Ali Abtahi's conversation in the Khesht Kham program

Though Abtahi denied receiving any tablets in an interview broadcast on August 2, in Bist-o-Si, he attended the first trial session of suspects in the meeting hall of the Tehran General Department of Justice. A few years after he was released, he had an interview with Hossein Dehbashi in Khesht-e-Kham in which Abtahi explained his reasons for what he had said on the trial session.

=== Statements on the Trial Session ===
On August 1, 2009, in a court presided over by Judge Salavati and without the presence of independent journalists, the jury, the defendants' lawyer (Saleh Nikbakht) and the defendants' family.

Only the reporters of IRIB new Agency, IRNA and Fars News were present at the court. Also, the camera team of Press TV was not allowed to take pictures. Abtahi was trialed along with 100 other people.

He appeared in a news conference together with Mohammad Atrianfar and considered Mir-Hossein Mousavi to be under the illusion of fraud and called Seyyed Mohammad Khatami's association with Mousavi treacherous. He also accused Akbar Hashemi Rafsanjani of taking revenge on Mahmoud Ahmadinejad and Ali Khamenei.

The Secretariat of Expediency Discernment Council issued a statement rejecting the remarks of Abtahi, calling them completely false, claiming the uncertainty of the conditions and considerations under which these remarks were made.

On November 21, 2009, Abtahi was sentenced to six years of penal servitude, and on November 22, 2009, he was released from prison after 160 days on bail. After his release, Zahra Rahnavard, Mir-Hossein Mousavi, Mohammad Khatami, Mehdi Karroubi and Hassan Khomeini visited him at his home.

=== The assault and attack ===
On June 20, 2010, after a memorial for Mirza Javad Tehrani, some plainclothesmen attacked him and beat him severely.

“I passed there and turned into the side boulevard; I was chased by some motorcycle riders when suddenly the driver of a Pride took his colt out and blocked my way. First, they kicked my car widely in a way that even the side mirror of the car was smashed. Then one of the cycle riders took a knife out of his shirt and as he was approaching me, he shouted “get out of the car” several times. He hit the car with his knife and at the same time, another cycle rider approached me with a thick cable in his hand, and hit the rear window so severely that the whole glass was smashed, making a loud sound. Suddenly I noticed another man who had entered my car through the broken window and when I tried to push him out, he sprayed tear gas directly into my eyes. My clothes were completely covered with pieces of broken glass, and I could see nothing due to the tear gas; yet, I tried to get out of the car and could pass from the side of their car. At the same time as they were still busy, I tried my best to get away from there. Then, I saw a man cycling in front of them all. He was talking on the phone and signaled them to stop. I managed to escape that catastrophic condition with that car. There were no police officers around, and they were not worried about the arrival of any police officer, either.”

=== Attending the leader's Ramadan Breakfast Ceremony ===
On May 23, 2018, Abtahi, together with several other members of the government was invited to the Supreme Leader’s Ramadan breakfast ceremony, at the leader’s Beyt after many years.

=== 2025–2026 Iranian protests ===
On 1 February, in light of the 2025–2026 Iranian protests, Abtahi, in an interview with Eslahatnews, was quoted saying: "I hope that a serious transformation will occur after the relationship between society and the government has deteriorated so that we can return to common principles again, although I personally do not have much hope that anyone will think about major changes."

== Government positions ==
1969: Mashhad Broadcasting Director

1972: General Director of Boushehr and Shiraz Broadcasting

1973: Radio Iran Director

1978: Deputy of IRIB Broadcasting overseas department

1978: Deputy of the International Affairs of the Islamic Guidance Ministry

1994: IRIB Representative in Beirut

1997: Head of the President’s office

2001: Deputy of the Presidents’ Legal and Parliament Affairs

2004: Advisor to the President

== Blogs ==
He is the first Iranian politician to use Internet to write blogs. In a rare event, from November 2003 to June 13, 2009, he wrote in the “Webnevesht” blog series without even a single interval, for six unremitting years. After Abtahi was imprisoned for 70 days, his weblog was updated for a week, from somewhere located inside the prison. This was met with the blog writers’ uncertainty, and the reformists never believed that Abtahi himself had written them.

== Books, articles, and interviews ==
=== ‌Books ===
1- The assassination of a President (Translation)

2- A Dialogue with Christian Thinkers (Religion in the Contemporary World) 1990 Tarh-e-No Publication

3- Prudence and Tolerance, 2004, Loh-e-Fekr Publication

4- A comic book; Al-Ahghar to Be Sacrificed for You, 2004, Loh-e-Fekr Publication

5- For My Heart 2005, Chalesh Publication

6- Without a Mask, 2005, Chalesh Publication

7- We Lost (A study of the political losses since 2005) 2017, Rouzegar Publication

8- Nuclear Halo, 2017, Sales Publication

9- I Have Come for Your Smile 2017, Aban Publication

10- From Corona and Other Evils 2021, Rozaneh Publication

11- Khan Alley, a Novel, 2023 Ghoghnous Publication

12- No One Believes Here 2011 Morvarid Publication, (It has not yet received the publication permission.)

=== Articles and interviews ===
Dozens of his articles have been published in Iranian and foreign newspapers, and many of his interviews with international broadcasts have been released so far.

He has interviewed in Arabic, in several TV programs with Aljazirah, Al-Arabia, and Arabic B.B.C.

A friendly conversation between Siavash Ardalan with Mohammad Ali Abtahi grabbed many people's attention in 2017.

Political offices
Preceded by	Chief of Staff of the President of Iran; 1997–2001	Succeeded by Ali Khatami
Preceded by Abdolvahed Mousavi Lari	Vice President for Legal and Parliamentary Affairs; 2001–2004	Succeeded by Majid Ansari
