= Kahrizak Detention Center =

Detention center in Iran

Coordinates: 35°24′00″N 51°22′31″E

Kahrizak Detention Center (Persian: بازداشتگاه کهریزک) is a detainment facility operated by the Judicial system of Iran in Kahrizak, Tehran Province, Iran.

== Before the 2009 election protests ==
Authorities first made plans for the Kahrizak detention center in 2001. The center's cells, located underground, were apparently built without free access to fresh air and toilet facilities. With the appointment of Ahmad-Reza Radan to the post of Tehran police chief, the center became a key site for carrying out the "Public Security Plan" targeting drug addicts and so-called "thugs and louts" endangering public morality.

Reports of inhumane treatment of the prisoners at Kahrizak were released, with some comparing the conditions there unfavorably to even the notorious political ward 209 of Evin prison. Opposition groups have published unverified reports of human rights abuses and as many as 6,000 deaths inside the prison during the years 2007 and 2008.

== 2009 election protests ==
Several thousand civilians and activists were arrested after the disputed presidential election in 2009. The head of the national security forces, Esmail Ahmadi-Moghaddam, stated in an interview with state television on August 5, 2009, that only the most dangerous offenders involved in the election protests were to be delivered to the Kahrizak center, which has a 50 prisoner capacity. The rest were to be taken to Evin prison. Tehran riot police and Basij members used other official and unofficial sites to detain suspects charged with endangering national security and public safety during the protests, including the Level -4 detention center in the Interior Ministry building. Ahmadi-Moghaddam further admitted in his television interview that many of the 140 prisoners he claimed to be housed at Kahrizak were low priority suspects. Mohsen Ruholamini, the son of a conservative politician who had supported pragmatic presidential candidate Mohsen Rezaee, was among the Kahrizak prisoners.

On August 9, 2009, in a letter to the Chairman of the Expediency Discernment Council of Iran, Mehdi Karroubi demanded investigation of Iranian prisons for possible tortures and in particular sexual harassment of men and women. On August 19, he wrote to parliament speaker Ali Larijani, asking to meet with him, President Mahmoud Ahmadinejad, judiciary chief Ayatollah Sadeq Larijani, former president Akbar Hashemi Rafsanjani and the state prosecutor to "personally present my documents and evidence over the cases of sexual abuse in some prisons specially Kahrizak."

Ali Larijani and Sadeq Larijani (Judiciary committee) both officially rejected his claims and Ali Khamenei's representatives, and Vice Chairman of National Security Commission of the parliament demanded Karroubi's arrest.

== Detainee abuse ==
The release of some prisoners from Kahrizak on July 28, 2009, was followed by a number of testimonials in the foreign and opposition press on conditions inside the prison. Various news articles have reported on cramped and squalid cells where prisoners were routinely verbally abused and beaten by guards, some to death. Ahmad-Reza Radan, according to one account, daily took part in these beatings. Ahmadi-Moghaddam has since denied these reports about Radan as unfounded rumors. Mohsen Ruholamini and Amir Javadifar were two of the prisoners reported to have died from torture at Kahrizak. The medical report on Ruholamini's death originally stated that Ruholomini died of "physical stress, the effects of being held in bad conditions, multiple blows and severe injuries to the body." The physician who wrote this report, Ramin Pourandarjani, subsequently died in mysterious circumstances in police headquarters. The autopsy report for Javadifar stated that his death was caused by blunt trauma injury from severe beating.

== National reactions ==
Following massive arrests of civilians and reformist activists by Iranian police, a number of Iranian intellectuals and reformist activists condemned the detentions, and called for the release of the imprisoned protesters.

In an exceptionally strong and critical speech, the Iranian opposition leader, Mir-Hossein Mousavi spoke out on July 17, 2009, against the arrests and killings of protesters. Erstwhile prime minister Moussavi said, "How can it be that the leaders of our country do not cry out and shed tears about these tragedies? ... Can they not see it, feel it? These things are blackening our country, blackening all our hearts. If we remain silent, it will destroy us all and take us to hell."

Grand Ayatollah Hosein-Ali Montazeri on 29 July demanded prosecution of anybody responsible for abuses. "Can the government deceive people by closing a detention center and blaming all the faults on a building?" he said. "What benefit does the government gain from the crisis, except angering the majority of the people and weakening the Islamic republic?" He added "Was the regime of the Shah able to resist the wave of dissatisfaction by using terror, oppression, censorship, torture, forced confessions and lying propaganda?"

Grand Ayatollah Asadollah Bayat-Zanjani said: "We are witnessing sorrowful acts committed in the name of the regime and under the banner of God that bring pain to the heart of all supporters of the Islamic republic."

== Closure and investigations ==
Despite numerous reports of death and torture of arrested protesters in Iranian prisons, neither Iranian leader nor the Head of Judicial System took any measure to stop the crimes.

The crimes were so grave that even several well known conservative politicians like Ali Motahhari expressed concerns about them.

It was only after the death of the son of one of the conservative politicians, that the Iranian leader Ali Khamenei and head of Judicial System, Hashemi Shahroudi stepped in and ordered the closure of Kahrizak detention center.

An official announcement was made on August 5, 2009, that three prison wardens were arrested in connection with the torture of detainees at Kahrizak.

On December 19, 2009, Iranian authorities acknowledged that at least three protesters had been beaten to death in the Kahrizak jail. Twelve prison officials were charged with crimes, including murder.

The Iranian parliament assigned a committee to investigate the incidents. The committee released a report in January 2010 that implicated former Tehran prosecutor-general Saeed Mortazavi as being behind the abuses. Days before the report was issued, Iranian President Mahmoud Ahmadinejad appointed Mortazavi as his special advisor on smuggling, which in effect was an attempt to shield Mortazavi from prosecution. On August 19, 2015, Mortazavi was acquitted on charges connected to the torture and deaths of three young men at Kahrizak in 2009, but the court's decision was appealed. In September 2016, Mortazavi issued a public apology for the prisoner killings.

== Re-opening of Kahrizak detention center ==
Ahmadi-Moghaddam on August 5, 2009, stated that the security forces were re-building the Kahrizak facility to meet national prison standards and would re-open its doors in one month.

== See also ==
- Detainee abuse
- Guantanamo Bay detention camp
- 2009 Iran poll protests trial
