= Killing of Neda Agha-Soltan =

2009 killing in Tehran

Neda Agha-Soltan
- ندا آقاسلطان
- Photo by Caspian Makan
- Born: 14 September 1982; Ray, Iran
- Died: 20 June 2009 (aged 26); West of Kārgar Avenue at the intersection between Khosravi and Sālehi streets, Tehran, Iran; 35°43′08.6″N 51°23′30.6″E
- Cause of death: Gunshot wound
- Resting place: Behesht-e Zahrā cemetery, southern Tehran
- Education: Islamic Āzād University (second semester of Theology)
- Employer: Family's travel agency
- Known for: Death during the 2009 Iranian election protests
- Political party: Known as generally apolitical

Neda Agha-Soltan (Persian: ندا آقاسلطان; 14 September 1982 – 20 June 2009) was an Iranian student of philosophy and tourist guide, who was participating in the 2009 Iranian presidential election protests with her music teacher, and was walking back to her car when she was fatally shot in the upper chest.

Eyewitnesses are reported by Western sources as saying Agha-Soltan was shot by a militiaman belonging to the IRGC's Basij paramilitary organization. Her death was captured on video by bystanders and broadcast over the Internet, and the video became a rallying point for the opposition. Agha-Soltan's death sparked renewed protests against the disputed election of President Mahmoud Ahmadinejad.

== Etymology ==
Nedā (ندا) is a word used in classical Persian and modern Persian to mean "voice", "calling" (sometimes understood as a "divine message", but this is not the etymological sense of ندا), and she has been referred to as the "voice of Iran".

== Biography ==
Agha-Soltan was the middle child of a middle-class family of three children, whose family resided in a fourth floor flat on Meshkini Street in the Tehranpars district of Tehran. Her father was a civil servant and her mother was a homemaker. She attended Islamic Azad University, where she had studied Islamic theology as well as secular philosophies, but she withdrew after two semesters of study for two reasons, one being a disagreement with her husband Amir and his family, and the other being the atmosphere and the pressure of the authorities towards her appearance and dress in the university. She was divorced, and according to her mother, had difficulty in finding work because of how employers perceived her.

Agha-Soltan was an aspiring underground musician, who was studying her craft through private voice and music lessons. She had studied the violin and had an as-yet-undelivered piano on order at the time of her death. She worked for her family's travel agency. It was in Turkey, more than two months prior to her death, that she met her fiancé, 37-year-old Caspian Makan, who worked as a photojournalist and filmmaker in Tehran, and after that she changed her mind about becoming a tour guide and decided to start photography with him. Agha-Soltan enjoyed travelling. She had studied Turkish, hoping it would aid her as a guide for Iranians on foreign tours in Turkey.

Those who knew her maintain that Agha-Soltan had not previously been very political – she had not supported any particular candidate in the 2009 Iran elections – but that anger over the election results prompted her to join the protest.

=== Confusion regarding identity ===
Her name is often miscited as "Neda Soltani". Neda Soltani is a different person, whose Facebook profile photo was mistakenly published in many articles about the incident. She tried in vain to remove her photo from the internet. Claims from both sides have been made, including claims from the Iranian government that she was the same person as Agha-Soltan and had faked her own death; and others who claimed that she was herself an agent of the Iranian government impersonating Agha-Soltan to sully her memory. Within two weeks, she had fled from Iran and was granted asylum in Germany in 2010.

== Circumstances of her death ==
On 20 June 2009, at around 6:30 p.m., Neda Agha-Soltan was sitting in her Peugeot 206 in traffic on Kargar Avenue in Tehran. She was accompanied by her music teacher, Hamid Panahi. They were on their way to participate in the protests against the results of the 2009 Iranian presidential election. The car's air conditioner was not working well, so she stopped her car some distance from the main protests and got out on foot to escape the heat. She was standing and observing the sporadic protests in the area when she was shot in the chest.

As captured on amateur video, she collapsed to the ground and was attended to by a doctor, her music teacher, and others from the crowd. Someone in the crowd around her shouted, "She has been shot! Someone, come and take her!" The videos were accompanied by a message from a doctor, later identified as Arash Hejazi, who said he had been present during the incident (but fled Iran out of fear of government reprisals):

At 19:05, on 20 June Place: Kargar Ave., at the corner crossing Khowsravi St. and Salehi St.

A young woman who was standing aside with her father [sic, later identified as her music teacher] watching the protests was shot by a Basij member hiding on the rooftop of a civilian house. He had clear shot at the girl and could not miss her. However, he aimed straight at her heart. I am a doctor, so I rushed to try to save her. But the impact of the gunshot was so fierce that the bullet had blasted inside the victim's chest, and she died in less than two minutes.

The protests were going on about one kilometre away in the main street and some of the protesting crowd were running from tear gas used among them, towards Salehi St. The film is shot by my friend who was standing beside me.

Her last words were, "I'm burning, I'm burning!" according to Panahi. She died en route to Tehran's Shariati hospital. However, the civilian physician who tended to Agha-Soltan in the video stated that she died on the scene. Hejazi, standing one metre away from her when she was shot, tried to stanch her wound with his hands. Hejazi said nearby members of the crowd pulled a man from his motorcycle while shouting: "We got him, we got him", disarmed him, obtained his identity card and identified him as a member of the Basij government militia. The militiaman was shouting, "I didn't want to kill her." The protesters let him go, but they kept the alleged killer's identity card and took many photographs of him. (Note: According to an eyewitness, Dr. Ārash Hejāzi.) An episode of This World that aired on 24 November 2009 contained a previously unseen clip of demonstrators capturing the militiaman seconds after the shooting.

According to Hejazi, the version of events according to authorities kept changing from saying "that she was alive. Then they said the footage was fake. One day they said a BBC reporter killed her. Then they said it was the CIA. Then they said the [Mujahedin] Khalq Organization [MKO] was behind it."

=== Videos ===
A frame from the video of Agha-Soltan's death by gunfire

The videos spread across the internet virally, quickly gaining the attention of international media and viewers. Discussions about the incident on Twitter, using a hashtag of #neda, became one of the "'trending topics'" by the end of the day on 20 June 2009. The incident was not originally reported by the state-controlled Iranian media, but was instead first reported on by international media. The video was shown on CNN and other news networks.

Agha-Soltan's death was "probably the most widely witnessed death in human history", according to Time magazine. The videos were awarded the George Polk Award for Videography in 2009.

== Alleged killer ==
The man accused by opposition sources of killing Agha-Soltan was identified as Abbas Kargar Javid, a Basij government militiaman, after photographs of the Basiji's ID cards appeared on the internet, according to The Times. Opposition critics and pro-government sources allege that Western intelligence agencies carried out the shooting.

== Aftermath ==
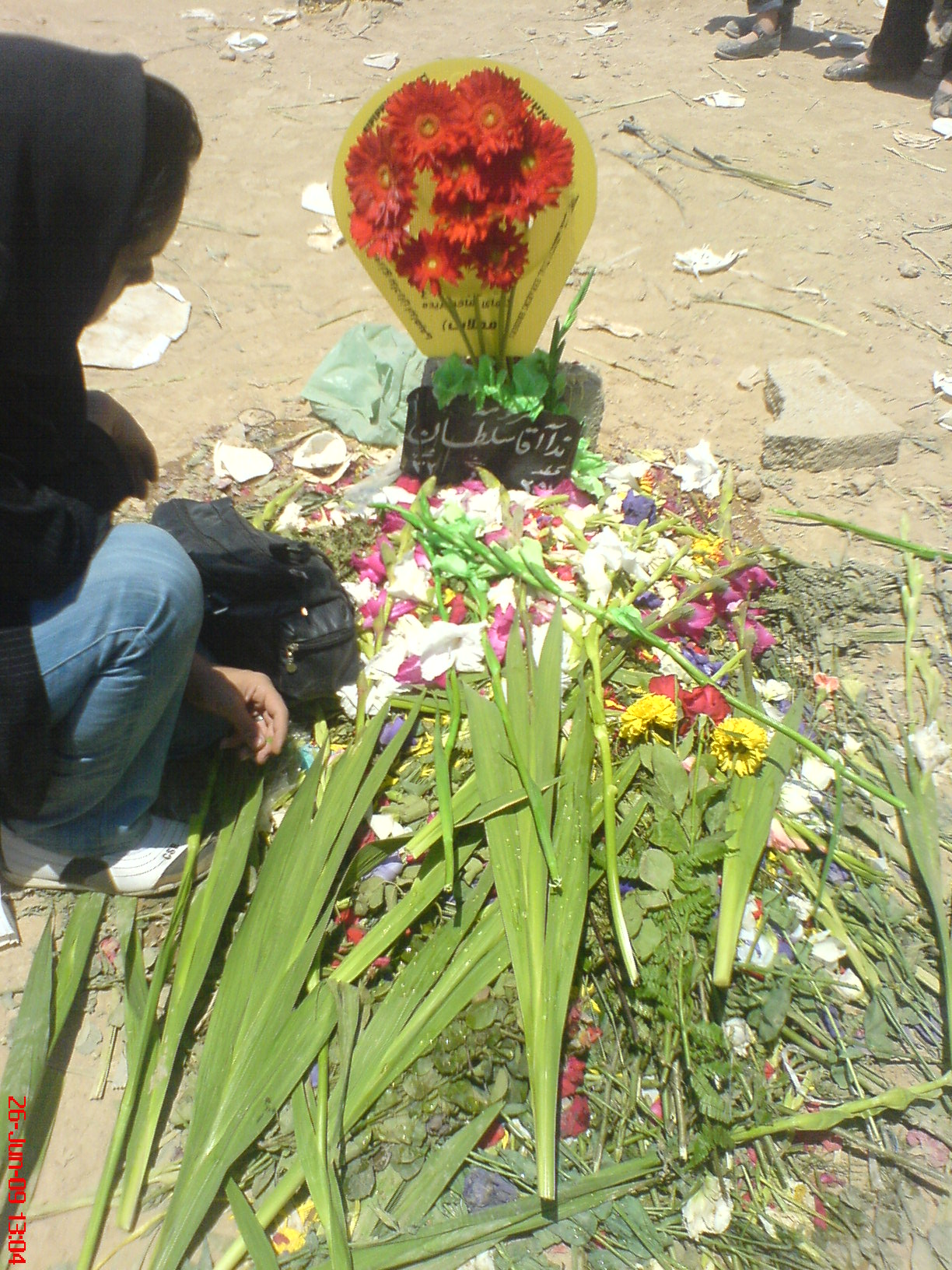
Grave site immediately following burial

After being pronounced dead at Shari'ati hospital, Agha-Soltan was buried at the Behesht-e Zahra cemetery in southern Tehran; she was denied a proper funeral by government authorities. Her family agreed to the removal of her organs for transplanting to medical patients. The Iranian government issued a ban on collective prayers in mosques for Agha-Soltan in the aftermath of the incident. Opposition figure Soona Samsami, the executive director of the Women's Freedom Forum, who was relaying information about the protests inside Iran to international media outlets, told the foreign press that Agha-Soltan's immediate family were threatened by authorities if they permitted a gathering to mourn her. Samsami stated, "They were threatened that if people wanted to gather there the family would be charged and punished."

Caspian Makan (Agha-Soltan's fiancé) told the BBC: "Neda had said that even if she lost her life and got a bullet in her heart, she would carry on." Pro-government activists have cited this as contradictory to the claim of not being involved in the protests and simply being in the area due to the breakdown of the air conditioning in her car.

Time and other news sources speculated that because of the widespread attention given to Agha-Soltan's story by social media networks and mainstream news organizations, she would be hailed as a martyr. There was also speculation that the Shi'ite cycle of mourning on the third, seventh, and 40th day after a person's death would give the protests sustained momentum, in similar fashion to the Iranian Revolution, where each commemoration of a demonstrator's death sparked renewed protests, resulting in more deaths, feeding a cycle that eventually resulted in the overthrowing of Iran's monarchy.

On 22 June, Iranian presidential candidates Mehdi Karroubi and Mir-Hossein Mousavi, who were contesting the validity of the election of Mahmoud Ahmadinejad, called upon Iranian citizens to commemorate Agha-Soltan. Karroubi announced his appeal on Facebook, asking demonstrators to gather in the center of the Iranian capital at 4:00 p.m. local time. The chief of the Tehran Police announced that his department had no involvement in the fatal incident. Later that day, riot police armed with live ammunition and tear gas dispersed a crowd of between 200 and 1,000 protesters who had gathered in Tehran's Haft-e Tir Square. The protests followed online calls for tribute to Āghā-Soltān and others killed during the demonstrations.

Cāspian Mākān, following Agha-Soltan's death, escaped to Canada. He visited Israel in March 2010 as a guest of Israel's Channel 2, and stated "I have come here out of the brotherhood of nations."

=== Funeral ===
About 70 mourners gathered outside Niloufar mosque in Abbas Abad, where the Agha-Soltan family attended services. A leaflet posted on the mosque's door read, "There is no commemoration here for Neda Agha-Soltan." Many in the crowd wore black. Some recited poems. After about ten minutes, paramilitary forces arrived on motorcycles and dispersed the attendees.

On 23 June, it was reported that, to prevent Agha-Soltan's family's home from becoming a place of pilgrimage, government authorities told the family to remove the black mourning banners from outside the home.

On 24 June, The Guardian reported the results of interviews of neighbours who said Agha-Soltan's family had been forced to vacate their apartment some days after her death. Reuters reported that supporters of presidential candidate Mir-Hossein Mousavi stated they would release thousands of balloons on 26 June 2009 with the message "Nedā you will always remain in our hearts" imprinted on them.

On 31 July 2009, the fortieth day from the killings of such youth as Neda Agha-Soltan, Sohrab Aarabi and Āshkān Sohrābi, a ceremony was held in Tehran where thousands of Iranians mourned for the loss of the victims. Reports also came of gatherings in the thousands in cities of Rasht, Shiraz and Mashad.

==== Grave desecration ====
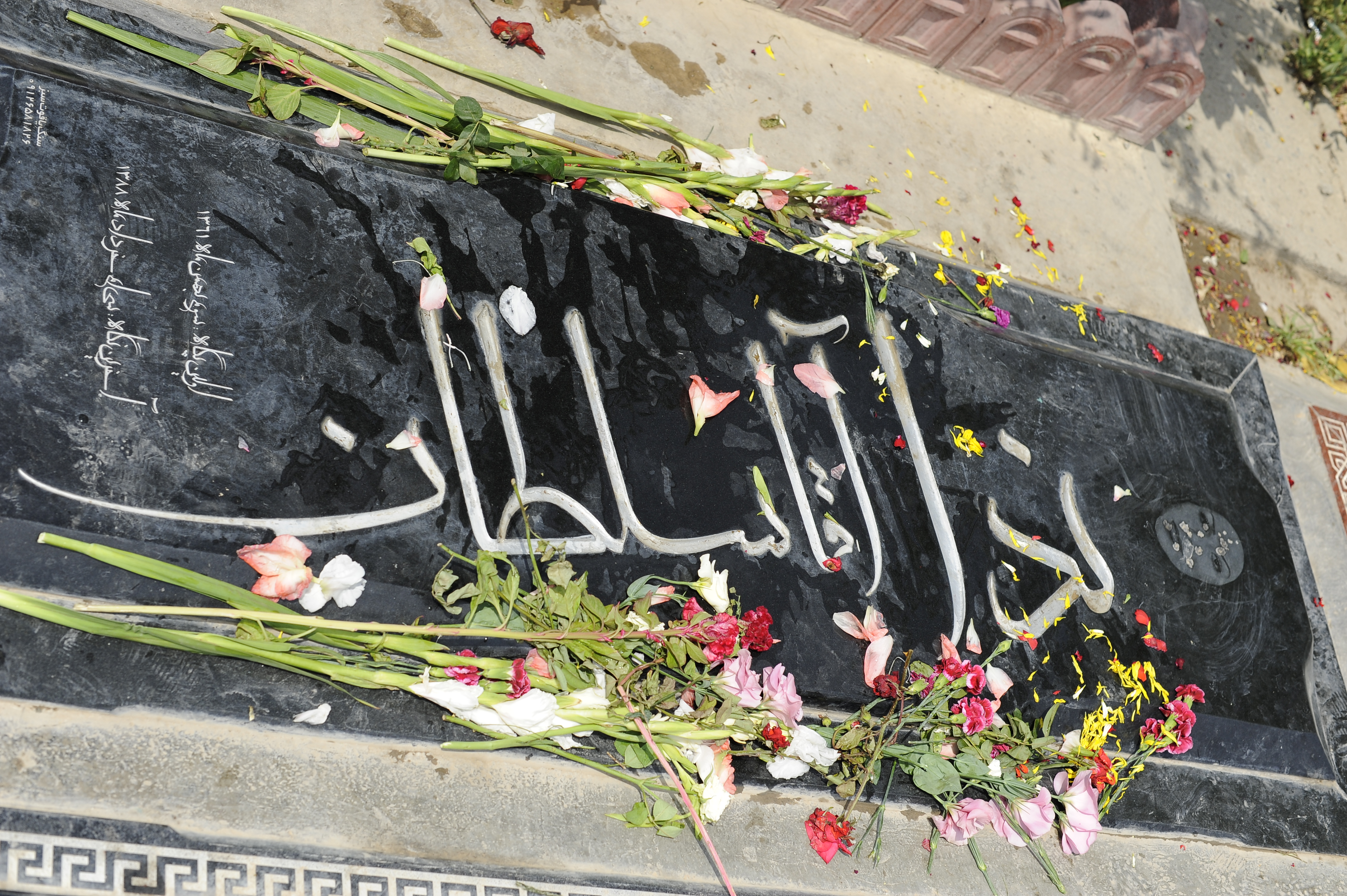
Neda Agha-Soltan's gravesite in Beheshte-Zahra, 2011

On 16 November 2009, supporters of the Iranian regime desecrated her grave and removed her gravestone. Later, on 31 December 2009, supporters of the Iranian government defaced the portrait on her grave by shooting at it multiple times.

=== CIA conspiracy theory ===
Iran's ambassador to Mexico, Mohammad Hassan Ghadiri, suggested in an interview on 25 June 2009 that the CIA could have been involved in Agha-Soltan's death. Ambassador Ghadiri questioned how the shooting was video taped so effectively, asserting that the incident occurred away from other demonstrations. He also stated that using a woman would be more effective in accomplishing the goals the CIA is purported to desire. Ambassador Ghadiri said "the bullet that was found in her head was not a bullet that you could find in Iran." (He thought she was shot in the head.) The account of Doctor Hejazi was that Agha-Soltan was shot in the chest from the front, as there was no exit wound, and the video evidence showed a wound to the chest. Hejāzi was the man seen in the video placing his hands on Agha-Soltan's chest to staunch her bleeding (as described above under section Circumstances of death). Wolf Blitzer was incredulous that Ghadiri would so boldly offer a conspiracy theory or obvious disinformation as an explanation:

BLITZER: ..You're a distinguished diplomat representing Iran. This is a very serious accusation that you're making, that the CIA was responsible for killing this beautiful, young woman. GHADIRI (through interpreter): I'm not saying that the CIA had done this. There are different groups. Could be intelligence services, could be CIA, could be the terrorists. However, these are the people who do these things. You could ask Mr. Andreotti, who was an Italian diplomat, whether Gladiators were a secret group related to CIA or not...

=== Claim of protester shooting ===
During his Friday sermon on 26 June, the Supreme Leader's appointed speaker, Ayatollah Ahmad Khatami, said "evidence shows that [protesters] have done it themselves and have raised propaganda against the system." Eyewitnesses at the scene of the shooting said Agha-Soltan was shot by a member of the pro-government Basij militia. Some of the eyewitnesses say she was shot from the ground, some say from the rooftop.

=== Arrest warrant for witness ===
Iran's police chief, brigadier general Ahmadi-Moghaddam told the press on 30 June 2009 that the Iranian police and Ministry of Intelligence filed an arrest warrant for Interpol to arrest Ārash Hejāzi, an eyewitness of Agha-Soltan's death, for poisoning the international atmosphere against the Iranian government and spreading misinformation about Agha-Soltan's death in his account of the incident to foreign news media.

== Iranian government's claims of video fabrication ==
Ezzatollah Zarghami, the head of Islamic Republic of Iran Broadcasting, told the press on 4 July 2009 that the videos of Nedā's death were all made by BBC and CNN.

In December 2009, Iranian state television aired a report about Agha-Soltan's death, portraying it as a western plot. In the programme, it was argued that Agha-Soltan simulated her death with accomplices, and that she was killed afterwards, having no knowledge of her partners' intentions.

=== Government pressure for confession ===
According to The Times, quoted from Mākān and Agha-Soltan's parents, officials tried to get them to confess that it was opposition protestors that had killed Nedā, and not government militiamen. They were given incentives such as declaring her to be a martyr and giving the family a pension if they complied. Makan and Agha-Soltan's family refused the offer. Panāhi was later forced by the government to change his story. The new version of events were retold by Panāhi on state television.

=== Accusation of security forces ===
In December 2009, her family accused the security forces of killing her, although even most western press accounts so far have stopped short of calling it a targeted political assassination. This was the strongest statement the family of Neda Agha-Soltan made since her death. This accusation followed the spread of an Iranian government-proposed theory blaming a "conspiracy of western governments" for the killing. Her father told the BBC's Persian service by telephone from Iran: "I openly declare that no one, apart from the government, killed Nedā. Her killer can only be from the government."

== Depiction in media ==
=== In Roger Waters: The Wall ===
A picture of Neda was shown among many other people during the song "The Thin Ice", in Roger Waters' The Wall concert tour and later in the film.

=== Scholarship ===
The Neda Agha-Soltan Graduate Scholarship is a scholarship for post-graduate philosophy students at The Queen's College, Oxford, with preference given to students of Iranian citizenship or heritage. The college received offers from two anonymous donors to establish a scholarship, followed by many individual donations from members of the public, former students of Queen's and others to reach the £70,000 needed to establish the scholarship on a permanent basis. The first recipient of the scholarship was Arianne Shahvis, a philosophy student of Iranian descent, who described the award as "a great honour". In November 2009, Iran's embassy in London sent a letter of protest to the college about the scholarship.

== See also ==
- Chain murders of Iran – a series of murders of dissident voices made to appear as accidents and suicides
- Sohrab Aarabi
- Taraneh Mousavi
- Killing of Khaled Mohamed Saeed
- Killing of Hamza Ali al-Khateeb
- Killing of Mahsa Amini
