= Mohsen Rouholamini =

Iranian death in police custody (1984–2009)

Mohsen Rouholamini Najafabadi (Persian: محسن روح‌الامینی نجف‌آبادی ;20 May 1984 – July 2009) was a graduate student in the computer engineering department at the University of Tehran. He died in July 2009 at the Kahrizak detention center following his arrest in connection with protests of the 2009 presidential election in Iran. Rouholamini was the son of Abdolhossein Rouholamini, a prominent Iranian principlist and adviser to presidential candidate Mohsen Rezaee.

== Death ==
Rouhalamini was arrested on 9 July 2009 in connection with protests over the 2009 presidential election in Iran and reportedly taken to the Kahrizak detention center. Tehran's prosecutor as of then, claimed that Mohsen Rouholamini, alongside other inmates, were taken to Kahrizak detention centre due to the lack of space for the inmates in Evin Prison, according to the tehran times. Two weeks later he was taken to a hospital where he died. His family reported that he died of cardiac arrest and bleeding in his lungs, and that "his face had been smashed." Police initially suggested that his death was caused by meningitis, but according to the semiofficial Mehr news agency, an Iranian medical examiner found that he had died of "physical stress, the effects of being held in bad conditions, multiple blows and severe injuries to the body." According to the guardian, Rouholamini's family was led to believe that he was going to be released, days before they were shocked by his death.

According to human rights groups, he was one of "at least three protesters" to die after being detained at Kahrizak, but his father's influence has drawn attention to the issue of abuse of protest prisoners, as "conservative Iranian lawmakers and politicians" expressed anger over the death. Supreme Leader Ali Khamenei is reported to have ordered an investigation into his death, and soon afterwards to have ordered the closure of Kahrizak. According to Mehr News Agency, the Iranian Supreme Leader ordered the closure of the Kahrizak detention center because it was nonstandard.
