= 2009 Iranian presidential election protests =

Protests against Mahmoud Ahmadinejad declared

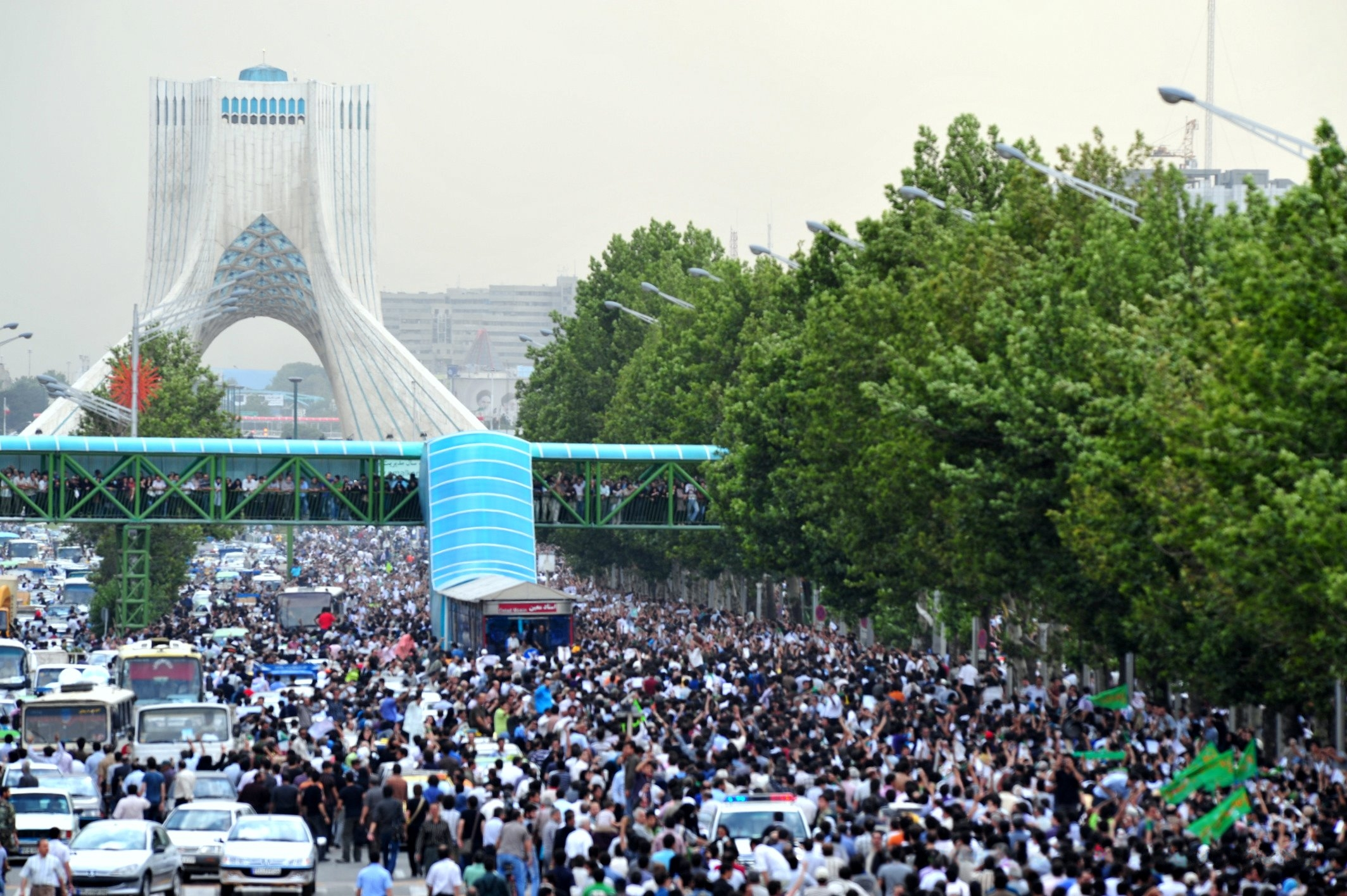
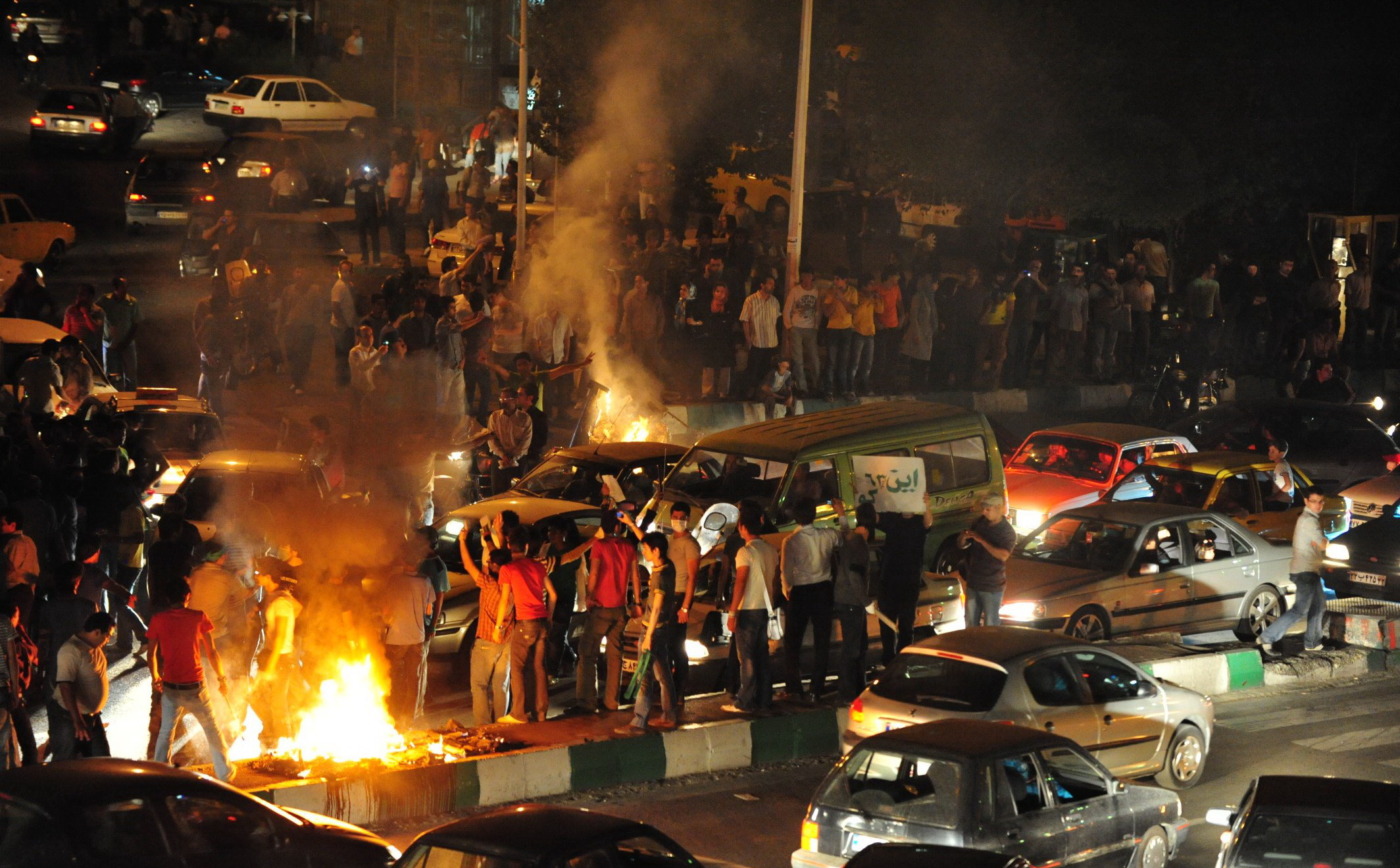
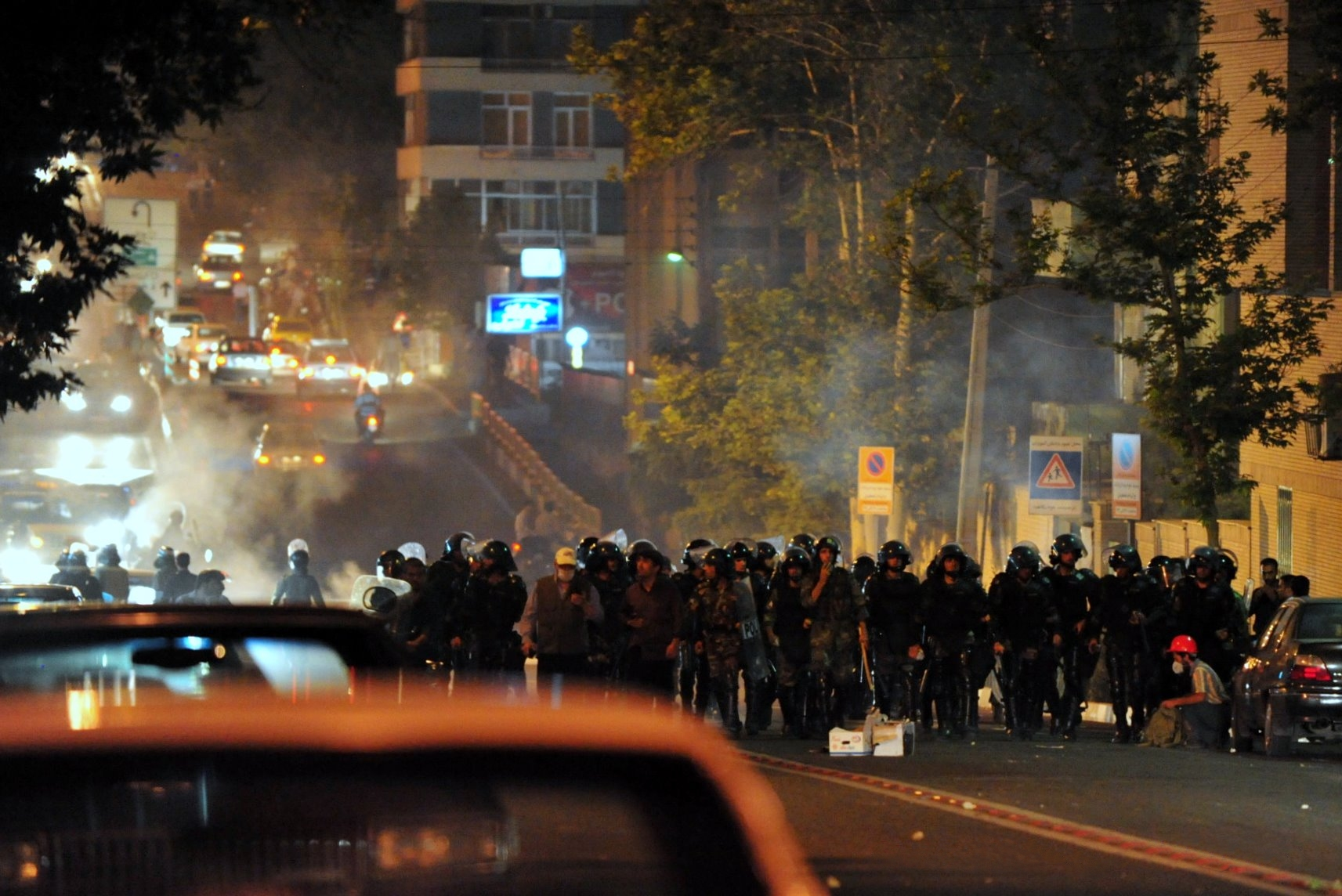
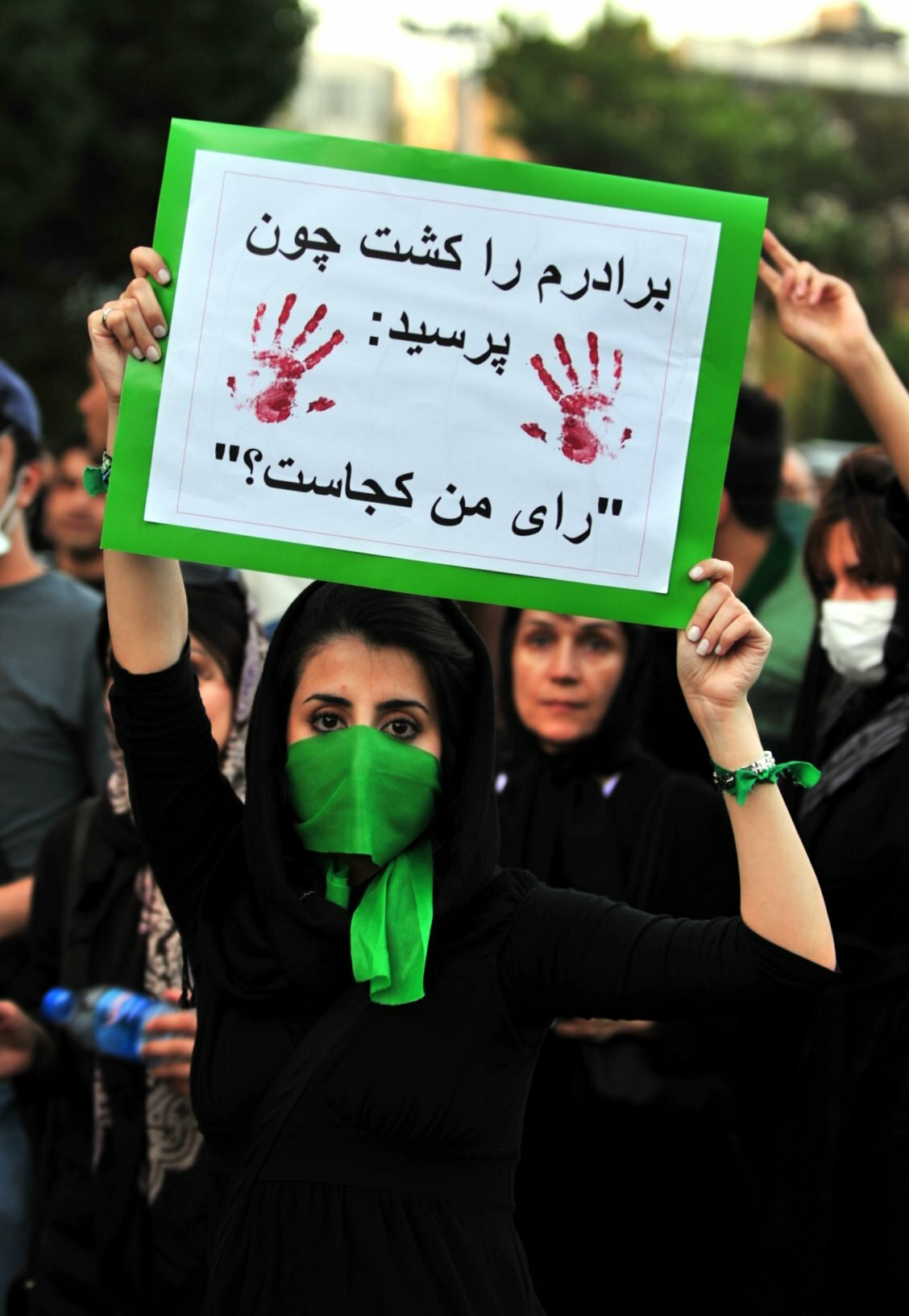
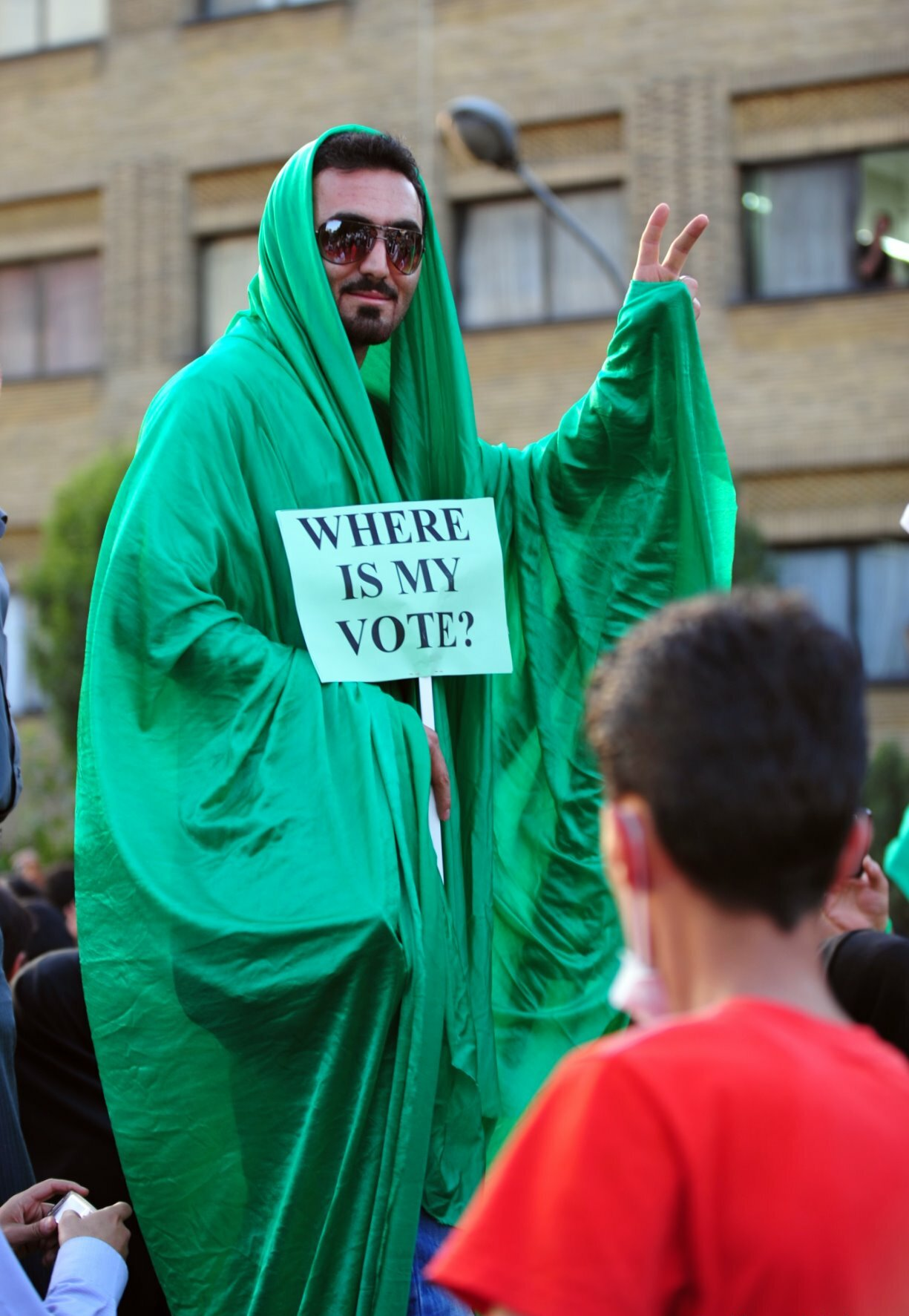
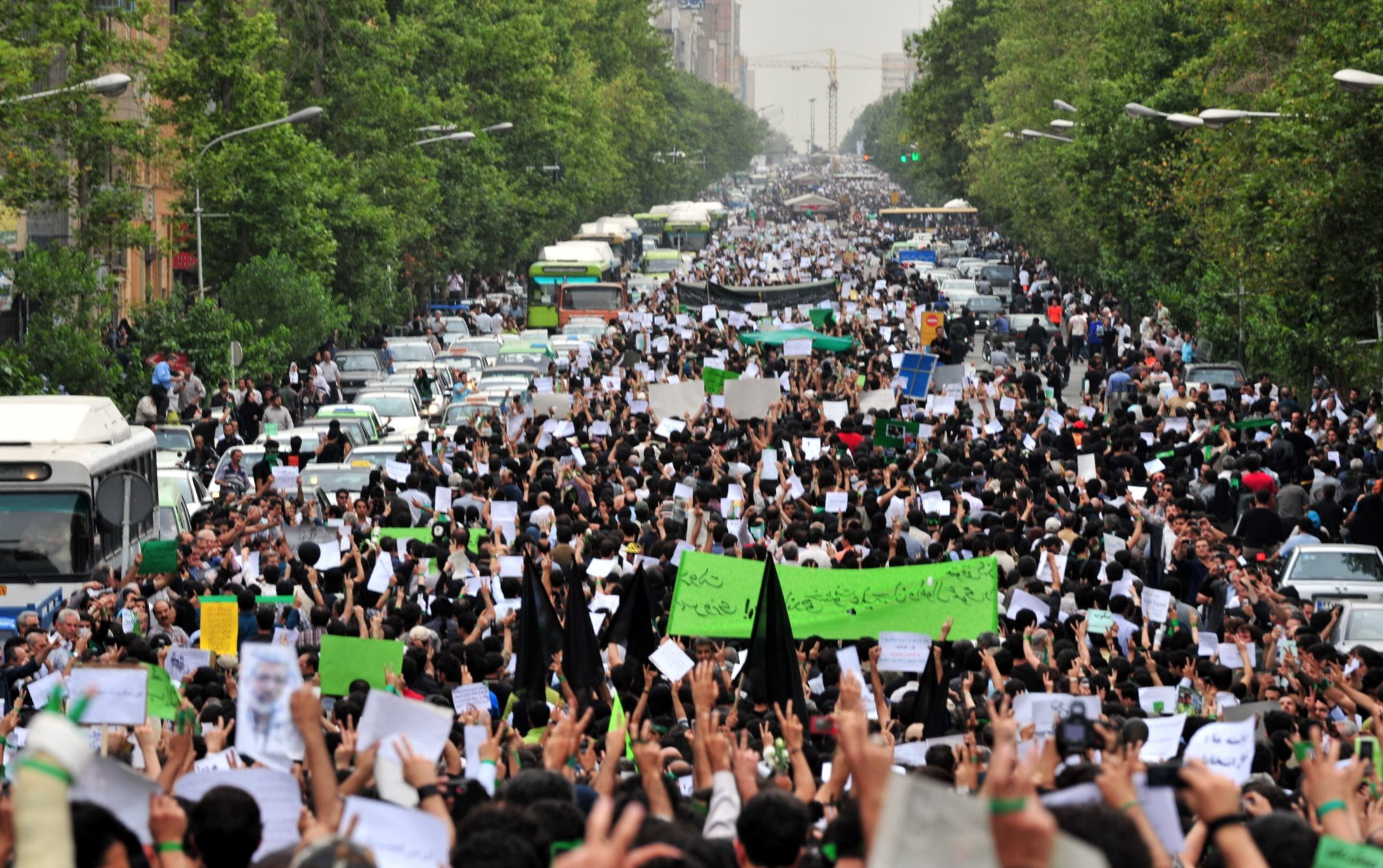
- Iranians protesting in Valiasr Square in the capital Tehran
- Date: 13 June 2009 – 7 December 2010
- Location: Iran: Tehran, Abadan, Ahvaz, Arak, Ardabil, Bandar Abbas, Birjand, Bojnord, Borujerd, Dezful, Sari, Babol, Bandar Torkaman, Bushehr, Hamadan, Isfahan, Ilam, Karaj, Kashan, Kerman, Kermanshah, Khorramshahr, Khoy, Mashhad, Najafabad, Qazvin, Qom, Rasht, Sanandaj, Shahr Kord, Shiraz, Tabriz, Urmia, Yasuj, Yazd, Zabol, Zanjan, Zahedan Around the world United States: Atlanta, Charlotte, Cincinnati, Preston, Iowa, Dallas, Denver, Houston, Indianapolis, Irvine, Kansas City, Las Cruces, Las Vegas, Los Angeles, Madison, Miami, Minneapolis, New York City, Orlando, Philadelphia, Portland, San Diego, San Francisco, San Jose, Seattle, State College, Tempe, Washington, D.C. Canada: Calgary, Edmonton, Halifax, Hamilton, London, Montreal, Ottawa, Toronto, Vancouver, Waterloo; Germany: Berlin, Bochum, Cologne, Dortmund, Düsseldorf, Frankfurt, Hamburg, Hannover, Heidelberg, Münster, Stuttgart; Sweden: Stockholm, Gothenburg, Malmö, Skellefteå, Karlstad, Sundsvall, Uppsala, Helsingborg, Umeå, Jönköping, Uddevalla, Borås; Netherlands: The Hague, Amsterdam, Delft, Leiden, Groningen, Maastricht, Italy: Rome, Milan, Turin, Florence; Switzerland: Geneva, Lausanne, Zürich, Bern; Australia: Sydney, Melbourne, Canberra, Adelaide; Spain: Barcelona, Madrid; Ukraine: Kyiv, Kharkiv; United Kingdom: London, Edinburgh, Glasgow, Manchester, Sheffield, Nottingham, Bristol; France: Paris, Lyon; Belgium: Brussels, Leuven; New Zealand: Auckland, Wellington, Christchurch; Malaysia: Kuala Lumpur; Portugal: Lisbon; Austria: Vienna, Salzburg; Romania: Bucharest; Hungary: Budapest; Czech Republic: Prague; Japan: Tokyo, Yokohama, Osaka, Kyoto, Nagoya; Denmark: Copenhagen, Aarhus; Norway: Oslo, Bergen, Trondheim, Stavanger, Arendal, Kristiansand; South Korea: Seoul, Busan, Daegu; Armenia: Yerevan; Israel: Tel Aviv; United Arab Emirates: Dubai; Turkey: Istanbul, Ankara; Pakistan: Islamabad, Karachi, Lahore, Peshawar; Egypt: Cairo; Kuwait: Kuwait City; Greece: Athens; Cyprus: Nicosia; Bulgaria: Sofia; Azerbaijan: Baku; Poland: Warsaw; Finland: Helsinki; Ireland: Dublin; Singapore: Singapore; India: Hyderabad; Bangladesh: Dhaka; Philippines: Manila
- Caused by: Alleged voting fraud and irregularities
- Goals: Election transparency, recall of Mahmoud Ahmadinejad from office
- Methods: Demonstrations; Riots; Arsons; Civil disobedience; Strike actions; Student activism; Internet activism
- Result: Protests quelled

Parties
Iranian Green Movement: The Green Path of Hope; Council for Coordinating the Reforms Front; Political parties: Islamic Iran Participation Front; Mojahedin of the Islamic Revolution of Iran Organization; National Trust Party	(Iran) Government; Cabinet of Ahmadinejad; Islamic Revolutionary Guard Corps; Police Command; State-sponsored foreign militia

Lead figures
Mir-Hossein Mousavi; Mehdi Karroubi; Hussein-Ali Montazeri #	(Iran) Ali Khamenei; (Iran) Mojtaba Khamenei (allegedly); (Iran) Mahmoud Ahmadinejad; (Iran) Saeed Jalili; (Iran) Sadegh Mahsouli; (Iran) Mohammad Ali Jafari; (Iran) Esmail Ahmadi-Moghaddam

Casualties and losses
- 36 killed (Iranian Government figure); 72 killed (Opposition figure); 4,000 arrests

After incumbent president Mahmoud Ahmadinejad declared victory in the 2009 Iranian presidential election, protests broke out in major cities across Iran in support of opposition candidates Mir-Hossein Mousavi and Mehdi Karroubi. The protests continued until 2010, and were titled the Iranian Green Movement by their proponents, reflecting Mousavi's campaign theme, and Persian Awakening, Persian Spring or Green Revolution.

Protests began on the night of 12 June 2009, following the announcement that incumbent President Mahmoud Ahmadinejad won nearly 63 percent of the vote, despite several reported irregularities. However, all three opposition candidates claimed the votes were manipulated and the election was rigged, with Rezaee and Mousavi lodging official complaints. Mousavi announced he "won't surrender to this manipulation", before lodging an official appeal against the result to the Guardian Council on 14 June. Ayatollah Ali Khamenei ordered an investigation into the claims of electoral fraud and irregularities, as requested by Green Movement leaders. Ahmadinejad called the election "completely free" and the outcome a "great victory" for Iran, dismissing the protests as akin to little more than "passions after a soccer match".

Due to the sporadic cases of violence present at the protests, the government had the police and paramilitary Basij violently suppress them; protesters were beaten, pepper sprayed, arrested and tortured, and even shot in some cases. The most widely known firearm victim was Neda Agha-Soltan, whose last moments were uploaded to YouTube and broadcast around the world. Opposition groups also reported thousands more were arrested and tortured in prisons around the country, with former inmates alleging mass rape of men, women, and children by the Islamic Revolutionary Guards in prisons such as Kahrizak and Evin. The Iranian government confirmed the deaths of 36 people during the protests, while unconfirmed reports by Mousavi supporters allege at least 72 deaths (over twice as many) in the three months following the election. They claimed relatives of the deceased were forced to sign documents citing death by heart attack or meningitis. Iranian authorities closed universities in Tehran, blocked websites, cut off mobile signals and banned rallies.

The creation of the Iranian Green Movement developed during these protests. It was also termed the "Twitter Revolution", due to protesters' reliance on Twitter and other social media to communicate.

== Background ==
=== Prior to 2005 ===
Since 1980 following the collapse of the Shah's regime in 1979. The government is based on the concept of Velayat-e Faqih, which is a system of governance in which a faqih was to serve as the Supreme Leader. However, following calls that this idea was undemocratic, the system was moderately altered into the current "Islamic Republic", in which a council of clerics, who are elected by the people, choose the Supreme Leader who, per the constitution, has to be a cleric (though this was altered in 1988). The Supreme Leader, in turn appoints the members of the twelve member Guardian Council, who approve laws and candidates for elections, even at the presidential level. The President of Iran is not the commander-in-chief, and the control of the military, police, and the parallel Revolutionary Guards is under the control of the Supreme Leader. The Revolutionary Guards is a constitutionally protected paramilitary force that operates alongside the regular Armed forces, whose primary function is to protect the Islamic Republic. The Revolutionary Guards also have an auxiliary wing called the Basij, who provide support in enforcing religious laws and suppressing dissidents. They are not considered full members of the Revolutionary Guards, and lack the training given to full-time members, although they can be called up at any time to assist the regular forces in times of trouble. Though Ayatollah Khomeini and his successor Ayatollah Khamenei, claimed that this system was democratic and the Revolutionary guards are necessitated to protect the government from military coups and foreign interference, critics contend that this system only serves to keep like-minded conservatives in power and marginalize any opposition, while using the Revolutionary guards to silence any dissidents.

The Islamic Republic has not escaped popular opposition in the past. During the 1980s, the People's Mojahedin Organization of Iran was instrumental in opposing Ayatollah Khomeini through large protests and bombings against politicians such as Mohammad-Ali Rajai, Shahid Beheshti, and Khamenei himself, who escaped an assassination attempt that left his right arm paralyzed. Following the 1981 Hafte Tir bombing, Ayatollah Khomeini declared the Mojahedin and anyone opposed to the Islamic republic, "enemies of god" and pursued a mass campaign of torture, rape, and execution against members of the Mojahedin, Fadaiyan, and Tudeh parties as well as their families, close friends, and even anyone who was accused of insufficient Islamic behavior, resulting in the deaths of thousands of Iranians who were usually tried in secret kangaroo courts run by hard line clerics. Following Operation Mersad in 1988, Khomeini ordered all prisons to execute those still in captivity, resulting in an estimated 3,000 to 30,000 dead. Since then, no organized opposition has surfaced in Iran and following this experience, the Iranian Government usually employs heavy handed tactics to marginalize any attempt at regime removal and usually justifies this with the "enemy of god" classification.

In 1997, following the unexpected victory of a before-little-known reformist cleric Mohammad Khatami, there was a revival of a moderate faction within the government whom the public believed had the ability to reform and curb the power of the conservatives and make the system somewhat democratic, and that Khamenei was willing to trust this faction in the hopes that it could recover the country after the eight-year war with Iraq, which Rafsanjani and the conservatives had failed to do. However, rather than promoting a reform of the system, the reformists began questioning the concept of the Islamic republic itself and following the exposure of the murders of dissidents by the intelligence services in reformist newspapers (which were run by former Revolutionary Guards and intelligence agents now turned reformists), the government began to distrust Khatami and his faction, a conflict which reached the breaking point after the 1999 student protests, after which hardliners such as Mohammad Ali Jafari, Mohammad Bagher Ghalibaf, and Qasem Soleimani were promoted to take control of the Revolutionary Guards and the Security Services to crack down on most reformist movements. Despite reformists gaining a majority in the Majlis in 2000 and Khatami winning the 2001 election as well, Khamenei would oppose any attempts at liberalization of the government or society. Most Iranians and observers in general have regarded the reform movement to have been a failure with Saeed Hajjarian, the main theorist behind the movement, declaring in 2003 that "the reform movement is dead. Long live the reform movement".

=== Ahmadinejad's first term ===
In 2005, Tehran Mayor Mahmoud Ahmadinejad was elected to the presidency, defeating now reformist Ali-Akbar Rafsanjani, placing the conservatives in charge of the government once more. Ahmadinejad would focus his presidency on confronting Israel. His speeches gained international infamy, which usually called for the destruction of Israel and claimed that the Holocaust was fabricated. The funding of anti-Israeli groups went up exponentially, particularly towards Hamas and Hezbollah, which have been labeled as terrorist groups by the United States. Despite Iran's huge oil and gas reserves, those sectors have been relatively neglected in favor of a nuclear energy program that has cost billions of dollars and has been condemned by Israel and the United States, who claim that the program is a cover up for a much larger nuclear weapons program. As a result, the United Nations has placed sanctions on the Iranian government, which has had a heavy impact on the economy, reducing the value of the Iranian Rial from a low of 8,000 to the dollar in 2005 to 10,000 to the dollar in 2009.

Iran has been experiencing high birth rates since 1988, both due to an increase in standard of living and government encouragement of large families, with an estimated 60 percent of the country being under the age of 30. However, the economy has failed to keep pace with the number of people entering the job market and Iran has been experiencing high unemployment rates since early 2000. Ahmadinejad began a campaign of privatization of state enterprises, but most companies ended up in the hands of government-connected officials and foundations (bonyads) operated by wealthy clerics and the Islamic Revolutionary Guards Corps (IRGC). Estimates by the Los Angeles Times suggest IRGC has ties to over one hundred companies and annual revenue in excess of $12 billion, particularly in construction. The Ministry of Petroleum awarded IRGC billions of dollars in contracts as well as major infrastructure projects. Most government-issued contracts were awarded to these companies, and private enterprise in Iran has been struggling heavily against these groups.

=== The election ===
The election of the president of Iran in 2009 was preceded by many Iranian surveys and a survey by the US-based Terror Free Tomorrow organization. The Terror Free Tomorrow opinion poll, conducted from 11 to 20 May 2009, predicted the high participation and showed similar ratios for the candidates to the later official result, with over a quarter yet undecided. The many Iranian surveys show a wide range of differing results. An opinion in the New York Times claims that this is due to the high fluctuation among voters during the campaign season.

The election for presidency took place on 12 June 2009. Unlike the election in 2005, the 2009 election featured high participation. The results of the elections were announced only 2 hours after the end of the votes, which may seem impossible. The official results were rejected by all three opposition candidates, who claimed that the votes were manipulated and the election was rigged. The last presidential election had already been controversial, but this time it escalated. Candidates Mohsen Rezaee and Mousavi have lodged official complaints. Mousavi announced that he "won't surrender to this manipulation" before lodging an official appeal against the result to the Guardian Council on 14 June.

According to an analysis by Professor Walter R. Mebane Jr. from the Department of Statistics of the University of Michigan, considering data from the first stage of the 2005 presidential election produces results that "give moderately strong support for a diagnosis that the 2009 election was affected by significant fraud". The UK-based think-tank Chatham House also suspected fraud in the voting process for a number of reasons:

Reason	Description
More than 100%	In two Conservative provinces, Mazandaran and Yazd, a turnout of more than 100% was recorded.
No swing	At a provincial level, there is no correlation between the increased turnout, and the swing to Ahmadinejad. This challenges the notion that his victory was due to the massive participation of a previously silent Conservative majority.
Reformist votes	In a third of all provinces, the official results would require that Ahmadinejad took not only all former conservative voters, and all former centrist voters, and all new voters, but also took up to 44% of former Reformist voters, despite a decade of conflict between these two groups.
Rural votes	"In 2005, as in 2001 and 1997, conservative candidates, and Ahmadinejad in particular, were markedly unpopular in rural areas. [...] The claim that this year Ahmadinejad swept the board in more rural provinces in 2009 flies in the face of these trends."

== Timeline ==
On Saturday 13 June after election results announced that Ahmadinejad had won, supporters of Mousavi took to the streets to protest. The next day, protests grew, as did violence. On the night of 14 June the pro-Ahmadinejad Basij paramilitary group raided Tehran University, injuring many. On 15 June millions of protesters marched on Azadi street and Mousavi made his first post-election appearance.

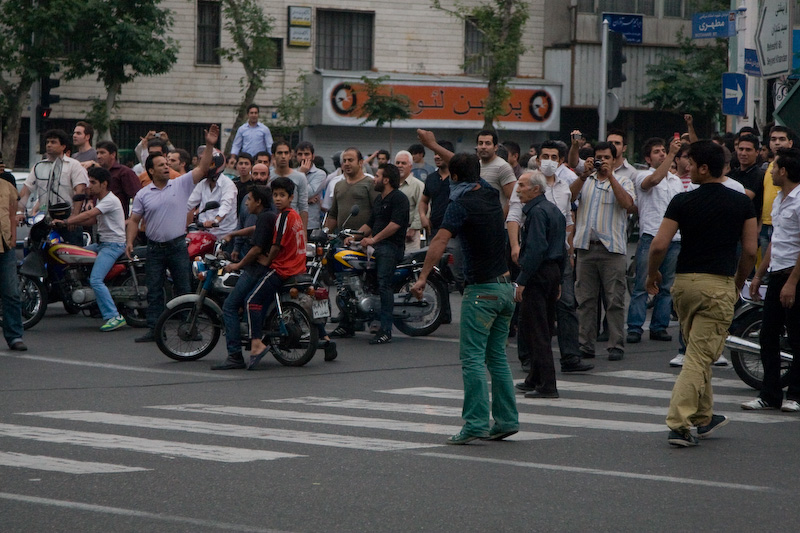
Protesters mobilising in Tehran before mass protests on 13 June

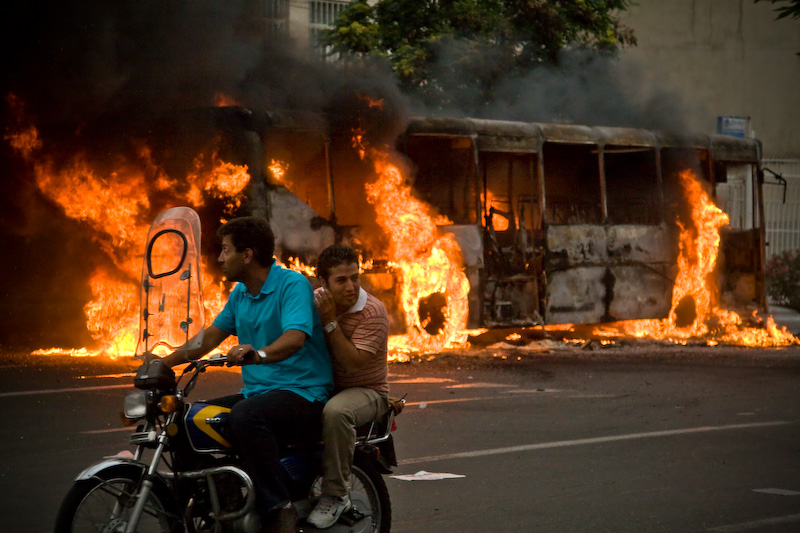
A bus burns on the streets of downtown Tehran as protesters cycle by on 13 June

On 16 June, protests continued, and the Guardian Council announced a partial recount would be conducted; however, the vote was not annulled. On Wednesday 17 June another large protest occurred; some members of the Iranian national football team wore green wristbands in support of Mousavi during their game against South Korea. On Thursday, 18 June more than 100,000 protesters held a candlelight vigil in Tehran following Mousavi's call for a day of mourning for those killed in protests. The Guardian Council invited the three major challengers to meet to discuss their grievances. Several protesters supporting Moussavi swapped their green clothes for black attires in honor of protesters who died, according to CNN.

On Friday, 19 June, Supreme Leader Ayatollah Ali Khamenei spoke during religious services, saying the election was legitimate and called the large voter turnout and resulting victory (for Ahmadinejad) a "divine assessment" and that protests would no longer be tolerated. However, the opposition did not accept this and the protests occurred, albeit on a smaller scale. The next day, 20 June, fewer protesters took to streets. At the protests that did occur, said to number in the tens of thousands of people, much violence occurred, causing many would-be protesters to stay in their homes the next day, Sunday, 21 June. On 20 June, a young Iranian woman, identified as Neda Agha-Soltan, was shot and died in front of cameras on Kargar Avenue in Tehran. Highly graphic amateur videos of the killing rapidly spread viral across the Internet after being posted to Facebook and YouTube. On 22 June, riot police broke up the main rally in Tehran with tear gas and live fire into the air.

During Friday, 26 June, prayers were broadcast live on television, and Ahmad Khatami is reported to have said that "Anybody who fights against the Islamic system or the leader of Islamic society, fight him until complete destruction" and called for the execution of leading demonstrators as they are "people who wage war against God".

On Monday, 29 June, the Guardian Council certified the results of the controversial election. This set off a wave of protests, disregarding the Iranian government's ban on street marches. The Iranian intelligence chief alleged that western and "Zionist" forces were responsible for inciting the protests. Four of the nine British officials arrested on 28 June 2009 remain in custody under those charges. According to Aljazeera, the arrest of the British officials was described by the Britain as harassment and intimidation, as well as urging their release.

Late July, protest had reportedly entered a "Phase II", using tactics such as the boycott of goods advertised on state-controlled television; attempting to deny power to state-run TV evening news broadcasts by turning on all electric appliances just before the news; "blitz" street demonstrations "lasting just long enough to chant 'Death to the dictator!' several times", but not long enough for security forces to arrive; identifying paramilitary Basij vigilantes linked to the crackdown and putting marks in the opposition color green, or pictures of protest victims in front of their homes; scribbled anti-regime slogans on money. The new protest is reportedly based on the idea of Mohandas Gandhi that "even the most powerful cannot rule without the cooperation of the ruled." Iranian authorities, in an attempt to stop Moussavi's supporters from hosting a news conference, sealed off his campaign headquarters, according to the BBC.

On 5 August, Mahmoud Ahmadinejad was sworn in for his second term as President of Iran in an official inauguration in Tehran. Protests were held outside the Parliament during the inauguration, with protesters chanting "death to the dictator".

Major protests would continue after the inauguration as well. Among the largest were protests that were held on Iranian holidays, such as Quds Day on 18 September, 13th of Aban on 4 November and Iranian Students Day on 7 December. According to The Guardian, it was projected that more than 500,000 people participated in the 2009 presidential election protest. According to the Associated Press, it is speculated that the protests may be connected to the country's economy and corruption.

Another wave of protests occurred following these election protests across Iran in 2011.

== Government reaction ==
=== Arrests ===
On the weekend of 13/14 June, in a series of raids across Tehran, the government arrested over 170 people, according to police officials. Among them were prominent reformist politicians, including MIRO founder Behzad Nabavi, IIPF leader Mohsen Mirdamadi, and former president Mohammad Khatami's brother Mohammad-Reza Khatami, who was later released. Also arrested were Mostafa Tajzadeh and Mohsen Aminzadeh, whom the IRNA said were involved in orchestrating protests on 13 June. Unidentified sources said that the police stormed the headquarters of the IIPF and arrested a number of people. Iranian journalist Mashallah Shamsolvaezin claimed that presidential candidate Mir-Hossein Mousavi was put under house arrest, although officials denied this. An estimated 200 people were detained after clashes with students at the University of Tehran, although many were later released.

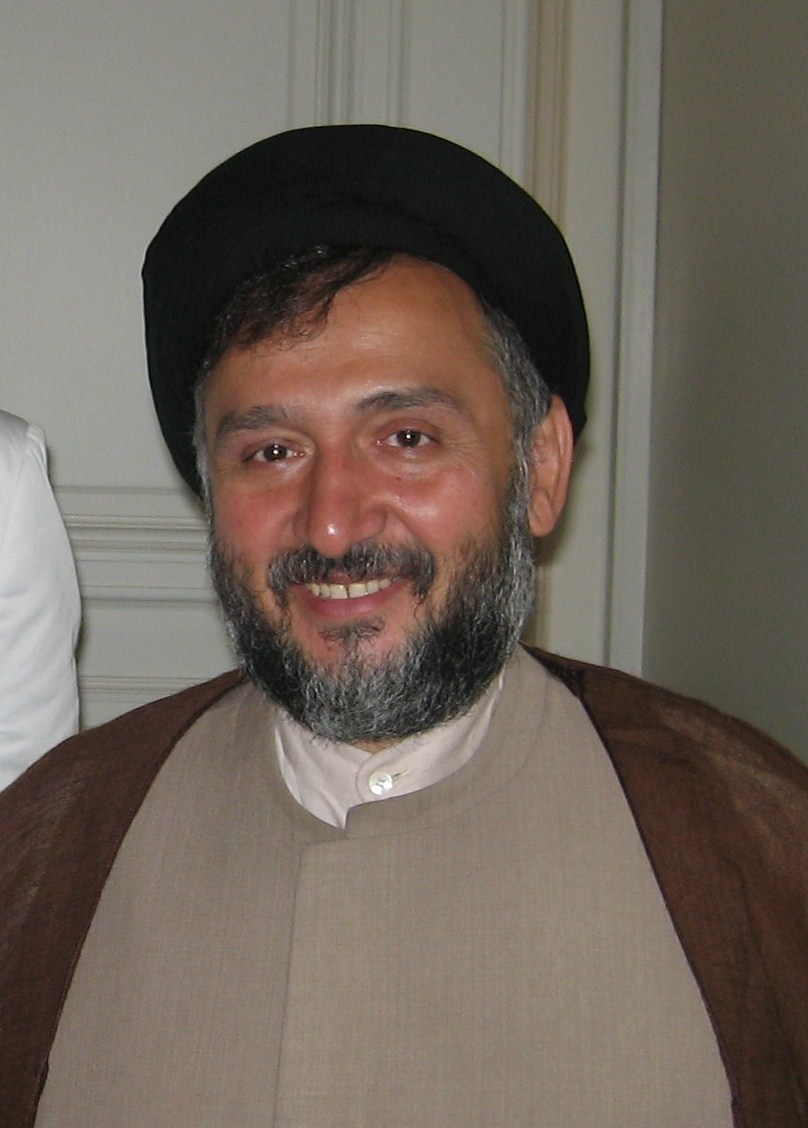
Former vice-president Mohammad-Ali Abtahi was among those arrested on 16 June, according to Reuters.

Acting Police Chief Ahmad-Reza Radan stated via the state press service on 14 June that "in the interrogation of related rebels, we intend to find the link between the plotters and foreign media". A judiciary spokesman said they had not been arrested, but that they were summoned, "warned not to increase tension", and later released. Intelligence minister Gholam Hossein Mohseni-Ejehei linked some arrests to terrorism supported from outside Iran, stating that "more than 20 explosive consignments were discovered". Others, he said, were "counter-revolutionary groups [who had] penetrated election headquarters" of the election candidates.

Relatives of several detained protesters have confirmed that the interrogation of prisoners is now being headed by Saeed Mortazavi, a figure already known for alleged involvement in brutal interrogations and torture.

Mojtaba Khamenei, the second son of Ayatollah Khamenei, has emerged as one of the driving forces behind the government's crackdown, diplomats and observers said. He is reported to have a strong influence over his father and is talked about as his possible successor. Mojtaba is affiliated with former Iranian president Mahmoud Ahmadinejad.

On 16 June, Reuters reported that former vice-president Mohammad-Ali Abtahi and former presidential advisor Saeed Hajjarian had been arrested. Human rights lawyer Abdolfattah Soltani, who had been demanding a recount of all votes, was also arrested on that Tuesday according to Shirin Ebadi, who said that security officials had posed as clients. Over 100 students were arrested after security forces fired tear gas at protesters at Shiraz University on the same day. Reporters Without Borders reported that 5 of 11 arrested journalists were still in detention as of 16 June, and that a further 10 journalists were unaccounted for and may have been arrested.

On 17 June, former foreign minister and Secretary-General of the Freedom Movement of Iran, Ebrahim Yazdi, was arrested while undergoing tests at the Tehran hospital. In Tabriz, other Freedom Movement activists and eight members of the IIPF were arrested, with reports of at least 100 civic figures' arrests. The total number of arrests across Iran since the election was reported as 500.

Aaron Rhodes, a spokesman for the international campaign for human rights in Iran, stated that "Iranian intelligence and security forces are using the public protests to engage in what appears to be a major purge of reform-oriented individuals whose situations in detention could be life-threatening".

In Esfahan Province, prosecutor-general Mohammadreza Habibi warned that dissidents could face the death penalty under Islamic law. He also accused the protesters of being a "few elements controlled by foreigners [who were] disrupting security by inciting individuals to destroy and to commit arson" and urged them to stop their "criminal activities". It was not clear if his warning applied only to Isfahan or to the country as a whole.

On 20 June, Committee to Protect Journalists reported that LIFE Magazine photographer Amir Sadeghi was arrested by Iranian authorities. According to a CPJ report, he was released from Evin Prison on 28 June.

On 21 June, Iranian officials detained Iranian-born, Canadian citizen, and Newsweek journalist Maziar Bahari. He was later forced to confess in a series of trials for the detained protesters.

On 22 June, The Guardian's live blog reported that at approximately 1:30 pm, General Ali Fazli, the newly appointed commander of the Revolutionary Guards in Tehran province, had been arrested for refusing to carry Khamenei's order to use force against demonstrators.

On 11 August 2009, the Iranian government confirmed that 4,000 were detained in the protests.

=== Militia violence ===
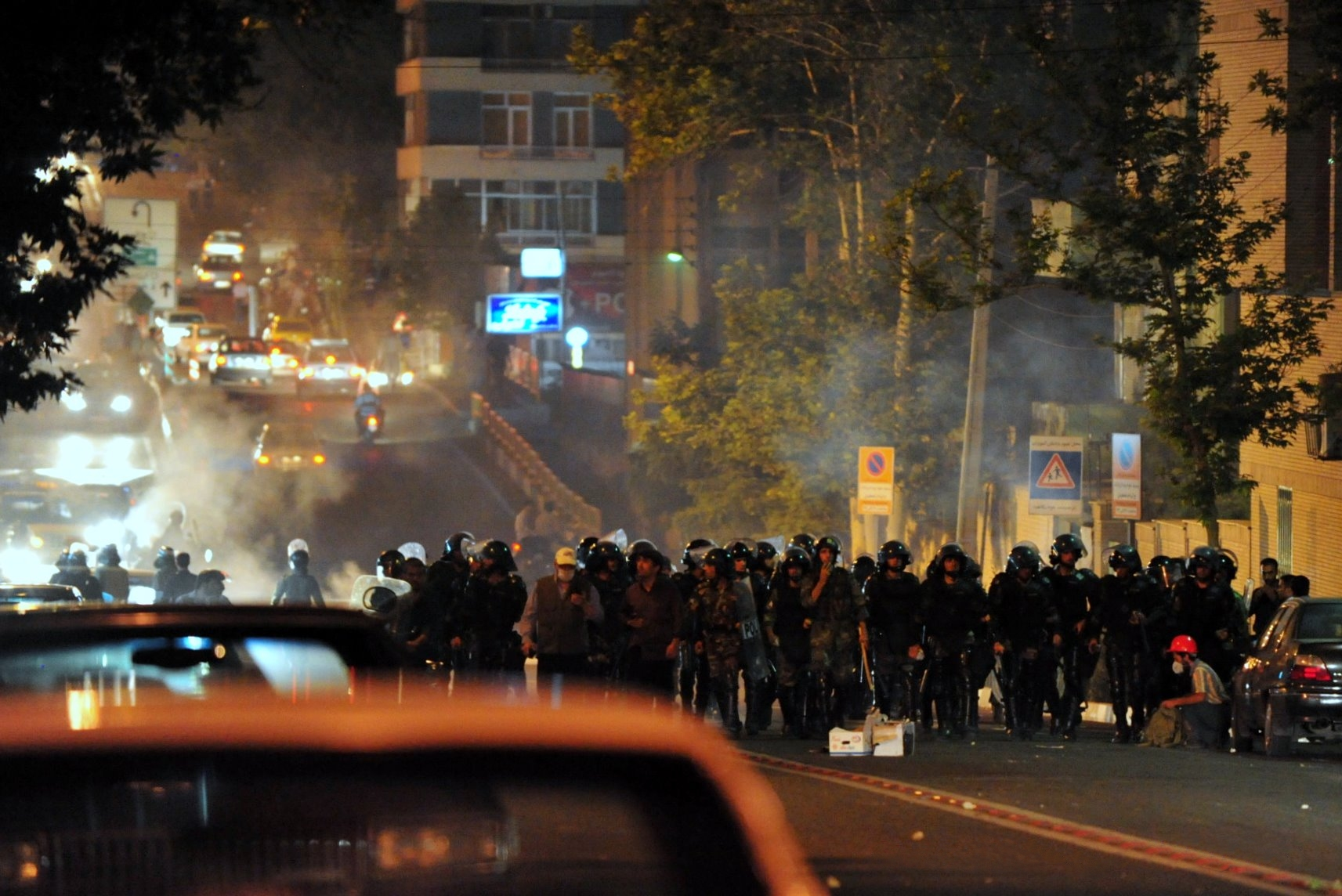
Riot police blocking a street in Tehran

Basij members were filmed firing into crowds and breaking into houses. A number of hospital staff protested after people were transported to the hospitals dead or in critical condition with gunshot wounds. The IRGC and the Basij also attacked Universities and students' dorms at night and destroyed property.

The Los Angeles Times reported that militiamen from the hard-line Iran-based Ansar-e Hezbollah group "warned that they would be patrolling the streets to maintain law and order".

==== Casualties ====
While the death of Neda attracted widespread media attention, The Guardian is also maintaining a list of numerous other people who have ostensibly been either killed or arrested since the election. The government has issued very little official information on who has been killed or arrested (except Neda Agha-Soltan, whose video circulated quickly on the Internet). Hospitals were prohibited from registering the dead bodies or injured people, as a medical student at Rasoul-Akram hospital witnessed on the night of 15 June: "Nine people died at our hospital and another 28 had gunshot wounds... [the government] removed the dead bodies on back of trucks, before we were even able to get their names or other information... No one was allowed to speak to the wounded or get any information from them." Hospital staff protested due to the restrictions. The government admitted to at least 27 fatalities in Tehran, while CNN and other news organizations reported 150 unconfirmed casualties from 20 June protests. International Campaign for Human Rights in Iran counted 34 of them, claiming to have eyewitness reports of much higher numbers. Human rights activists in Iran called for independently collecting information about the killed, injured, and arrested people.

Among those who were killed by the government forces, names such as Sohrab Aarabi, Naser Amirnejad, Masoud Hashemzadeh, and Mohammad Kamrani are confirmed. Among them, the death of Sohrab Aarabi received special news attention, after Mousavi and Karroubi visited his family.

The families of those who died were allegedly subjected to penalties and bureaucratic red tape, such as being asked to sign paperwork that they do not have complaints against the government prior to being allowed to claim bodies. When the death was due to gunshot wounds, some were reportedly asked to pay a $3,000 fee, ostensibly for the bullet used by security forces. Restrictions on burial locations have also been reported, and the Iranian government did not permit a memorial service for Neda Agha-Soltan. Time speculates that the Shi'ite cycle of mourning on the third (23 June), seventh (27 June), and 40th (30 July) day after a person's death may give the protests sustained momentum, similar in fashion to what occurred during the 1979 Iranian Revolution.

==== Torture of prisoners ====
Opposition leaders have claimed that the prisoners have been tortured and raped in prison. Opposition leaders and world leaders condemned the abuse. However, Iran's parliament speaker, Ali Larijani, denied that prisoners were abused.

Former chairman of Iranian parliament Mehdi Karroubi stated that male and female prisoners have been raped in the prison and their genitals were torn, but it is not yet proven. He asked the head of the assembly to investigate the issue in a letter to the head of Assembly of Experts. Iran's police chief, Gen. Ismail Ahmadi Moghaddam, acknowledged that the prisoners had been abused and raped.

Additionally, several of the detained died while in prison. Authorities claimed that the deaths were caused by "pre-existing conditions". However, examinations of the bodies showed signs of torture, including broken bones, finger nails torn off, and rape.

Iranian film maker Reza Allamehzadeh made a documentary about Azar Al-Kanan, a prominent Iranian human rights activist and former political prisoner in Iran who became one of the victims of torture, sexual abuse, and finally, rape. The documentary was released after ex-chairman of Iranian parliament Mehdi Karroubi called for investigation of sexual abuse of protesters in prisons by Iranian police and the judicial system, both under the responsibility of the Supreme Leader. Karroubi's letter angered conservatives and the head of Iranian parliament, Ali Larijani, and senior cleric and representative of the Supreme Leader, Ahmad Khatami, denied the reports of sexual abuse. Following the denials, on 16 August 2009, Fereshteh Ghazi, in an article in Rooz, wrote her story and described the torture and sexual violence in Iranian prison.

Testimonies from victims of rape by the Iranian regime's agents in jail can be downloaded here: Blogger

=== Censorship ===
==== News media ====
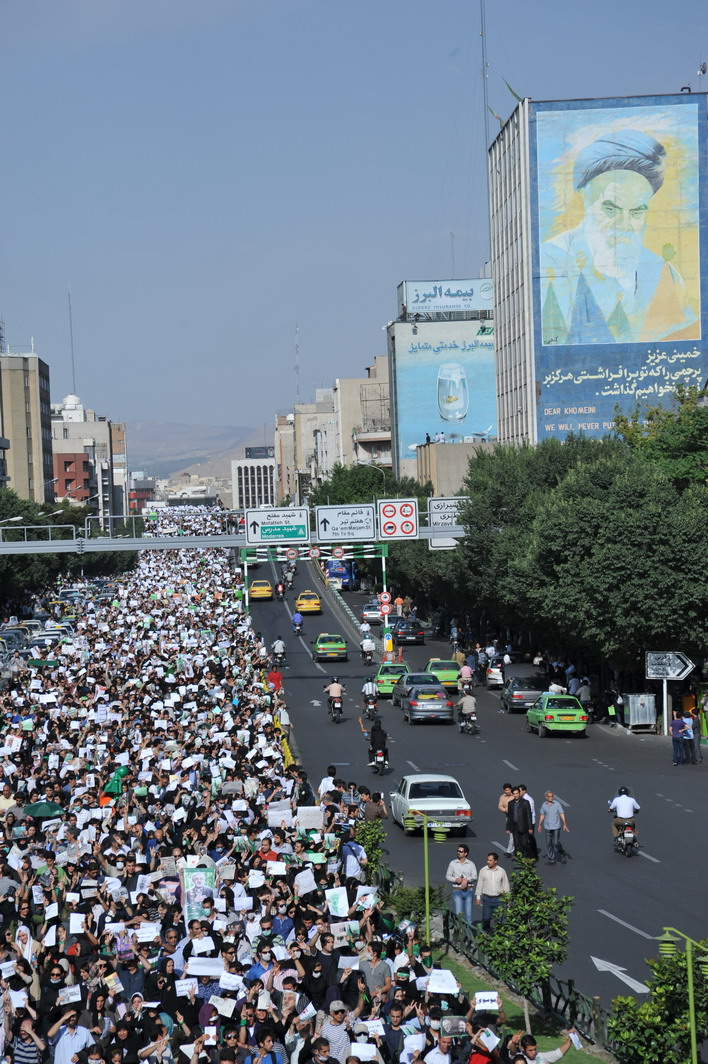
Silent demonstration from Hafte Tir Square to Enqelab Square, on Karim Khan Zand Street and Karim Khan Zand Bridge. Tehran, 16 June 2009

According to the Telegraph, on 14 June "Iran's regime was doing its utmost to choke off the flow of news from its capital". Al Jazeera English has leveled allegations of direct media censorship by the Iranian government, stating that "some of the newspapers have been given notices to change their editorials or their main headlines". The Al Arabiya's offices in Tehran were closed on 14 June for a week by Iranian authorities, who gave no explanation for the decision. NBC News offices in Tehran were raided, with cameras and other equipment confiscated. Meanwhile, the director of BBC World Service accused the Iranian Government of jamming its broadcasts to the country. Peter Horrocks said audiences in Iran, the Middle East, and Europe had been affected by an electronic block on satellites used to broadcast the BBC Persian Television signal to Iran, adding: "It seems to be part of a pattern of behaviour by the Iranian authorities to limit the reporting of the aftermath of the disputed election". A BBC corporate official has referred to the network's conflict with the regime as 'electronic warfare'.

On 15 June, Belgian national television reporter Jef Lambrecht from the Flemish public television broadcaster VRT and his sound technician, Vandervorst, were arrested in Tehran. They had been doing a story on the riots and had gotten caught in the middle of the violence. While Lambrecht had taken a punch, Vandervorst was arrested by riot police. When Lambrecht went to check where Vandervorst was being taken, he was promptly arrested as well. Both were taken to the Ministry of Information and detained in the basement. They were both released after two hours with strict instructions not to make any photos or film recordings of the protests. At the same time, two Dutch reporters from Nova were also arrested and deported.

On 16 June, the Ministry of Culture issued a directive banning all foreign media from leaving their offices. This directive stipulated that international news outlets could still talk about rallies in their live reports, however, they were not allowed to leave their hotel rooms and offices to witness the protests. Iranian government-run television was not affected by the restrictions. On 20 June, the Ministry of Culture intensified the restrictions by banning international media from reporting on the demonstrations altogether unless they received permission from Iranian authorities.

On 5 August, the Association of Iranian Journalists was forcibly closed when its offices in Tehran were raided by government security forces. The International Federation of Journalists released a statement criticizing the Iranian government for the forcible closure of the Association of Iranian Journalists and calling for freedom of the press.

BBC correspondent John Simpson was arrested, his material confiscated, and then released. Reporters from the Italian public television broadcaster RAI stated that one of its interpreters was beaten with clubs by riot police and the officers then confiscated the cameraman's tapes. ABC News reporter Jim Sciutto has also had material taken. People from the German public broadcasters ZDF and ARD have been harassed as well, with men carrying batons and knives reportedly storming the ARD's Tehran office and taking the technician for further questioning (who was released the day after).

Ahmadinejad responded to civil liberties concerns by stating Iranians enjoyed "absolute freedom" of speech. "Don't worry about freedom in Iran ... Newspapers come and go and reappear. Don't worry about it."

On 5 July 2009, the Sunday Times reported that the Iranian state media have been transmitting "confessions" by demonstrators against the alleged rigging of the presidential vote claiming they did so under the influence of the Voice of America, the BBC, and other foreign media agencies. Their faces have been obscured in the TV broadcasts, which the newspaper claims, after speaking to witnesses, is due to facial bruising resulting from torture whilst in custody, which included several instances of male rape.

==== Internet censorship ====
On Saturday following the elections, Mir-Hossein Mousavi's supporters started DDoS attacks against president Ahmadinejad's site and exchanged attack tools through sites such as Facebook and Twitter. After the attacks, the government stopped Internet access. On 13 June, as the election results were being announced, Iran shut down all Internet access for about 45 minutes, then restarted it apparently with lower bandwidth; this may have been in order to set up filters to block sites like YouTube that could be used for political purposes. When thousands of opposition supporters clashed with the police on 13 June, Facebook was filtered again. Some news websites were also blocked by the Iranian authorities. Mobile phone services including text messaging also had stopped or had become very difficult to use since the day before the election. Specifically, all websites affiliated with the BBC were blocked, as well as those affiliated with The Guardian. Iranian Internet users used social media to trade lists of open web proxy servers as a means of getting around the restrictions, but the Iranian authorities monitoring these media gradually blocked these proxies, so that after two weeks very few proxies were still working in Iran. Associated Press labeled the actions as "ominous measures apparently seeking to undercut liberal voices". An anti-censorship software, Freegate, developed by Global Internet Freedom Consortium, was widely used and proven effective. The software was developed by oversea Chinese scientists to allow mainland Chinese users to break through the "great firewall" in China, and was also found to be very effective in Iran.

Iran was known to operate one of the world's most sophisticated Internet filtering systems, with widespread blockades on specific websites. During the protests, operation of this system dramatically intensified. Yet, Iranian Green Movement online activists continued their political activism and resisting online repression by adopting different strategies such as: "(1) de-identification, (2) network reformation, (3) circumvention, (4) self-censoring, and (5) being inconspicuously active".

== Alleged foreign involvement ==
On 26 August, Ayatollah Ali Khamenei released a statement through Iranian state television. He said that although he did not believe opposition leaders were working as agents of foreign governments, he did believe that the protests were organized and planned, possibly without the knowledge of the Iranian political opposition. He said that "This plot was defeated, since fortunately our enemies still do not understand the issue in Iran", specifically pointing to foreign involvement in the protests.

On 16 June, Der Spiegel cited Voice of America as reporting that the Iranian government had recruited as many as 5,000 Lebanese Hezbollah fighters to clash with protesters. On 19 June, CNN reported that, according to media reports and online chatter, the Basij "seem to have added some Arabic-speaking members – suspected of being [Lebanese] Hezbollah fighters." In response, a spokesman for Hezbollah denied any involvement with the turmoil in Iran and stated that Hezbollah is not taking sides in what it considers to be an internal Iranian affair.

On 17 June, The Jerusalem Post quoted two Iranian protesters who claimed that "Palestinian forces" (which the article states are members of Hamas) were working with the Basij in helping crush the protests.

== Statements by Iranian figures ==
=== Government figures ===
- Supreme Leader Ayatollah Ali Khamenei ordered an investigation into the claims of electoral fraud. Referring to Mousavi's appeal letter about the irregularities, Khamenei said "the Guardian Council has been emphasised to carry out investigation into this letter carefully". On 19 June he condemned the conduct of the western world during elections, claiming the British monarchy as the most evil. This claim was immediately rejected by the UK foreign office as "unacceptable and not based in fact" and "a step too far". Two diplomats were expelled from the British embassy in Tehran, accused of being "involved in activities incompatible with their status". Gordon Brown informed the House of Commons on 23 June that the claims were "absolutely without foundation" and two diplomats of equal rank at Iran's embassy in London were to be expelled.
- Interior Minister Seyed Sadeq Mahsouli said he had not received a "written complaint" about election fraud or irregularities. He remarked the election proceeded in a way that "ruled out the possibility of cheating". He accused the US intelligence agency, the CIA, of helping and funding rioters in Iran: "Britain, America and the Zionist regime (Israel) were behind the recent unrest in Tehran" and "Many of the rioters were in contact with America, the CIA and the MKO and are being fed by their financial resources".
- Chairman of the Assembly of Experts, Akbar Hashemi Rafsanjani, was reported to have called a meeting of the Assembly, as they have the constitutional power to elect and dismiss the Supreme Leader.
- Speaker of Parliament Ali Larijani condemned the attack by police and militia at Tehran University, stating the "Interior Minister is responsible in this regard".
- The Iranian Minister of Intelligence said in a TV interview he is not in favor of anyone spending even a night in prison or getting hurt, but his ministry is charged with maintaining law and order. He said there is no real possibility of a velvet revolution in Iran, although he accused the U.S. and Britain of trying to orchestrate one. He disclosed people such as Ramin Jahanbaglou and Haleh Esfandiari were arrested in connection with inciting the Iranian intelligentsia into such plots. Due to legal complications, no prosecution took place.

=== Candidates ===
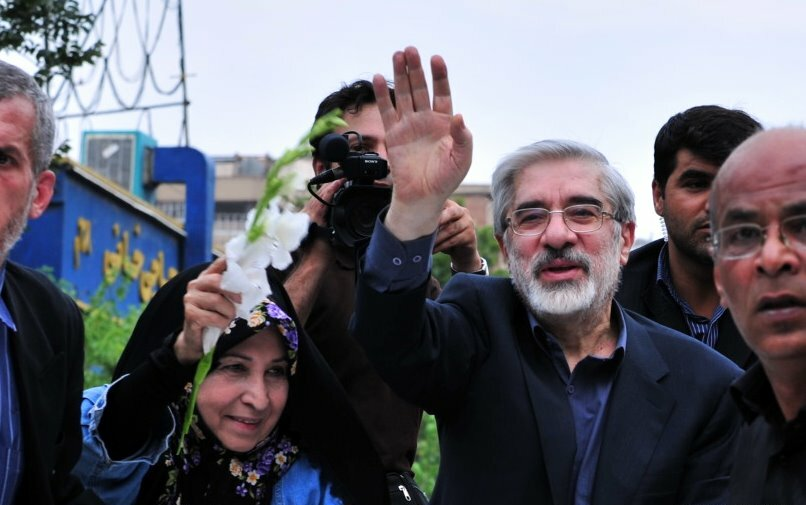
Presidential candidate Mir-Hossein Mousavi and his wife, Zahra Rahnavard in the protests of 15 June which recorded as the biggest unrest since the 1979 revolution

- Incumbent President Mahmoud Ahmadinejad, in a live address on state run television on 13 June, called the election "completely free" and the outcome "a great victory" for Iran. He also said, "[T]oday, the people of Iran have inspired other nations and disappointed their ill-wishers ... propaganda facilities outside Iran and sometimes inside Iran were totally mobilized against our people". Ahmadinejad praised the country's youth as well, but made no direct mention of the protests. He later dismissed the protests, comparing them to "the passions after a soccer match".
- Mir-Hossein Mousavi, the main opposition candidate, issued a statement saying, "I'm warning that I won't surrender to this manipulation." Mousavi lodged an official appeal against the result to the Guardian Council on 14 June. He is not optimistic about his appeal, saying that many of the group's members "during the election were not impartial".
- Reformist cleric Mehdi Karroubi, another opposition candidate, echoed Mousavi's demand for the election to be canceled. He said, "I am announcing again that the elections should not be allowed and the results have no legitimacy or social standing ... Therefore, I do not consider Mahmoud Ahmadinejad as president of the republic." He later declared in a speech to his supporters in Khoramabad that "this phase [Election dispute] will not subside until we [Reformist leaders] suggest so".
- Conservative candidate Mohsen Rezaee, on 17 June, gave an ultimatum to Interior Ministry to release details of the results by that day, otherwise he would call for re-election. He said that "unprecedented delay has raised doubts about the possibility of manipulation in the results." Later he withdrew the election fraud claims, saying that the Guardian Council is not cooperating with him.

=== Clerics ===
- The Association of Combatant Clerics, a reformist clerical party headed by Mohammad Khatami, issued a statement posted on reformist websites saying the election was rigged and calling for it to be canceled, warning that "if this process becomes the norm, the republican aspect of the regime will be damaged and people will lose confidence in the system".
- In a letter published on his website, Grand Ayatollah Hossein-Ali Montazeri stated that government used elections "[in] the worst way possible. Declaring results that no one in their right mind can believe, and despite all the evidence of crafted results, and to counter people protestations, in front of the eyes of the same nation who carried the weight of a revolution and 8 years of war, in front of the eyes of local and foreign reporters, attacked the children of the people with astonishing violence. And now they are attempting a purge, arresting intellectuals, political opponents and scientists".
- Several clerics in the religious center Qom were given house arrest and cut off from communication.
- The clerics Hashemi Rafsanjani and Hassan Rouhani tried to assemble an emergency meeting of the Assembly of Experts in Qom that could depose the Supreme Leader Ali Khamenei. However, official Iranian media reported that on 21 June the Assembly expressed "strong support" for the Supreme Leader. It remains unclear whether the statement has been signed by all experts and reflects their voice. However, Rafsanjani's son apparently reported to The New York Times that his father is currently hiding until he can get the top clerics together as he is indeed trying to depose Khamenei.
- Referring to the 2009 presidential election protests, supreme leader's representative Ahmad Khatami stated that the leaders of the protests should be dealt with "severely and ruthlessly". "I want the judiciary to... punish leading rioters firmly and without showing any mercy to teach everyone a lesson".
- Grand Ayatollah Yousef Sanei considers the election results fraudulent.
- Grand Ayatollah Javadi Amoli has criticized the government's conduction of the election.
- Grand Ayatollah Bayyat Zanjani called the election results a "gross injustice."
- Grand Ayatollah Abdolkarim Mousavi Ardebili called for the state to give protesters a legal voice.
- The Assembly of Qom Seminary Scholars and Researchers, described as "a leading clerical body in Qom, ... a mainstream group that includes many reformists in its ranks" issued a statement calling the vote count a fraud and condemning the killing of peaceful protesters.

=== Exiled groups ===
- Reza Pahlavi, son of the former Shah of Iran Mohammad Reza Pahlavi who was ousted in 1979, said: "I would love to help them [the protesters] reach complete, real freedom under a secular democratic system where there's a true separation of religion from government".
- People's Mojahedin Organization of Iran leader Maryam Rajavi said that "the Iranian nation's only possible solution to the velayat-e faqih regime is democratic changere. The religious dictatorship and all its suppressive institutions must be done away with so that the Iranian people can hold free UN-supervised elections".
- The Tudeh Party of Iran declared that "the Supreme Leader and the coup d'état perpetrators under his leadership must be defeated vigilantly and by relying on the power of the masses".

== Hunger strike ==
A number of Iranian intellectuals organized a three-day hunger strike in front of the United Nations. The invitation was signed by 42 scholars. The event was scheduled for 22–24 July 2009. Iranian journalist and writer, Akbar Ganji, spearheaded the strike to call for the release of all those who have been arrested in Iran following the protests.

Among the intellectuals that signed the invitation are: Abdolkarim Soroush, Hamid Dabashi, Mohsen Makhmalbaf, Abdol Ali Bazargan, and Janet Afary. Among the supporters of the initiative are Reza Baraheni and pop singers Ebrahim Hamedi, Googoosh, and Shohreh Aghdashlou. U.S. citizen Noam Chomsky was present at the hunger strike.

A number of Iranians organized a two-day strike at Brandenburger Tor in Berlin, Germany. The event was scheduled for 24–25 July 2009. The invitation had a list of over twenty people as strikers so far and a considerable list of supporters. Among the strikers was Daryush Shokof.

The number of cities joining the Iranian global hunger strike reached over fifty with Toronto, Vancouver, Washington DC, Los Angeles, Chicago, London, as well as Italy, Australia, and Ireland. The hunger strikes are for freedom of all Iranian political prisoners and for "not" recognizing the presidential elections and its president Mahmoud Ahmadinejad in 2009.

Robert Redford joined and supported the hunger strike in Washington on 20 July.

== International response ==
BBC News has described the overall reaction by the international community to the 2009 Iranian presidential election as "muted". Mir-Hossein Mousavi did not asked for any kind of foreign assistance or called on other leaders to comment. His spokesperson, Mohsen Makhmalbaf, has criticized U.S. President Barack Obama for maintaining that the difference between Ahmadinejad and Mousavi "may not be as great as has been advertised." Makhmalbaf retorted, "Does he like it himself [when someone is] saying that there is no difference between Obama and [George W.] Bush?" He also said that other nations must "not recognize the government of Ahmadinejad as a legitimate government" and that "it's not only an internal matter- it's an international problem".

However, in international popular culture, the protest has "morphed in the global consciousness, to the point that U2 and Madonna have adopted the cause of Iranian democracy," according to The New York Times Protesters have gathered in cities all over the world to protest the violence and election results. One of the largest protests was organized by United For Iran and held on 25 July 2009 in over 100 cities all over the world.

Although the 2009 Iranian presidential election was widely disputed, UN Secretary General Ban Ki-moon sent a traditional congratulatory message to Ahmadinejad upon his inauguration. He kept silent over the request of Shirin Ebadi to visit Iran after the crackdown on peaceful post-election protests by the Iranian police. During the election protests, more than 4,000 were arrested and nearly 70 were killed (with some sources, including Mohsen Kadivar, citing hundreds of killed), some while being held in prison. In another incident, prominent activisit Akbar Ganji went on a hunger strike for three days in front of the UN. The incident was followed by an official request by more than 200 intellectuals, human rights activists, and reformist politicians in Iran for a reaction from the UN. Ban, however, took no action to help end the violence in Iran.

About eight players in the Iran national football team playing in their World Cup qualifier wore green wristbands in support for Mousavi for the first half of their game. During the break, they were ordered to remove them, seven of the eight complied. They were subsequently suspended. Likewise, Italian footballer Francesco Totti sent a message of greeting to the Iranian youth during the protests.

A group of Iranian "artists and writers in exile" published an open letter in support of the protests. Significant protests have been held in major cities all throughout the world. Demonstrators in Los Angeles have protested daily calling not only for election reform but complete regime change. Demonstrators have been seen holding signs stating, "No Ahmadi(nejad), no Mousavi, no Islamic Republic!," "No more Islamic Republic."

== Use of religion ==
The Economist reported that supporters of Mousavi have enlisted religious symbolism on their side. This directly appeals to the notion of injustice and redemption at the heart of Shia Islam.

For Iran, one of the links of communication exist solely because of the ideology the revolutionary movement was based upon Islamism (Poursaied, p. 136). The religious institutions were used to communicate from one revolutionary group to another. These institutions consist of "mosques, ritual centres, and even charity funds," and these venues allowed people to gather right under the nose of the government in order to become organised.

Protesters have deliberately dressed modestly. The marches in Tehran saw women in chadors and turbaned clerics, some of whom were seen thronging Mousavi's car during the 15 June rally at Revolution Square. According to Anna Johnson of Associated Press, conservative women in black chadors have joined the liberal youth for the common goal of trying to get their voices heard. The Time reported that some protesters believed they had a religious duty to protest.

Protesters have also made use of slogans such as "Allahu Akbar" (a common Islamic Arabic saying that translates to "God is great") from the revolutionary era. Protesters on Twitter have urged marchers to carry copies of the Qur'an with them, citing its verses bringing about peace. When mourning the deaths of slain protesters, the marchers chanted "Peace be upon (Prophet) Mohammed and his family."

A bystander, Neda Agha-Soltan, who was killed by authorities, has been mythologised by the opposition as a martyr. The status of a martyr is revered in Shia Islam. To prevent this from happening, the authorities have tried to call off funeral services for her, which according to Shia Islam, must be held on the third, seventh, and 40th day after the martyr's passing. Robert Tait and Matthew Weaver of The Guardian noted that it was funeral processions on the 40th day of mourning of fallen protesters in 1979 that created momentum in toppling the shah's regime. The idea of martyrdom resonates deeply amongst the Shiite Muslim population of Iran. The Shiite faith was founded on the idea of self-sacrifice in the cause of justice.

== Legacy ==
According to the leader of the Islamic Revolutionary Guard Corps at the time of the protests—General Mohammed Ali Jafari—the problem of the election was not that the reformers had been denied victory but that they had challenged the tenets of the Islamic Revolution, and that the system of the Islamic Republic could no longer depend on popular support. In a leaked video of a meeting of the leaders of the Revolutionary Guard he stated, "It was a blow that weakened the fundamental pillars of the regime. ... Anyone who refuses to understand these new conditions will not be successful".

== Inspired art ==
- Ahoora released "Crimson Baby" as a single track from their third album Awkward Diary. This song is dedicated to Neda Agha-soltan and all the victims of Iran's 2009 post election conflicts.
- Hamed Nikpay and his team made the song "The Owner of This Land!" in response to Mahmoud Ahmadinejad's statement in which he called the protesters brushwood and thorns.
- Folk singer and activist Joan Baez performed in support of Iranian protesters.
- Jon Bon Jovi, Richie Sambora and Andy Madadian record a musical message of worldwide solidarity with the people of Iran. The handwritten Persian sign in the video translates to "we are one".
- Rock music band U2 performed "Sunday Bloody Sunday" in support of Iranian protests on the U2 360° Tour.
- Musicians Mohsen Namjoo, Abjeez Band, Googoosh, Dariush, Shadmehr Aghili, and Hassan Sattar also had performances in honor of the victims of the protests and to support the movement.
- Filmmaker Ali Samadi Ahadi released The Green Wave, a Documentary film about the protests and human rights violations in Iran in 2009.
- Iranian American artist Shaheen Shokoofandeh produced the film Hitler's Grave to show what the world of Iran could be without the daily hatred against the world outside its borders. He hopes that Iranian men and women would always see this movie as meaningful to their question of freedom and specifically when it comes to being Jewish or friends and having relationships with Jewish people.https://www.imdb.com/title/tt1524130/ The film is on YouTube.

== See also ==
- 2010 Thai political protests, Similar violence and riots and protests in Thailand, were organized by the National United Front for Democracy Against Dictatorship, (also known as the Red Shirts), opposed the People's Alliance for Democracy and supporters of Thaksin Shinawatra in Thailand
- 2009 Iran poll protests trial
- 2010 Canada anti-prorogation protests
- 2010 Kyrgyzstani revolution
- 2010–2011 Algerian protests
- 2011 Yemeni uprising
- 2017–18 Iranian protests
- Death and Funeral of Hussein-Ali Montazeri
- Kouhyar Goudarzi
- The Green Path of Hope – Mousavi's new political front
- The Green Scroll Campaign
- Political repression in the Islamic Republic of Iran
- Iranian reform movement
- List of modern conflicts in the Middle East
- Results of the Iranian presidential election, 2009
- Where is my vote?
- 2026 Iran protests

=== Arab Spring protests ===
- Arab Spring
- Egyptian Revolution of 2011
- Khuzestan protests
- Tunisian revolution
