= 2011–2012 Iranian protests =

Series of demonstrations in Iran

2011–2012 protests in Iran
- Part of the Iranian Green Movement and the Arab Spring
- Date: 14 February 2011 – 14 February 2012
- Location: Iran
- Caused by: Alleged electoral fraud during 2009 elections, violation of human rights, lack of freedom of speech, Corruption
- Goals: Solidarity with demonstrators in Egypt and Tunisia
- Methods: Civil disobedience, civil resistance, demonstrations, riots, strike actions, online activism
- Result: No government concessions made

Lead figures
Opposition leaders: Mir-Hossein Mousavi; Mehdi Karroubi; Mohammad Khatami; Zahra Rahnavard	Government leaders: Ali Khamenei; Mahmoud Ahmadinejad; Mohammad-Reza Rahimi; Mostafa Mohammad Najjar; Mohammad Ali Jafari

Casualties
- Deaths: Unknown

The 2011–2012 protests in Iran were a series of demonstrations in Iran which began on 14 February 2011, called "The Day of Rage". The protests followed the 2009–2010 Iranian election protests and were influenced by other concurrent protests in the region. Security forces quickly suppressed the demonstrations, resulting in two deaths and numerous injuries. Further protests followed, including on 20 February and 1 March, when the opposition reported around 200 arrests. Authorities subsequently managed to prevent large-scale demonstrations. The leaders of the Green Movement that had organized the protests, Mehdi Karroubi and Mir Hossein Mousavi, were placed under house arrest in early 2011 and have remained out of public view, with some government supporters demanding their execution.

== Background ==
Following the highly controversial 2009 Iranian presidential elections, massive protests erupted across Iran. The Iranian government suppressed the protests and stopped the mass demonstrations in 2009, with only very minor flare-ups in 2010. However, not many of the protesters' demands were met.

Then, the Arab Spring spread across the West Asia and North Africa. After the ousting of President Zine El Abidine Ben Ali in Tunisia on 14 January 2011, millions of people began demonstrating across the region in a broad movement aimed at various issues such as their standards of living or influencing significant reforms, with varying degrees of success. With the successful ousting of Egyptian President Hosni Mubarak on 11 February 2011 following that of President Ben Ali of Tunisia, renewed protests began in Iran.

== 2011 protests ==
On 27 January, the opposition group Green Movement of Iran announced a series of protests against the Iranian government scheduled to take place prior to the "Revolution Day" march on 11 February.

On 9 February, various opposition groups in Iran sent a letter to the Ministry of Interior requesting permission to protest under the control of the Iranian police. Permission was refused by the relevant government officials. Despite these setbacks and crackdowns on activists and members of opposition parties, opposition leaders such as Mir Hossein Mousavi and Mehdi Karroubi called for protests. According to the BBC, protesters argued that Ahmadinejad's 2009 re-election as president was rigged.

=== Timeline ===
==== 14 February ====
This date was chosen for protests to coincide with 25 Bahman, the 11th month of the Persian calendar, and was publicized as "The Day of Rage". The day before the protests were due to begin, opposition leaders Mousavi and Karroubi were placed under house arrest and denied access to telephones and the Internet. Their homes were blockaded and they were not allowed visitors. On 14 February 2011, thousands of protesters began to gather in a solidarity rally with Egypt and Tunisia. There was a large number of police on the streets to keep an eye on the protesters, but thousands were still able to gather together in Tehran's Azadi Square.

The solidarity protests turned into an anti-government demonstration during which the police fired tear gas and paintballs at protesters. To protect themselves, protesters responded by setting fires in garbage bins. Video footage showed a man being violently beaten by a group of protesters. Two protesters were killed in Tehran, both university students. Sane Jaleh during the protest, and Mohammad Mokhtari the next day from his wounds. According to reporter Farnaz Fassihi, Jaleh and Mokhtari were both shot by men on motorcycles who their friends identified as Basij members.

Protests were also reported in the cities of Isfahan and Shiraz, which police forcibly dispersed, as well as in Rasht, Mashhad, and Kermanshah.

The protests that occurred on this day marked a setback for the government of Iran, as the regime had campaigned that Mousavi's Green Movement had lost momentum, but the revived uprisings helps proved otherwise.

According to some reports, 1,500 Hezbollah fighters assisted in the suppression of the protests in Azadi Square. Following the initial protests, Hezbollah fighters allegedly continued to participate, assisting local forces in suppressing protests.

==== 15–16 February ====
Protests on 15 February were not as intense as the day before. On 16 February, there were sporadic clashes between protesters and pro-government forces. Karroubi and Mousavi responded to calls for their execution by saying they are willing to die in pursuit of a democratic change.

Thousands of pro-government supporters turned up in Tehran for several state sponsored rallies on 16 February.

==== 17–19 February ====
On 17 February, it was reported that opposition leader Mousavi had been missing since Tuesday, 15 February. Mousavi's daughters stated that they had had no contact with their father for over two days after security forces had put him under house arrest. His daughters feared that both Mousavi and their mother "had been detained". Mousavi's website stated that the "normal" guards that had been surrounding his home during his house arrest over the past week had been replaced with "masked security forces". Karroubi reported that one of his son's homes had been raided in an attempt to arrest his eldest son, but he was not in the building at the time.

On 18 February, Iran organized pro-regime rallies, with thousands of pro-government supporters calling for the execution of opposition leaders after Friday prayers. Ayatollah Ahmad Jannati said that the opposition leaders had lost their reputation and are as good as "dead and executed". He said there should be more restrictions on Mousavi and Karroubi. "Their communications with people should be completely cut. They should not be able to receive or send messages. Their phone lines and Internet should be cut. They should be prisoners in their homes."

On 19 February, the Interior Minister Mostafa Mohammad-Najjar stated that the protests set for Sunday, 20 February, will "be confronted as per the law".

==== 20 February ====
Protests were also planned for 20 February, to mark a week since the deaths of those killed in the 14 February protests.

The Fars News Agency released a report in the morning warning that "armed opposition groups plan to shoot at people in [the] protest rally set for Sunday afternoon." The government prohibited foreign media outlets based in Tehran from reporting on the protests, prompting the opposition to rely on social media as an alternative means of coverage. Protesters began gathering in the tens of thousands throughout Iran and especially in Tehran.

The protesters were seen occupying government buildings, such as the Islamic Republic of Iran Broadcasting building. However, extremely large numbers of police and plainclothes Basij militia were stationed throughout the city, even outnumbering the protesters in some of the city squares. Tear gas was fired and witnesses reported that security forces fired into protests and beat demonstrators with steel batons. In one neighborhood, Basij members reportedly took over a commercial building and dropped tear gas canisters from the roof onto protesters. Eyewitnesses reported that two protesters were killed by Basij paramilitaries, one each in the Vanak and Vali Asr squares. Police arrested a number of protesters and were seen stopping people on the streets and frisking them, along with removing people from vehicles.

The daughter of former Iranian President Akbar Hashemi Rafsanjani, Faezeh Hashemi, was arrested for taking part in a banned rally. Shortly afterward, she was reportedly released. The Fars News Agency reported that she had been released after claiming that she was out shopping.

There were also reports of other protester demonstrations going on in other major cities across Iran. However, coverage by journalists was thin because the Ministry of Intelligence and National Security had "sent a letter to foreign media offices in Tehran warning them that their bureaus would be shut down and their reporters deported if they wrote 'negative articles' surrounding the opposition protests." While the protests were taking place, the IRNA news agency released television reports saying that things were "completely quiet and normal." Furthermore, the Fars News Agency had released reports to the public saying that the 20 February protests would be especially violent, because the "opposition plans to shoot people".

It was later reported by witnesses that demonstrations did take place in Isfahan and Shiraz, most of which were dispersed after being attacked by police and Basij militia. Five protesters were reportedly injured in Shiraz.

==== 21 February ====
A statement released by the "Green Wave" movement in France said that the first secretary and vice consul at the consulate in Milan, Ahmed Maleki, a nephew to opposition leader Ayatollah Medhi Karroubi, had defected to the side of the opposition movement, and applied for political asylum in France where the rest of his immediate family were already residing.

==== 24 February ====
A statement was released by opposition websites and opposition leader Mousavi calling for "nationwide street protests every Tuesday for the next three weeks as a way to increase pressure on the government", which would have protests occurring on 1, 8, and 15 March. Dubbed the "Tuesdays of Protest", they were decided upon in order to keep the "momentum" of the protests going and to call for the protesters to move onto other types of resistance, such as "sit-ins, strikes, boycotts and civil resistance". The opposition has also stated that these new protests were called for in order to end the house arrests of the opposition leaders, Mousavi and Karroubi.

==== 25 February ====
A video depicting opposition leader Mehdi Karroubi was released early 25 February on the news website Sahamnews.org. It had been recorded by Karroubi before he had been placed under house arrest on 13 February. It called for the protesters to remain determined, saying, "We must remain determined on the road of our convictions, and I am certain we will succeed...We are committed to the pact we made with the people, to establish the power of the people and Islam based on elections. And on this road, no trouble, no difficulty is too hard to bear." The video itself was snuck out of his home by his wife in order to get it to the local media.

==== 26 February ====
It was reported that opposition leaders Mousavi and Karroubi, along with their wives, had been "placed in a safe house for their own welfare, but they have not been arrested", according to officials in the Iranian government. This was stated to be for their own protection, as the protesters were "looking for martyrs". The International Campaign for Human Rights in Iran expressed its concern for these changes, since a safe house is "considered a place for the secret detention of high security-value detainees, which is not under the control of the judiciary or any other monitoring mechanisms." They have been reportedly used in the past by the Iranian government as places where confessions are obtained from detainees through "methods and techniques".

==== 28 February ====
The statement that opposition leaders Mousavi and Karroubi had been moved to a safe house was put at odds with a statement released by a member of the Iranian judiciary, who stated that, "The two are currently in their homes and there have only been restrictions on their contacts."

==== 1 March ====
According to the families of opposition leaders Karroubi and Mousavi, and the website Kaleme (which is connected to the leaders), Karroubi and Mousavi and their wives have been arrested and are being held in Heshmatiyeh Prison. Officials of the Iranian government have denied it. An advisor to opposition leader Mousavi, Ardeshir Amir-Arjomand, said in response to this charge that Mousavi and Karroubi "have become hostages in the hands of the Iranian government. It is surprising that two prominent political figures have disappeared and no government official takes responsibility."

The opposition movement called for a protest for 1 March, which is the first in a series of protests dubbed the "Tuesdays of Protest". As in the other protests, security forces deploying tear gas and other weapons were out in significant numbers and clashed with protesters. According to opposition sources, over 200 protesters were arrested in Tehran by security services and plain clothes and another 40 in Isfahan. According to the BBC news, one of the arrested was Fakhrosadar Mohtashami, the wife of former minister Mostafa Tajzadeh, who (according to a relative or hers) is being kept in Evin Prison and "has not been allowed contact with her family for the time being."

According to RFERL, a "number of prominent Iranian activists" have appealed to United Nations Secretary-General Ban Ki-moon urging him "to use all 'international levers' at his disposal" to ensure the welfare of Musavi and Karrubi and "seek their release from detention". Amnesty International has issued a document of "Urgent Action" to their members asking them to write to Iranian authorities and appeal to them to "immediately disclose the whereabouts of Mir Hossein Mousavi, Mehdi Karroubi, Zahra Rahnavard and Fatemeh Karroubi."

The Iranian foreign ministry spokesman, Ramin Mehmanparast, stated that the situation with Mousavi and Karroubi was a "domestic issue" and that "the news related to some people [Karroubi and Mousavi] will be looked into by judiciary officials and within the legal frameworks. This issue cannot be used as a pretext by America and some other western countries ... to try to divert everyone's attention to unreal issues." Gholam-Hossein Mohseni-Eje'i, spokesperson for the Iranian judiciary. also released a statement saying, "The news released by some hostile media regarding the transfer of Mr Moussavi and Mr Karroubi to Heshmatieh detention centre is not correct."

==== 3 March ====
President Ahmadinejad blamed foreign powers for triggering unrest in Iran during a trip to Lorestan province.

==== 5 March ====
Opposition website Kaleme posted an announcement by the Green Coordination Council of the Green Path of Hope that called for a protest set for 8 March, which is International Women's Day. The protest is to be focused on "demanding more gender equality in the Islamic Republic and to protest the 'incarceration' of opposition leaders Mir Houssein Mousavi and Mehdi Karroubi and their wives."

Nobel Peace Prize laureate Shirin Ebadi also made a similar announcement, calling for support for an 8 March protest, saying, "On this day, shoulder to shoulder with our brothers, we will come to the streets to support the popular and broad democratic demands, because achieving 'equal rights' is possible only if voiced in a democratic system. But, we must not allow anyone to disregard our demands under the auspices of preventing crisis or avoiding divisiveness." She also commented on the change of dress for Iranian women that had become law at the beginning of the Iranian government, stating, "Thirty-two years ago on 8 March, International Women's Day, a statement broadcast on national television, stripped women employed by the government of one of their most basic rights – the freedom to choose their own dress...Iranian women are not starved for political power nor are they demanding decadence. They are simply weary of enduring more cruelty and disparagement. They are in search of justice and equality."

==== 6 March ====
The official website of opposition leader Karroubi released a statement saying that Ayatollah Ali Khamenei had been directly involved in the "abduction of Karroubi and his wife, Fatemeh", having given the orders to the soldiers under his command to do so. The statement also said that Vahid Haghanian, the administrative advisor to Khamenei, had personally led the "security forces which raided Karroubi's house in north Tehran and confiscated his belongings."

==== 8 March ====
Akbar Hashemi Rafsanjani, the former fourth Iranian president and prominent critic of the current Iranian government, was ousted as head of the Assembly of Experts, a body of clerics that chooses Iran's Supreme Leader. His departure from the Assembly came about after a lengthy period of opposition towards him among the conservatives of the Assembly after his support for the 2009 election protests. He had been running for reelection as head of the assembly, against Mahdavi Kani, but withdrew himself upon leaving the assembly. During his last speech at the Assembly, he stated, "I would like to devote my time to writing my memoirs and not run for any more public office."

Rafsanjani's resignation from the Assembly caused concern among the opposition protesters, as they had been hoping that he would "help influence Supreme Leader Ayatollah Ali Khamenei to moderate his support for Mr. Ahmadinejad". Analysts have stated that his resignation now allows the Assembly to choose a new supreme leader that will be more conservative than would otherwise have been possible.

A report was released by Tehran Bureau's staff reporter Hamid Farokhnia who has been covering events in Tehran. He stated that in preparation for the protests planned for International Women's Day on 8 March, various groups that have been leading the opposition, such as The Green Path of Hope, the Mourning Mothers and other groups, made announcements telling their followers to protest in multiple locations across Tehran. The purpose of this, according to Farokhnia, was to thin out the security presence at any one area, as this separation of protesters would require the Iranian police and the Basij to cover all possible places of protest in the city.

One of the methods that the Basij used to counteract this was to obtain more members, having new members "as young as 14" joining. Also, perhaps in order to show some sense of equality in light of International Women's Day, according to Farokhnia, the police also had groups of "female stormtroopers" working with the police and Basij, which he described as "fierce-looking chador-clad warriors".

Farokhnia went on to say that the Mourning Mothers told their followers to gather in protest at the usual place, "Laleh Park west of Vali Asr". In contrast, the Green Path of Hope assigned "four or five strategic locales in the city to its followers." This resulted in confusion for both the police forces and for the protesters, who eventually gave up on gathering in one of the places given and instead returned to the "old routine of walking quietly on the sidewalks of Enghelab Avenue." Because of the approach of the Persian New Year, Farokhnia stated, there was a high number of shoppers that ended up mingling with the protesters, creating confusion on which people were the protesters. Farokhnia explained the scenario as having "made for unnerving moments of tension but also rare instances of congeniality: protesters offering cookies to the special units of NAJA (the state police) and some young Basijis smiling approvingly at the brave protesters, proving for the umpteenth time that no matter how foul a political ideology, most Iranians in their hearts are revolted by violence and fanaticism."

==== 11 March ====
Jay Deshmukh, the Agence France-Presse deputy bureau chief in Tehran, was expelled from the country and "stripped of his press card along with 10 other correspondents". In response, Agence France-Presse "lodged an official protest with the Iranian authorities, in Tehran and Paris." The spokesman of the French foreign ministry, Bernard Valero, also released a statement saying: "This pitiful decision by the Iranian authorities reflects a new deterioration in the working conditions of journalists in Iran. We have expressed to the Iranian ambassador our concern and incomprehension at this new infringement of press freedom which will not be without consequences."

==== 13 March ====
The children of opposition leaders Mousavi and Karroubi released a statement through Mousavi's website Kaleme stating that on 8 March, they had been allowed to visit their parents. It was revealed that the two opposition leaders were being held in separate houses that were in the same neighborhood as Mousavi's home. Mousavi had told them that during an earlier raid on his home by police forces "various documents pertaining to the period of [his] years as prime minister, and a series of CDs containing years of work and research by Zahra Rahnavard were confiscated". Their children had been warned after their visit not to discuss it with anyone; but, after a few days of consideration, they decided to publish the information.

It was reported by Radio Farda in interviews with student activists in Iran that, since the start of the protests, "16–18 students of [Tehran] university have been detained." However, the students also noted that the number of student activists arrested could be much higher, as families of arrested student activists have been "warned against publicizing their plights".

==== 16 March ====
Sajjad Rezaie, the head of the Islamic Association of Tehran University's art faculty, had spoken out previously about Sanee Zhaleh, stating that he had been "a member of Mir Hossein Musavi's presidential campaign team in the June 2009 election." In response, Rezaie was "suspended from his teaching duties pending a ruling by the university's disciplinary committee."

==== 19 March ====
One of opposition leader Karroubi's sons, who had been arrested three weeks prior during the beginning of the protests, was "released on bail", but still "remains under unofficial house arrest".

Another of Karroubi's sons, Mohammad Taghi Karroubi, made an announcement in line with a previous statement from the daughters of opposition leader Mousavi, saying that he had been allowed to visit Karroubi, who is still under house arrest with his wife.

==== 20 March ====
Ebrahim Yazdi, leader of the Freedom Movement of Iran, was released from jail after having been arrested for being a prominent opposition leader during the 2009–2010 Iranian election protests. Upon his release, the Islamic Republic News Agency reported a "one-sentence statement from Yazdi saying he is resigning as leader of the Freedom Movement of Iran." The Freedom Movement organization itself is banned in Iran because it "opposes Iran's clerical rule and seeks democratic change." The center of Tehran was locked down after crowds of anti-regime demonstrators tried to gather there from across the city. The government denied the claim saying things were "peaceful" although the deputy police chief admitted that special forces had been deployed.

==== 22 March ====
Yasser Khomeini, a grandson of Ayatollah Ruhollah Khomeini, founder of the Islamic Republic of Iran, made a comment saying that the house arrest of opposition leaders Mousavi and Karroubi was an "unacceptable measure". This statement was made while he was "visiting Mehdi Karrubi's son, Ali, who was recently released from prison on bail." He also reportedly said he "hopes that with the beginning of the Persian new year on 21 March, 'the rule of law would be established' in Iran and 'people, political activists, and leading figures of the Iranian Revolution would be treated with wisdom and prudence.'"

==== 9 April ====
According to the Los Angeles Times, Mahmoud Ahmadinejad demoted his top advisor. It was also reported that his chief of staff was fired.

==== 15–18 April ====
According to the Saudi-owned pan-Arab news channel, Al Arabiya, there were protests by Iranian Arabs in the city of Ahvaz, capital of the Khuzestan province who were "demanding more rights and humanitarian benefits." Al Arabiya reports that when the protests began, the city was blockaded by Iranian security forces who "broke up demonstrations by force", and that "15 people from Ahwaz have been killed and dozens have been wounded."

Lebanon-based journalist Roula Hajjar wrote on the Los Angeles Times's blog that the protests on 15 April had also occurred in the cities Abadan, Khorramshahr, Mahshahr, and Shadegan. She noted that the events had "largely escaped international attention primarily due to the efforts of Iranian officials." She also stated that the state news agencies in Iran had reported the killing of at least three people, "including one officer" by "armed insurgents".

Human Rights Watch released a statement, saying that the Iranian government should allow international media into the area. Joe Stork, the Middle East director of HRW, stated, "Iran has made it impossible to confirm the scale of the deadly violence against protesters in Khuzestan province, making transparent and independent investigations into alleged killings and arrests there absolutely essential."

According to Radio Free Europe/Radio Liberty and The Guardian, Nobel Laureate Shirin Ebadi sent "a letter to UN human rights chief Navi Pillay in which she describes a deadly crackdown by Iranian security forces last week on a peaceful protest in Khuzestan's capital, Ahvaz." The letter stated that "at least 12 people were killed" in the protests, "20 injured", and "dozens were arrested". Human rights activists told RFE/RL they have received reports that "there were more than 150 arrests, including a number of intellectuals, artists, and women's rights activists" and that "the rest of the activists were told to not speak to any media organization."

==== 30 April – 7 May ====
It has been reported Iranian media has censored all coverage on protests in the rest of North Africa and the Middle East, especially in Syria, possibly in an attempt to prevent more protests. It has also been reported that Mahmoud Ahmadinejad has been "boycotting" his duties, with some analysts predicting that the country could soon go unstable. Tensions between Ahmadinejad and Ayatollah Ali Khamenei are said to have increased. Ahmadinejad, having sidelined many of its powerful opponents (Notably Akbar Hashemi Rafsanjani and Mohammed Khatami), recently tried to shortcut Khamenei powers, most notably by firing Heidar Moslehi, the intelligence minister, a conservative ally to Khamenei, without Khamenei's agreement. Moslehi was later restored by Khamenei, while several close allies of the president, including Ahmadinejad's progressive chief of staff Esfandiar Rahim Mashaei, have been arrested and accused of invoking djinns.

==== 4 August ====
The fraudulent digital certificate for *.google.com issued by DigiNotar is deployed in a large-scale man-in-the-middle attack against the subjects of Iran.

==== 27–29 August ====
Man-in-the-middle attack detected first by Iranian subject, then in the Mozilla forums. On 29 August, the fraudulent digital certificate for *.google.com is finally revoked, but it takes weeks for all browser vendors to create and distribute a blacklist.

==== 11 September ====
Reports that two more Gonabadi Dervishes have been arrested in Kovar in southeastern Iran.

== 2012 protests ==
=== 7 February ===
The children of Mir Hossein Mousavi and Mehdi Karoubi called for silent protests in Iran on 14 February, to mark the one year anniversary since their fathers were placed under house arrest.

=== 10 February ===
The Coordination Council of the Green Path of Hope, as one of the leading organizers of opposition protests in Iran, called for the Iranian people to "express their protest of the country's autocratic rulers, but also any form of foreign intervention in Iran such as international sanctions and war". The Council went on to state that the Iranian government was a representation of neither Islam or a Republic.

=== 11 February ===
Morteza Tamaddon, the governor of the Tehran Province, said in a meeting with the Young Journalists' Club that he and his security forces were "prepared to quell dissenters on Tuesday". He also stated that the protests in general were a "propaganda pose" in order to lessen attendance at the 11 February 1979 Revolution anniversary rally and the 2 March parliamentary election rally.

=== 13 February ===
Chants of "Allah is Great" and "Death to the Dictator" were heard throughout many major Iranian cities.

=== 14 February ===
Isolated protests were reported throughout Tehran, with a large number of security forces and police evident on the streets. In the week leading up to the protest, Internet access in Tehran had slowed and a "serious disruption in mobile services" was reported on the protest day.

== Arrests ==
Ignacio Pérez-Cambra, the Consul of Spain in Iran, was arrested for a period of four hours during the early part of the day on 14 February. He was accused by Iranian police of going to one of the demonstrations. Spain later demanded an explanation or apology from the Iranian government about the arrest of Pérez-Cambra that included a "satisfactory response", threatening to call him home from Iran if one was not received. The foreign ministry already announced that it had "suspended an upcoming visit to Madrid by a senior Iranian diplomat." The UK also echoed its displeasure over the detainment of Cambra. Iran's Minister of Foreign Affairs, Ali Akbar Salehi, called the Spanish Foreign Affairs Minister, Trinidad Jiménez, on 17 February in order to apologize for the incident with Cambra, stating that those responsible for his arrest had been "unaware that they were violating the Vienna Convention", but that an investigation was underway nonetheless.

Ghaneh Jaleh, the brother of one of the students who were killed, was arrested on 17 February, reportedly because he gave "a telephone interview to foreign media about his brother", specifically to Voice of America. During the interview, he told Voice of America that his brother, Saleh Jaleh, was not a member of the Basij, as was being claimed, but that the Basij membership card had been faked by the government. He explained that, on 15 February, his cousin had taken a photo of Saleh from his home and it was this image of Saleh that was on the Basij membership card.

Faezeh Hashemi, the daughter of former Iranian president Akbar Hashemi Rafsanjani, was arrested on 20 February while attending one of the anti-government protests on that day. The reasons stated for her arrest included "making blunt statements" and "chanting provocative slogans". She was released from police custody shortly afterwards.

Ali Karroubi, the son of opposition leader Mehdi Karroubi, and his wife were arrested on 21 February according to opposition websites, with Ali's wife later being released while Ali himself is still being kept in custody.

On the Tuesday protest of 1 March, Fakhrosadar Mohtashami, wife of former minister Mostafa Tajzadeh, was arrested and taken to Evin Prison.

The official number of protesters arrested has been given as 150 by the government, but the opposition claims that the numbers are far higher, at around 1,500. Since the initial protests, the number of officially recognized arrests has risen to 1,500, with the opposition also raising their believed number of arrested protesters.

It was reported that at least 16–18 student activists at Tehran University have been arrested since the beginning of the protests. One student, Arzhang Alipour, had "given interviews to media describing how fellow student Hamed Nour-Mohammadi was killed during protests in the southwestern city of Shiraz on 20 February," which resulted him being called in front of the disciplinary committee of the university three times before he was finally arrested on 12 March.

== Casualties ==
The human rights organisation HRANA's website reported that one person had died after riot police opened fire at protesters near Tohid Square in Tehran. According to Kazem Jalali, one of the injured protesters also died later in the day on 14 February.

Both people killed (Mohammad Mokhtari and Sanee Zhaleh) were students, though from different universities. According to the Iranian government, Sanee Zhaleh was a member of the Basij militia and was killed by the opposition. Reuters reported that protesters did not deny that Zhaleh was a Basij member, but that he had "attended Monday's rally as an active opposition supporter." But other protesters have strongly denied Zhaleh's Basij involvement and produced an image of Zhaleh visiting Grand Ayatollah Hossein Ali Montazeri – one of the main critics of Ayatollah Khamenei and Mahmoud Ahmadinejad – indicating Zhaleh was truly with the opposition. International Campaign for Human Rights in Iran (ICHRI) and Tehran Bureau both quote student oppositionists who deny Jaleh was a Basiji. A member of the Tahkim-e Vahdat student organisation (Office for Strengthening Unity) told the ICHRI that Jaleh was "not a Basiji", but a member of the Tehran Arts University's Islamic Association, and that "he had attended previous demonstrations as well." Sanee's brother, Ghaneh Jaleh, also denied Saleh's membership in the Basij. He and others assert that Jaleh's Basij membership card was faked from a photo taken from Ghaneh's house.

Clashes erupted during the funeral service held for Zhaleh. Voice of America reported that government loyalists arrived at the funeral and began fighting with the protesters, forcing them to leave and abandon the funeral service. The Guardian also reported that Iranian authorities had "hijacked the funeral of Zhaleh, busing in hundreds of pro-government supporters and banning his own family from attending." The IRIB news service reported that the mourners at the funeral were government supporters and could be heard chanting slogans such as "death to Mousavi" and "death to Karroubi". IRIB also reported that the funeral procession was then attacked by members of "the sedition movement", who were repelled by pro-government protesters.

Two unidentified men were killed by the Basij militia during the 20 February protests, each respectively in the Vanak and Vali Asr squares.

It was later reported that another student, Hamed Nour-Mohammadi, was killed by security forces during the protests in Shiraz. The Iranian state media later quoted the president of the student's university as saying that "Nour-Mohammadi died in a car accident and that he hadn't taken part in the antigovernment rallies that day." Since Mohammadi's death, student protesters have not been allowed into the university grounds and his family warned "to remain silent on the subject of Nour-Mohammadi's death."

Al Arabiyia citing an anonymous source, claimed that 15 people had been killed in Ahvaz (Khuzestan province), following protests by the Arab minority there.

== Domestic responses ==
Iranian President Mahmoud Ahmadinejad released a statement saying, "It is clear the Iranian nation has enemies because it is a nation that wants to shine, conquer peaks and change [its international] relations...Of course, there is a lot of hostility against the government. But they knew that they would get nowhere.... [the organizers of the protests] just wanted to tarnish the Iranian nation's brilliance...It is a shining sun. They threw some dust towards the sun... but the dust will return to their eyes."

The commander of the Basij Mohammad Reza Naghdi told the Fars News Agency that he believed the protests had been started by "western spies" and that "western intelligence agencies are searching for a mentally challenged person who can set himself on fire in Tehran to trigger developments like those in Egypt and Tunisia."

The Mourning Mothers gave their support to the protests and stated that they would be joining the protesters in their marches. They called for the unconditional release of all political prisoners, abolition of the death penalty, and a public trial for all those who had permitted massacres of citizens in the past 35 years.

=== Calls for executions ===
On 15 February, Press TV reported that members of the Iranian parliament had called for the execution of two opposition leaders for inciting demonstrations on the previous day. 221 of the MPs present at the Iranian parliament signed a statement that said "Mehdi Karroubi and Mir Hossein Mousavi are corrupts (sic) on earth and should be tried. We believe the people have lost their patience and demand capital punishment." After signing the statement, the signatories gathered in the center of the chamber chanting "Death to Mousavi, death to Karroubi." The term "corrupts on earth" is a specific Iranian charge also known as Mofsed-e-filarz that carries the death penalty.

Mousavi said that "the demonstrations [are] a 'great achievement'" and Karroubi responded directly to the MPs claiming that he "is willing to 'pay any price' for his country."

Gholam-Hossein Mohseni-Eje'i, Prosecutor General of Iran, voiced his support for the actions of parliament and that he thought the opposition leaders should be "punished".

Pro-government clerics began calling for the execution of former president Akbar Hashemi Rafsanjani on 16 February as he had become increasingly aligned with the Green Movement since the 2009 election protests.

=== Clerics call for "anger" rally ===
The Islamic Propagation Coordination Council called for a rally on 18 February 2011 in order to show anger at what it called the "crimes" of "seditionist" leaders and their rebel allies. As a result, before and after Friday prayer, thousands of pro-government demonstrators poured into the streets of major cities to demonstrate their support and demand prosecution of Mousavi, Karroubi, and Khatami.

=== Censorship ===
All forms of Iranian media were banned from covering the protests, though the demonstrators were still able to release information by utilising social media like Facebook and Twitter. In addition, foreign media were banned from covering the events. After 10 February, the keyword "Bahman", which was the current month in the Persian calendar, was also a blocked keyword for messages on mobile phones. This resulted in slower Internet connection speeds in some cities of Iran.

On 16 March 2011, Comodo, a major American certificate authority, advised Microsoft that nine fraudulent SSL certificates had been issued by one of its affiliates in Southern Europe. The domains affected were:

- login.live.com
- mail.google.com
- www.google.com
- login.yahoo.com (3 certificates)
- login.skype.com
- addons.mozilla.org
- "Global Trustee"

Microsoft subsequently released an emergency update to revoke the fraudulent certificates that could have led to spoofing attacks. Similarly, Mozilla also blacklisted the fraudulent certificates. According to Comodo, both attacks originated from IP addresses assigned to Internet service providers in Iran and may have originated from government agencies interested in monitoring dissident activity.

==== 2012 ====
In the days leading up to the 14 February 2012 protests, Internet access to specific sites, such as Facebook, Twitter, and "other foreign sites", along with email access, was blocked throughout Iran, affecting more than 30 million people. The sites were replaced with a message reading, "According to computer crime regulations, access to this Web site is denied." As reported by The Washington Post, a number of Iranian bloggers feared that this outage was a precursor to the implementation of the "National Internet", also known as the "Halal Internet", which would allow the Iranian government to "block 'damaging' Western Web sites".

On 13 February, it was reported that email access had returned, though the other sites remained blocked.

=== Use of child soldiers ===
The Guardian reported that after the 1 March protest onwards, children from ages 12–16 began being used by the Basij against the protesters. According to information released by the International Campaign for Human Rights in Iran, these children were "armed with batons, clubs and air guns and ordered to attack demonstrators who have tried to gather in Tehran." They had been bussed in by the government from rural provinces far from the capital. People in the area stated that the children had been paid and were also promised chelow kabab dinners.

The executive director of the International Campaign for Human Rights in Iran, Hadi Ghaemi, stated that "it's really a violation of international law. It's no different than child soldiers, which is the custom in many zones of conflict. They are being recruited into being part of the conflict and armed for it." He also commented that "they are very keen to display violence. Teenage boys are notorious for that. They are being used to ensure there is a good ratio of government forces to protesters and because the average policeman in Tehran could have some kind of family connection to the people they have to beat up. It's a classic tactic to bring people from outside, because they have no sense of sympathy for city dwellers."

== International reactions ==
Supranational bodies

- European Union At the meeting in Brussels of the 27 members of the European Union on 21 February, seven of the EU countries "called for sanctions to be adopted when the ministers gather again next month" against Iran for their human rights violations. This was in response to the government's actions in terms of the protesters and because of the execution of "Zahra Bahrami, an Iranian-Dutch national sentenced for drug trafficking", on 4 February.

Catherine Ashton, the High Representative of the Union for Foreign Affairs and Security Policy for the EU, made a statement in regards to Iran's reasoning that house arrest is "necessary for the opposition leaders' own protection." She said in her statement, "This justification remains unconvincing and does not explain why they have not been allowed normal communications." She also went on to say that if they were released, this would "dispel the impression that the continued restrictions under which they are held constitute a means of deliberate suppression of political opposition in Iran."

- United Nations – Secretary-General Ban Ki-moon stated in a council meeting that the arrest of opposition leaders Mousavi and Karroubi "violated the Iranian Constitution and civil law as well as the international provisions of human rights."
  - The United Nations Human Rights Council had a vote on 24 March that appointed a "Special Rapporteur on the situation of human rights in Iran", who will "independently investigate and report on abuses in Iran, and make recommendations on how they can be addressed."

States

- Canada – Foreign Minister Lawrence Cannon released a statement saying that "Canada is deeply concerned by the violence perpetrated by Iranian authorities against peaceful protestors in Tehran. The hypocrisy of Iranian authorities' calls for democracy in Egypt and suppression of the same demands in Iran is deeply disturbing."
- Germany – Guido Westerwelle, the German Minister for Foreign Affairs, spoke with Germany's diplomat from Iran to "protest the removal of [Mousavi and Karroubi], and called on Tehran to allow the pair access to lawyers." He also spoke with Germany's diplomat in Iran, urging him to "guarantee the safety" of the opposition leaders.

Steffen Seibert, a spokesman for the German government, said that "the removal of the men was an 'intimidation tactic' that violates international human rights laws."

- Israel – Prime Minister Benjamin Netanyahu called upon the West to act against Iran: "If the international community is applying special pressure on Libya and warning its leader and soldiers against violating civil rights, the same warning must be aimed at Iran's leaders and their henchmen... At the same time as Kadhafi is massacring his opponents in Libya, the regime of the ayatollahs in Iran is systematically executing its opponents...I believe that a firm reaction will send a very clear message of encouragement and hope to the Iranian people, that no one has forgotten their struggle for freedom and liberty."
- Sweden – Frank Belfrage, the State Secretary for Foreign Affairs, summoned and spoke with the Iranian ambassador, Rasoul Eslami, on 3 March to discuss the arrest of opposition leaders Mousavi and Karroubi. State Secretary Belfrage said that "the ambassador's explanation of the circumstances was 'unsatisfactory' and that Sweden will keep a close eye on the development of the case."
- United Kingdom – William Hague, the Foreign Secretary for the U.K., commented, "I have seen reports today of peaceful demonstrators being assaulted by Iranian security forces. President Ahmadinejad last Friday told the Egyptian people that they had the right to express their own views about their country. I call on the Iranian authorities to allow their own people the same right and to ensure that the security authorities exercise restraint."
  - Tony Blair, former British Prime Minister, stated, "I think it's very important that we stand up now for those people who want to protest for freedom and proper democratic elections in Iran." He added, "I think [a change in Iran's government] would be possibly the single most dramatic change in the whole of the region because you would then have Iran playing a constructive part. You would have Iran not trying to destabilize other countries in the region, and arming militia-type groups."
- United States – During a press conference, President Barack Obama spoke out about Iran and its protesters saying: "My hope and expectation is that we're going to continue to see the people of Iran have the courage to be able to express their yearning for greater freedoms and a more representative government, understanding that America cannot ultimately dictate what happens inside of Iran any more than it could inside of Egypt." Hillary Clinton, Secretary of State for the United States, said that the White House "very clearly and directly support[s] the aspirations [of the protesters]". She also noted the hypocrisy of the Iranian government for supporting the protests and revolution in Egypt, but not allowing peaceful protests within Iran. She added, "We think that there needs to be a commitment to open up the political system in Iran to hear the voices of the opposition and civil society." In an advance response, the US State Department set up a Persian language Twitter feed the day before in order to allow easier communication by Iran's Internet users with the outside world. The Department's first tweet on the feed announced, "US State Dept recognizes historic role of social media among Iranians. We want to join in your conversations." The United States Treasury Department released a statement placing sanctions on Abbas Jafari Dolatabadi, the Tehran prosecutor general, and Mohammad Reza Naqdi, the commander of the Iran Revolutionary Guard Corps' Basij Forces. Both men had been put on the Office of Foreign Assets Control blacklist, which "bans any U.S. persons from transactions with them and seeks to freeze any assets they may have under U.S. jurisdiction. It also subjects them to State Department visa sanctions." This was in response to the human rights violations they had conducted during the 2009–2010 Iranian election protests. Reuters described the timing of the release of the statement as a "show of solidarity with victims of torture, persecution and arbitrary detention" in relation to the current protests in Iran and the rest of the Middle East and Northern Africa. During his annual address to the Iranian people on the Persian New Year, President Barack Obama cited the violent oppression of past events, saying, "But the future of Iran will not be shaped by fear. The future of Iran belongs to the young people – the youth who will determine their own destiny." He also referenced the 1979 Iranian Revolution, stating, "You are not bound by the chains of the past – the distracting hatred of America that will create no jobs or opportunity; the rigid and unaccountable government; the refusal to let the Iranian people realize their full potential for fear of undermining the authority of the state. Instead, you – the young people of Iran – carry within you both the ancient greatness of Persian civilization, and the power to forge a country that is responsive to your aspirations. And though times may seem dark. I want you to know that I am with you."

United States Representative Ileana Ros-Lehtinen commented that "The regime's oppression of the Iranian people has only grown since the rigged elections and suppressed demonstrations of 2009. The US made a mistake then by not voicing full and vigorous support for Iranians demanding freedom and democracy. We cannot make that mistake again."

Non-governmental organisations

The police crackdown on protesters led Amnesty International to denounce Iranian authorities. They released a statement saying, "Iranians have a right to gather to peacefully express their support for the people of Egypt and Tunisia." The reaction of the Iranian authorities towards the protests was strongly criticised by Amnesty International, according to Reuters.

Marvin Feuer, the director of policy and government affairs for the American Israel Public Affairs Committee, stated in a seminar with the Reserve Officers Association that "despite turmoil in the region it is critical not to lose focus on Iran." He also commented on the American government's problems with supporting democracy in the area while still keeping American security interests stable: "The Iranian case does not pose the same problem. In Iran, all of these concerns align. Iran is a bad player in any realm we can think of."

Academia

Reza Aslan, an Iranian-American activist and writer of No god but God stated in an interview with Neon Tommy that "the [Iranian] regime is unsustainable", referring to its current governmental system and how it responds to both internal and external forces such as the current protest movement. He commented to The Washington Post that "pressure is going to continue to build on Iran. Iran sees itself as an exemplar for the region for having thrown off an American-backed dictatorship. But it really only replaced one tyrant with another."

Financial markets

The violence from the street protests caused fear in the global stock market that oil supplies would be interrupted from Iran, which is one of the world's leading exporters of oil. These fears caused the price of WTI crude oil to rise above $85 a barrel.

== See also ==
- Iranian reform movement
- Iranian revolution
- Iran student protests, July 1999
- 2009 Iranian election protests
- 2017 Iranian protests
- 2009 Iran poll protests trial
- Where is my vote?
- Kahrizak detention center
- The Green Scroll Campaign
- The Green Path of Hope
- List of modern conflicts in the Middle East
- Freedom in the World
- List of freedom indices
