= Ahoora =

Ahoora may refer to:

- Ahoora (band), an Iranian rock band
- Ahoora (album), a 2006 studio album by Ahoora
- Ahoora Behbahan FSC, an Iranian professional futsal club
