= All in Blood with You =

Studio album by Ahoora
- Released: September 30, 2007
- Recorded: April/June 2007 at Digital Circus, Tehran
- Genres: Thrash metal, heavy metal, power metal
- Length: 40:25
- Label: Ahoora
- Producer: Ahoora

Ahoora chronology
Ahoora (2006)	All in Blood with You (2007)	Awkward Diary (2010)

All in Blood with You is the second album by the Iranian heavy metal band Ahoora, released originally inside Iran on September 30, 2007. The album was re-mastered and available for free download in 2010.

== Reception ==
Sound on Sound wrote: “the band's technical ability puts to shame many of the demos I've heard from more liberal regimes. They play with an assured power and precision” Metal Mayhem called it “…already one of the favorites of the year” while Ultimate Metal called it “an incredible release that everyone should check out”

== Track listing ==
No.	Title	Length
1.	"Heart of Darkness"	4:00
2.	"Out of Mind Walls"	6:47
3.	"A History of Extinction"	6:17
4.	"Between Maybe & Never"	4:36
5.	"The Departed"	4:42
6.	"The Journeyman"	2:02
7.	"Hunger Within"	8:12

== Personnel ==
- Milad Tangshir – rhythm guitars, backing vocals
- Ashkan Hadavand – lead vocals
- Mamy Baei – bass
- Alireza Saeidian – lead guitar
- Ida Norheim-Hagtun - Female vocals on track 7
- Produced by Ahoora
- Engineered, mixed and mastered by Mamy Baei
- Recorded at Digital Circus, Tehran. April/June 2007
- Artwork: Alireza Saeidan
