= Awkward Diary =

Studio album by Ahoora
- Released: 2 March 2010
- Genres: Progressive rock, electronic rock, post-rock
- Label: Zirzamin
- Producer: Ahoora

Ahoora chronology
All in Blood with You (2007)	Awkward Diary (2010)

Awkward Diary is the third album by the Iranian rock band Ahoora, released by Zirzamin on 2 March 2010.

== Reception ==
Some critics were disappointed by the new electronic progressive post-rock approach rather than progressive metal of the previous albums. Metal Invader called it progressive trip hop while Insomniac Magazine wrote: “As a band, Ahoora frequently shifts gears between Heavy Metal, Groove Metal, Hard Rock, Alternative and Jazz melodic meanderings mixed in with synths and other varied instruments”. Classic Rock Magazine believed: “This shows some very nice touches. Imagine Muse and Tool getting all cozy around Iced Earth and you’ve got the drift here. The musicianship is accomplished, the songs concise and focused”.

== Track listing ==
No.	Title	Length
1.	"Masks & Balefires"	3:33
2.	"Unattended"	2:23
3.	"Nervous Ghost"	3:24
4.	"Alien"	3:32
5.	"Closure"	3:04
6.	"Drizzle Knight"	4:49
7.	"Crimson Baby"	3:24
8.	"Perfect Day"	3:14
9.	"Ellipsis-Diagnosis"	3:44
10.	"Free As a Man"	2:57
11.	"Out of the Past"	3:06
12.	"Egoless"	4:14

== Personnel ==
- Milad Tangshir – guitars, backing vocals
- Ashkan Hadavand – lead vocals
- Mamy Baei – bass
- Farzad Golpayegani – guitar solo on tracks 4 & 11
- Darren Motamedy – Saxophone on track 11
- Parviz Norouzi – Saxophone on tracks 4 & 5
- Produced by Ahoora
- Recorded & Mixed by Mamy Baei
- Mastered by Farzad Golpayegani
- Front cover by Richard Baxter
- Back cover by Mattijn Franssen
