= The Green Scroll Campaign =

Petition regarding 2009 Iranian election

The Green Scroll of Freedom (Persian: تومار اعتراضی جنبش سبز) is the world's longest petition scroll, measuring over 2,000 metres in length. Its creation was driven by members of the Iranian diaspora, and it is covered by signatures from people around the world, questioning the legitimacy of Mahmoud Ahmadinejad as the Iranian president after the disputed Iranian presidential election in June 2009, condemning the human rights abuses committed against Iranian protesters, and standing in solidarity to demand universal human rights, justice, and freedom for the Iranian people. The primary goal of the Green Scroll campaign is to reassure Iranians inside Iran that they are not alone in their struggle.

== Origin ==
Ali Tehrani, a 44-year-old Iranian residing in Waterloo, Ontario (Canada) came up with the idea for the Green Scroll campaign in late June 2009 while watching the Iranian government unleash abuses against people in his home country. Tehrani's original concept was to hang the finished Scroll from the CN Tower in Toronto, Ontario, Canada or the Eiffel Tower in Paris, France, as an act of worldwide protest against Ahmadinejad's pending inauguration for a second term as Iran's president.

The idea spread rapidly amongst members of the Iranian Diaspora. In cities around the world, Iranian activists purchased rolls of green cloth from local sources, and quickly collected thousands of signatures from Iranians and non-Iranians alike between July 10 and 12. Eventually, over 190 cities worldwide sent rolls of cloth to Paris, France, where they were sewn together into one continuous banner. When all the pieces were assembled, and The Green Scroll of Freedom was made with the signatures collected stretching for over 2,000 metres in length.

== Purpose ==
The purpose of the Green Scroll of Freedom campaign are as follows:

1. To tell the world Ahmadinejad is not Iran’s legitimate president

2. To condemn the human rights abuses, rapes, torture, killings, and other injustices that have been unleashed against peaceful Iranians

3. To demand universal human rights, freedom, and equitable justice for the Iranian people

4. To encourage foreign governments not to recognise Ahmadinejad's “Coup d'etat” government

5. To show unity between all Iranians outside of Iran

6. To demonstrate to Iranians inside of Iran that they are supported by people around the world, and assure them that they are not alone in their struggle

7. To generate ongoing media attention about the struggle of the Iranian people

== Display history ==
=== Paris ===
The Green Scroll of Freedom made its public debut on July 25, 2009, in Paris, France in the shadow of the Eiffel Tower, encircling a large portion of the Champ de Mars. This coincided with (but was not planned as an official part of) a global day of action on July 25 in over 100 cities worldwide by a coalition of Green Iranian activists.

=== New York ===
In response to Mahmoud Ahmadinejad's appearance at the United Nations General Assembly meeting in New York City on September 23, 2009, the Green Scroll was shipped to New York, where on September 24, 2009, it was marched across the Brooklyn Bridge.

New York Police Department officials were afraid that if the Scroll was marched across as one continuous banner, in the event part of scroll was blown by winds onto the Brooklyn Bridge roadway, the 2,000 metre-long Scroll would pose a serious safety hazard for both cars on the road and people on the walkway. For this safety reason, the NYPD required that the Scroll be cut up into fifty (50) foot sections, and carried across the Brooklyn Bridge on cardboard poles. Most of the sections were numbered as they were cut, so that the Scroll could be re-assembled in the original order later.

=== Washington, D.C. ===
On November 15, 2009 (also World Students Day), the Green scroll was marched across the national mall, starting at the base of the Washington monument and finishing at the steps of the U.S. Capitol building.

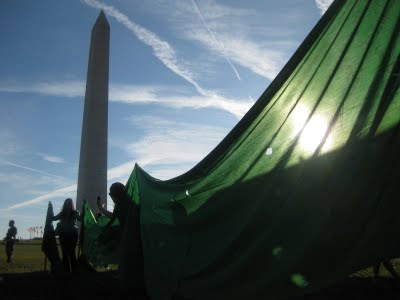
The green scroll at the Washington monument

== International reactions ==
In the United Arab Emirates, police blocked Iranian protesters from signing the Green Scroll, the Dubai-based National newspaper reported. The police told the crowd that "they were forbidden from sending official petitions from United Arab Emirates soil, as Iran and the UAE have diplomatic ties".

== See also ==
- One Million Signatures
