= Ahoora (album) =

Studio album by Ahoora
- Released: February 13, 2006
- Genre: Heavy metal, thrash metal, power metal
- Length: 53:06

Ahoora chronology
Ahoora (2006)	All in Blood with You (2007)

Ahoora is the debut album by the Iranian heavy metal band Ahoora, released illegally inside Iran on February 13, 2006. The album was later re-released by Real2Can, appearing on iTunes in 2007 and on Amazon by 2008.

== Reception ==
Chronicles of Chaos wrote "Ahoora have clearly spent a lot of time honing their sound, both individually and as a unit, resulting in a coherent and tight album.”

== Track listing ==
No.	Title	Length
1.	"Spiritual Creator"	6:05
2.	"Beyond the Reasonable Doubt of a Lunatic"	11:45
3.	"Flock"	7:58
4.	"The Child of Volcano"	9:43
5.	"Tale of Crimson Path"	7:42
6.	"Ahoora"	9:53

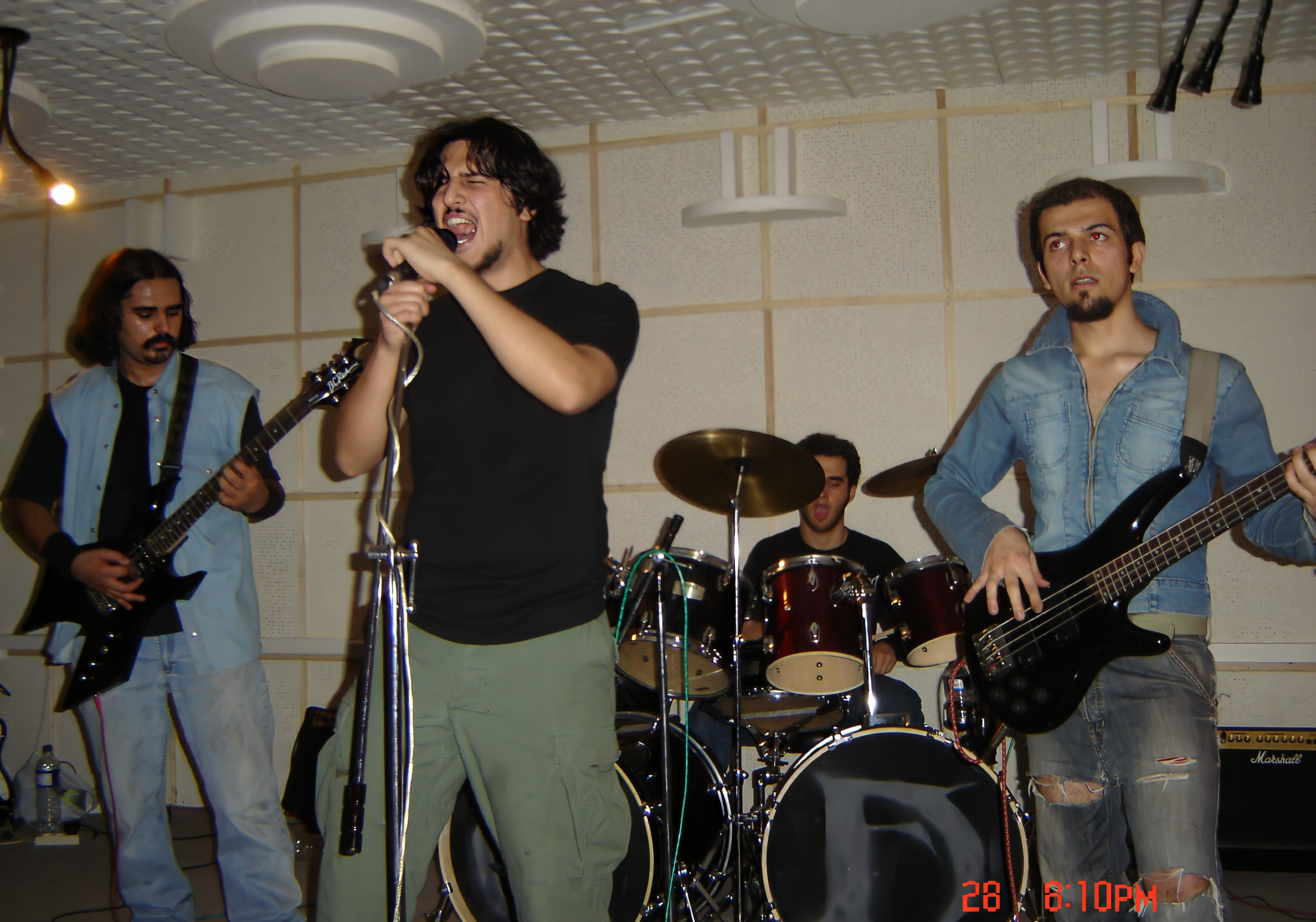
From left to right: Tangshir, Hadavand, Masoomi, Baei.

== Personnel ==
- Milad Tangshir – guitars, backing vocals
- Ashkan Hadavand – lead vocals
- Mamy Baei – bass

Produced by Ahoora
