= The Green Path of Hope =

Iranian reformist organisation

Green Path of Hope راه سبز امید
- Spokesperson: Ardeshir Amir Arjomand
- Founder: Mir-Hossein Mousavi
- Founded: 15 August 2009; 17 years ago
- Legalised: Banned
- Ideology: Third Way; Planned economy; Socialism
- National affiliation: Reform Movement; Green Movement
- Colors: Green

Website
- rahesabz.net kaleme.org sahamnews.org tahavolesabz.com irangreenvoice.com tagheer.cc

The Green Path of Hope (Persian: راه سبز امید, romanized: Rāh-e Sabz-e Omid) is an Iranian association established by Iranian presidential campaign candidate, Mir-Hossein Mousavi. It was founded on 15 August 2009 as the organizational body of the Green Movement. Mousavi described it as the "countless self-initiated and independent social networks" which form the body of Green Movement. It has also been mentioned as a "political front" in some media.

== Name ==
According to Mousavi's advisor, Ali Reza Beheshti, Mousavi himself chose the name. He chose the word "Path" to avoid terminology such as "party" or "movement". He also chose the word "green" because of the green color symbol used by protesters, and the word "hope" based on a promise to establish a government of "hope" if elected.

== Goals ==
The Green Path of Hope seeks to continue protests against the legitimacy of Ahmadinejad's presidency following lawful and peaceful ways, and the full execution of the constitution, as Mousavi says:

You can't follow some parts of the constitution and throw the rest into a bin.

== History ==
Mousavi did not name his movement as a political party or even as a movement, but a "path", because, according to Iranian law, parties and movements need to be authorized by the Interior Ministry and since Mousavi does not recognize the government as legitimate and the ministry is unlikely to grant him permission, he chose this name to bypass the law.

Mousavi is quoted in describing the movement:

The Green Path of Hope is formed for the sake of people’s rightful demands and for claiming their rights... the color green is the symbol of this movement; its slogan is demanding the impeccable implementation of the constitution, and innumerable self-motivated independent societies form the body of this movement.

According to organization officials, the movement functions on a campaign basis, including political parties, NGO's and social networks. Referring to the new movement, Mousavi has said "The Green Path of Hope is formed for the sake of people's rightful demands and for claiming their denied rights". He pointed that autonomous and spontaneous social networks in community are part of this movement. "During election our mottos chose and remained in constitutional frame work, today we are devoted to those slogans" he said. "We believe if people's demands were treated fairly and instead of using media to link spontaneous movements to foreigners, government promoted truth by fair criticism, they could satisfy public views", he added.

== Methods ==
The way has six main members of the central council, that are connected to the reformist parties and movements, NGOs, and the social networks. The main body will be the ordinary protesters. The method is to create pressure from the lower parts of the society and make them connected in a social network, and therefore to lead the protests in a lawful way.

== Members of the Central Council ==
The Green Path of Hope has three central leaders. Hossein Ali Montazeri also had a leading role in the movement in the earlier phase of the movement.

#	Name	Picture	Occupation	Born	Political party
1	Mir-Hossein Mousavi		Former Prime Minister	1942	Independent
2	Mehdi Karroubi		Former Chairman of Parliament	1937	National Trust Party
3	Zahra Rahnavard		Former Chancellor of Alzahra University	1945	Independent

== See also ==
- 2009 Iranian election protests
