= Zahra Rahnavard =

Iranian academic and politician

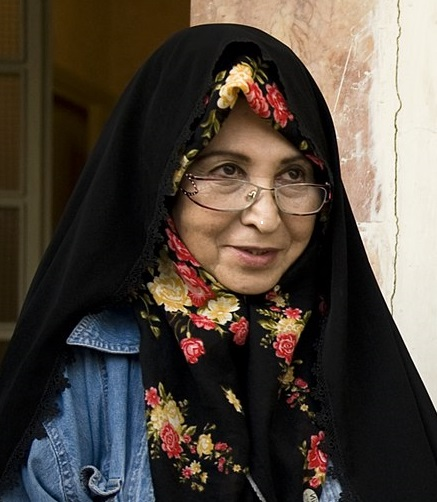
- Born: Zohreh Kazemi; 19 August 1945 (age 81); Borujerd, Imperial State of Iran
- Education: University of Tehran; Islamic Azad University
- Occupation: Academic
- Title: Former Chancellor of Alzahra University
- Political party: The Green Path of Hope (2009–); Association of the Women of the Islamic Republic (1987–)
- Movement: Islamic feminism
- Spouse: Mir-Hossein Mousavi
- Children: 3

Zahra Rahnavard (Persian: زهرا رهنورد; born Zohreh Kazemi; 19 August 1945) is an Iranian academic, artist and politician. Rahnavard is a university professor, artist, and intellectual who has been under house arrest since February 2011. In 2009, Foreign Policy magazine named her one of the world's most distinguished thinkers. She is the wife of former Iran Prime Minister Mir-Hossein Mousavi. In part of her work, she has underlined the need for men to respect the laws of the hijab in the same way as women, as well as a general activist for women's rights in the Middle East.

== Early life ==
Rahnavard was born in Boroojerd, Iran. Her father Haj-Fathali, was a Sh'ia and anti-Communist. After hearing of a gathering of Sh'ia clerics in Iran, Haj-Fathali emigrated to Khomein, Markazi province where Zahra was raised. Zahra Rahnavard earned her bachelor and master's degrees in art and architecture from University of Tehran. She also has master's and PhD degrees from Islamic Azad University in Political science.

== Career ==
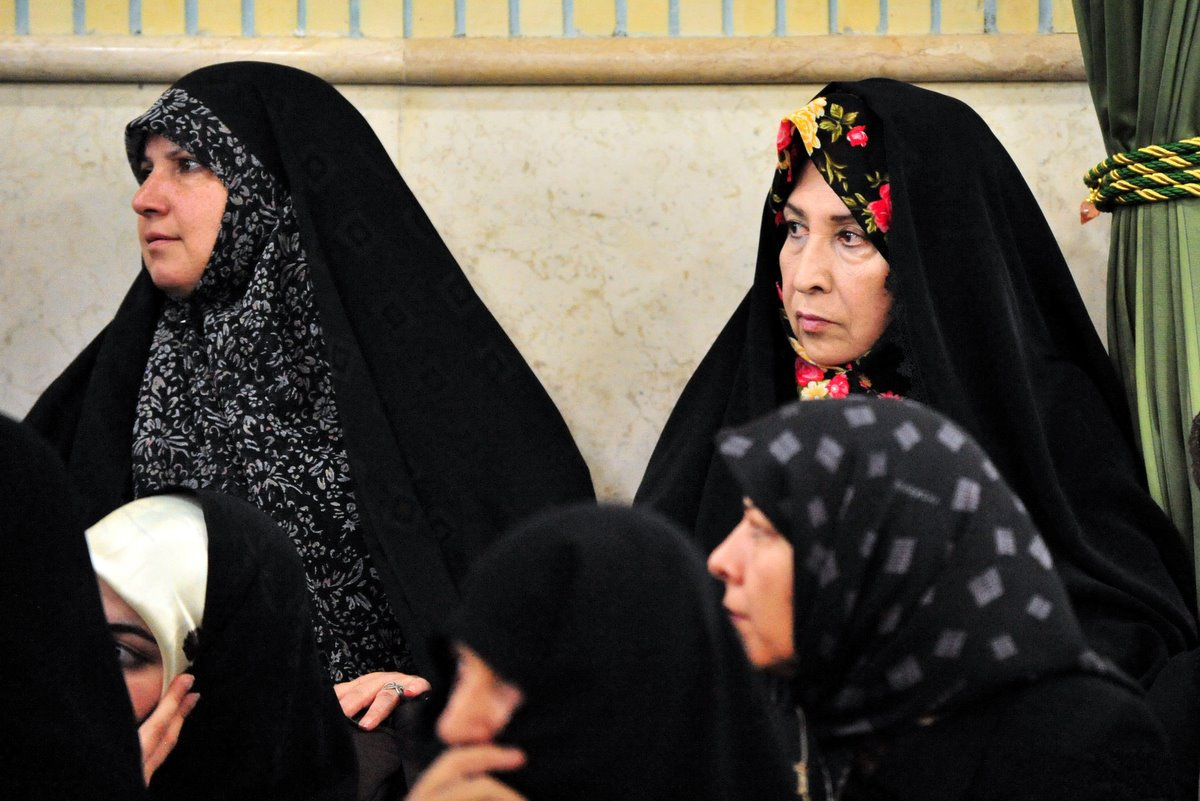
Zahra Rahnavard in 2009

Rahnavard was among the early revolutionaries against the Shah. In the last years of the Shah, she was close to Ali Shariati, a dissident Islamist leader. Rahnavard along with former President Rouhani and Mr. Mir-Hossein Mousavi proposed and pioneered the mandatory Hijab, which went into effect shortly after the revolution.

Rahnavard served as the Chancellor of Alzahra University in Tehran from 1998 to 2006 and as a Political Adviser to the former Iranian President Mohammad Khatami. Rahnavard was the first Iranian woman appointed as a chancellor of a university since the Iranian revolution of 1979. She was nominated to this post by former Minister of Science, Research and Technology, Mostafa Moin. After the election of President Mahmoud Ahmadinejad in 2005 and the purging of reformist officials from the government, Rahnavard was removed (or resigned) from her position as the Chancellor of Al-zahra University in 2006, replaced by Mahboubeh Mobasheri.

As the head of the Women's Social and Cultural Council, established in 1989 as one of seven government committees exploring various social issues, Rahnavard has called for these committees to be more equally represented by women members and has been an outspoken critic of the government's failure to accord women what, in her opinion, are their legitimate social and civil rights under the Qu’ran.

She was an active member of her husband Mir-Hossein Mousavi's campaign when Mousavi entered the 2009 presidential election. Now she is a member of The Green Path of Hope and one of the Opposition's Leaders. Rahnavard is also the author of 15 books.

In February 2009 and more than a year after the protests of the Green Movement, Zahra Rahnavard and her husband Mousavi were placed under house arrest by security agents, and all their communications were cut off.

== Personal life ==
Rahnavard is the wife of Mir-Hossein Mousavi, the former Prime Minister of Iran and had three daughters: Kokab, Narges and Zahra. She and Mousavi married on 18 September 1969. They are currently under house arrest.

== See also ==
- List of Iranian women in academia

Academic offices
Preceded by None	Chancellor of Alzahra University; 1998–2006	Succeeded by Mahboubeh Mobasheri
