= Ahoora (band) =

Iranian progressive rock/metal band

Ahoora is an Iranian rock band from Tehran, formed in 2001.

The band currently consists of Milad Tangshir and Ashkan Hadavand . They have released three albums to date: Ahoora (2006), All in Blood with You (2007), and Awkward Diary (2010).

== History ==
The band started in 2001 and recorded their first demo in 2004. In 2005 they did the first ever metal gig in Iran with vocals. But as rock has been banned in Iran they stayed rather underground, releasing their self-titled debut album in 2006 without official sanction. The album was later re-released by Real2Can, appearing on iTunes in 2007 and on Amazon by 2008.

The band released their second album All in Blood with You in September 2007, which critically was met by some positive feedback. The album was re-mastered and available for free download in 2010.

In March 2010 Zirzamin released their third album Awkward Diary. Classic Rock Magazine described it:

Imagine Muse and Tool getting all cozy around Iced Earth and you’ve got the drift here. The musicianship is accomplished, the songs concise and focused, and the band are clearly battling against the Islamic odds to be heard.

== Influences ==
Ahoora covered a variety of bands which provided great influencer to their sound. These bands included Black Sabbath, Iron Maden and Iced Earth.

== Discography ==
- Ahoora (2006)
- All in Blood with You (2007)
- Awkward Diary (2010)
