= 2009 in Iran =

- Decades: 1980s; 1990s; 2000s; 2010s; 2020s
- See also: Other events of 2009; Years in Iran

Events in the year 2009 in the Islamic Republic of Iran.

== Incumbents ==
- Supreme Leader: Ali Khamenei
- President: Mahmoud Ahmadinejad
- Vice President:
  - until 25 July: Parviz Davoodi
  - 17 July–25 July: Esfandiar Rahim Mashaei
  - starting 13 September: Mohammad Reza Rahimi
- Chief Justice: Mahmoud Hashemi Shahroudi (until 30 June), Sadeq Larijani (starting 30 June)

== Events ==
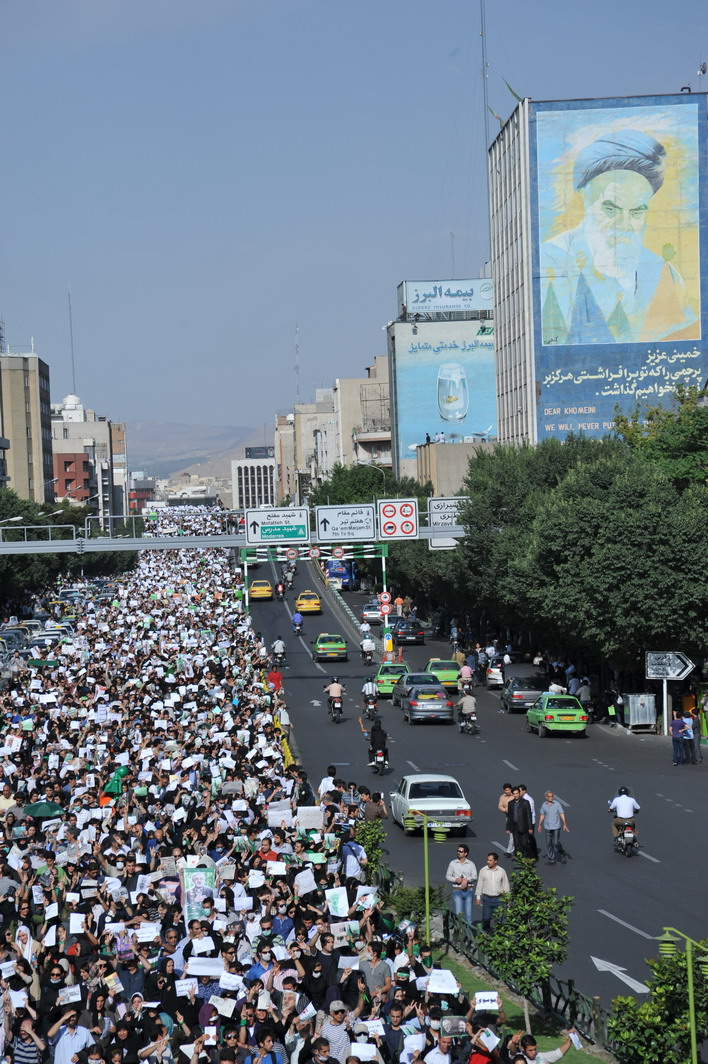
Protesters in Tehran during the 2009 Iranian election protests, 16 June 2009

- February 2 – Iran's first domestically constructed satellite, Omid, is launched.
- March 7 – Morocco terminates diplomatic relations with Iran.
- March 18 – Somali pirates hijack an Iranian fishing vessel in the Gulf of Aden.
- April 18 – Iranian-American journalist Roxana Saberi is charged with espionage and imprisoned in Iran until 2017.
- May 4 – A bus collides with a building in Īlām Province, Iran, killing 28 people and injuring nine others.
- May 20 – Iran launches a Sejjil-2 medium-range surface-to-surface missile.
- May 30 – A bomb is discovered and defused aboard a Kish Air flight between Ahvaz and Tehran, Iran.
- June 12 – Iran goes to the polls for its presidential election.
- June 13 – Mahmoud Ahmadinejad is reelected as the President of Iran, although opposition leader Mir-Hossein Mousavi demands a recount.
- June 20 – A suicide bomb reportedly explodes at the shrine of former Grand Ayatollah Ruhollah Khomeini.
- June 22 – The Iranian Revolutionary Guard warns that it will 'crush' any further protests.
- June 23 – The Guardian Council rules out a re-run of the presidential election saying that there was no sign of serious electoral fraud in the June 12 vote.
- June 24 – Supreme Leader Ayatollah Ali Khamenei declares the recent election result will stand.
- July 15 – Caspian Airlines Flight 7908, flying from Tehran to Yerevan, Armenia with 153 passengers and 15 crew members on board, crashes in Iran shortly after takeoff.
- July 24 – Aria Air Flight 1525 crashes in Mashhad, Iran, killing at least 17 people and injuring 19 of the 153 people on board.
- July 28 – Iran releases 140 people detained in its post-election unrest as the supreme leader orders a prison where jailed protesters were killed be closed.
- July 30 – Iranian police clash with mourners at a Tehranian cemetery for a memorial to those killed in post-election violence, using teargas to disperse crowds from the grave of Neda Agha-Soltan and forcing Opposition leader Mir-Hossein Mousavi to make his exit.
- August 3 – Iran's Supreme Leader Ali Khamenei formally approves the second-term presidency of Mahmoud Ahmadinejad.
- August 5 – Mahmoud Ahmadinejad is sworn in as President of Iran for a second term.
- October 18 – 2009 Pishin bombing: a suicide bomber detonated explosives at a meeting in the southeastern Iranian town of Pishin in Sistan and Baluchestan Province. The attack killed at least 43 people including several senior commanders of Iran's Revolutionary Guards, and injured a further 150. The Sunni rebel organization Jundallah claimed responsibility for the attack.
- November 4 – Around 700 people are injured in two earthquakes in southern Iran.
- November 9 – Three American hikers detained on the border between Iraqi Kurdistan and Iran are to be charged for espionage by Iranian authorities.
- November 29 – The Iranian government approves plans to build 10 new uranium enrichment plants.
- December 28 – Iran declares martial law in Najafabad following a week of protest and 2 days of violence.

=== Full date unknown ===
- United4Iran organization is established.

== Notable deaths ==
- January 30 – Safar Iranpak, 61, Iranian footballer, lung cancer.
- February 2 – Ezzat Negahban, c. 82, Iranian archaeologist.
- March 21 – Khadijeh Saqafi, 93, Iranian widow of religious/political leader Ruhollah Khomeini, after long illness.
- May 1 – Delara Darabi, 22, Iranian convicted murderer, executed by hanging.
- May 15 – Mohammad-Amin Riahi, 86, Iranian historian and literary scholar.
- May 17 – Mohammad-Taqi Bahjat Foumani, 96, Iranian cleric, heart disease.
- June 20 – Neda Agha-Soltan, 26, Iranian student, shot.
- June 29 – Mohammad Hoqouqi, 72, Iranian poet, cirrhosis.
- August 11 – Behjat Sadr, 85, Iranian painter, heart attack.
- September 21 – Parviz Meshkatian, 54, Iranian musician and composer, cardiac arrest.
- November 9 – Mehdi Sahabi, 66, Iranian writer and translator, heart attack.
- November 10 – Ramin Pourandarjani, 26, Iranian doctor, whistleblower on use of torture, poisoned.
- November 11 – Ehsan Fatahian, 28, Iranian Kurdish activist, executed by hanging.
- November 17 – Niku Kheradmand, 77, Iranian actress, complications of a heart attack.
- November 22 – Ali Kordan, 51, Iranian politician, Minister of the Interior (2008), multiple myeloma.
- December 9 – Faramarz Payvar, 77, Iranian composer and santur player, brain damage.
- December 19 – Grand Ayatollah Hussein-Ali Montazeri, 87, Iranian cleric and dissident, natural causes.
