= Verisheh Moradi =

Kurdish activist and Iranian political prisoner

- Other name: Wirishe Moradi
- Citizenship: Iran
- Occupation: Activist
- Known for: Women right activist

Verisheh Moradi (also transliterated as Wirishe Moradi or Warisha Moradi; Kurdish: Werîşe Mûradî, Persian: وریشه مرادی) is a Kurdish political prisoner and women's rights activist sentenced to death by the state of Iran. She was arrested by the Ministry of Intelligence in Sanandaj on 1 August 2023 and imprisoned in Evin Prison in Tehran. In February 2024, Moradi was formally charged with baghi armed rebellion against the state, due to her association with Kurdish opposition groups. In November 2024, Branch Fifteen of the Islamic Revolutionary Court of Tehran sentenced Moradi to death.

== Before arrest ==
In 2014, Moradi was injured in an armed conflict between IS armed groups and Kurdish armed groups in the Kurdish-majority town of Kobani, located in Syria. She has been an influential member of the Kurdish and women's rights activist group Free Women's Society of East Kurdistan or KJAR (Komelgeha Jinên Azad a Rojhelatê Kurdistanê).

== Arrest and detainment ==
Moradi was arrested on 1 August 2023 while traveling by car into Sanandaj as she returned from Kermanshah, where she had been involved in political activities. In an open letter written by Moradi in August 2024, she described agents of the Ministry of Intelligence shooting at the vehicle she was in, then physically assaulting her. Moradi was subsequently detained at the Sanandaj Intelligence Department’s detention center where she was interrogated. After thirteen days, she was transferred to Ward 209 of Evin Prison in Tehran, where she was detained in solitary confinement for five months. On 26 December 2023, she was transferred out of solitary confinement and into the women's ward of the same prison.

In November 2024, the Revolutionary Court sentenced Moradi to death on the charge of "armed rebellion against the state". Her death sentence was however overturned in December 2025. https://www.middleeasteye.net/news/iran-overturns-death-sentence-kurdish-leftist-leader-verisheh-moradi?

== Responses to arrest and death sentence ==
Several international activist groups and individuals have come out in support of Moradi. The human rights organization Amnesty International began a campaign to free Moradi by publishing an open letter to Gholamhossein Mohseni Ejei, Chief Justice of Iran. In November 2024, the Kurdistan Human Rights Network issued a joint statement with 17 other human rights organizations calling for the annulment of the death sentences of Verisheh Moradi and fellow Iranian political prisoner Pakhshan Azizi. Other signatories include United4Iran, PEN America, Mehrangiz Kar, and the Kurdistan Human Rights Association-Geneva (KMMK-G).

== See also ==
- Zahra Tabari, a human rights activist currently on death row on the same charges as Moradi.
- Pakhshan Azizi, a human rights activist currently on death row on the same charges as Moradi.
- Sharifeh Mohammadi, a human rights activist currently on death row on the same charges as Moradi.
