= Pakhshan Azizi =

Iranian Human rights activist and Political prisoner

- په‌خشان عه‌زیزی
- Born: August 7, 1984 (age 42); Mahabad, Iran
- Education: Allameh Tabataba'i University
- Occupation: Social worker
- Known for: Human rights activism

Pakhshan Azizi (Persian: پخشان عزیزی; Sorani Kurdish: په‌خشان عه‌زیزی; born 7 August 1984 in Mahabad, Iran) is a Kurdish-Iranian human rights activist currently recognized as a political prisoner in Iran. In July 2024, she was sentenced to death on charges of "armed rebellion against the state". She was additionally given a four-year prison term for alleged affiliation with the Kurdistan Free Life Party (PJAK). Her legal representatives have denied these allegations.

== Biography ==
Pakhshan Azizi was born on 7 August 1984, (Note: Azizi was born on the fifth of Shahrivar 1363. (Solar Hijri calendar)) to a Kurdish family living in Mahabad, Iran. She attended and graduated from Allameh Tabataba'i University in Tehran with a degree in social work. On 16 November 2009, while attending the university, Azizi protested alongside other Kurdish students against political executions in Kurdistan. She was arrested and detained for her participation in the protest. After being released on bail on March 19, 2010, after four months of detention, Azizi moved to the Kurdistan region of Iraq. In 2015, Azizi began working in northeast Syria as a social worker, supporting refugees and victims of the Islamic State.

== Political activism and incarceration ==
Azizi was arrested at her parents' home in Shahrak-e Kharrazi, Tehran by the Ministry of Intelligence on 4 August 2023. Azizi's father, Aziz Azizi, sister Pershang (also referred to as Pashang) Azizi and husband Hossein Abbasi, were also arrested. Azizi's family members were released after several days of interrogation, while Azizi was detained in Ward 209 of Evin Prison in solitary confinement for several months, during which time she reported being physically beaten and tortured to extract confessions, denied legal representation, and denied visits with family. On 11 December 2023, Azizi was transferred to the women's ward of Evin Prison. In February 2024, Azizi was formally charged with baghi, armed insurrection, by Branch Five of the Evin Security Prosecutor's Office. On July 23, 2024, Azizi's lawyers were informed that Azizi had been sentenced to death by Branch 26 of the Islamic Revolutionary Court.

On 17 January 2025, Khaled Ali-Panah, a cousin of Verisheh Moradi and spokesperson for the "Campaign for Freedom," informed BBC Persian that Moradi, Azizi, and seven other women imprisoned in Evin Prison had been placed incommunicado. They were deprived of the right to communicate with their families and legal representatives.This followed the broadcast of a program by the Fars News Agency, an outlet affiliated with the Islamic Revolutionary Guard Corps (IRGC), which targeted Azizi and Moradi which he said was a fabrication. The program accused them of being affiliated with the PJAK organization, participating in the Mahsa Amini protests, (Note: 1401 Protests (Solar Hijri calendar)) and returning to Iran to advance their activities against the government, alleging their presence in "safe houses."

In January 2025, Azizi's Article 474 appeal request was rejected by Branch 39 of the Supreme Court of Iran. Her lawyers were informed of the decision on 5 February. Azizi's lawyer, Amir Raeesian, published a statement to social media stating that the judge of Branch 39 had mistakenly believed Azizi was a member of ISIS when, in fact, Azizi's humanitarian work had focused on providing aid to people displaced by ISIS. Raeesian believed this false belief led to the ruling against Azizi's appeal.

The Kurdish Red Crescent and the Shams Rehabilitation Organization, located in northeastern Syria, provided translated official letters that attest to Azizi's humanitarian work. Her brother, Asu Azizi, presented these documents to the BBC Persian. In a social media statement, Asu urged the public to assist his sister, who was being falsely accused. He further informed the BBC that a laptop, containing vital documents related to her work with international organizations was confiscated by the Ministry of Intelligence. This evidence has not been presented in court or formally documented.

Asu Azizi has also provided various confirmations from three international organizations operating in the Kurdistan region of Iraq and Syria, which affirm that Pakhshan has engaged in voluntary social work with their entities.

One particular letter, signed by Maja Hess, the founder of a Swiss non-profit humanitarian organization engaged in health-related initiatives across several countries, including northeastern Syria, affirms that Pakhshan Azizi volunteered in social work, specifically aiding women and children in distress at the Nowruz camp located in the Derik area for refugees from Shingal. Another letter from the Shams Rehabilitation and Development Organization indicates that Pakhshan Azizi provided social work services at the Al-Hawl refugee camp in Al-Hasakah from September 2017 to December 2021, where she assisted women and children who had been victims of war and violence. Additionally, correspondence from the Red Crescent of Northeast Syria confirms Pakhshan Azizi's role as a volunteer social worker at the Nowruz camp from December 2014 to August 2017.

In an audio statement published by the BBC, Aziz Azizi, Pakhshan's father, stressed that his daughter was indeed a social worker and that her activities were consistently peaceful throughout all stages of her legal case. He remarked, "The circumstances surrounding Pakhshan's case lack logical consistency; it is implausible for an individual to undertake simultaneous short-term training in dentistry, politics, and military affairs."

== Response and support ==
On 16 July 2024, the Coalition For Women in Journalism issued a statement in solidarity with Azizi, condemning her arrest and treatment in detainment. On 24 July 2024, the day after Azizi was notified of her sentence, female political prisoners at the Evin Prison staged a sit-in protesting Azizi's death sentence. On 9 September 2024, the Center for Human Rights in Iran issued a joint statement alongside twenty-five other human rights organizations urging Iran to revoke Azizi's death sentence. Other signatories of the statement include The Hengaw Organization for Human Rights, United4Iran, Justice for Iran, and Iran Human Rights (IHRNGO). The human rights organization Amnesty International launched a campaign on Azizi's behalf on September 30, 2024. The organization published an open model letter addressed to Gholamhossein Mohseni Ejei, the Chief Justice of Iran, encouraging people to write their own appeals on Azizi's behalf or use the model letter. The Women's Committee of the National Council of Resistance of Iran issued a statement condemning Azizi's death sentence January 8, 2025.

On February 18, 2025, the City Council of Florence unanimously approved granting Azizi honorary citizenship. Council member and head of the Florence Equal Opportunities Commission Stefania Collesei said the decision was part of an effort to "ensure she [Azizi] is saved from an unjust death sentence."

=== United Nations Experts Respond to Supreme Court's Affirmation of Death Sentence ===
On January 14, 2025, a consortium of United Nations independent human rights experts articulated significant concern regarding the Iranian Supreme Court’s decision to affirm the death sentence of Pakhshan Azizi. The experts stated, “The charges against Pakhshan Azizi do not satisfy the criteria of ‘most serious crimes’ as mandated by international law for the application of the death penalty. Her death sentence represents a severe transgression of international human rights law.” They further asserted that Azizi’s arrest and subsequent sentencing appear to be primarily linked to her legitimate engagements as a social worker, including her support for refugees from Iraq and Syria.

The United Nations experts expressed alarm upon receiving reports that Azizi had endured severe psychological and physical torture in solitary confinement, ostensibly to extract a confession. Additionally, she has reportedly been denied visitation by family members and access to legal representation of her choosing. It has been alleged that several relatives of Azizi had also been temporarily detained and faced national security charges, presumably as a means to coerce her into providing a confession. “The utilization of torture for confession extraction and the infringement of fair trial rights render the death sentence imposed upon Azizi distinctly arbitrary,” they stated.

The experts highlighted their considerable concern regarding the rising number of executions in Iran, which surpassed 900 in the year 2024, including an alarming increase in the execution of women. They emphasized the imperative for Iran to cease executions that contravene international legal standards and violate fundamental human rights. The experts indicated, “We are particularly apprehensive about the systematic targeting of Kurdish women activists through politically motivated accusations. Azizi’s prosecution exemplifies the intensified persecution faced by minority women activists in Iran and reflects an ongoing intent to silence them, fostering a pervasive atmosphere of fear.” They called upon the Iranian authorities to immediately rescind the death sentence against Pakhshan Azizi, investigate allegations of torture and violations of fair trial rights, and halt the harassment and targeting of women activists within Iran. The experts have declared that they are currently engaging in discussions with the Iranian government concerning this pressing matter.

=== Green Movement Leader ===
Zahra Rahnavard, a prominent leader of the Iranian Green Movement, has called for the annulment of the death sentence imposed on Pakhshan Azizi. In a message confirmed by BBC Persian, Rahnavard asserted, "The authorities have a responsibility to revoke the death sentence of Pakhshan Azizi, a socially conscious activist, and to effect her release." She underscored that the cancellation of this sentence should serve as a pivotal action that opens the doors of prisons and reunites all advocates for freedom with society, prioritizing the liberation of women incarcerated throughout our cherished nation, Iran. Accompanying her message, Zahra Rahnavard shared a painting dedicated to "the courageous women of Iran who endure the oppression of tyranny," concluding her statement with the slogan "Woman, Life, Freedom," which has its origins in Kurdish culture.

== See also ==
- Zahra Tabari, a human rights activist currently on death row on the same charges as Azizi.
- Verisheh Moradi, a human rights activist currently on death row on the same charges as Azizi.
- Sharifeh Mohammadi, a human rights activist currently on death row on the same charges as Azizi.
