= Holly McQuillan =

New Zealand designer

Holly McQuillan is a New Zealand designer specialising in zero waste garment design and zero-waste fashion, a field in which she is considered "[one] of the most prominent proponents". She is an assistant professor at Delft University, and the co-author of Zero Waste Fashion Design with Timo Rissanen.

== Early life and education ==
She holds a BDes and an MDes from Massey University and completed a PhD in sustainable fashion design practice at the Swedish School of Textiles, in Högskolan I Borås (University of Borås) in Sweden.

== Career ==
McQuillan co-founded Space Between, a green business model for fashion design which acts as a platform for social innovation and enterprise, with Massey University colleague Jennifer Whitty. In 2015, Te Papa acquired a collection of up-cycled garments from the Space Between Fundamentals range for their collection.

In 2015, ObjectSpace in Auckland, New Zealand held a show of her experimental zero-waste and modifiable clothing collection Make/Use. Make/Use is a system for open source, user-modifiable, zero-waste fashion practice.

Since 2021 she has been assistant professor in Materialising futures in the Industrial Design Engineering department of Delft University of Technology in the Netherlands. She was previously senior lecturer in design in the College of Creative Arts at Massey University in New Zealand.

== Selected publications ==
- Rissanen, Timo; McQuillan, Holly (2015). Zero Waste Fashion Design. Fairchild. ISBN 978-1472581983.
