= Zahra Tabari =

Iranian human rights activist

- زهرا شهباز طبری
- Born: 1958 (age 67–68); Babol, Pahlavi Iran
- Citizenship: Iran
- Education: Isfahan University of Technology; University of Borås
- Occupation: Electrical engineer
- Known for: Participating in the Mahsa Amini protests
- Criminal charges: Armed rebellion
- Criminal penalty: Death
- Criminal status: Imprisoned

Zahra Shahbaz Tabari (Persian: زهرا شهباز طبری; born c. 1958) is an Iranian electrical engineer and activist. In 2025, she was sentenced to death on charges of "armed rebellion" after she was found to possess a cloth printed with the "Woman, Life, Freedom" slogan.

== Personal life ==
Tabari was born in Babol, Mazandaran province in what was then the Imperial State of Iran. She graduated with a bachelor's degree in electrical engineering from Isfahan University of Technology, before obtaining a master's degree in sustainable energy from the University of Borås in Sweden. Tabari went on to work for 30 years as an electrical engineer and sustainable energy specialist for the Gilan Electricity Administration.

Tabari had two children and lived in Rasht, Gilan province. She was retired at the point of her arrest in 2025.

== Arrest, trial and sentence ==
Tabari had previously been arrested in May 2022 following posts she had made on social media; after being detained for three months, she was charged with "spreading propaganda against the Islamic Republic" and released under house arrest for 18 months, in addition to being ordered to pay a fine and wear an electronic ankle monitor for a year.

On 17 April 2025, Tabari was arrested at her home in northwestern Rasht by several police officers. It was reported that there was no warrant issued for her arrest, and several electronic items were seized from her home. Tabari was able to call her children later that day and confirmed that she was being held at Lakan Prison. She was detained for a month in solitary confinement, during which she was regularly interrogated and allegedly subjected to psychological trauma. Tabari was subsequently charged with baghi (armed rebellion against the foundations of the Islamic Republic of Iran), as well as of being a member of the People's Mojahedin Organization of Iran, a banned political organisation. Tabari's family denied she had been a member.

Tabari's trial was delayed following the outbreak of the Twelve-Day War between Iran and Israel in June 2025; it took place on 25 October at Branch 2 of the Revolutionary Court of Rasht. The hearing, which took place online and lasted around 10 minutes, cited the evidence against her, including a cloth with the slogan "woman, life, freedom", and an unsent audio message found on Tabari's mobile phone. Tabari was not given access to her own lawyer; the state-appointed lawyer allegedly endorsed the guilty verdict requested by prosecutors. The judge found Tabari guilty, and a death sentence was issued immediately following the hearing.

Tabari's arrest, trial and sentence were not reported on in the Iranian media.

== Response ==
In a letter Tabari wrote to the children, she alleged that the hearing had been plagued by technical difficulties, and that the court paperwork suggested that the death sentence had been issued on 4 October 2025, prior to the trial happening. Tabari also stated her denial of the charges brought against her was not recorded in the court order.

The Women's Committee of the National Council of Resistance of Iran called on the United Nations and international governments to intervene to save Tabari's life, as well as the lives of other people sentenced to death in Iran, which it called "a crime against humanity".

A United Nations panel of experts called on Iran to "immediately stop" Tabari's execution, describing her trial as containing a "pattern of serious violations of international human rights law", including the International Covenant on Civil and Political Rights, which restricted the use of the death penalty to the "most serious crimes", and had been ratified by Iran in 1975.

A group of 400 prominent women also signed a statement urging Iran not to execute Tabari, issued by Justice for the Victims of the 1988 Massacre in Iran, describing her trial as a "sham". Signatories included Yulia Tymoshenko, Micheline Calmy-Rey, Anneli Jäätteenmäki, Oleksandra Matviichuk and Jody Williams.

== See also ==
- Pakhshan Azizi, a human rights activist currently on death row on the same charges as Tabari.
- Verisheh Moradi, a human rights activist currently on death row on the same charges as Tabari.
- Sharifeh Mohammadi, a human rights activist currently on death row on the same charges as Tabari.
