= Olof Sundin =

Swedish academic

Olof Sundin (born 1968) is a Swedish professor of information studies at the Department of Arts and Cultural Sciences at Lund University.

== Career ==
Olof Sundin received a library diploma and a Master of Arts in library and information science, both from the Swedish School of Library and Information Science at the University of Borås. He obtained a Ph.D. in library and information science from University of Gothenburg in 2003. After working at University College of Borås, University of Gothenburg and the Royal School of Library and Information Science in Copenhagen, he moved to Lund University, where he was a senior lecturer before being promoted to full professor in 2011.

== Research ==
Sundin has conducted research on, amongst other topics, Wikipedia, search engines and information literacy. He is the leader of the research group ”Information practices: Communication, Culture and Society" at Lund University and the theme “Of Search and its Engines” at the Pufendorf Institute for Advanced Studies.

He is the co-author of Invisible Search and Online Search Engines: The ubiquity of search in everyday life (with Jutta Haider). In 2016, he was, together with Jutta Haider, commissioned by the Swedish Prime Minister’s Office’s Secretariat for Strategic Development for the Future to write a report on algorithms in society, which was presented to the State Secretary Maja Fjaestad.

Sundin is a member of the permanent committee for “Information Seeking in Context” (ISIC) and a member of the Editorial Advisory Board for Journal of Documentation.
