= 2008 in Iran =

- Decades: 1980s; 1990s; 2000s; 2010s; 2020s
- See also: Other events of 2008; Years in Iran

The following lists events that happened during 2008 in the Islamic Republic of Iran.

== Incumbents ==
- Supreme Leader: Ali Khamenei
- President: Mahmoud Ahmadinejad
- Vice President: Parviz Davoodi
- Chief Justice: Mahmoud Hashemi Shahroudi

== Events ==
=== February ===
- February 4 – Iran launches the Kavoshgar-1 research rocket to inaugurate a newly built space center.

=== March ===
- March 14 – Iranian voters go to the polls in the legislative election. Nearly 90 percent of reformist candidates have been disqualified from the election.
- March 16 – The Conservative Alliance wins the Iranian legislative election.

=== August ===
- August 12 – The United States Department of the Treasury imposes sanctions on five Iranian companies for assisting the development of the nuclear program of Iran.
- August 17 – Iran announces it has launched a satellite launch-capable Safir rocket.

== Notable deaths ==
- January 9 – Mehran Ghassemi, 30, Iranian journalist, heart failure.
- January 13 – Jafar Shahidi, 89, Iranian linguist and historian.
- January 20 – Ghorban Soleimani, 87, Iranian vocalist and dotar player.
- February 2 – Ahmad Bourghani, 48, Iranian politician, heart failure.
- February 6 – Nikol Faridani, 72, Iranian aerial photographer, prostate cancer.
- March 5 – Nader Khalili, 72, Iranian architect, heart failure.
- March 21 – Shusha Guppy, 72, Iranian writer and singer.
- March 23 – Maryam Farman Farmaian, 94, Iranian feminist activist.
- April 12 – Abbas Katouzian, 86, Iranian painter.
- April 15 – Parvin Dowlatabadi, 84, Iranian children's author and poet, heart attack.
- April 29 – Hassan Dehqani-Tafti, 87, Iranian Anglican Bishop, first ethnic Iranian Christian bishop since the 7th century.
- July 18 – Khosrow Shakibai, 64, Iranian actor, liver cancer.
- October 9 – Ardeshir Mohassess, 70, Iranian illustrator and cartoonist, heart attack.
- October 10 – Javad Nurbakhsh, 81, Iranian spiritual leader.
- October 25 – Tahereh Saffarzadeh, 72, Iranian poet and academic, cancer.
