= Jutta Haider =

Jutta Haider (born 1973 in Villach, Austria) is a Swedish-Austrian professor of information studies at the University of Borås, School of Library and Information Science.

== Career ==
Haider received her Mag. phil. in German philology from the University of Vienna in 1999, a MSc in Information Science in 2003 and a Ph.D. in Information Science in 2008, both from City, University of London. Her Ph.D. supervisor was David Bawden. She was an assistant and then an associate professor at Lund University (2008-2020) before becoming a full professor at the University of Borås, where she has been a professor at the Swedish School of Library and Information Science since 2020.

== Research ==
Jutta Haider’s research interests are information practices, digital culture, and the use and distribution of knowledge and information. She has published extensively on topics such as environmental information, encyclopedias, search engines, and scholarly communication. She is the co-author of “Invisible Search and Online Search Engines: The ubiquity of search in everyday life” (with Olof Sundin). Together with Ola Pilerot, Prof. Haider leads the research group “Information Practices” at the University of Borås. In 2016, she was, together with Olof Sundin, commissioned by the Swedish Prime Minister’s Office’s Secretariat for Strategic Development for the Future to write a report on algorithms in society, which was presented to the State Secretary Maja Fjaestad.
