= Sharifeh Mohammadi =

Iranian social activist (born 1979)

- شریفه محمّدی
- Born: 1979 (age 46–47); Mianeh, Iran
- Occupations: Political prisoner, labor activist
- Spouse: Sirous Fathi

Sharifeh Mohammadi (Persian: شریفه محمّدی) is an Iranian social activist and political prisoner sentenced to death in Iran. She was arrested in December 2023 and on 4 July 2024 was sentenced to death by the Islamic Revolutionary Court in Rasht on the charge of baghi (armed rebellion). The judge cited her former membership in the labor organization “Committee to Help Form Workers’ Organizations,” dating back more than a decade, as grounds for the charge. Although the Supreme Court of Iran overturned the initial verdict in October 2024 due to "flaws and ambiguities," it upheld a renewed death sentence in August 2025, a decision that has drawn widespread condemnation from human rights organizations.

== Arrest and torture ==
On 5 December 2023, Mohammadi was arrested at her home in Rasht, Iran on the charge of “propaganda against the state.” She was immediately transferred to a security detention center in Sanandaj, and a baghi charge was added later. Reports state that during interrogation and in solitary confinement she was subjected to torture and pressure to confess. She was also denied telephone contact with her 12-year-old child and family, as well as access to a lawyer. BBC Persian reported that interrogators from Sanandaj Intelligence tortured her, with former prisoners claiming to have seen bruises and marks of torture on her body.

== Death sentence ==
On 4 July 2024, Branch One of the Revolutionary Court in Rasht, presided over by Judge Ahmad Darvish-Goftar, found Mohammadi guilty of baghi (armed insurgency against the Islamic Republic) and sentenced her to death. The court alleged that the “Committee to Help Form Workers’ Organizations” was linked to Komala. The Committee has rejected this claim, describing it as “a pretext to suppress social activists and labor organizations.” Mohammadi herself had not been a member since 2011.

In October 2024, Branch 39 of the Supreme Court of Iran overturned the death sentence and referred the case back for retrial. However, on 12 February 2025, Branch Two of the Revolutionary Court in Rasht, again presided by Judge Darvish-Goftar, reinstated the death sentence on the charge of baghi through alleged membership in an opposition group.

In August 2025, the Supreme Court upheld the renewed death sentence despite having previously overturned it for "flaws and ambiguities." Mohammadi’s lawyer, Amir Raeesian, told the daily Sharq that the new verdict repeated the same problems and announced his intention to appeal. Her cousin, Vida Mohammadi, stated that the case was based on a scenario "fabricated by the Intelligence Ministry" and that the presiding judge of the second court was the son of the judge who had issued the initial death sentence.

== Reactions ==
The sentence sparked widespread reactions from domestic and international human rights organizations and activists. On 9 July 2024, social media users launched a Twitter storm under the banner “Campaign to Defend Sharifeh Mohammadi.”

- The Syndicate of Workers of Tehran and Suburbs Bus Company and labor activist Reza Shahabi condemned the charge and demanded her immediate and unconditional release.
- Human rights NGO Front Line Defenders called for her immediate release.
- The Australian Construction Workers’ Union sent a protest letter to Iran’s embassy in Australia.
- Civil activist Gohar Eshghi, mother of Sattar Beheshti, declared her innocence in an Instagram post.
- Sixteen female prisoners, including Narges Mohammadi, Golrokh Iraee, Aneesha Asadollahi, Vida Rabbani, and Sepideh Gholian, issued a joint statement declaring: “This is not only Sharifeh’s death sentence, but the death sentence of all of us.”
- Fifteen religious reformist intellectuals, including Jila Movahed, Mohammad-Javad Akbarin, and Ezzatollah Bazargan, described the ruling as “unbelievable” and demanded its reversal.
- Eighty-five political prisoners in Evin Prison went on hunger strike to protest the death sentence.
- Amnesty International urged Iran to revoke her conviction and death sentence.
- On 27 July 2024, during the Third Iraqi Women’s Conference in Baghdad, a group of Iraqi and Yazidi women launched the campaign “No to Execution, Yes to a Free Life” in protest against her sentence and that of Pakhshan Azizi.

== See also ==
- Pakhshan Azizi
- Reza Shahabi
- Zahra Tabari
- Verisheh Moradi
