= 2006 in Iran =

- Decades: 1980s; 1990s; 2000s; 2010s; 2020s
- See also: Other events of 2006; Years in Iran

The following lists events that happened during 2006 in Iran.

== Incumbents ==
- Supreme Leader: Ali Khamenei
- President: Mahmoud Ahmadinejad
- Vice President: Parviz Davoodi
- Chief Justice: Mahmoud Hashemi Shahroudi

== Events ==
=== January ===
- January 1 – Iranian President Mahmoud Ahmadinejad accuses European nations of trying to complete the Holocaust by creating a "Jewish camp" Israel in the Middle East. "Don't you think that continuation of genocide by expelling Jews from Europe was one of their aims in creating a regime of occupiers of Al-Quds (Jerusalem) Isn't that an important question?" He went on to say that Europe should cede some of their territory for a Jewish state, and that anti-Semitism has a long history in Europe, while Jews have lived peacefully among Muslims for centuries.
- January 4 – A leaked intelligence report states that Iran has been "successfully scouring Europe" for the equipment needed to create a nuclear bomb, as well as parts for a ballistic missile.
- January 12 – The foreign ministers of Britain, France, and Germany declare that negotiations with Iran over its nuclear program have reached a "dead end." They recommend that Iran be referred to the United Nations Security Council, where the nation may face sanctions.
- January 15 – The Foreign Ministry of Iran announced it will hold a conference to evaluate the validity of the Holocaust, which President Mahmoud Ahmadinejad recently referred to as a "myth".
- January 16 – Iran bans CNN from the country after a translator mistranslated a remark by President Mahmoud Ahmadinejad, in which he defended Iran's right to nuclear energy. The comment was translated as the right to construct nuclear weapons.
- January 19 – Iran warns of a world oil crisis if sanctions are imposed over its nuclear program even as the United States and Europe struggle to get support for UN Security Council action.
- January 20 – Israel says it has proof that Iran financed the bombing of a fast-food restaurant in Tel Aviv, and that Syria carried it out.
- January 24 – A bomb in Ahvaz kills six and injures up to 40. Iranian President Mahmoud Ahmadinejad was due to have visited the city today, however the trip was called off at the last minute. Lebanon's al-Manar television said the president had called off his trip after a security tip-off. Local MP Nezam Molla-Hoveyzeh accused Britain of being behind the attack. Later, US President George Bush warns Iran over threat of "retaliation" against Israel. Moqtada Sadr has vowed to defend Iran.
- January 26 – Pakistani President Pervez Musharraf rejects US objections to a proposed Iran–Pakistan–India pipeline for natural gas saying "It is in our economic interest. If somebody wants to stop us they should compensate us ... But at the moment we are going ahead". Musharraf also repeats his condemnation of the recent U.S. air strike in northern Pakistan which killed 18 people, including women and children.
- January 26 – In the long running dispute over Iran's nuclear program, the ambassador of the United States to India, David Mulford, has warned India to back the US plan to refer Iran to the United Nations Security Council or face cancellation of a US-India nuclear deal.
- January 27 – President Mikhail Saakashvili of Georgia pledges to end his country's energy crisis by importing Iranian natural gas. Starting Monday, Georgia will import 2 million m3 of gas a day at $120/m3, $10 more than for Russian gas. Georgia's supply of Russian gas has been interrupted since Sunday due to pipeline explosions. Saakashvili has accused Moscow of sabotage for political gain.
- January 31 – Iran's nuclear program
  - Iran reacts with anger to its referral to the U.N. Security Council, saying diplomatic avenues have been closed.
  - The International Atomic Energy Agency has announced it has evidence within its report for the Thursday meeting that Iran obtained documents showing how to mold highly enriched grade uranium into the core of warheads.

=== March ===
- March 31 - The 6.1 M_{w} Borujerd earthquake affected western Iran with a maximum Mercalli intensity of VIII (Severe), leaving 63–70+ dead, and 1,246–1,418 injured.

=== April ===
- April 11 – President of Iran Mahmoud Ahmadinejad confirms that Iran had successfully produced a few grams of 3.5% low-enriched uranium.
- April 20 – Iran announces a uranium enrichment deal with Russia, involving a joint uranium enrichment firm on Russian soil. Nine days later Iran announced that it would not move all activity to Russia, thus leading to a de facto termination of the deal.

=== June ===
- June 21 – Iran is eliminated from FIFA World Cup after losing 3–1 and 2–0 to Mexico and Portugal, and a 1–1 tie game with Angola in the group stage.

=== August ===
- August 16 – Defensive wall of a huge fortress belonging to the Parthian dynastic era is discovered in Nader Tepe by archeologists.
- August 19 – "Blow of Zolfaqar" war-games begin in southeastern Iran.
- August 26 – President Ahmadinejad launches new heavy-water-production plant in Arak.
- August 28 – Archeological excavations behind Gotvand Dam lead to discovery of 15 fortresses belonging to the Parthian, Sassanid and Islamic periods as well as 15 catacombs belonging to the Parthian dynastic era.
- August 28 – President Ahmadinejad has told German Chancellor that the Holocaust may have been invented by the victorious Allied powers in World War II to embarrass Germany.
- August 30 – US Grants Visa to former Iranian President Khatami.

=== September ===
- September 1 – Iran plane crash kills at least 29 at Mashhad airport.
- September 1 – Iran fails to stop enriching uranium despite a UN deadline calling for a halt to its nuclear programme.
- September 2 – Iran draws an AFC Asian Cup 2007 qualifier in Seoul against South Korea 1-1 with Hashemian's stoppage-time equalizer.
- September 4 – Iran finishes runner-up to Russia at the World Under-20 Freestyle Wrestling Championships in Guatemala.
- September 7 – Iran stands second at the world taekwondo Poomse competitions in the South Korean capital Seoul.
- September 12 – Iran discovers formula to cure AIDS: Health Minister; two-year effect on the body is guaranteed.
- September 20 – Anti-Zionist Jews welcome Ahmadinejad to New York.
- September 27 – Iran's Mohammadi and Surian grab gold in the final of the 2006 world freestyle competitions in Guangzhou, China.
- September 29 – Iran is ranked second at the 2006 World Freestyle Wrestling Championships. With one gold, one silver, and two bronze medals, the Iranian side finished runner-up to Russia.

=== October ===
- October 2 – A cloned sheep in good health and condition is born in Isfahan.
- October 2 – Iranian director Bahman Qobadi's "Half Moon" is picked to represent Iraq alongside the Iranian entry "Border Café" at next year's Oscars.
- October 3 – At least 40 followers of Ayatollah Boroujerdi—who urges separation of religion from the political basis of the state—are arrested.
- October 3 – Iranian taekwondo phenom Maysam Rafiei grabs the 58 kg gold medal of the 2006 world armies tournament in South Korea.
- October 4 – The contents of a letter by the late Ayatollah Khomeini, former leader of Iran, is revealed by Iran's former president Ayatollah Rafsanjani. The letter urges pursuit of nuclear weapons to be deployed against Iran's hostile neighbor, Iraq.
- October 8 – Iranian Hercules Rezazadeh wins gold medal in weightlifting world championships.
- October 11 – Iran makes blood cholesterol reducing tablet, Ezetimibe.
- October 12 – Iran heads into AFC Asian Cup finals after defeating Taiwan 2-0.
- October 15 – Hossein Rowhani ends Iran's 10-year world karate gold drought snatching the 60 kg kumite title in the 18th edition in Finland.
- October 16 – Iran finishes fifth in World Karate Championships with two gold and two bronze medals.
- October 16 – Iranian runner Hossein Fazeli wins world cross-country title in Sweden Sunday.
- October 17 – 1700-year-old Sassanid Watermill is discovered in Takht-e Soleiman by archeological excavations.
- October 19 – The poet, Parvin Etesami's house becomes national heritage site.
- October 20 – U.S. Sends Warships to Persian Gulf, including the nuclear-powered aircraft carrier U.S.S. Eisenhower, a cruiser, destroyer, frigate, submarine and a supply ship.
- October 22 – Iran's Agriculture jihad minister, Mohammad-Reza Eskandari survives Majlis impeachment receiving the parliament's vote of confidence.
- October 23 – The Iranian film, "Tears of Cold" wins the best film award in the 4th edition of Mountain film festival in Germany.
- October 26 – The Iranian government and Lebanese militia group Hezbollah is formally charged over the 1994 bombing of a Jewish centre in Buenos Aires.
- October 27 – Iran installs second network of centrifuges for uranium enrichment.
- October 28 – Iranian President Mahmoud Ahmadinejad fires the minister for cooperatives, Mohammad Nazemi Ardekani.

=== November ===
- November 1 – North Korea defeats Iran in AFC Youth Championship 5 to 0.
- November 4 – Iran begins the second stage of its war-games in north Persian Gulf.
- November 6 – Fereydoun Hoveyda, a former Iranian ambassador to the United Nations dies of cancer at the age of 82.
- November 6 – Iran hangs six 'tourist kidnappers' in public; six members of a Sunni "terrorist" group convicted of abducting European tourists and armed robbery were hanged in the southeastern city of Zahedan.
- November 7 – Iran is crowned at the first Asian men's jujitsu tournament in Almaty, Kazakhstan Monday night. The championship came as the Iranian team snatched two golds, two silvers, and one bronze.
- November 9 – Iran concludes war-games in north Persian Gulf, the last stage of which "the Great Prophet" was held in the north of the Persian Gulf in Khuzestan province.
- November 11 – A senior Israeli official suggest that Israel might launch a pre-emptive strike against Iran to prevent it from acquiring nuclear weapons, demanding tougher international action to stop Iran.
- November 12 – Iran lifts Croatia Taekwondo title, The seven-strong Iranian team stood top among 30 participating countries with four golds and three silvers.
- November 12 – Iranian figures of stage is honored veteran actress Mehri Mehrnia at Tehran Theater Complex Saturday night, accidentally marking her 90th birthday anniversary.
- November 14 – Iran's president Mr. Ahmadinejad says he is ready to talk to the United States if there was a change of attitude in Washington, which faces pressure to deal directly with Tehran to help ease violence in Iraq.
- November 14 – The arrest warrants for former Iranian president Ali Akbar Rafsanjani and six other former top Iranian officials were issued only after the United States had applied diplomatic pressure
- November 15 – Iran's Pars Gas and Oil Company reaches final agreements with Total on the expansion of South Pars oil field's phase 11, which will have the capacity to produce daily 50 million cubic meters of sour gas so to produce 10 million cubic meters of LNG and 70 million cubic meters of other various liquid gases.
- November 15 – President Ahmadinejad declares that Iran will celebrate nuclear victory soon.
- November 15 – Iran crushes South Korea 2-0 in Tehran in AFC Asian Cup 2007 qualifiers.
- November 24 – The Father of Iranian Modern Journalism, Dr Mostafa Mesbahzadeh dies at the age of 97.

=== Undated ===
- Tehran Has No More Pomegranates!, musical-comedy film is released.

== Legal Issues ==
- January 2006 - Nuclear Program Dispute. Iran violates previous international agreement by breaking UN seals on uranium facilities in Natanz.
- February 4 - The International Atomic Energy Agency (IAEA) refers Iran to the UN Security Council due to noncompliance with the Nuclear Non-Proliferation Treaty (NPT) obligations.
- July 31 - First UN Security Council Resolution (UNSCR 1696): The UN Security Council passed Resolution 1969, legally demanding Iran suspend Uranium enrichment within one month. Iran refused, claiming its program was for peaceful purposes. August 27 - Women’s Rights Activism Emerges: Launch of the “One Million Signatures Campaign” in Tehran, is a campaign ran by women in Iran to collect one million signatures in support of changing discriminatory laws against women in their country. The campaign aims to promote the identification of women needs and priorities and the promotion of collaboration and cooperation for social change.
- October 2006 - Escalation of International Legal Pressure: EU and U.S. imposed unilateral sanctions targeting Iran’s banking and energy sectors.
- December 23 - UN Security Council Resolution 1737: The UN Security Council adopted Resolution 1737, imposing formal sanctions on Iran for refusing to halt uranium enrichment

== Major religious holidays ==
- March 21 – Iranian New Year's Day (Norouz)

== Notable deaths ==
- May 4 – Hossein Kasbian, 73, Iranian film actor.
- May 14 – Reza Hassanzadeh, 33, Iranian professional soccer player with Teraktor Sazi F.C., injuries from car accident.
- July 30 – Akbar Mohammadi, 34, Iranian student dissident, heart attack following a hunger strike and torture.
- November 3 – Fereydoun Hoveyda, 82, Syrian-born Iranian ambassador to the United Nations (1971–1979), cancer.
- November 24 – Dr Mostafa Mesbahzadeh, considered as the Father of Iranian Modern Journalism
- November 26 – Babak Bayat, Iranian composer
- December 28 – Jamal Karimi-Rad, 50, Iranian Minister of Justice, car accident.
