= 2000 in Iran =

- Decades: 1980s; 1990s; 2000s; 2010s; 2020s
- See also: Other events of 2000; Years in Iran

The following lists events that happened during 2000 in Iran.

== Incumbents ==
- Supreme Leader: Ali Khamenei
- President: Mohammad Khatami
- Vice President: Hassan Habibi
- Chief Justice: Mahmoud Hashemi Shahroudi

== Events ==
- Iranian legislative election, 2000.

== Deaths ==
- June 5 – Houshang Golshiri, 62, Iranian fiction writer
- October 24 – Fereydoon Moshiri, 73, Iranian poet.

== See also ==
- Years in Iran
