= 1999 in Iran =

- Decades: 1970s; 1980s; 1990s; 2000s; 2010s
- See also: Other events of 1999; Years in Iran

Events from the year 1999 in Iran.

== Incumbents ==
- Supreme Leader: Ali Khamenei
- President: Mohammad Khatami
- Vice President: Hassan Habibi
- Chief Justice: Mohammad Yazdii (until 30 June), Mahmoud Hashemi Shahroudi (starting 30 June)

== Events ==
- 1999–2000 Iran Football's 2nd Division.

== Establishments ==
- Moderation and Development Party.

== Births ==
- 21 September - Mahsa Amini

== Deaths ==
- 13 November - Ibrahim al-Musawi al-Zanjani, Islamic scholar and writer.

== See also ==
- Years in Iraq
- Years in Afghanistan
