= 2007 in Iran =

- Decades: 1980s; 1990s; 2000s; 2010s; 2020s
- See also: Other events of 2007; Years in Iran

Events from the year 2007 in Iran.

== Incumbents ==
- Supreme Leader: Ali Khamenei
- President: Mahmoud Ahmadinejad
- Vice President: Parviz Davoodi
- Chief Justice: Mahmoud Hashemi Shahroudi

== Deaths ==
- 12 June – Mahdi Ghalibafian, civil engineer and university professor
- 29 November – Jaleh Esfahani, 86, poet.

== See also ==
- Years in Iraq
- Years in Afghanistan
