= 2004 in Iran =

- Decades: 1980s; 1990s; 2000s; 2010s; 2020s
- See also: Other events of 2004; Years in Iran

Events in the year 2004 in Iran.

== Incumbents ==
- Supreme Leader: Ali Khamenei
- President: Mohammad Khatami
- Vice President: Mohammad Reza Aref
- Chief Justice: Mahmoud Hashemi Shahroudi

== Events ==
- Since 2004 until 2005 – Canada evokes its ambassador to Iran and in 2005 restates that until Iran has the same opinion to a global inquiry into Zahra Kazemi’s death, Canada will not restart political relations with Iran.
- February 18 – A train carrying a convoy of petrol, fertilizer, and sulfur derails and explodes in Nishapur, Iran, killing 300 people.
- February 20 – Conservatives win a majority in the 2004 Iranian legislative election.
- May 3 – PAS Tehran F.C. become 2003–2004 Iranian Premier Soccer League Champions.
- June 24 - A petrol truck loses control and collides with a bus at a police checkpoint in Nosratabad, killing 90 and injuring an additional 114.
- July 20
  - Ehsan Haddadi wins gold with a 62.14m discus throw.
  - Iran finishes 14th at IAAF World Junior Track-and-Field Championships.
- 2004: Iran's nuclear program faced increasing international scrutiny, with the International Atomic Energy Agency (IAEA)reporting concerns about Iran's nuclear activities. This led to heightened diplomatic tensions with Western countries and discussions about potential nuclear proliferation

== Births ==
- January 31 – Amir Ebrahimzadeh, football player.

== Notable deaths ==
- April 30 – Kioumars Saberi Foumani, 62, also known as "Gol-Agha", Iranian satirist
