= 2002 in Iran =

- Decades: 1980s; 1990s; 2000s; 2010s; 2020s
- See also: Other events of 2002; Years in Iran

Events from the year 2002 in Iran.

== Incumbents ==
- Supreme Leader: Ali Khamenei
- President: Mohammad Khatami
- Vice President: Mohammad-Reza Aref
- Chief Justice: Mahmoud Hashemi Shahroudi

== Events ==
- 12 February – Iran Air Tours Flight 956 crashes in Tehran.
- 22 June – The 6.3 M_{w} Bou'in-Zahra earthquake shook northwestern Iran with a maximum Mercalli intensity of VIII (Severe). Two hundred and sixty-one people were killed and 1,500 were injured.
- Creation of Iran’s primary nuclear reactor in Bushehr gets under way with the assist of Russian engineers.

== Establishments ==
- Parsian Bank.

== Births ==
- Yasin Salmani

== Notable deaths ==
- October 4 – Ahmad Mahmoud, 71, Iranian novelist.

== See also ==
- Years in Iraq
- Years in Afghanistan
