= 2001 in Iran =

- Decades: 1980s; 1990s; 2000s; 2010s; 2020s
- See also: Other events of 2001; Years in Iran

Events from the year 2001 in Iran.

== Incumbents ==
- Supreme Leader: Ali Khamenei
- President: Mohammad Khatami
- Vice President: Hassan Habibi (until September 11), Mohammad-Reza Aref (starting September 11)
- Chief Justice: Mahmoud Hashemi Shahroudi

== Events ==
- June 8 – Mohammad Khatami is re-elected president for a next term, garnering over 75% of the vote.

== See also ==
- Years in Iraq
- Years in Afghanistan
