= 2005 in Iran =

- Decades: 1980s; 1990s; 2000s; 2010s; 2020s
- See also: Other events of 2005; Years in Iran

The following lists events that happened during 2005 in the Islamic Republic of Iran.

== Incumbents ==
- Supreme Leader: Ali Khamenei
- President: Mohammad Khatami (until August 3), Mahmoud Ahmadinejad (starting August 3)
- Vice President: Mohammad-Reza Aref (until September 11), Parviz Davoodi (starting September 11)
- Chief Justice: Mahmoud Hashemi Shahroudi

== Events ==
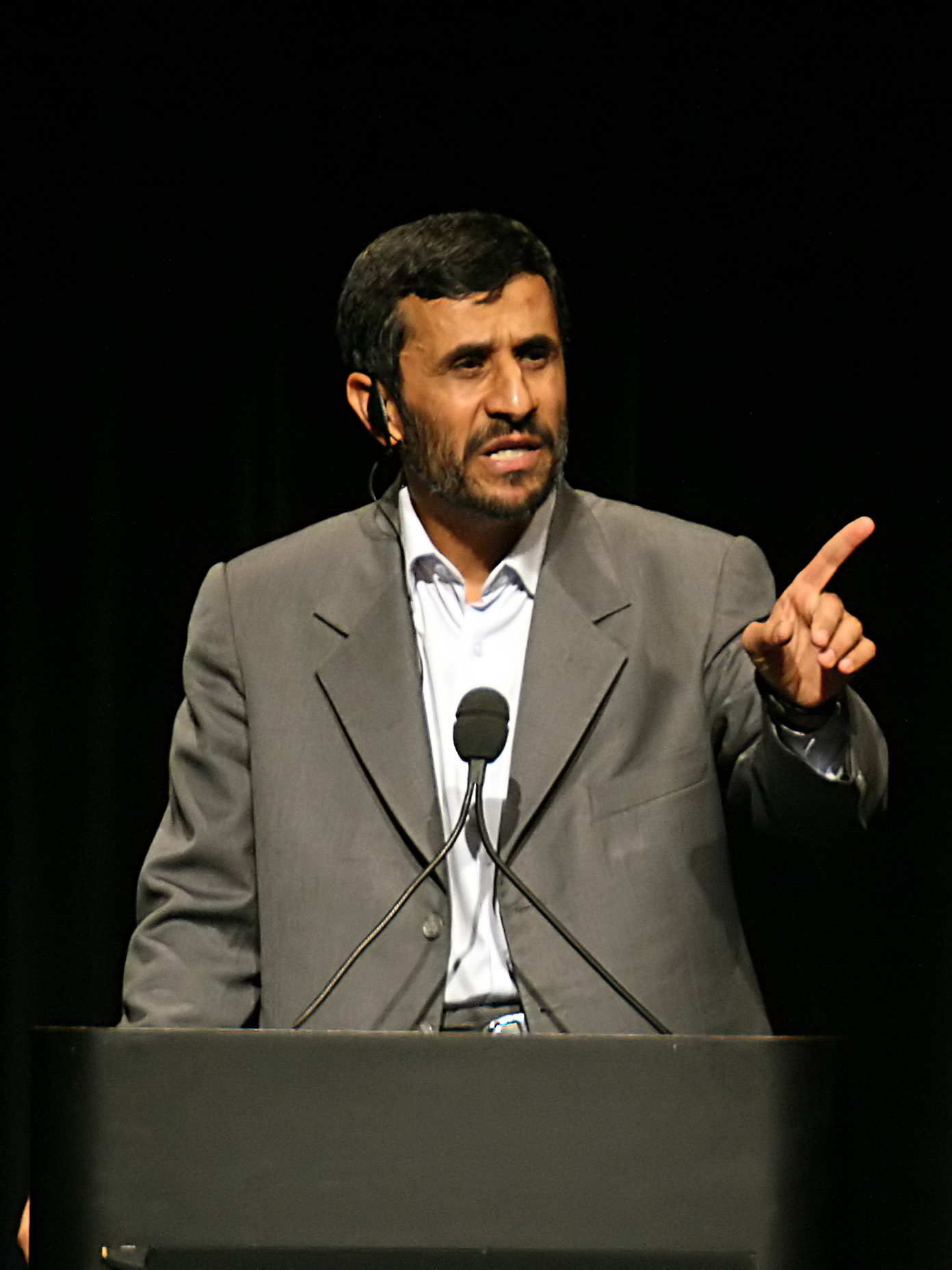
Mahmoud Ahmadinejad takes office as the 6th President of Iran

- Since 2004 until 2005 – Canada evokes its ambassador to Iran and in 2005 restates that until Iran has the same opinion to a global inquiry into Zahra Kazemi’s death, Canada will not restart political relations with Iran.
- February 14 – Around 59 people were killed and 200 injured in a fire at a mosque in Tehran, Iran.
- February 22 – The 6.4 M_{w} Zarand earthquake shakes the Kerman province with a maximum Mercalli intensity of VIII (Severe), killing 612 and injuring 1,411.
- April 18 – Five people die in ethnic clashes in Iran's south-west Khuzestan province.
- August 3 – Mahmoud Ahmadinejad takes office as the 6th President of Iran.
- October 26 – Iranian president Mahmoud Ahmadinejad calls for Israel to be "wiped off the map" at "World Without Zionism" conference in Tehran, Iran, and condemns peace process. MEMRI translated Ahmadinejad's words differently: "Imam [Khomeini] said: 'This regime that is occupying Qods [Jerusalem] must be eliminated from the pages of history.' This sentence is very wise. The issue of Palestine is not an issue on which we can compromise." (MEMRI Special Dispatch Series – No. 1013).
- December 6 – An Iranian C-130 Hercules airplane crashes into a ten-story building in a civilian area of Tehran, the capital of Iran, killing all 94 people aboard and 34 residents of the building – a total of 128 people.

== Notable deaths ==
- April 12 – Shahrokh Meskoob, 81, Iranian Man of letters, writer, translator, scholar and university professor.
- May 18 – Denis Wright, 94, British diplomat. A long-serving ambassador to Iran. He was a contributor to the Encyclopaedia Iranica.
- June 2 – Mohammad Derakhshesh, 90, essayist, minister of education in Ali Amini’s Cabinet editor of Mehregān, an anti-Islamic Republic of Iran journal.
- August 2 – Hassan Moghaddas, 42, Iranian judge in the case of Akbar Ganji and high-profile cases; assassinated by unknown motorbike assailant.
- October 24 – Mokarrameh Ghanbari, 77, Iranian painter.
- July 9 – Karim Emami, 75, Iranian translator, editor, lexicographer, and literary critic.
