= 2003 in Iran =

- Decades: 1980s; 1990s; 2000s; 2010s; 2020s
- See also: Other events of 2003; Years in Iran

Events in the year 2003 in the Islamic Republic of Iran.

== Incumbents ==
- Supreme Leader: Ali Khamenei
- President: Mohammad Khatami
- Vice President: Mohammad-Reza Aref
- Chief Justice: Mahmoud Hashemi Shahroudi

== Events ==
- October 21 - Iran agrees to suspend processing and enriching uranium and allow unannounced inspections by the IAEA.
- November 12 - The IAEA finds no evidence of a nuclear program but expresses concern about plutonium production.
- December 26 – The 6.6 M_{w} Bam earthquake shook southeastern Iran with a maximum Mercalli intensity of IX (Violent), leaving more than 26,000 dead and 30,000 injured.

== Notable births ==
- Yasha Asley

== Notable deaths ==
- July 8 – Ladan and Laleh Bijani, Iranian conjoined twins
- September 6 – Mohammad Oraz, Iranian mountain climber, Mount Everest summiteer, died while climbing Gasherbrum I.
- July 11 – Zahra Kazemi, Iranian-Canadian freelance photographer murdered by the Prosecutor Saeed Mortazavi. (b. 1949)
