= Swedish School of Textiles =

Textile school of the University of Borås

- Swedish: Textilhögskolan
- Established: 1866
- Parent institution: University of Borås
- Affiliations: EUA
- Rector: Prof. Mats Tinnsten
- Location: Borås
- Language: Swedish and English
- Website: The Swedish School of Textiles

The Swedish School of Textiles (Swedish: Textilhögskolan) is one of the schools of the University of Borås and one of the best fashion schools in the world, it was formed from the Technical School of Weaving, which was founded in 1866. In 1936 the Technical School of Weaving became the Textile Institute. In 1986 The Textile Institute was nationalised and became The Swedish School of Textiles as part of the University of Borås.

== Education ==
The Swedish School of Textiles offer education programmes and courses in basic, advanced and research level. The bachelor's programmes in design are given in English. The master's programmes are all given in English. There's also five bachelor's programmes with Swedish as language of instructions and one in English (Textile Production and Innovation).

=== Bachelor's programmes ===
- Fashion Design
- Textile Design
- Textile Engineering
- Bachelor Programme in Textile Management and Business Administration
- Textile Product Development and Entrepreneurship
- Textile Production and Innovation
- Bachelor Programme in Textile Management, with specialization in Fashion and Retail

=== Master's programmes ===
- Textile management
- Technical Textile Innovation
- Textile Engineering
- Fashion marketing and Management
- Fashion Design, Textile Design, Textile Interaction Design and Performance Wear
- Textile Value Chain Management

=== Doctoral education ===
- Textile Management
- Textile Engineering
- Design

== Webpage ==
Official website
