= Tehran Has No More Pomegranates! =

- Directed by: Massoud Bakhshi
- Written by: Massoud Bakhshi
- Produced by: Massoud Bakhshi
- Release date: 2006
- Country: Iran

Tehran Has No More Pomegranates! (Persian: تهران انار ندارد) is a 2006 musical-comedy Iranian Crystal Simorgh award-winning film produced, directed and written by Massoud Bakhshi.

== Title ==
The film starts with a written text chosen from an old Persian book named Asar-al-Bilad describing Tehran in the 13th century.

- Tehran is a large village near the city of Rey, full of gardens and fruit trees. Its inhabitants live in anthill-like underground holes. The village's several districts are constantly at war. Tehranis’ main occupations are theft and crime, though the king pretends they are subject to him. They grow gorgeous fruits, notably a lush pomegranate, which is found only in Tehran.

- Asar-al-Bilad, 1241
