= Parvin Dowlatabadi =

Iranian poet

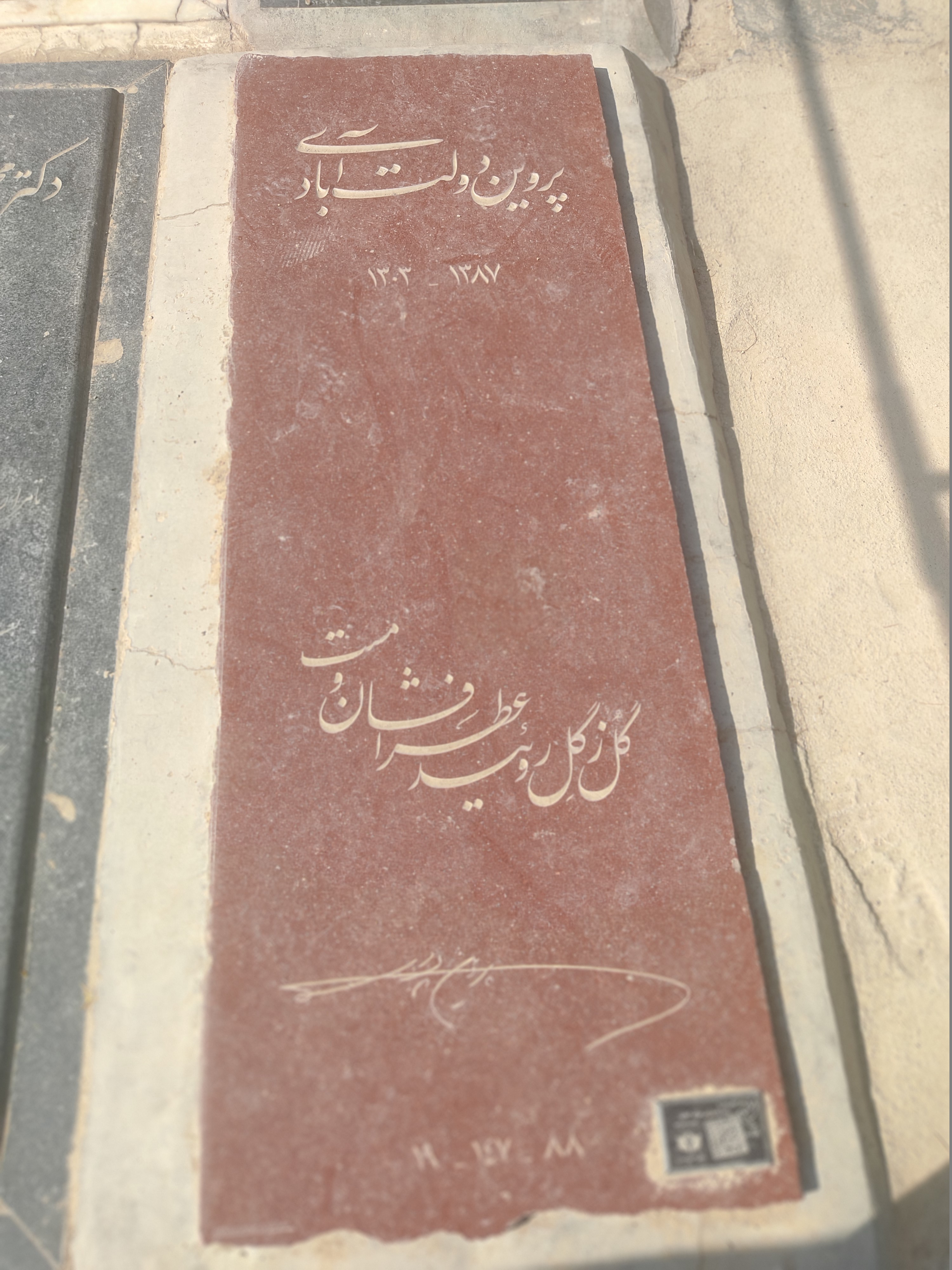
Dowlatabadi’s grave in 2023

Parvin Dowlatabadi (Persian: پروین دولت آبادی) born 1924-April 15, 2008 was an Iranian children's author and poet.

Studying interior photography in the United Kingdom, she was one of the founders of the Children's Book Council of Iran. She had written 20 books for children, including Sparrow and Toad, A Glance at Children’s Literature, The Wooden Horse! (Children's Poetry), and One Actor.

She died on April 15, 2008, aged 84, of a heart attack in Tehran.
