= Mehdi Sahabi =

- مهدی سحابی
- Born: February 1944; Qazvin, Iran
- Died: November 9, 2009 (aged 66); Paris, France
- Occupations: translator, painter, and author
- Writing career
- Language: Persian

Mehdi Sahabi (Persian: مهدی سحابی; February 1944 in Qazvin, Iran – November 9, 2009 in Paris, France) was an Iranian intellectual, translator, painter, and writer. Born in the provincial Iranian capitol of Qazvin in 1944, Sahabi translated novels originally in English, French, and Italian into Persian. He left his studies at the Faculty of Fine Arts of Tehran University and Rome University of Fine Arts unfinished.

His translation of Marcel Proust's In Search of Lost Time, which he spent 11 years on, is considered his finest. He also translated Gustave Flaubert's Madame Bovary and Sentimental Education, Charles Dickens' David Copperfield, All Men are Mortal by Simone de Beauvoir, Stendhal's The Red and the Black, The Baron in the Trees by Italo Calvino and Louis-Ferdinand Céline's Death on Credit.

Sahabi was awarded Iran's Book of the Year award, after which no translator won for 18 years. He died in Paris of a heart attack on November 9, 2009. His funeral took place in Tehran.
