= Ta'zir imprisonment =

Ta'zir imprisonment is a type of imprisonment that is written and executed, differing from Hadd imprisonment (divine limits prescribed by Islamic law). It is under the jurisdiction of the ruler. Sometimes, Ta'zir imprisonment is contrasted with suspended imprisonment, which is not enforced on the accused. Ta'zir imprisonment, however, is implemented and is considered a form of discipline left to the discretion of the ruler according to Islamic law and Article 16 of the Penal Code of the Islamic Republic of Iran.

This type of imprisonment is applied for crimes rooted in Islamic principles and considered Haram (forbidden acts) but without a specific punishment prescribed in Islamic law. Contrary to popular belief, Ta'zir imprisonments cannot be traded or "sold."

- Ta'zir refers to punishments that are not classified as Hudud, Qisas, or Diyya. These are determined and enforced by law for committing religiously forbidden acts or violating governmental regulations. The type, amount, implementation method, and other provisions such as mitigation, suspension, or abatement are determined by law.

== Crimes leading to Ta'zir punishment ==
The scope of crimes punishable under Ta'zir laws is broad. Below are some examples of offenses that may result in Ta'zir imprisonment:

1. Underpricing or overpricing
2. Currency smuggling
3. Fraud
4. Forgery
5. Hoarding
6. Tax evasion

== Conditions for converting Ta'zir imprisonment to suspension ==
According to Article 46 of the Penal Code, Ta'zir imprisonment can be converted into suspended imprisonment under certain conditions. Note that suspension only applies to Ta'zir sentences of degrees 3 to 8. These conditions are as follows:

1. For Ta'zir crimes of degrees 3 to 8, if the conditions for postponement of the sentence are met, the court may suspend the execution of all or part of the sentence for 1 to 5 years.
2. After serving one-third of the sentence, the convict can request suspension of imprisonment through the prosecutor or judge if the conditions for suspension are met.
