= United For Iran =

Organization dedicated to human rights and civil liberties in Iran

United for Iran
- Official logo with a black background, reading the organization's name in English and Persian.
- Formation: 2009
- Headquarters: San Francisco Bay Area, U.S.
- Website: united4iran.org

United For Iran is an independent nonprofit organization based in the San Francisco Bay Area that advocates for an end to human rights violations in Iran, as well as democratic reform and the advancement of civil liberties within the country. The organization works to raise awareness about such human rights abuses and mobilizes pressure on the Iranian government to uphold the principles outlined in the Universal Declaration of Human Rights. United For Iran undertakes programs and campaigns that aim to advance accountability for violations against Iranian citizens and increase the cost for human rights abuses. They were formed in 2009 during the 2009–2010 Iranian election protests.

Among its policy agenda, United For Iran calls on the Iranian government to:

- Release political prisoners.
- End all restrictions that prevent citizens from accessing information and the Internet freely.
- Reform its laws and practices to adhere to international standards established in the Universal Declaration of Human Rights, including the promotion of gender equality; respect for freedom of assembly, freedom of expression, and freedom of religion; and ensuring freedom from torture, arbitrary detention, and extrajudicial execution.
- Institute electoral and democratic reforms and hold genuine democratic elections open to international electoral observation.
- Establish a moratorium on the death penalty until due process rights are guaranteed and with a view toward joining the global movement toward abolition.

To advance this agenda, United For Iran will pursue the following objectives: contribute to NGO coalition-building and collaboration among organizations that work on human rights promotion in Iran; encourage cooperation by the Iranian government with the international human rights system; and exert international pressure on the Iranian government to carry about the above human rights objectives.

The group organized the July 25, 2009, Global Day of Action for Iran. With the support of major human rights organizations and several Nobel Peace Prize winners, including Desmund Tutu, Shirin Ebadi, and Jody Williams, the impetus for the Global Day of Action spread around the world, gathering momentum as a grassroots movement in over 110 cities. Since its first Global Day of Action, United4Iran has coordinated several more international days of action, including one for International Human Rights Day (2009), two to mark the anniversaries of Iran's disputed 2009 election (2010 and 2011), and one for Iran's Student Day (2010).

United4Iran has partnered with several prominent human rights organizations, activists, and NGOs, including:

- ARTICLE 19
- Amnesty International
- Shirin Ebadi, 2003 Nobel Peace Laureate
- Exiled Writers Ink
- FIDH
- Front Line (NGO)
- Human Rights Watch
- International Campaign for Human Rights in Iran
- International PEN
- Iranian League for Defense of Human Rights (LDDHI)
- Nobel Women's Initiative
- PeaceJam
- Physicians for Human Rights (PHR)
- Reporters without Borders
