= Baghi (Islam) =

Baghi (Arabic: بغيُ) refers to transgression and infringement on the rights of others, rebellion, or armed uprising against a legitimate Imam or Islamic ruler. A person who commits baghi is also called "baghi." This concept is addressed in the Islamic Penal Code of Iran.

According to the Islamic Penal Code of the Islamic Republic of Iran, the crime of baghi is defined as an armed uprising, carried out by a group, against the foundations and principles of the Islamic Republic of Iran.

The crime of baghi has two forms: the first involves armed groups using weapons during their rebellion, while the second involves groups merely possessing weapons to create fear and intimidation without actually using them.

According to the Islamic Penal Code, those who engage in armed rebellion and use their weapons against the Islamic Republic of Iran are sentenced to execution.

== History ==
Muhammad, the Prophet of Islam, first used the term to describe the killers of Ammar ibn Yasir, predicting that "a rebellious group" would kill him. Eventually, Ammar was killed by the army of Mu'awiya ibn Abi Sufyan during the Battle of Siffin. In the Quran, the root of this term appears in verse 9 of Surah Al-Hujurat: "And if two groups of the believers fight, make peace between them. But if one of them oppresses the other, then fight against the one that oppresses until it returns to the ordinance of Allah. If it returns, then reconcile between them with justice and act justly. Indeed, Allah loves those who act justly." Muhammad Husayn Tabatabai interprets this verse to mean: "If one group of Muslims transgresses against the other without right, they must be fought until they submit to Allah's command and comply with His ordinances."

The First Fitna was the earliest instance of conflict between Muslim factions. Ali's governance during this period laid the groundwork for developing rulings related to dealing with rebels within the Muslim community, forming the basis of "Ahkam al-Bughat" in response to questions raised by Abbasid rulers, especially Harun al-Rashid. During the Battle of the Camel, Ali ordered that the wounded and captives not be killed, those who abandoned their weapons not be pursued, and that no harm come to women or children. Only the enemy's arms and military equipment were to be confiscated as booty, and the property of the deceased was to be returned to their rightful heirs.

== Etymology and terminology ==
In Al-Mufradat fi Gharib al-Quran, the term "baghi" is defined as transgression or exceeding the limits of moderation, as well as arrogance. According to Al-Raghib al-Isfahani, baghi is of two types: a praiseworthy one, which involves exceeding justice to perform acts of kindness or moving from obligatory duties to recommended acts, and a reprehensible one, which involves transitioning from truth to falsehood or doubt. Muhammad Husayn Tabatabai states in Tafsir al-Mizan that "the term 'baghi' … refers to oppression and unjust transgression without right."

== In jurisprudence ==
In Islamic jurisprudence, various definitions have been provided for baghi, all of which converge on the concept of "armed rebellion against an Imam or Islamic ruler." Some Twelver Shia jurists restrict baghi to rebellion against an infallible Imam, but the majority include opposition to the Imam's deputy. Ja'far Kashif al-Ghita states: "Anyone who rebels against the infallible Imam or his deputy, disobeys his command, fails to comply with his prohibitions, or opposes him by withholding zakat, khums, or other religious dues is considered a baghi."

=== Difference with the Kharijites ===
According to Abdul Karim bin Abdullah Al-Khudair, the Khawarij are a sect that emerged during the time of Ali ibn Abi Talib, who declare those who commit major sins as unbelievers and those in authority as unbelievers, based on this opinion, the disagreement over declaring them unbelievers is well known among scholars; and as for baghi, they are not considered unbelievers, but rather they rebel against the leaders based on an interpretation that they consider permissible; thus, they are not considered unbelievers by consensus, but they must be fought and restrained until they return, when they return, when they return, then it is obligatory to refrain from fighting them.

== In Iranian law ==
In the Islamic Penal Code of Iran (2013), armed rebellion against the government and the foundations of the Islamic Republic of Iran is categorized as a hudud offense under the title of "baghi." Articles 287 and 288 of the Code prescribe execution or, under specific conditions, ta'zir imprisonment.

== See also ==
- Hajjaj ibn Yusuf
