= University of Borås =

Swedish university college

- Högskolan i Borås
- Type: public
- Established: 1977; 49 years ago
- Affiliations: EUA
- Vice-Chancellor: Mats Tinnsten
- Academic staff: 481 (47 professors, 2025)
- Total staff: 822 (2025), 481 lecturers (61 % PhD)
- Students: 19 500 (Annual report 2025)
- Doctoral students: 75 (2025)
- Location: Borås, Sweden
- Website: hb.se/en

The University of Borås (UB), or Högskolan i Borås, is a Swedish university college in the city of Borås. As of 2025 it has around 19,500 students and 822 staff. The Swedish School of Library and Information Science and Swedish School of Textiles are part of the university. Along with Borås' reputation as a textile city, the university is known for its fashion and management programs, as being some of the best in the world.

== Description ==
=== Faculties and location ===
The University of Borås is a located in the centre of the city. UB has 19,500 students and 822 employees.

The university is organised within four faculties: Faculty of Textiles, Engineering and Business, Faculty of Caring Science, Work Life and Social Welfare, Faculty of Librarianship, Information, Education and IT and Faculty of Police Work.

The university offers courses and study programmes within the areas of: Library and Information Science (at the Swedish School of Library and Information Science), Business and Informatics, Fashion and Textile Studies, Behavioural and Education Sciences, Engineering and Health Sciences, Police Work.

Research is organised in six areas: Business and IT, The Human Perspective in Care, Library and Information Science, Swedish Centre for Resource Recovery, Educational Work and Textiles and Fashion (design and general). The university is entitled to award doctoral degrees within four of these areas: Library and Information Science, Resource Recovery, The Human Perspective in Care and Textiles and Fashion (design and general).

The University of Borås is a member of the European University Association, EUA, which represents and supports higher education institutions in 46 countries.

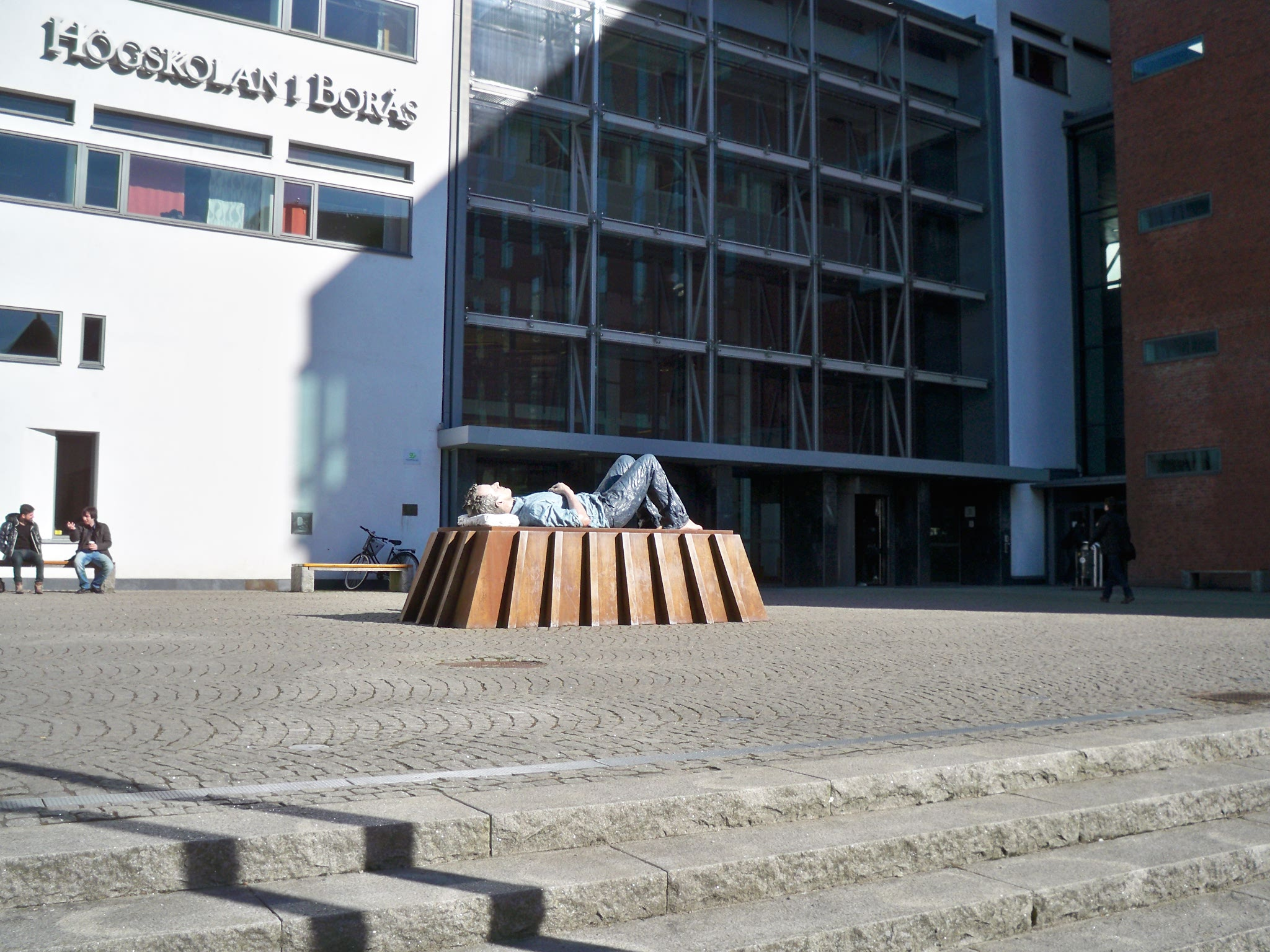
The sculpture Catafalque (2003) by Sean Henry outside the university library building.

Organised under the University of Borås is also Science Park Borås, which is a national leader in sustainability and consumption.

== History ==
The University of Borås was founded through the Swedish Higher Education reform of 1977. At that time, two educational programmes were already in place: the preschool seminar (founded in 1966) and the Librarian College (established 1972).

=== Timeline ===
- 1866 – Technical School of Weaving (Väfskolan) is founded
- 1936 – Technical School of Weaving becomes the Textile Institute
- 1940 – West Sweden's College of Nursing is formed
- 1966 – The Preschool Teacher Seminary (Förskollärarseminariet) is founded in Borås
- 1970 – University courses from Gothenburg University are relocated to Borås
- 1972 – The Swedish School of Library and Information Science (Bibliotekshögskolan) is established in Borås
- 1977 – University of Borås is founded.
- 1980 – Business and IT courses begin
- 1982 – The Textile Institute is nationalised and becomes The Swedish School of Textiles
- 1989 – Engineering programme begins
- 1991 – The municipal hand weaving training becomes a part of the university
- 1995 – The university is authorised to confer one-year master's degrees
- 1996 – Professorship in Library and Information Science is established
- 1999 – The regional College of Nursing (Vårdhögskolan) becomes a school at the University of Borås
- 2000 – First Professorial Inauguration
- 2004 – The university's new library opens
- 2007 – The university is authorised to provide master-level education
- 2010 – The university is authorised to provide research-level education in Library and Information Science, Resource Recovery and Textiles and Fashion (design and general)
- 2011 – The university is certified to ISO 14001
- 2013 – The Swedish School of Textiles moves to the new Textile Fashion Centre
- 2014 – The first Conferment of Doctoral Degrees
- 2014 – Reorganization consisting of a change from six departments (schools) to three faculties: Faculty of Textiles, Engineering and Business, Faculty of Caring Science, Work Life and Social Welfare and Faculty of Librarianship, Information, Education and IT
- 2015 – The university has a full range of Master's programmes
- 2016 – The university is authorised to provide research-level education in The Human Perspective in Care
- 2021 – The university establishes the Faculty of Police Work

== Faculties ==
- Faculty of Textiles, Engineering and Business
- Faculty of Caring Science, Work Life and Social Welfare
- Faculty of Librarianship, Information, Education and IT
- Faculty of Police Work

=== Vice-Chancellor ===
- Ulf Dittmer (1977–1977)
- Nils-Bertil Faxén (1977–1989)
- Anders Fransson (1989–2001)
- Said Irandoust (2001–2005)
- Lena Nordholm (2006–2011)
- Björn Brorström (2011–2018)
- Mats Tinnsten (2019–2026)
- Anna Cregård (2026–)

== Notable alumni ==
- Zahra Tabari, Iranian human rights activist.

== See also ==
- List of colleges and universities in Sweden
