= Khalil Esfandiary-Bakhtiary =

Iranian politician and diplomat (1901–1983)

- خلیل اسفندیاری بختیاری
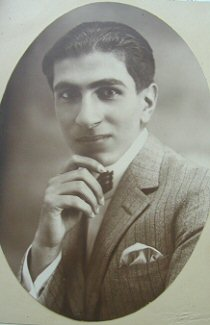

Iranian Ambassador to West Germany
- In office 1952–1961
- Monarch: Mohammad Reza Shah
- Prime Minister: Mohammad Mosaddegh; Fazlollah Zahedi; Hossein Ala'; Manouchehr Eghbal; Jafar Sharif-Emami
- Preceded by: Abdullah Entezam
- Succeeded by: Amir Khosrow Afshar

Personal details
- Born: 3 April 1901 Izeh, Sublime State of Iran
- Died: 16 January 1983 (aged 81) Munich, West Germany
- Party: Independent
- Spouse: Eva Karl (1924–1983, his death)
- Children: Soraya; Bijan
- Parent(s): Esfandiar Khan (Sardar Asad); Bibi Maryam
- Relatives: Ali-Qoli Khan Bakhtiari (uncle); Najaf-Qoli Khan Bakhtiari (uncle); Bibi Maryam Bakhtiari (aunt)

Khalil Esfandiary-Bakhtiary (Note: also rendered Khalil Esfandiari Bakhtiari) (Persian: خلیل اسفندیاری بختیاری; 3 April 1901 – 19 January 1983), was an Iranian politician and diplomat who served as Iran's Ambassador to West Germany from 1952 to 1961. He was the father of Soraya Esfandiary-Bakhtiary, the second wife of Mohammad Reza Pahlavi, the last Shah of Iran. He was also a Bakhtiari nobleman, belonging to the noble class of Iran.

== Early life ==
Khalil Esfandiari Bakhtiari was the fourth child of Esfandiar Khan and Maryam Esfandiari Bakhtiari, who was born on 3 April 1901. His father was Esfandiar Khan Sardar Asad, from Ilkhanan named Bakhtiari. His uncle Ali Qoli Khan, Sardar Asad, the conqueror of Tehran during the constitutional revolution, and his other uncle Najaf Qoli Khan, nicknamed Samsam al-Saltaneh; He was the 2nd Prime Minister of Iran during the Qajar era. Esfandiari Bakhtiari grew up in a powerful and political family and left for Berlin, Germany in the autumn of 1924 to continue his studies.

== Education ==
Esfandiary Bakhtiari began his studies in law and political economy at the University of Berlin in 1923. While studying in Germany in 1924, he married Eva Karl. Eva was born in 1906 in Saint Petersburg, the capital of the Russian Empire, and returned to Germany with her family before the start of World War I. Khalil held influence among the Bakhtiari tribes, who resided in central and southern Iran.

== Return to Iran ==
After completing his studies, Esfandiary Bakhtiari returned to Iran and spent a short period at his maternal estate in Anzano, located at the foothills of the Zagros Mountains. He then moved to Isfahan, and six years after their marriage, their first child, Soraya, was born. Due to the poor sanitary conditions in Iran and the outbreak of smallpox, they decided to leave the country to avoid the risk of disease, heading to Berlin. Four years later, they returned to Isfahan, where they had a son, whom they named Bijan. In April 1946, the Bakhtiari family emigrated to Switzerland and settled in Zurich. A year later, in 1947, Khalil returned to Iran alone, and over the course of four years, assisted Mohammad Reza Shah in bringing tribal leaders under governmental control.

== Iran's ambassador to Germany ==
After four years, Khalil once again left Iran for Europe. He first went to Switzerland, then, along with his wife and two children, traveled to Germany. On 18 June 1952, following a decree from the Iranian court, he was appointed as the successor to the then-Ambassador of Iran to Germany, Abdollah Entezam-ol-Saltaneh. Khalil Esfandiary Bakhtiari served as Iran's ambassador to Germany for nine years until 1961, when Amir Khosrow Afshar succeeded him. Esfandiary Bakhtiari never returned to Iran and moved to Munich in 1961.

He died in Munich, Germany, in 1983.
