= Minor Tyranny =

Period in Iranian history, 1908–1909

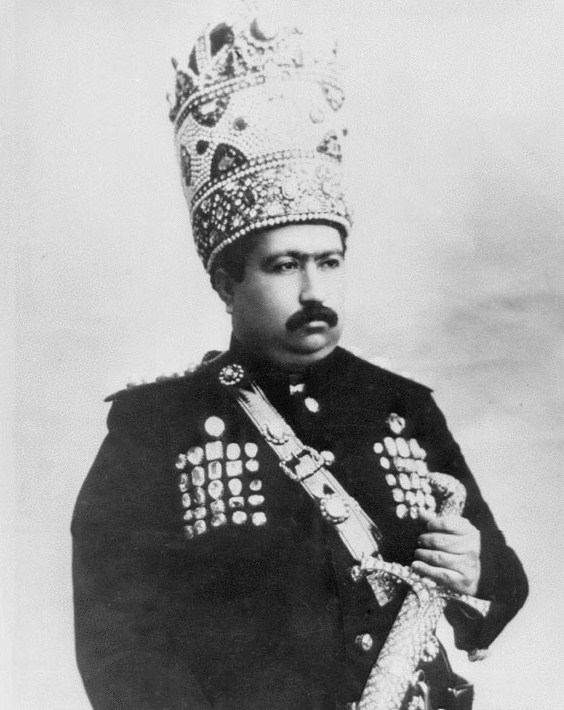
Mohammad Ali Shah Qajar, who ascended the throne in January 1907, was an opponent of the constitutional revolution from its inception.

The Minor Tyranny (Persian: استبداد صغیر) was a roughly one-year-long period in Iranian history lasting from the bombardment of the Iranian parliament by the forces of Mohammad Ali Shah on 23 June 1908 to the capture of Tehran by the revolutionary forces on 13 July 1909. This period was marked by the executions and expulsion of many journalists and constitutionalists as an era of absolutism returned to the country.

== Background ==
Iran has a long history of absolute monarchy. In the late 19th century, the pressure to bring in a constitution and limit the powers of the Shah and the royalty grew, as the administration of the Shah proved weak and inefficient, and in several instances he had granted concessions that the population deemed outrageous. Examples of such concessions were the tobacco concession given to Gerald Talbot which led to the tobacco protest, and the Reuter concession, both of which were received with massive backlash from the people. The Shah lived extravagantly and often pushed the country to the brink of bankruptcy, this resulted in an increase of loans from western powers to cover his expenses, which consequently increased western influence in the country's politics gradually.

After a series of protests and strikes, Mozaffar ad-Din Shah Qajar agreed with the formation of a parliament on 5 August 1906, and the first constitution was signed by the Shah on 30 December 1906, officially restricting his own powers and making the government a constitutional monarchy.

The shah died 5 days after signing the constitution, and his son Mohammad Ali Mirza, an avid opponent of the constitutional movement, was crowned Shah of Iran.

== Friction with the parliament ==
As a way to show his opposition to the constitutional movement, Mohammad Ali Shah did not invite the members of the parliament to his coronation ceremony and encouraged the cabinet ministers to ignore the parliament and its members. After his coronation, he tried to get a note from Mozaffar ad-Din Shah's physician stating the late shah had been too unwell to comprehend what he was signing, but his attempt at this failed. He also ignited several conflicts between the country's ethnic and religious minorities to weaken his opponents and prevent them from allying against him.

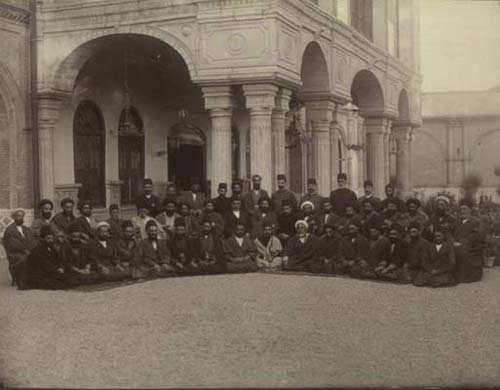
Members of the first Iranian parliament, in front of the parliament building.

From the beginning the parliament had issues with the prime minister and the rest of the government. For example, Mirza Nasrullah Khan Moshir ad-Dowleh who was at the time the prime minister of Iran refused to be present in the parliament and nominating ministers for vote of confidence. At the other hand, the government's proposal to get loans from western countries was rejected by the parliament, which proposed the foundation of a national bank. In early 1907 the Shah reportedly told the British ambassador that the current constitution is not favoured by him, and that the parliament is filled with undisciplined and ignorant people who only think about their personal gain. At the time however, he did not have the financial or the military power to enforce his ideals and remove the parliament.

The Shah later refused to sign the constitutional amendment, which covered parts and issues that were not discussed in the original constitution due to the hastiness of the process of its writing and presenting it to the ill Shah before he died. Some of his major disagreements with the article 8 of the amendment which equaled him with the rest of the people of Iran in front of law, and other parts of the amendment which were inspired by the Belgian constitution and heavily restricted his powers and gave massive powers to the parliament, such as dismissing ministers and controlling the military budget. After protests from people, parliament members and constitutionalists, he was forced to sign the amendment, and even joined Society of Humanity to prove his support for the constitution.

=== Opponents in the court ===
Other than the Shah, many courtiers and princes also felt that the constitutional movement was threatening their power and income, and thus actively opposed it and encouraged the Shah to act against the parliament. Kamran Mirza, the Shah's uncle and father in law, led the politicians left from the Naseri era. Ein ad-Dowleh, Mozaffar ad-Din Shah's grand vizier before the constitutional revolution, was also among the main opponents of the movement. Javad Sa'd al-Dowleh, a member of the parliament who was the minister of trade and an opponent of Joseph Naus before the revolution, also started slowly leaning towards the Shah and the court. Seraya Shapshal, the Shah's Russian language teacher and Vladimir Liakhov, the leader of the Cossack Brigade were also opposed to the revolution.

Many of the local governors also ignored the orders issued by the parliament. Among them were Asef ad-Dowleh in Khorasan, the Qavam family in Shiraz, Shoja Nezam in Marand and Rahimkhan Chalabianloo and his son in Maku.

=== Opponents among the clergy ===
Sheikh Fazlollah Noori, one of the influential clerics of Tehran, considered the constitutional amendment against Islam. Legislation by humans was also considered by him to be against the rules of Islam. He was specially opposed to the principles of freedom (article 8) and equality (article 20) in the amendment. It was at this time that for the first time the necessity of adapting the legislation the parliament passes to the rules of Islam was discussed. A while later an anti constitutional movement headed by Noori started working that was against parliamentarism and was opposed to the constitution and its amendment, specially to articles promoting the equality of religions and empowering secular courthouses, and considered them against Islam. In 1908, Noori who saw himself above both Seyyed Abdollah Behbahani and Mirza Sayyed Mohammad Tabatabai, openly favored the Shah and declared constitutionalist journalists and clerics non Muslims.

=== Anglo-Russian Convention ===
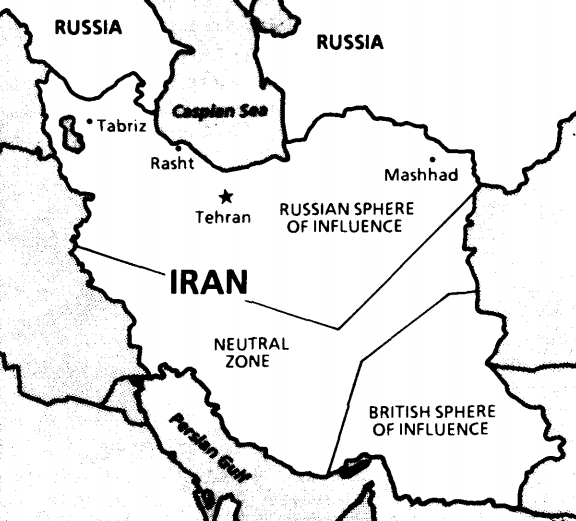
The Anglo-Russian convention divided Iran into three zones and two spheres of influence.

An agreement between the Russian Empire and the British Empire in 1907 divided Iran into 2 spheres of influence each of them for one of the great powers. This was to put aside their differences and conflicts and unite against the German Empire that was becoming threatening. Neither the British or Russian governments approved of the new constitutional political arrangement which was both liberal and unstable, preferring a stable puppet government which allowed foreign concessions and supported their designs in the region. The agreement was done without consent from the Iranian government and outraged the parliament which saw this as against the sovereignty of Iran. It also enabled the Russians to oppose the constitutionalists more freely without concerns from the British who were previously pro constitutionalist.

== Confrontation with the parliament ==
=== Incident in Toopkhaneh square ===
On 13 December 1907 a group of court workers and servants who were outraged by their incomes being cut protested against the parliament first in Tehran's arsenal and then in Abdolhossein mosque. The next day groups of thugs joined them, creating a mass of 700 or 800 people and moved towards Baharestan. According to Sohrab Yazdani, their plan had three stages. First, to attack the parliament with cold weapons, second, to gather a mass of people and court servants to protest in Toopkhaneh square, and third, to have the army join in to not let constitutionalist people to join the fight. However, the parliament guards closed the doors on the sight of incoming attackers and after a few gunshots, the first stage failed and thus the attack group joined the protesters on the square.

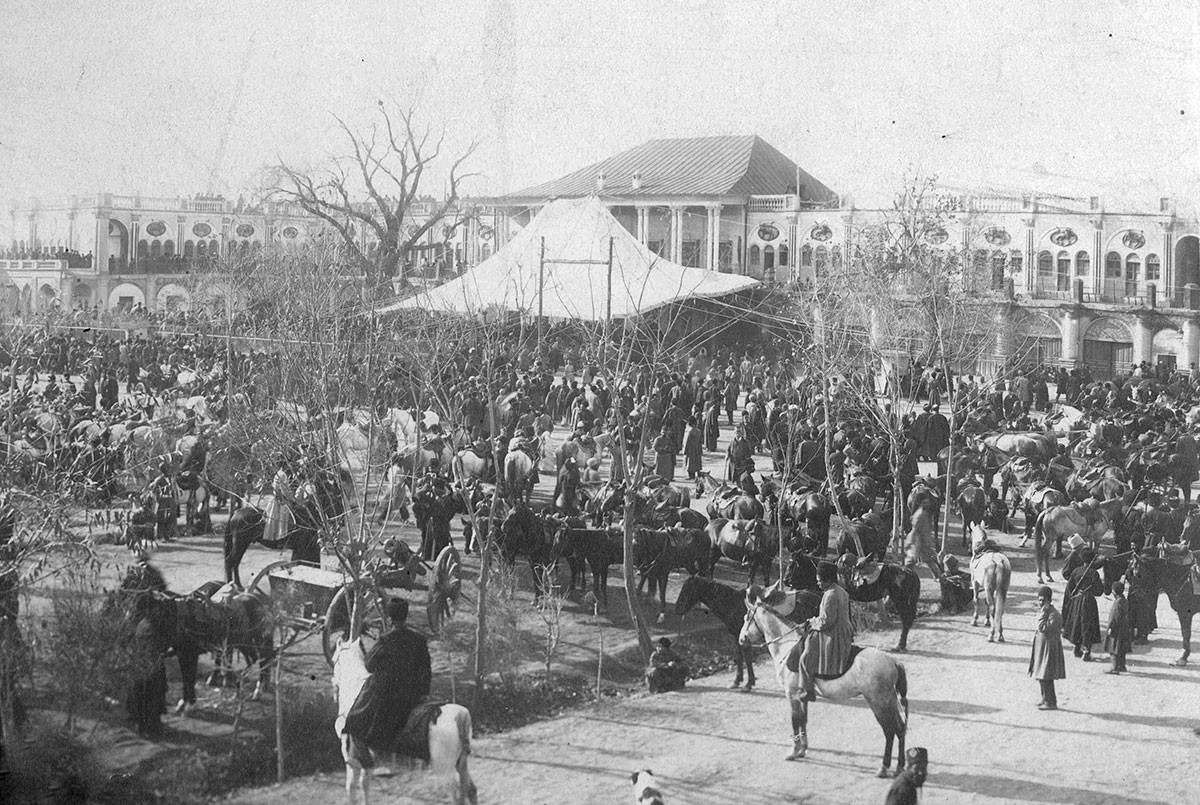
The tent of Sheikh Fazlollah surrounded by his supporters in Toopkhaneh square.

The anti constitution protesters were made up of three groups:

1. Thugs and strongmen from Sangelaj and Chalemeidan led by Sani' Hazrat and Moqtader Nezam.
2. Workers and servants of the royal court.
3. Religious following of Sheikh Fazlollah Noori and other royalist clerics.

In the meantime, the Shah punished many constitutionalists severely. The prime minister, Abolqasem Naser ol-Molk was imprisoned by the order of the Shah and was to be executed but was freed on the requests of the British and moved to Europe after freedom. Ala' ad-Dowleh and Moeen ad-Dowleh were arrested and exiled, and other ministers were dismissed with insults, and as such, the government was nearly dissolved.

The protests lasted 10 days but the anti constitutionalists gradually lost the upper hand. At last, after mediation of some politicians and noblemen, the Shah took an oath on 23 December 1907 to abide by the constitution. The new government that was then formed included both constitutionalist and royalist politicians, Nezam as-Saltaneh became prime minister, and Javad Sa'd al-Dowleh was forced to take refuge in the Dutch embassy.

=== Assassination attempt on the Shah ===
On 29 February 1908, two hand grenades were thrown at the Shah's car in the streets of Tehran near Masoudieh Mansion. Despite several people getting killed, the Shah was unharmed. According to Sohrab Yazdani, the assassination attempt was most probably done by the Social Democratic Party. On the orders of the Shah, some people including Haydar Khan Amo-oghli were arrested and interrogated in the Golestan Palace. Some of the parliament members viewed this order of the Shah as unconstitutional, and blamed the minister of justice, the commander of Nazmiyeh and the judge for accepting the order from the Shah; all this while the Shah was finding his life in danger and viewed the incident as an attempt by his uncle Zell-e Soltan to usurp the throne and would not have accepted parliaments insistence to abide by the constitution.

=== The Shah moves to Baghshah ===
On 4 June 1908 a group of Shah's soldiers shot guns into the air and disturbed the peace, at the same time a group of the Cossack brigade moved to Toopkhaneh square with a cannon, in a way the people thought the Shah is going to attack the parliament. Simultaneously, the Shah who had not left the Golestan palace since the assassination attempt left for Baghshah, a royal residence that at the time was outside Tehran and had strong defensive structures. The Cossack brigade immediately surrounded Baghshah and pointed cannons towards the capital. The Shah announced to the prime minister in a letter that he has left Tehran due to the warmth of the weather. From here the Shah took control over the country and appointed the people he had in mind to vital positions. Vladimir Liakhov was appointed as the military commander in Tehran, Mavid ad-Dowleh was appointed as the governor of Tehran and Amin al-Molk was appointed for Telegraph communications. Later, the Shah ordered Jalal ad-Dowleh, Zell-e Soltan's son, Ala ad-Dowleh and Sardar Masoud who were holding meetings and protests in the house of Azod-ol-Molk to be arrested and exiled. Members of the parliament objected to these actions of the Shah as being unconstitutional.

On 9 June 1908, after it was clear that the Shah intends to attack the parliament, a large group of political associations and their followers gathered in Sepahsalar mosque and surrounded the parliament building to defend it. The Shah considered this a hostile act and demanded them to be disbanded. Despite opposition from Tabatabai and Behbahani, the parliament accepted the Shah's demands at last and the defenders were disbanded temporarily, but from 16 June the parliament supporters returned, as such that 100 people were on guard around the building at nights. However, the guards did not have much equipment and ammo.

On 22 June 1908, the Shah declared martial law in Tehran and other cities. Following this, gatherings in streets, squares and even houses were banned, no one had the right to carry arms and the security forces were allowed to shoot at people if they did not comply. The streets became empty and the parliament was left without support. In another act, the Shah announced via telegraph to other provinces of the country that the parliament is illegal and is against the constitution.

=== Bombardment of the parliament ===
On the morning of 23 June 1908, military forces with cannons started moving towards the parliament building. The main excuse for this action was that a group of the Shah's strongest critics such as Mirza Jahangir Khan Sur Esrafil, Sayyid Jamal al-Din Va'iz, Malek al-Motekallemin, Qazi Ardaghi and Seyyed Mohammad Reza Mosavat had taken refuge in the parliament building. The Shah wanted these people arrested but the parliament had refused. The Shah's forces included the Cossack brigade, Silakhori forces and two other regiments. According to Mamontov, one of Liakhov's men, the attacking forces were between 450 and 500 soldiers with eight cannons. Ahmad Kasravi however, puts the number higher. The attacking forces then bombarded the parliament building, the Sepahsalar mosque and Mozzaffari and Azerbaijan political associations.

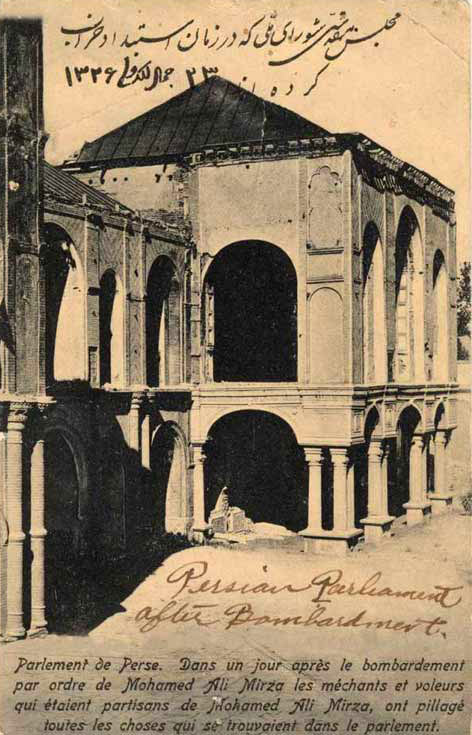
The Parliament building after bombardment.

The parliament's defenders were less than 80 men, who had often not received any military training, had a severe lack of ammunition and avoided shooting towards the Russian troops to not give them any excuse to invade Iran. After they ran out of ammo, they were forced to surrender. In this conflict the government announced that 24 of the attacking forces were killed and some were wounded, and of the defenders of the parliament 300 died. Sohrab Yazdani however, claims the second number to be false, as the number of defenders was much lower.

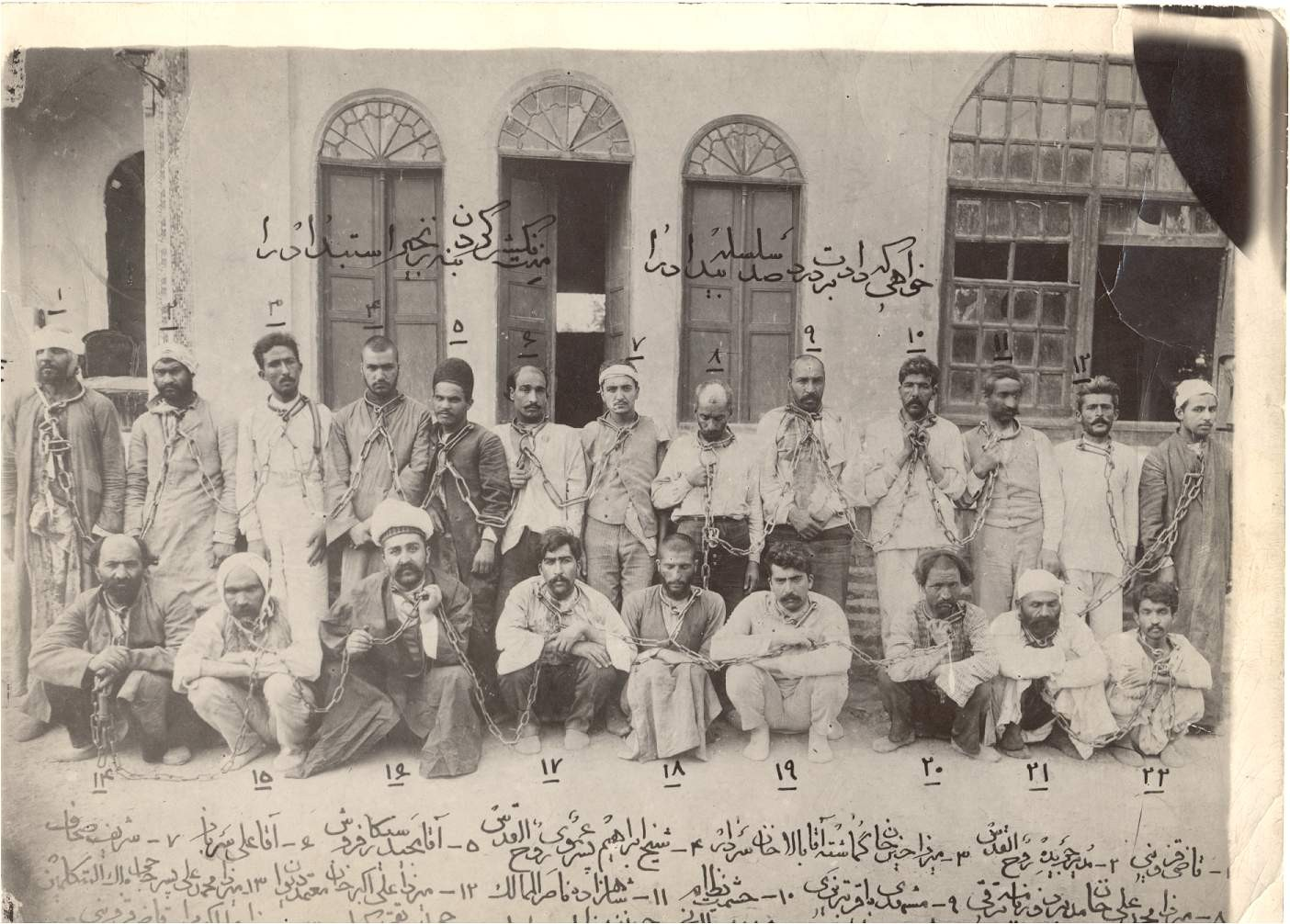
A group of arrested constitutionalists in Baghshah.

After the Shah's victory and dissolution of the parliament, many constitutionalists were arrested by the Shah's forces. Mirza Jahangir Khan, Malek al-Motekallemin, Sayyid Jamal al-Din Va'iz, Mirza Ebrahim Tabrizi, Ahmad Ruholqodos and Qazi Ardaghi were arrested, tortured and killed. In other cities like Ardabil and Anzali, prominent constitutionalists were tortured and killed. Other constitutionalists fled to other countries, took refuge in foreign embassies or went into hiding to be safe from government forces. Newspaper and political association offices were looted and destroyed. The Shah announced that he is loyal the constitution and another parliament would be formed in three months. In a note that was published on 24 June he stated: "to bring peace and order to the people, which is a responsibility God has given to us, we wanted to arrest corrupt people. The parliament refused and supported them, and so we dissolve the parliament from today to three months later. After this time, representatives would be chosen from the lovers of the people and the government, the parliament shall be opened again and will continue legislation".

== Resistance ==
=== In Tabriz ===
Following the bombardment of the parliament on the orders of Mohammad Ali Shah, telegrams were sent to various cities, announcing the dissolving of the parliament, inviting everyone to follow the central government and the Shah. Constitutionalists were swiftly and brutally suppressed, arrested and executed. However, the constitutionalists of Tabriz, led by Sattar Khan and Baqer Khan, refused to submit to the Shah and after initial royalist successes managed to defeat the city's garrison which had tried to suppress them. The Shah, on the other hand, sent a large detachment of troops to Tabriz under the command of Abdul Majid Mirza.

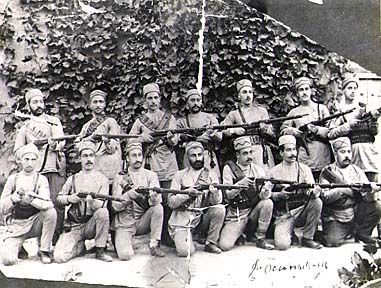
Some of the soldiers of Fowj-e Nejat who were mostly students from the American memorial school.

The Shah's forces besieged the city, not letting food and provisions to reach the people which led to a famine. The people of Tabriz were forced to eat the leaves of desert trees and grass, and many of the residents of Tabriz starved to death. The constitutionalists tried breaking the siege several times. For example, a group of around 150 students named Fowj-e Nejat (Persian: فوج نجات; lit: Salvation Regiment) led by the teacher of the American memorial school, Howard Baskerville, tried breaking through the besieging forces and bring food and supplies from nearby villages, but they were defeated and the American teacher was killed.

The siege ended after 11 months when Russian forces entered the city, using protection of Russian citizens as an excuse, they entered the city with the constitutionalist support. After this the besieging force dispersed. However, after a while it became clear to the constitutionalists that the Russian troops do not plan on leaving. Disagreements between the Russian troops and the constitutionalists then heightened, and the Russian forces tried arresting Sattar Khan and Baqir Khan, both of whom took refuge in the Ottoman consulate in Tabriz along with some others. Tabriz was occupied by the Russians and the Constitutionalist forces in Tabriz were disbanded.

=== In Isfahan ===
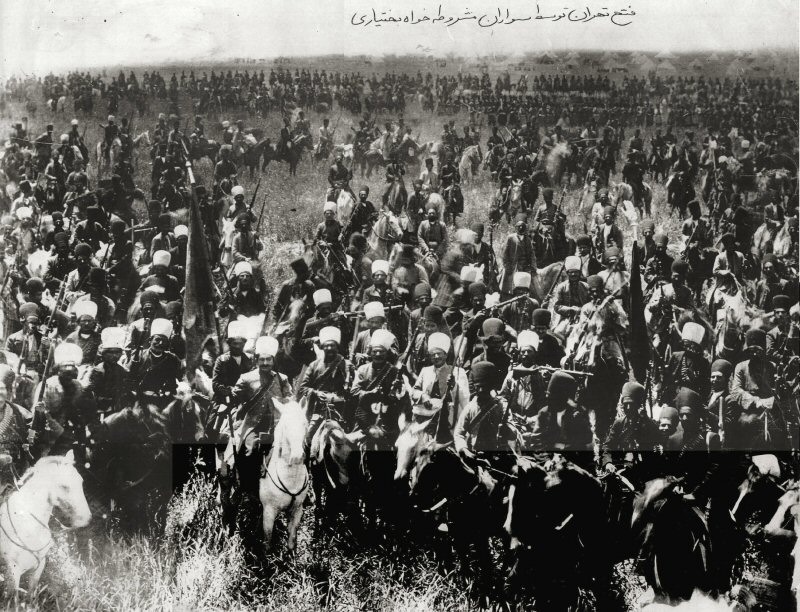
Bakhtiyari cavalrymen.

On 28 December 1908, Bazaaris and craftsmen closed the bazaar of Isfahan and gathered in the Shah Mosque. 5 days later, on 2 January 1909 a force of Bakhtiari cavalrymen led by Zargham as-Saltaneh fought with government forces near the city and after a few days, the governor of Isfahan, Eghbal as-Saltaneh, took refuge in the British consulate in Isfahan. On 15 January 1909, Samsam as-Saltaneh entered the city and assumed control in it. However, he did not call himself a governor and called for an election and establishment of a provincial council.

=== In Gilan ===
One of Mohammad Ali Shah's first actions after dissolving the parliament was appointing Mohammad Ali Sardar Afkham to govern Gilan. He had previously executed 11 constitutionalists in Tabriz and the Shah trusted him. Despite having an autocratic and harsh rule, he failed to subdue farmers in Talish region and stop constitutionalist associations' secret activities in Bandar-e Anzali and Rasht. Of these associations were the Tollab association led by Mirza Kuchik Khan and a branch of the Armenian Dashnak party that operated in Rasht. At the same time, two constitutionalist brothers named Karim Khan Rashti and Abd ad-Hossein khan decided to contact Caucasian social democrats and ask for help to topple Sardar Afkham. In a trip to Tbilisi in autumn of 1908 the Russian Social Democratic Party agreed to send forces to Gilan to help the constitutionalists there. At first, 23 volunteers went to Rasht but after a while their numbers grew to 35. They helped with producing ammunition and grenades as well as reconnaissance.

=== In Najaf ===
Some of the Twelver Shia Maraji' in the city of Najaf in the Ottoman Empire who had been pro constitutionalist prior to the bombardment of the parliament, issued Fatwas declaring the rule of Mohammad Ali Shah as unlawful and issued an order urging their followers to resist his rule. Akhund Khorasani, Mirza Husayn Tehrani and Abdallah Mazandarani were among the people who declared the Shah's rule unlawful. They declared paying taxes to the Shah's government as Haram and equivalent to waging war against the 12th Imam.

== Governance of the country during the Minor Tyranny ==
After overthrowing the parliament, the Shah sent a message to foreign embassies, declaring a public pardon. In practice however, his agents were still persecuting the Shah's opponents. After the extrajudicial killings of Malek al-Motekallemin and Jahangir Khan Sur-e Esrafil drew the criticism of foreign embassies, the Shah ordered the establishment of a court in Baghshah to mete out punishments to the Shah's opponents.

Initially, the Shah declared that he did not intend to abolish the constitutional government and would organize another parliamentary election in three months. However, after the end of a three month period, he postponed it for two months. On 7 November 1908, a group of influential people were invited to Baghshah and in the meeting that followed, Sheikh Fazlullah Nouri declared the constitutional government incompatible with Islamic law, and presented the Shah with telegrams from various cities in Iran showing popular opposition to the constitution. The people present at the session then asked the Shah to not reopen the parliament. In a similar session that happened on 19 November, the Shah was presented with a similar proposal and the Shah declared that in accordance to the people's proposal, he was abolishing the constitution, while an assembly called the Majles-e Shora-ye Kobra-ye Mamlekati (Persian: مجلس شورای کبری مملکتی) which had its members appointed by the Shah would replace the parliament.

The British and the Russian embassies declared their disagreement with this new assembly that would replace the parliament elected by the people, and put the Shah under pressure. The Shah asked for loans from the German Empire, promising to allow representatives from the people in the assembly in the future, but the German ambassador did not accept his proposal.

Mohammad Ali Shah gave the task of reworking the constitution to this assembly, but the constitutionalist forces from Gilan and Isfahan were on their way to Tehran and the new laws never went into effect. After the constitutionalist success in various cities in Iran, the Shah declared that he would restore the constitution and the parliament to their original form. He ordered the parliament to be reestablished on 4 May 1909. Following this order, the British and the Russian representatives in Iran tried negotiating an armistice with Ali-Qoli Khan Bakhtiari, which he rejected, stating that he and the constitutionalist forces would go to Tehran to oversee the reestablishment of the Parliament and the constitution, and would return with his forces if the Shah was truthful in his promises.

== Triumph of Tehran ==
With constitutionalist success in Isfahan, Azerbaijan and Gilan, further unrest spread across the nation and the government forces lost control of the cities of Bushehr, Bandar Abbas, Kermanshah and Mashhad. The government ran out of budget and foreign nations refused granting loans to maintain the Shah's military force of Cossacks.

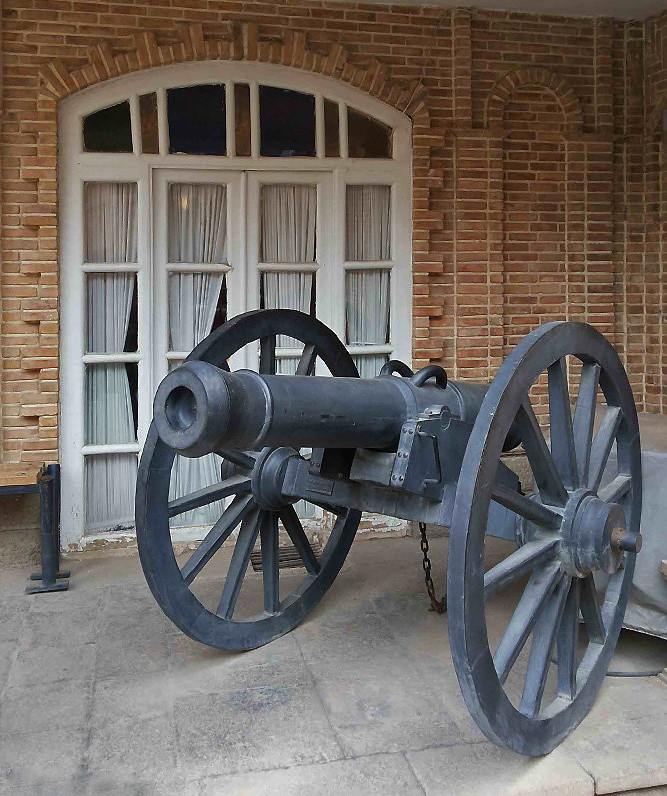
A cannon that was used in warfare during the constitutional revolution in Iran.

Constitutionalist forces, led by Ali-Qoli Khan Bakhtiari left Isfahan for Tehran on 31 May 1909. The Shah dispatched some of his Bakhtiyari troops led by Amir Mofakham to fight the constitutionalists. They took position in Hassanabad and stationed their cannons. The constitutionalist forces however, moved around them and joined the Gilani forces that had passed Karaj and were near Tehran. The constitutionalist force that had formed by the joining of the Bakhtiyari and the Gilani forces started moving towards Tehran on 24 June 1909. The Shah had armed the city gates with cannons and the Russian and British representatives tried to dissuade the constitutionalists from attacking the city.

To put pressure on the constitutionalists, the Russian Empire dispatched a force to Iran. This force that had gathered in Baku on 30 June 1909 reached Qazvin by 11 July.

Prior to the constitutionalist attack on the city, Bibi Maryam Bakhtiari and a group of Bakhtiyaris entered the city in secret to flank the Shahist forces and fight them from the inside as soon as conflict breaks out. On 13 July 1909 the constitutionalist forces managed to take over the Behjat Abad gate and enter the city. They captured Baharestan and positioned themselves in the Sepahsalar Mosque. Mohammad Ali Shah moved to Saltanat Abad with 3000 soldiers and 16 cannons. conflict continued in the city for three days until on 16 July 1909 the Shah took refuge in the Russian embassy, Vladimir Liakhov surrendered and the city fell into constitutionalist control, ending the period of time known as the Minor Tyranny.

During the conflict, more than 500 people lost their lives and according to British sources, no looting took place from the constitutionalist side, but the Royalists engaged in looting.

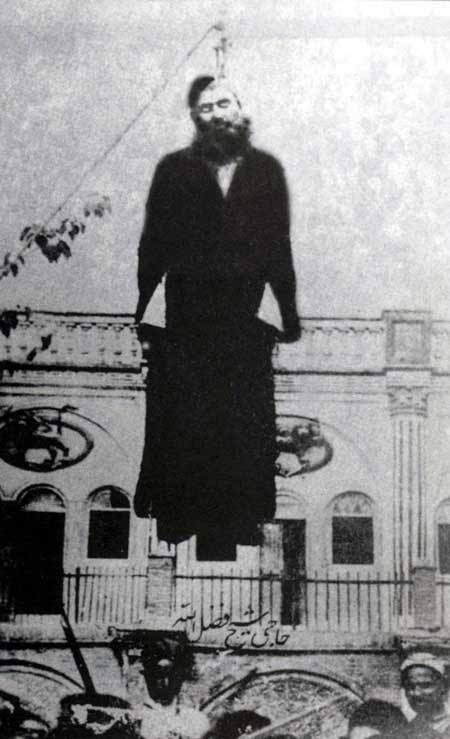
Sheikh Fazlollah Nouri being hanged.

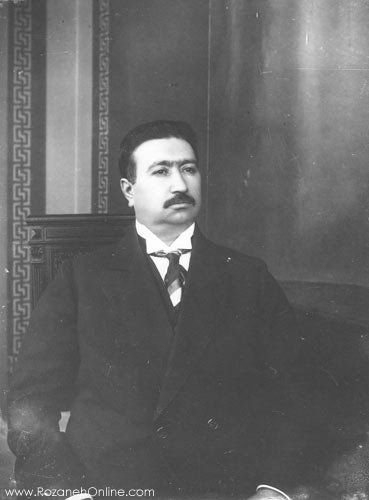
Mohammad Ali Shah after being deposed

=== Transfer of power ===
After the capture of Tehran, the constitutionalists and the Russian government reached an agreement allowing the Persian Cossack Brigade to function as it did previously and the Russian government recognized the constitutionalist government as legitimate.

A grand assembly, consisting of the nobility, clergy, bureaucrats, merchants and constitutionalists formed and removed Mohammad Ali Shah from the position of monarch, putting his infant child Ahmad Mirza in his place. Considering the age of the new Shah, the head of the Qajar family Azod ol-Molk was appointed as regent. Mohammad Vali Khan Tonekaboni was appointed as prime minister and minister of war, Ali-Qoli Khan Bakhtiari was appointed as minister of interior and Yeprem Khan was declared the head of the Tehran law enforcement.

A court was formed in Tehran, putting up trials against the royalist leaders which sentenced people like Sheikh Fazlullah Nouri, Mir Hashem Tabrizi and Mafakher ol-Molk to death.

On 21 August 1909, Mohammad Hassan Mirza was declared heir apparent to Ahmad Shah. On 9 September, the dethroned Mohammad Ali Shah left Iran for Odesa with 40 of his retinue.

The Parliament building was repaired by Sheikh Hassan Me'mar paid by Keikhosrow Shahrokh and the second parliament was inaugurated on 14 November 1909 with a speech from Ahmad Shah Qajar. With the vote of the parliament members, Hossein Pirnia became the speaker of the parliament and Mohammad Vali Khan Tonekaboni formed a cabinet as prime minister.
