= Bibi Maryam Bakhtiari =

Iranian politician (1874–1937)

- بی‌بی مریم بختیاری
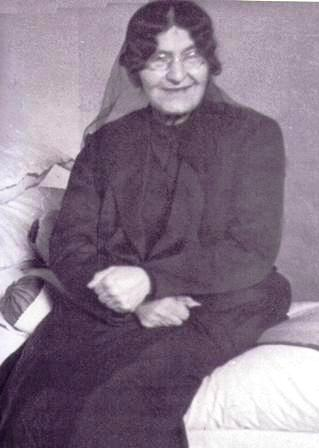
- Born: 1874; Sureshjan, Sublime State of Iran
- Died: 1937 (aged 62–63); Isfahan, Imperial State of Iran
- Resting place: Takht-e Foulad, Isfahan
- Known for: Female Iranian Constitutional Revolutionary
- Father: Hossein Gholi Khan Ilkhani
- Relatives: Ali-Qoli Khan Bakhtiari (brother); Najaf-Qoli Khan Bakhtiari (brother); Khorou Khan Bakhtiari Sardar Zafar (brother)

Bibi Maryam Bakhtiari (Luri/Persian: بی‌بی مریم بختیاری; 1874 – 1937) was an Iranian Lur Bakhtiari revolutionary and activist of the Iranian Constitutional Revolution. As a military commander, she played a distinguished role when Bakhtiari forces, with the help of modern arms from the German Empire, successfully captured Tehran in 1909 as part of the revolutionary campaign to force the central government to establish democratic reforms.

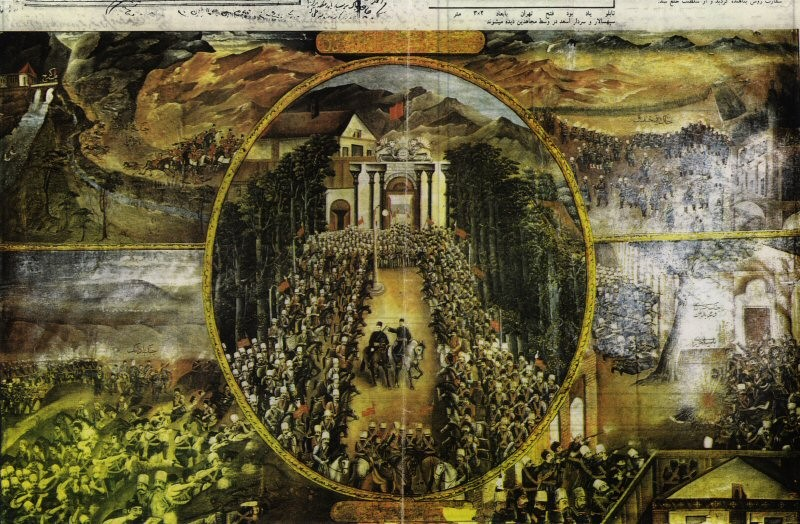
Commemorative poster (3x4 m^{2}) pertaining to the conquest of Tehran by the Bakhtiari Constitutional Revolutionaries in July 1909.

Bibi Maryam Bakhtiari, a woman of the Constitutional era and the First World War, was the first Iranian woman—and the only woman in the world—to receive the highest German military decoration (the enameled and diamond-studded effigy and the Iron Cross) by order of Wilhelm II, in recognition of her protection of the life of the German chargé d'affaires during the First World War.

== Life ==
Bibi Maryam was one of the foremost women's rights activists and pioneers of freedom movements in the constitutional movement in Iran. Because of her lifestyle, Bibi Maryam was skilled in shooting techniques and craftsmanship. A separate account of Qajar-era fortifications in the province also attributes the (now-destroyed) Surshajan castle to Bibi Maryam Bakhtiari. ISNA reports that German agents and diplomatic figures sought refuge in Surshajan during World War I, and that a German imperial medal was presented to her in a formal ceremony there.

== Role in the Iranian Constitutional Revolution ==
Bibi Maryam was one of the main proponents of Sardar Asad Bakhtiari, to conquer Tehran. Through several letters and telegraphs, as well as lectures, she prepared tribal forces to fight against Mohammad Ali Shah Qajar's Minor tyranny. Before the liberation of Tehran by the Constitutionalist forces in 1909, she moved to Tehran accompanied by some skilled Bakhtiary warriors and stayed in her father's house for guerrilla planning.

When Sardar Asa'd's forces reached Tehran, she and her husband's warriors joined the constitutionalist forces against Mohammad Ali Shah's troops. She participated directly in armed resistance against the Cossacks alongside the Luri warriors. Following her role in the fight and her involvement in disarming the ruling troops, she was given the honorary rank of Sardar (high commander), and became known as Sardar Bibi Maryam Bakhtiari.

== See also ==
- Ali-Qoli Khan Bakhtiari
- Qadam Kheyr
