= Triumph of Tehran =

1909 entry of pro-constitution forces into Tehran

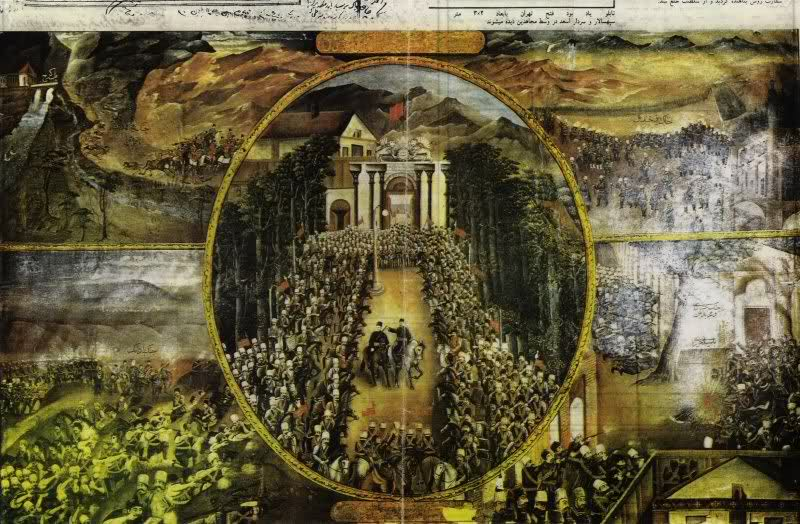
Painting of the Triumph of Tehran, in Sa'dabad Palace.

The Triumph of Tehran (Persian: فتح تهران, romanized: fath-e tehrān) refers to the entrance of the pro-constitutionalists in Tehran on 13 July 1909, which led Mohammad Ali Shah Qajar to seek refuge at the Russian legation in Tehran, before he was sent to exile. The event ended the period in Iranian history known as the Minor Tyranny.

Following numerous clashes between Mohammad Ali Shah and the Majlis (Iranian Parliament) in 1907 and 1908 (1286 and 1287 AH), the Shah dissolved the parliament on 2 July 1908 (1287 AH), and imposed martial law on Tehran. Despite his claims of continued loyalty to the constitutional monarchy, many constitutionalists in Tehran and other Iranian cities were arrested or forced into exile. However, in Tabriz, government forces were unable to gain control, and constitutionalist fighters led by Sattar Khan and Baqir Khan initiated an armed resistance. The resistance of the people of Tabriz revived the hopes of the constitutionalists, and while exiled political activists and the ulema of Najaf condemned Mohammad Ali Shah's coup, movements formed in Rasht and Isfahan, ultimately leading to the capture of these cities by the constitutionalists.

On 5 May 1288 AH, several hundred constitutionalist forces from Rasht, commanded by Mohammad Vali Khan Tonekaboni and Yeprem Khan, captured Qazvin, aiming to advance towards Tehran. From the south, Bakhtiari forces, led by Sardar Assad Bakhtiari, marched from Isfahan towards Tehran on 21 May 1288 AH, and eventually joined the Gilani army, which had crossed Karaj and reached the vicinity of Tehran. Sardar Maryam Bakhtiari and a number of Bakhtiari forces secretly entered Tehran before the arrival of the constitutionalist forces to fortify positions around the parliament as soon as the clashes began. On 13 July, the constitutionalist forces managed to enter Tehran. The clashes in the city continued for three days until 17 July when Mohammad Ali Shah sought refuge in the Russian embassy, and the capital came under the control of the constitutionalists. Following the capture of Tehran, a High Council was formed, which deposed Mohammad Ali Shah and appointed his son, Ahmad Mirza, as Shah.

One of the unique features of this event was the intervention of the Bakhtiari tribe in the Constitutional Revolution, marking the first participation of an Iranian tribe in support of the constitutionalist movement. Prior to this, Iranian tribes had either not intervened in the constitutional movement or had sided with Mohammad Ali Shah.

== Background ==
In 1908, revolutionaries gathered in Azerbaijan, Isfahan (led by Ali-Qoli Khan Bakhtiari and his elder brother Najaf-Qoli Khan Bakhtiari), and Gilan, aiming to depose Mohammad Ali Shah Qajar. They killed Mohammed Ali Sardar Afkham (Aqa Balakhan) (fa), Rasht's governor.

== Events ==
After a five-day battle, the revolutionaries took the capital's control. At the same time, their leaders gathered in Baharestan palace and decided to replace Mohammad Ali Shah Qajar with Ahmad Shah Qajar.

All these changes took place under the name of Superior parliament which involved 30 people.

=== Events in Isfahan ===
On 27 December 1908, the merchants and guilds of Isfahan closed the bazaar and gathered at the Shah Mosque. Melkazadeh attributed the start of the clashes to the mistreatment of the people by the soldiers of Iqbal al-Dowleh, the governor of Isfahan. Melkazadeh states that the merchants closed their shops and those who had weapons took up positions on the heights and fired at government buildings. In response, Iqbal al-Dowleh's soldiers looted people's property. As a result, the group of protesting people grew larger, and the people took refuge in the Shah Mosque. Noorullah Najafi Isfahani, a prominent cleric in Isfahan, supported the popular movement in his speeches. He, along with Sardar Assad Bakhtiari, who had returned to Isfahan from Europe at the encouragement of his constitutionalist friends, went to the Bakhtiari khans to negotiate and sent a message to Samsam al-Saltaneh Bakhtiari to intervene militarily and take control of Isfahan.

Samsam al-Saltaneh set three conditions for intervention: a guarantee from the city's notables to assist the Bakhtiaris, payment of wages to the Bakhtiari riders, and the joining of several city notables to the Bakhtiari riders before their entry into the city. These three conditions were immediately accepted. With the news of the Bakhtiaris joining the movement, Iqbal al-Dowleh, in an attempt to suppress the opposition before the arrival of the Bakhtiari forces, ordered an attack on the Shah Mosque. However, the constitutionalists closed the doors of the mosque and fired at the attackers from the roof. After failing to prevent the defenders from firing by shelling the dome of the mosque, government forces went to the Sheikh Lotfollah Mosque and exchanged fire with the defenders from the roof. A group of Iqbal al-Dowleh's armed forces also attacked the bazaar. Melkazadeh reported that the sound of cannons shook the city and the courtyard of the mosque was filled with gunpowder smoke and the noise of the fighting forces. The clashes continued until the arrival of the Bakhtiari forces in the city.

On 2 January, the Bakhtiari riders led by Zarghām al-Saltaneh clashed with government forces in Isfahan, and Iqbal al-Dowleh took refuge in the British consulate after several days of fighting. Samsam al-Saltaneh entered Isfahan on 5 January and took control of the city. He did not consider himself the governor of Isfahan, but instead called for elections and the formation of a provincial council. The support of the Bakhtiari tribe for the constitutionalists of Isfahan is of particular historical importance, as until then, the major tribes of the country had either lined up against the constitution or had taken a passive and neutral stance.

Although Samsam al-Saltaneh had personal goals of regaining the position of ilkhâni of the Bakhtiari tribe in intervening in favor of the constitutionalists, his goals were not limited to an intra-tribal conflict and entered the struggle against the central government and efforts to establish the rule of law in the country.

To confront the uprising, the government appointed Abd al-Hossein Mirza Farmanfarma as governor of Isfahan and sent him to Isfahan with several hundred Bakhtiari riders led by Zafar Khan. However, Abd al-Hossein Mirza decided not to go to Isfahan. Along with the Bakhtiari soldiers, who were reluctant to fight their relatives and tribesmen, he did not go beyond Kashan. Zafar Khan also dispersed his military forces.

=== Events in Gilan ===
The Iranian Constitutional Revolution saw a significant uprising in Gilan province, spearheaded by a coalition of local and foreign forces. Led by Karim Khan Rashti and his brother Abdul Hussein Khan, a group of constitutionalists sought to overthrow Sardar Afkham, a local governor. To achieve this, they enlisted the help of Russian Social Democrats, who provided experienced fighters and resources. These volunteers played a crucial role in training local forces, conducting reconnaissance, and ultimately, in the successful takeover of Rasht.

The alliance between the Rashti brothers and the Russian Social Democrats was strategic. While the Rashti brothers held significant political influence and connections, the Social Democrats offered military expertise and manpower. Notably, the participation of Armenian revolutionaries, led by Yeprem Khan, was instrumental in the success of the uprising. Despite initial tensions between the Rashti brothers and the Dashnak Party, the shared goal of overthrowing the monarchy and establishing a constitutional government brought them together.

The culmination of the uprising occurred in February 1909 when the forces led by the Rashti brothers and their allies launched a coordinated attack on Rasht. Sardar Afkham was killed, and the city fell under the control of the constitutionalists. A revolutionary committee, known as the "Sattar Committee," was formed to govern the city. The committee, led by prominent figures such as Moez al-Saltaneh, Mirza Hussein Kasmaei, and Yeprem Khan, adopted a moderate policy and invited Mohammad Vali Khan Sepahsalar to assume the governorship of Gilan.

The successful takeover of Rasht by the constitutionalists marked a significant turning point in the Iranian Constitutional Revolution. The cooperation between Iranian nationalists, Russian Social Democrats, and Armenian revolutionaries showcased the complex dynamics of the revolution. The establishment of the Sattar Committee and the subsequent invitation to Sepahsalar to govern Gilan demonstrated the efforts of the revolutionaries to establish a stable and representative government in the region. The events in Gilan inspired similar uprisings across Iran and ultimately contributed to the restoration of the constitutional monarchy.

=== Events in Tehran ===
To pressure the Constitutionalist forces, Russia dispatched an army to invade Iran. These forces, comprising a Cossack regiment, an infantry corps, and an artillery unit, assembled in Baku on 1 July 1909. Five days later, they were sent to Anzali and Qazvin, as reported by Count Alexander Benckendorff, the Russian ambassador to London. They reached Qazvin on 11 July. Meanwhile, Sepahsalar and Sardar Assad sent a letter to Mohammad Ali Shah, outlining their demands, which included the withdrawal of Russian forces from Iran, the selection of ministers by provincial assemblies, and the dismissal of several of the Shah's confidants. The Shah rejected these demands, prompting the Constitutionalists to decide to attack Tehran.

As the Constitutionalists advanced toward Tehran, the first skirmish occurred halfway between Qazvin and Tehran at Yengi Imam, lasting three hours and resulting in a Constitutionalist victory. While most of the Constitutionalist forces halted at Yengi Imam to rest, four vanguard groups led by Yeprem Khan, Asadollah Khan Sartip, Haji Moosa Khan Mirpanj, and Mirza Ali Khan Kajouri Salar Fatih advanced toward Karaj. They encountered no resistance in Karaj, as the defending government forces had fled. A nighttime pursuit ensued, resulting in casualties on both sides, forcing the Constitutionalists to retreat to Karaj.

From the south, the Bakhtiari forces, led by Sardar Assad Bakhtiari, marched from Isfahan towards Tehran on 21 May 1909. Mohammad Ali Shah dispatched a force loyal to him, commanded by Amir Mufakham, to confront them. However, after failing to persuade Amir Mufakham to cease hostilities, Sardar Assad outmaneuvered him and joined the Gilani forces near Tehran. The Gilani forces, mistaking the approaching Bakhtiari forces for government troops in disguise, opened fire, leading to a brief but costly skirmish.

Ultimately, the united Constitutionalist forces, comprising the Gilani and Bakhtiari armies, advanced towards Tehran on 22 June 1909. Mohammad Ali Shah had fortified the gates of Tehran and Russian and British envoys attempted to dissuade them from attacking the capital. The first battle took place at Badamk. After three days of fighting, the Constitutionalist forces decided to launch a surprise nighttime attack on Tehran, believing that the government forces in the capital had been weakened. On 22 July, the National Forces successfully entered Tehran through the Behjatabad Gate. They captured Baharestan and the northern neighborhoods of Tehran and established themselves at the Sepahsalar Mosque. Mohammad Ali Shah fled to Saltanatabad Palace with 3,000 soldiers and sixteen cannons. The fighting continued for three days until 25 July, when Mohammad Ali Shah sought refuge in the Russian embassy, Liakhov surrendered, and the capital fell under the control of the Constitutionalists.

The capture of Tehran marked a significant victory for the Constitutionalist movement in Iran. It led to the downfall of Mohammad Ali Shah and the restoration of the constitutional monarchy. The event is considered a pivotal moment in Iranian history, as it established the principle of constitutional rule and limited the absolute power of the monarchy.

== See also ==
- Persian Constitutional Revolution
