= Hossein Gholi Khan Ilkhani =

Iranian nobleman (1821–1882)

Hossein Gholi Khan Ilkhani Ilkhan-e Bakhtiari
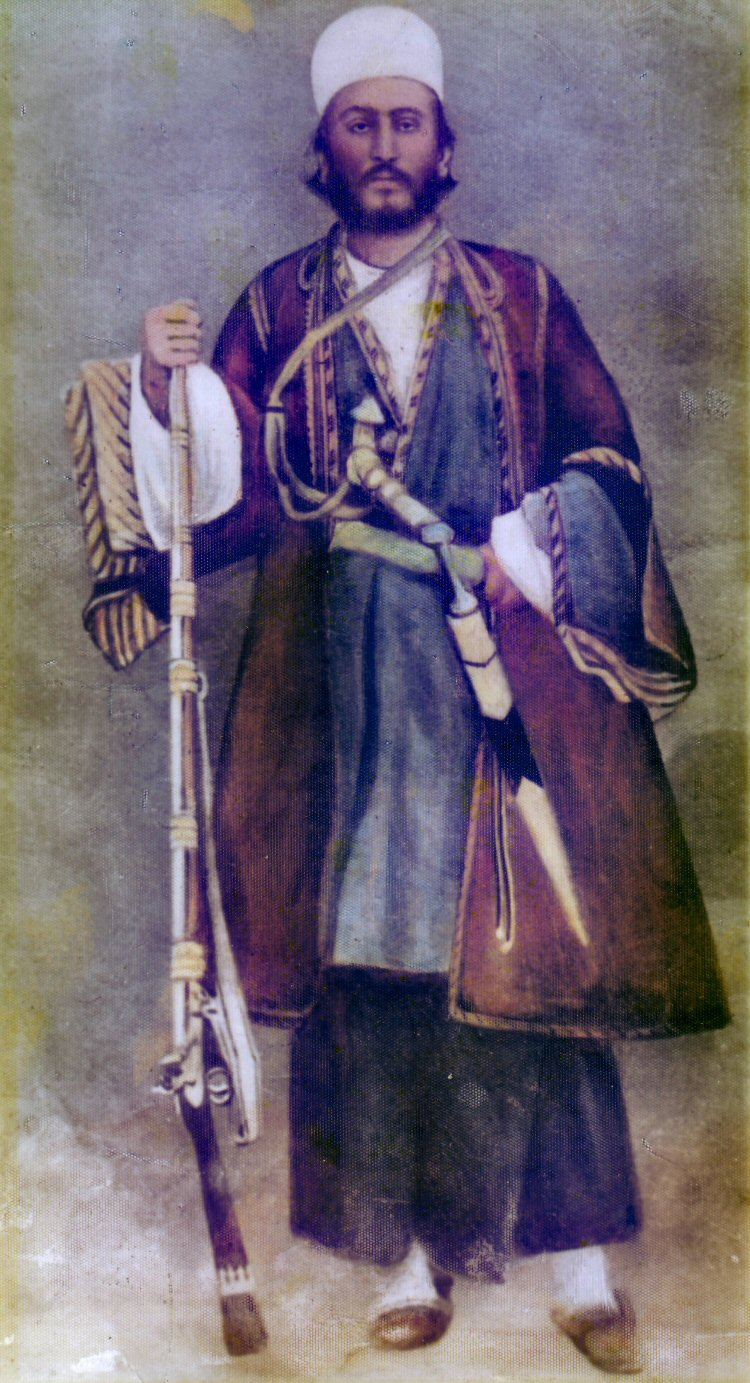
- Native name: حسینقلی‌خان ایلخانی
- Born: 1821; Iran
- Died: 14 June 1882 (aged 60–61) Isfahan, Iran
- Children: Ali-Qoli Khan Bakhtiari; Najaf-Qoli Khan Bakhtiari; Bibi Maryam Bakhtiari; Yusuf Khan Amir Mujahid

Hossein Gholi Khan Ilkhani (Persian: حسینقلی‌خان ایلخانی; 1821–1882) was an Iranian nobleman of the Bakhtiari tribe and a powerful khan (lord). Hossein Gholi Khan united the Bakhtiari tribes, killing many opponents in the process, and eventually turning the Bakhtiari clan — which hitherto had no role in politics — into one of the most powerful political poles of Qajar Iran. Most of Hossein Gholi Khan's children, including Ali-Gholi Khan Bakhtiari, played a role in important events in contemporary Iranian history, such as the Constitutional Revolution.

Towards the end of his life, Hossein Gholi Khan formed an alliance with Mass'oud Mirza Zell-e Soltan, the governor of Isfahan, and gained such power that he intended to stage a coup against Naser al-Din Shah Qajar. However, Mirza Yusuf Ashtiani, the Shah's Prime Minister, poisoned him with Qajar coffee.

== Early life ==
Hossein Gholi Khan Zarasvand Duraki, son of Jafar Gholi Khan Zarasvand Duraki and Bibi Shahpasand (daughter of Ali Saleh Al-Jamali), was born in 1821 in the Choghakhor region. His father, Jafar Qolikhan, was one of the two most powerful khans in the Bakhtiari tribe. When Hossein Gholi Khan was 16 years old, his father was killed in a dispute between the Bakhtiari tribes by Jafar Qoli Khan Behdarvand in 1836.

He and his brothers — Emam Qoli Khan, Reza Qali Khan and Mustafa Qoli Khan — spent their childhood and adolescence under the tutelage of their uncle, Kulb Ali Khan Duraki. When they came of age, a rift broke out between the brothers and their uncle over the division of power and property.

== War with Kulb Ali Khan ==
The dispute precipitated an intra-tribal war between the three brothers, on the one hand, and Kulb Ali Khan on the other.

In the early phase, victory belonged to Kulb Ali Khan, who had increased his fighting power by forming an alliance with Jafar Gholi Khan Behdarvand. However, it was the young Hussein Gholi Khan who was eventually victorious.

== Increasing position in the Qajar court ==
Hossein Gholi Khan quickly moved against other tribal leaders. He first defeated the powerful Mohammad Taghi Khan Bakhtiari, who had refused to pay taxes to the central government, and then had him executed. Next, he moved against the elderly Khan of the Babadi tribe, Musa Khan. Uniting the Bakhtiari clan, he suppressed rebellions against the central government and ended banditry, gaining the gratitude of the court. By 1857, he had become the most powerful warlord in Qajar Iran and became a courtier.

== Death ==
Prime Minister Mirza Yusuf Ashtiani was concerned about the military power and wealth of Hossein Gholi Khan, particularly, his alliance with Mass'oud Mirza Zell-e Soltan in the western and southern regions of the country. Hussein Gholi Khan was poisoned with Qajar coffee and died 3 days later, on 14 June 1882.
