= Ali-Qoli Khan Bakhtiari =

Iranian revolutionary (1856–1917)

Sardar Hajj Ali-Qoli Khan Bakhtiari
- علی‌قلی ‌خان بختیاری
- Portrait of Sardar Asad, 1909
- Born: 1856/57; Chaharmahal-Bakhtiari, Sublime State of Iran
- Died: 1 November 1917; Tehran, Sublime State of Iran
- Resting place: Takht-e Foulad cemetery, Isfahan, Iran
- Father: Hossein Gholi Khan Ilkhani
- Relatives: Bibi Maryam Bakhtiari (sister); Najaf-Qoli Khan Bakhtiari (brother); Khorou Khan Bakhtiari Sardar Zafar (brother)
- Military career
- Conflicts: Persian Constitutional Revolution; Siege of Isfahan (1909); Triumph of Tehran; Battle of Varamin (1909)

Sardar Asaad Bakhtyari (Luri/Persian: سردار اسعد بختیاری; c. 1856 – 1917), also known as Hajj Ali-Gholi Khan, Sardar Asaad II (born Ali-Gholi Khan) was an Iranian revolutionary and a chieftain of the Bakhtiari Haft Lang tribe. The third son of Hossein Gholi Khan Ilkhani, he was one of the primary figures of the Persian Constitutional Revolution.

== Early life ==
He was born in 1856 or 1857 at Garmsir in the Bakhtiari-Chaharmahal province. His father, Hossein Gholi Khan Ilkhani, having united the Bakhtiari tribes, had turned them into the most powerful clan in late Qajar Iran. His mother was Bibi Mehri-Jan, the granddaughter of Elias Khan Bakhtiari and daughter of Najaf Khan Bakhtiari. Ali Gholi Khan received an education atypical for a nomadic adolescent, learning Arabic and French alongside Persian.

In 1876, he married Bibi Mahdashan, the daughter of one of the elders of the Bakhtiari clan. He was summoned to Tehran in 1881, with his father and older brother Esfandiar Khan, by Naser al-Din Shah Qajar out of the monarch’s concerns over the growing power of the Bakhtiari clan. Shortly after, his father was poisoned and he and his brother were imprisoned. Ali Gholi Khan relates these events in his book Tarikh-e Bakhtiari ("The History of the Bakhtiari").

During his year in prison, his family endured hardship and isolation. After his release, Ali Gholi Khan was sent as a hostage to the court in Tehran and used as leverage against his brother, Esfandiar, who had succeeded their father as the Ilkhani [Lord Chieftain] of the Bakhtiari clan. At the Qajar court, Ali Gholi Khan learned about politics and court etiquette and established a network within the country’s political elite. He also forged links with foreign diplomats, particularly within the British Embassy, who had interests in southwestern Iran – the seat of Bakhtiari power.

William Knox D'Arcy, by contract with the Bakhtiari leadership, obtained permission to explore for oil for the first time in the Middle East, an event which changed the history of the entire region.

== Bakhtiari Leadership ==
After Naser ed-Din Shah was assassinated in May 1896, Ali Gholi Khan was given the task of maintaining order in Tehran. During the reign of Mozaffar ad-Din Shah Qajar, he remained the commander of the Bakhtiari Cavalry entrusted with guarding the shah and in 1896 was promoted to the rank of brigadier general. As a reward for his loyalty, he was also given a stipend of 1,000 Tomans.

When his older brother became incapacitated, Ali Gholi Khan was acknowledged by the Shah as the Ilkhan-e-Bakhtiari (Lord Chieftain of the Bakhtiari). However, he faced fierce competition for this title from his older brother, Najaf-Qoli Khan Bakhtiari Samsam al-Saltanah, who by tradition had the right to be the patriarch of the clan. Under pressure from Bakhtiari leaders, Ali Gholi Khan relinquished the title to Samsam al-Saltanah.

In 1900, Ali Gholi Khan travelled to India and briefly resided in Egypt before embarking to Europe. For the next two years, he travelled across the European continent, visiting different capitals, and participating in high society, which may have piqued his interest in politics.

He returned to Iran in 1902 and settled for a time in Tehran. The death of Esfandiar, his oldest brother, in 1903 led to a feud between the two main branches of the Ilkhani family: the sons of Hossein Gholi Khan (Samsam al-Saltanah and Khosrou Sardar Zafar) and the sons of Emam Gholi Khan (Lotf Ali Khan Amir Mofkham, Nasir Khan Sardar Jang, Sultan Mohammad Khan Sardar Ashja, and Gholam Hossein Khan Sardar Mohtashm). Playing a peacemaker, Ali Gholi Khan managed to reconcile the different factions and ended the feud.

In 1904, at the suggestion of the Prime Minister (Ain al-Dawlah), the Shah awarded him with the title of Sardar Assad and promoted him to a courtier. At the same time, he was charged with maintaining order in the Lorestan region.

== The Iranian Constitutional Revolution ==
By 1904, Sardar Assad’s cooperation with the constitutionalist movement was well on its way. On 27 May he hosted a meeting of the constitutionalist leaders in the private garden of Suleiman Khan, which later came to be known as the Mikdeh Garden Association. He expanded his network of supporters across southern Iran over the next several years and, travelling to Europe, met with leaders of the opposition in exile.

He returned to Iran on 16 May 1909 and, upon entering the Bakhtiari region, signed an agreement with the Qashqai chieftain, Sheikh Khazal, who represented the Arabs of Khuzestan. With the exception of Karim Khan Bahadur of Boyer Ahmad province, Sardar Assad secured the support of all major tribal leaders in southern Iran in preparation for marching on the capital. Accompanied by Bakhtiari chieftains, he first led a 700-strong cavalry into Esfahan and then advanced towards Tehran.

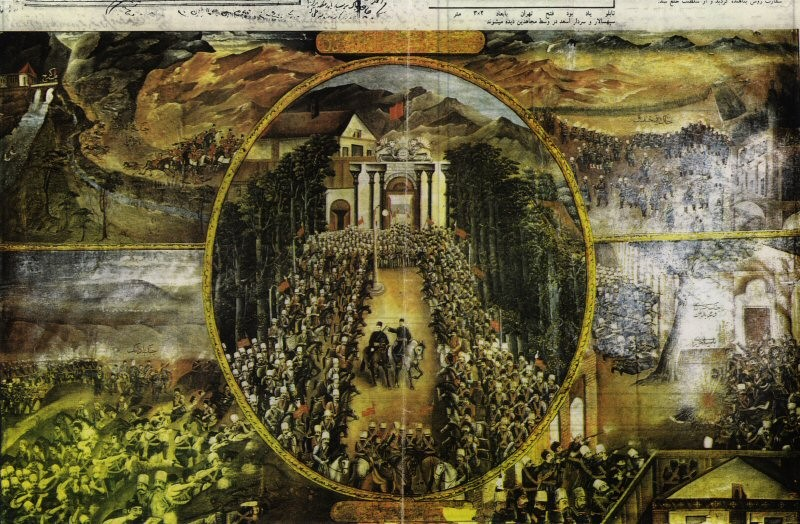
Commemorative poster pertaining to the Triumph of Tehran in July 1909. The two men on horse are Sardar Asad and Mohammad Vali Khan Tonekaboni.

On 22 July 1909, Sardar Assad’s Bakhtiary cavalry came into contact with the northern insurrectionists led by Sattar Khan and Baqer Khan. After conferring at Badamek, the two armies jointly entered Tehran. On 16 July 1909, resistance ended as loyalists surrendered. Mohammad Ali Shah Qajar accompanied with 500 guards and members of his family and relatives, took refuge in the Russian Embassy. With the power of the National Assembly restored, the body called on all groups to lay down their weapons.

When Sattar Khan and Baqer Khan refused to disarm, Sardar Assad sent an ultimatum to Sattar Khan, reminding him of the oath he took at Badamek to uphold the Constitution. Hours later, 1,000 Bakhtiari horsemen under the command of Jafar Gholi Khan, Sardar Assad’s son, surrounded Atabek Park. 150 northerns and 12 Bakhtiari cavalrymen died in the fighting that ensued. Restoring public order on behalf of the National Assembly, Sardar Assad imprisoned around 350 loyalists and insurrectionists. He was one of the signatories of Sheikh Fazlullah Nouri’s execution – the highest ranking Shia cleric in the country who had allied himself with the Shah in opposition to the Constitutionalists.

== Final Years ==
On 25 July 1909, Mohammad Ali Shah abdicated and was succeeded by his twelve-year son Ahmad Mirza. Sardar Assad was appointed first Minister of the Interior and then Minister of War in the newly-formed cabinet. In 1910, he resigned from his post and travelled to Europe for an eye operation. During his absence from Iran, Mohammad Ali Shah regained his throne, with Russian assistance, and set about restoring autocracy.

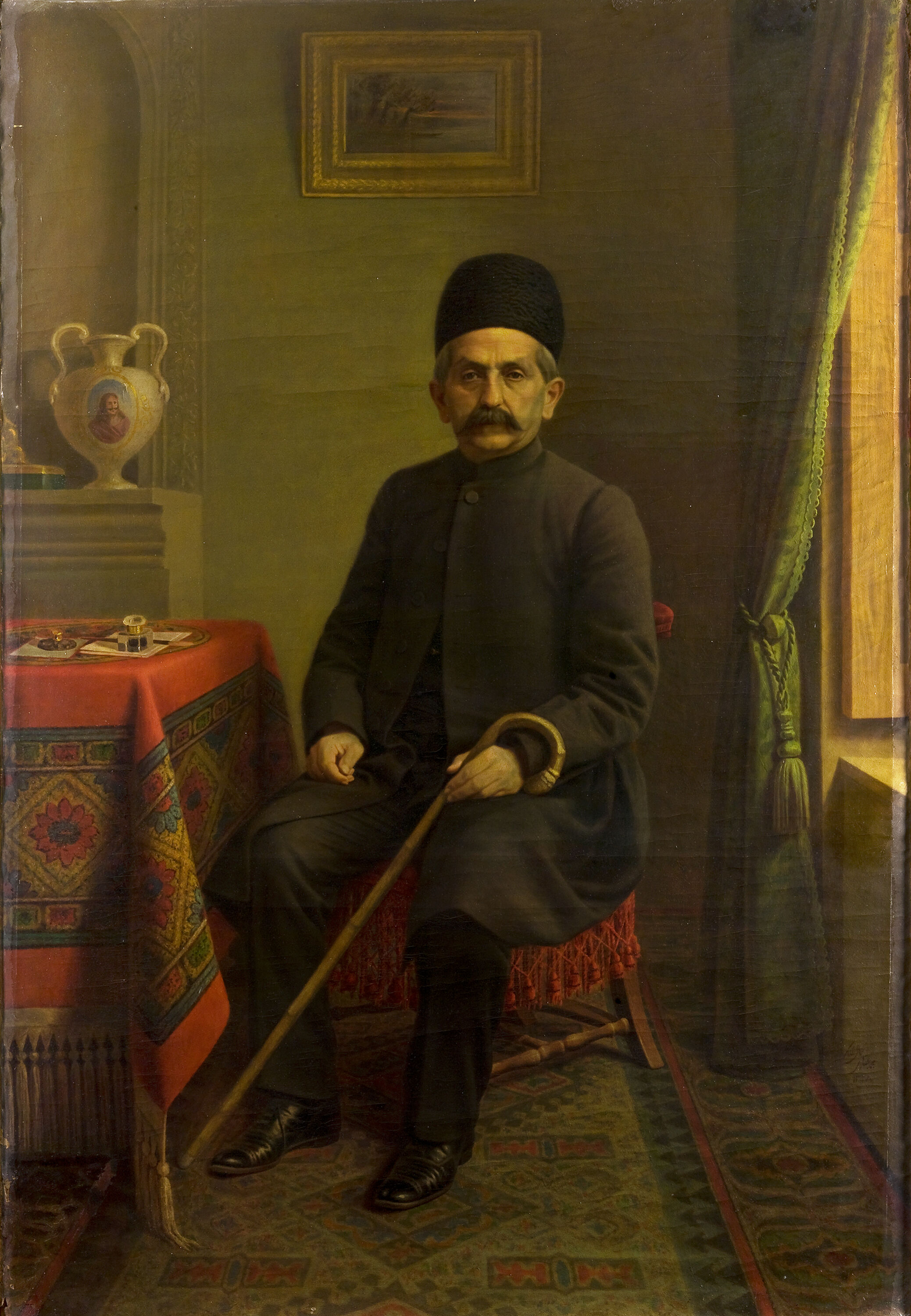
Portrait of Sardar Asad by Kamal-ol-molk, 1911

While he was in Paris, members of the National Assembly and the Viceroy, Naser-ol-Molk, invited Sardar Assad to return to Iran. Arriving in Tehran in July 1912, he served as an advisor to his brother Samsam al-Saltaneh, who was now prime minister, and was pivotal in maintaining peace between the feuding factions of the Bakhtiari clan over the next year. Thereafter, he retired from public life.

One of the most influential figures of Iranian history at the turn of the 20th century, Sardar Assad died on 1 November 1917 in Tehran. His body was transferred to Isfahan and was buried in the family tomb at Takht-e Foulad.

== See also ==
- Sepahsalar-e Tonekaboni, similar figure
