= Mohammad Vali Khan Khalatbari Tonekaboni =

Leader of the Iranian constitutionalist revolutionary forces (1846–1926)

Sepahsalar-e Khalatbari Tonekaboni
- سپهسالار خلعتبری تنکابنی
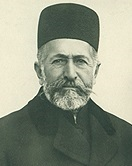

5th Prime Minister of Iran
- In office 30 September 1909 – 25 July 1910
- Monarch: Ahmad Shah Qajar
- Preceded by: Javad Sa'd al-Dowleh (Acting); Moshir al-Saltaneh
- Succeeded by: Mostowfi ol-Mamalek
- In office 12 March 1911 – 26 July 1911
- Monarch: Ahmad Shah Qajar
- Preceded by: Mostowfi ol-Mamalek
- Succeeded by: Najaf-Qoli Samsam al-Saltaneh
- In office 5 March 1916 – 29 August 1916
- Monarch: Ahmad Shah Qajar
- Preceded by: Abdol-Hossein Farmanfarma
- Succeeded by: Vosough od-Dowleh

Personal details
- Born: 1846 Tonekabon, Sublime State of Iran
- Died: 18 September 1926 (aged 80) Tehran, Imperial State of Iran
- Resting place: Imamzadeh Saleh
- Party: Moderate Socialists Party

Mohammad-Vali Khan, Khalatbari Tonekāboni (Persian: محمدولی‌خان خلعتبری تنکابنی; 1846 – 18 September 1926), also known as Sepahdar A'zam (سپهدار اعظم), was the leader of the constitutionalist revolutionary forces from Iran's northern provinces of Gilan and Mazandaran and known as one of the greatest statesmen and military commanders of Iranian history as well as its wealthiest nobleman.

== Biography ==
He served as colonel for ten years and became Minister of Post and Telegraph as well as Minister of Customs where he was in charge of all imports into and exports out of Iran. Later he became Minister of Treasury where he was singlehandedly in charge of the entire country's coin issue. He also held the title of Minister of Defence and was Prime Minister for four terms. His highest military title was Commander in Chief. He was of the noble Khalatbari family.

As an ethnic Persian, Sepahsalar Khalatbari was the only leader who was able to restore Iran's security by controlling the country's Turkmen population. He was called upon many times by not only the various sectors of the Iranian government, but also by the Russians to suppress the Turkmen. His enormous wealth with income estimated at US$2 million/year in the early 1900s (the equivalent of $530 million/year in 2000), allowed him to be the chief financier of Iran, where he would use his property as collateral for loans Iran obtained from Russia and Britain.

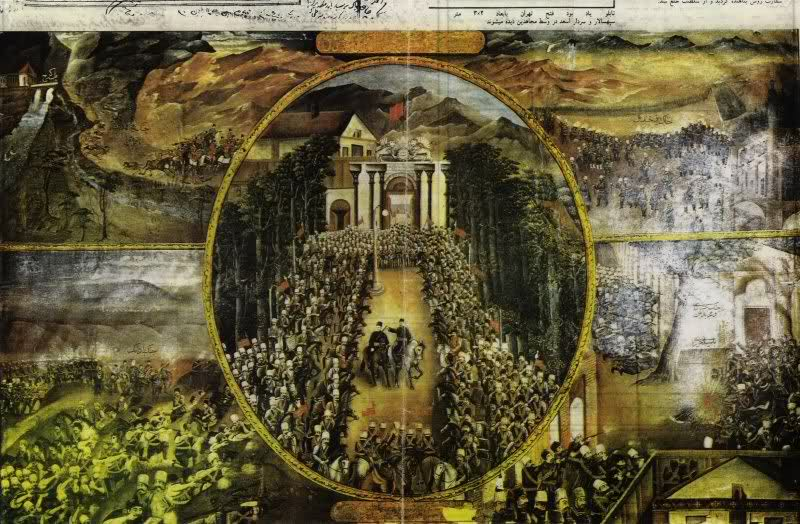
Commemorative poster (3 x 4 m^{2}) pertaining to the conquest of Tehran by the Constitutional Revolutionaries in July 1909. The two men on horse are Mohammad Vali Khan (Sepahsālār-e A'zam-e Tankāboni), and Sardar As'ad.

In 1909, he was given the title Sepahdar Azam and was sent by Mohammad Ali Shah Qajar, to crush the Azerbaijani constitutionalist uprising in the northwest headed by Baqer Khan and Sattar Khan. He arrived in Azerbaijan but refused to fight the constitutionalist forces deeming it "fratricide". Instead he returned to Tonekabon and due to his genius military skills and national democratic following became the leader of the constitutionalist and anti-royalist forces, the same forces he was sent to crush. As their new leader he first occupied the city of Qazvin and then marched onto Tehran.

During his march to Tehran the Russian foreign ministry in Saint Petersburg sent a telegram to the Russian Embassy in Tehran stating: "Please inform His Excellency Sepahdar Azam that if he and his army peacefully march on Tehran and then proceed to the house of Saad al Dowleh, then on the authority of this telegram, Sepahdar Azam and all his relatives and kin will be placed in the protection of the Tsarist government."

Sepahdar Azam (Khalatbari Tonekaboni) wrote back "The Russian government believes I have done all this for my own personal gain. For Iran's freedom and independence and as a Shia Muslim I have to obey Najaf Religious leaders decree to help and support constitutionalist forces."

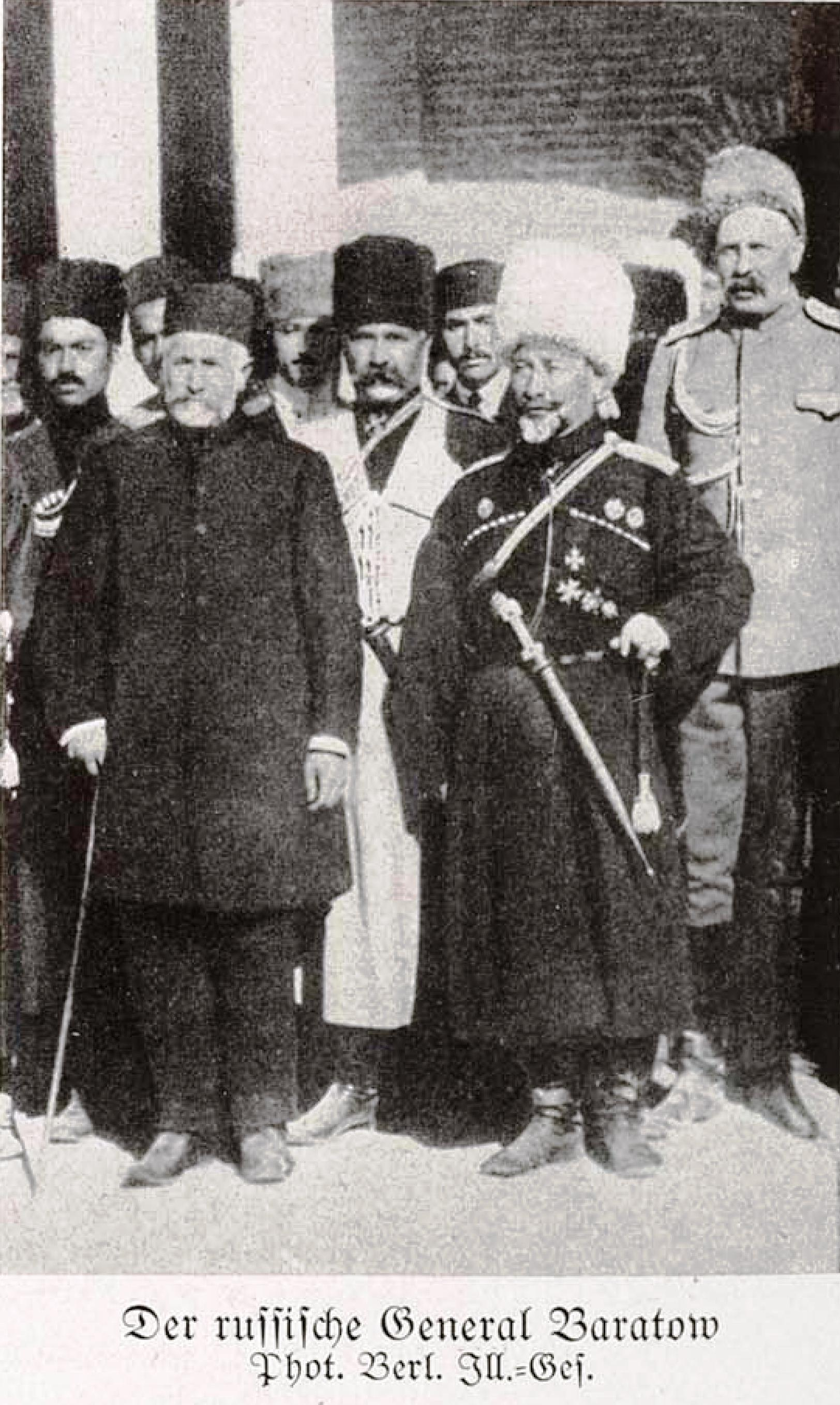
Nikolai Baratov (right) and Mohammad Vali Khan Tonekaboni (left) at the Caucasus front

Rejecting the Tsarist government's request, he continued his march and forced the royalists in Tehran to surrender. Mohammad Ali Shah fled and sought refuge in the Russian embassy, then left Iran altogether. He accepted the title of Sepahsalar (Commander in Chief). Sepahsalar-e Khalatbari Tonekaboni became Minister of Defence in the first constitutionalist government that followed the dethroning of Mohammad Ali Shah in 1909. He subsequently became Prime Minister of Iran four times. As the largest property owner in Iran, his noble "Khan" status allowed him to rule several fiefdoms in Gilan and Mazandaran provinces, including the city and regions surrounding Tonekabon.

Sepahsalar Khalatbari Tonekaboni continued to fight the religious clerics' attempts to create a theocracy as well as the ruling establishments attempts to continue a monarchy. He took frequent trips to France to learn the French system of representative democracy.

With the advent of the Pahlavi era and Reza Khan, imposed by the British in the 1920s, Sepahsalar Khalatbari Tonekaboni was placed under increased political pressure. Much of his property was seized by the new government in an attempt to control his wealth and his power. His favorite son, Colonel Ali Asghar Khan, was killed suspiciously in Lashkarak Hunting-ground.

On 16 July 1926, Sepahsalar Khalatbari Tonekaboni committed suicide. His last note, written to his eldest son Amir Asad, read: "Amir Asad, right away take my body to the shrine for cleansing and burial next to my son Saad al Dowleh. Do it now. For after living eighty years no mourning or tears are needed for me."

== See also ==
- Sardar As'ad Bakhtiari
- Bagh-e Ferdows

== Sources ==
- Cyrus Ghani: Iran and the rise of Reza Shah. From Qajar collapse to Pahlavi rule. I. B. Tauris, London u. a. 1998, ISBN 1-86064-258-6, S. 78.

Political offices
Preceded by Javad Sa'd al-Dowleh	Prime Minister of Iran; 1909–1910	Succeeded by Mostowfi ol-Mamalek
Preceded by Mostowfi ol-Mamalek	Prime Minister of Iran; 1911	Succeeded by Najaf-Qoli Samsam al-Saltaneh
Preceded by Abdol-Hossein Farmanfarma	Prime Minister of Iran; 1916	Succeeded by Vosough od-Dowleh
