= Najaf-Qoli Khan Bakhtiari =

11th Prime Minister of Iran

Saad al-Dowleh سعدالدوله
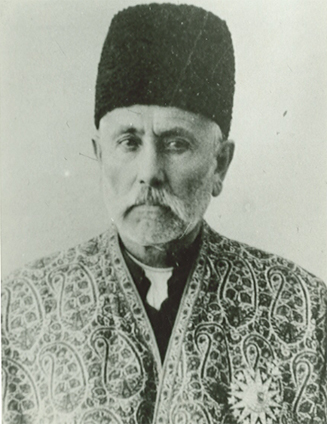

7th Prime Minister of Iran
- In office 1911 – 17 January 1913
- Monarch: Ahmad Shah Qajar
- Preceded by: Sepahsalar-e Tonekaboni
- Succeeded by: Mohammad Ali Ala al-Saltaneh
- In office 1 May 1918 – 8 August 1918
- Monarch: Ahmad Shah Qajar
- Preceded by: Mostowfi ol-Mamalek
- Succeeded by: Vosugh od-Dowleh

Personal details
- Born: 1846 Chaharmahal province, Sublime State of Iran
- Died: 1930 (aged 83–84) Isfahan, Imperial State of Iran
- Relations: Bibi Maryam Bakhtiari (sister); Ali-Qoli Khan Bakhtiari (brother); Khosrou Khan Bakhtiari Sardar Zafar (brother)
- Parent: Hossein Gholi Khan Ilkhani (father)

Najaf-Qoli Khan Bakhtiari (Persian: نجف‌قلی‌خان بختیاری; 1846–1930) also known as Saad al-Dowleh (سعدالدوله) and Samsam al-Saltaneh (صمصام‌السلطنه), was an Iranian Prime Minister and a leader of the Iranian Constitutional Revolution. He was elected Prime Minister for two terms, first from 3 May 1909 to 16 July 1909 and again from 23 December 1912 to 17 January 1913, when he resigned from the office. He was a representative of Parliament of Iran from Tehran in the 4th Parliament. He was the older brother of Ali-Qoli Khan Bakhtiari, better known as Sardar Assad, Bibi Maryam Bakhtiari and Khosrou Khan Bakhtiari, Sardar Zafar. In 1930, he died in Isfahan.

== Life ==
Najaf Gholi Khan, Samsam al-Saltaneh was the son of Hossein Gholi Khan Ilkhani and Bibi Mehrafrooz, the grandson of Jafar Gholi Khan Duraki and the granddaughter of Shafi Khan Bakhtiari.

After his father's death in 1902 (1281), he received the title of Samsam al-Saltaneh from Mozaffar ad-Din Shah Qajar and, after the death of his older brother Esfandiar, became the Ilkhani Lord Chieftain of the Bakhtiari clan.

Samsam al-Sultaneh threw his weight behind the opponents of Mohammad Ali Shah Qajar in the Constitutional movement and joined his brother Ali Qoli Khan, Sardar Asad, during the Constitutional Revolution. Together with Bakhtiari armed horsemen, he captured Isfahan in 1908 and, for a while, took over the government of Isfahan.

== Prime minister ==
Samsam al-Saltaneh became the Minister of War on 26 July 1911 (1290) during the restoration of the cabinet of Sepehdar General Mohammad Vali Khan Tonekaboni.[2]. When Sepahdar's government fell, Samsam al-Saltaneh became the Prime Minister on 2 August 1911.

His first premiership was turbulent. He was defeated by the loyalist forces of Mohammad Ali Shah, who had re-entered Iran by way of Russia, supported by Russian and Turkmen cavalry. He also had to grapple with the forces of Salar al-Doula – Mohammad Ali Shah's brother – who was leading a rebellion in Kermanshah during this period.

The fall of Samsam al-Saltaneh's cabinet was precipitated by a Russia’s ultimatum which gave the Iranian government 48 hours to dismiss and expel Morgan Shuster, an American financial adviser, as well as his entire staff. The Russians also required that, in the future, the government of Iran should in advance seek the consent of the Russian and British embassies before employing foreign advisors. Finally, the Iranian government was ordered to pay the cost of the Russian deployment in Iran or otherwise the Russian forces – which had stopped in Rasht – would march on Tehran and the Iranians would be billed for the additional cost of this advance. Samsam al-Saltaneh’s cabinet was in favour of accepting Russia's demands, but the National Assembly rejected the ultimatum with an overwhelming majority. The Prime Minister tendered his resignation on 16 July 1909.

Samsam al-Sultaneh became prime minister again in May 1918 (1297) which coincided with the upheaval of the Bolshevik Revolution in Russia. The new Soviet leader, Vladimir Lenin, announced the abolition of all the colonial privileges of the former tsarist government to prove his goodwill towards the weaker nations of the world. Samsam al-Saltaneh took advantage of this opportunity and issued a statement on the 4 August 1918, canceling the 1828 Treaty of Turkmenchay and other privileges granted to Tsarist Russia.

On 8 August 1918, his cabinet passed a resolution cancelling all capitulation clauses, but three days later, Ahmad Shah Qajar summoned Samsam Ol-Saltaneh to the Golestan Palace and severely reprimanded him, ordering him to resign. Samsam al-Saltaneh refused and left the palace in anger. On the same day, Ahmad Shah appointed Vosugh od-Dowleh to form a new cabinet.

He was reported to have been a member of the Moderate Socialists Party but he was favoured by the Democrat Party at the time appointed as the Prime Minister and formed a pro-Democrat cabinet.

== Death ==
During his final years, Samsam al-Saltaneh was elected to represent Tehran in the fourth National Assembly. In 1921, he was declined the offer to become the governor of the troubled Khorasan province.

He was appointed governor of the Bakhtiari region in 1929, by Reza Shah – the first Pahlavi monarch – and a year later, in 1930, died in Isfahan and was buried in Takht-e Foulad in the Mausoleum of the Bakhtiari family.

Political offices
Preceded by Mohammad Vali Khan Tonekaboni	Prime Minister of Iran; 1911–1913	Succeeded by Mohammad Ali Ala al-Saltaneh
Preceded by Mostowfi ol-Mamalek	Prime Minister of Iran; 1918	Succeeded by Vossug ed Dowleh
