= Persian Constitutional Revolution =

1905–1911 Iranian uprising against absolute monarchy

- Part of constitutionalization attempts in Iran
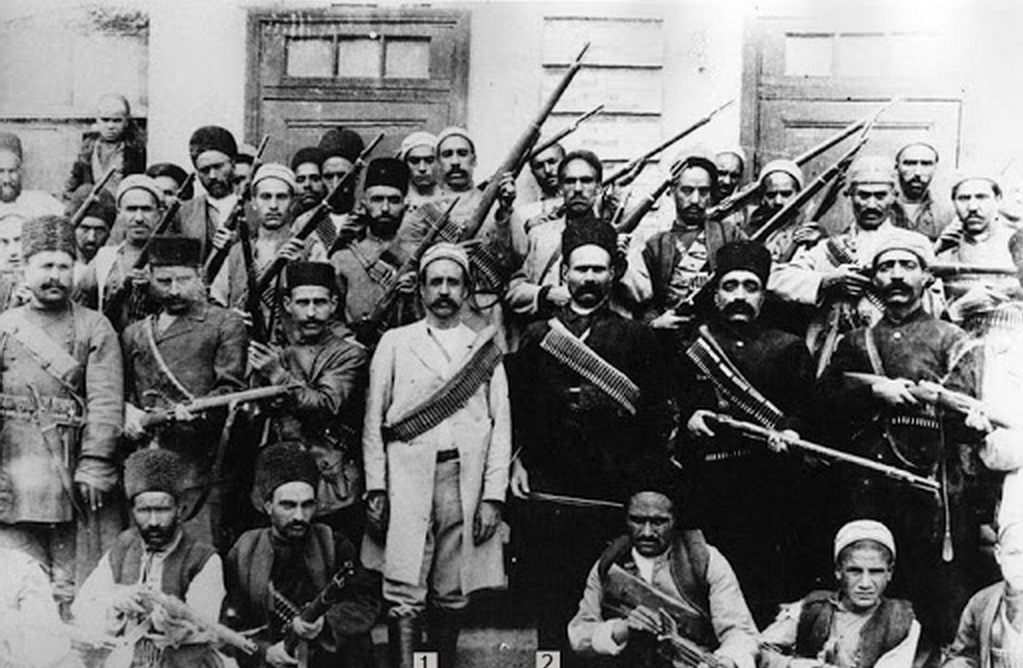
- Revolutionary fighters in Tabriz; Sattar Khan and Baqir Khan are in the center.
- Date: 1905–1911
- Location: Iran
- Result: Revolutionaries victory: Persian Constitution of 1906 promulgated; Constitutional monarchy and Parliament instituted; Triumph of Tehran

Parties
Revolution: June 1905 – August 1906 Revolutionaries
- Secret Center
- Social Democratic Party
- Society of Humanity
- Revolutionary Committee
- Secret Society
Semi-organized groups:
- Ulama and seminary students
- Committee of Merchants
- Committee of Guild Elders
- Students of Dar ul-Funun, School of Political Science and School of Agriculture
Civil war: August 1906 – July 1909
Parliament
- Tabriz Council
- Society of Azerbaijanis
- Central Society
- Dashnak
- Society of Guilds
- Society of College Graduates
Qajar dynasty
- Nazmiyeh
- (Russian Empire) Cossack Brigade
Qajar dynasty
- Russian Empire
- (Russian Empire) Cossack Brigade
- Shahsevans

Lead figures
Mohammad Tabatabai; Seyyed Abdollah Behbahani; Muhammad Hossein Naini; Haydar Khan Amo-oghli Tariverdi; Sattar Khan (WIA); Baqir Khan; Yeprem Khan; Ali-Qoli Khan Bakhtiari; Najaf-Qoli Khan Bakhtiari; Mohammad Vali Khan Tonekaboni	Mozaffar ad-Din Shah (surrendered); Mohammad Ali Shah (surrendered); Salar od-Dowleh (surrendered); Rahimkhan Chalabianloo (surrendered); Mohammad Ali Khan Sardar-e Afkham †; (Russian Empire) Vladimir Liakhov (WIA); (Russian Empire) Illarion Vorontsov-Dashkov; (Russian Empire) Nikolai Yudenich

The Persian Constitutional Revolution (Persian: مشروطیت, romanized: Mašrutiat, or انقلاب مشروطه Enqelâb-e Mašrute), also known as the Constitutional Revolution of Iran, took place between 1905 and 1911 during the Qajar era. The revolution led to the establishment of a parliament in Iran (Persia), and has been called an "epoch-making episode in the modern history of Persia".

The revolution was "the first of its kind in the Islamic world, earlier than the revolution of the Young Turks in 1908". It opened the way for the modern era in Iran, and debate in a burgeoning press. Many groups fought to shape the course of the revolution. The old order, which Naser al-Din Shah Qajar had struggled for so long to sustain, was finally replaced by new institutions.

Mozaffar ad-Din Shah Qajar signed the 1906 constitution shortly before his death. He was succeeded by Mohammad Ali Shah Qajar, who abolished the constitution and bombarded the parliament in 1908 with Russian and British support. This led to a second effort when constitutionalist forces marched to Tehran, forced Mohammad Ali Shah Qajar's abdication in favour of his young son, Ahmad Shah Qajar, and re-established the constitution in 1909.

The revolution ended in December 1911 when the Shah's ministers oversaw the expulsion of the deputies of the Second Majlis from the parliament "with the support of 12,000 Russian troops".

After the 1921 Persian coup d'état (Persian: کودتای ۳ اسفند ۱۲۹۹), Iran's parliament amended the constitution on 12 December 1925, replacing the 1797–1925 Qajar dynasty with the Pahlavi dynasty as the legitimate sovereigns of Iran. The 1906–1907 constitution, though not adhered to, remained until after the Islamic Revolution, when a new constitution was approved in a referendum on 2 and 3 December 1979, establishing an Islamic republic.

== History ==
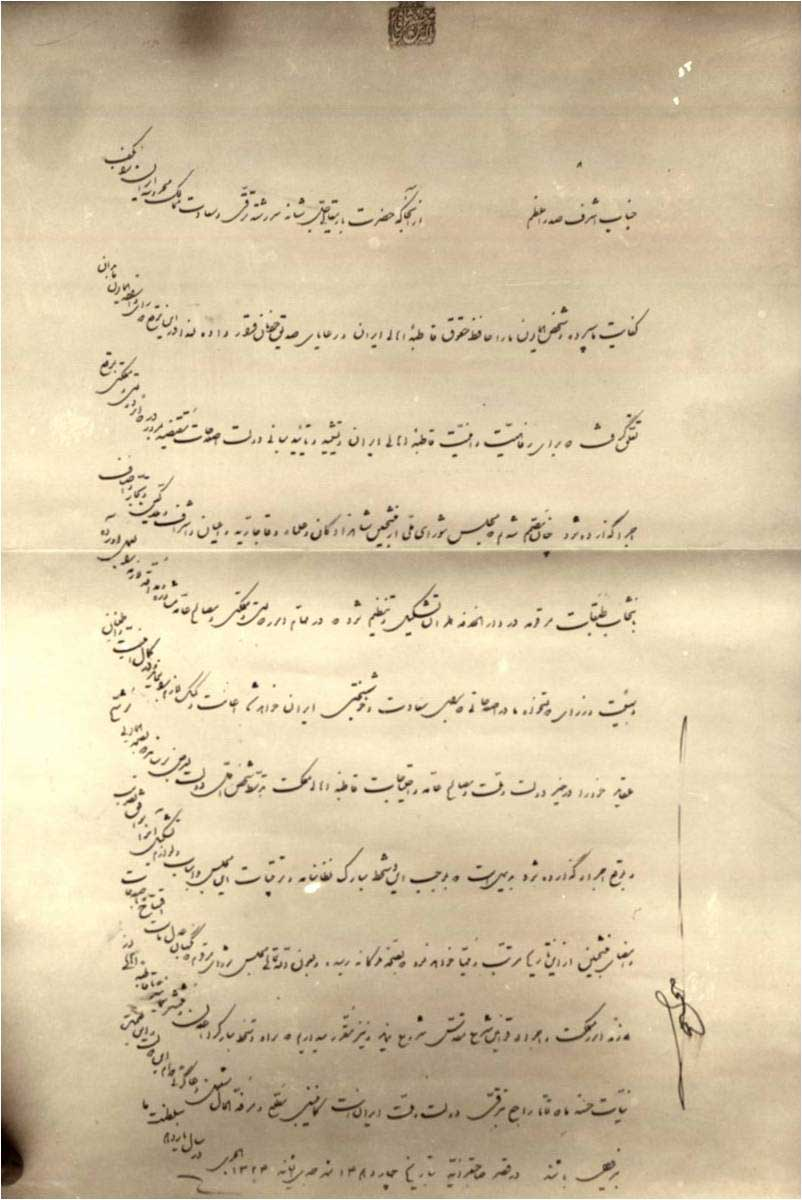
Royal proclamation by Mozaffar ad-Din Shah Qajar which established the constitutional monarchy on 5 August 1906

The Constitutional Revolution began in 1905 with protest against a foreign director of customs (a Belgian) enforcing "with bureaucratic rigidity" the tariff collections to pay for a loan to another foreign source (Russians) that financed Mozaffar ad-Din Shah Qajar's extravagant tour of Europe. The revolutionaries – bazaari, ulama, radicals – argued that Iran's oil industry was being sold to the British, while tax breaks on imports, exports and manufactured textiles were destroying Iran's economy (which was sustained by the bazaar merchants), and that the shah was selling assets to pay interest on the fortune in foreign debt he had accumulated.

It ended in December 1911 when deputies of the Second Majlis, suffering from "internal dissension, apathy of the masses, antagonisms from the upper class, and open enmity from Britain and Russia", were "roughly" expelled from the Majlis and threatened with death if they returned by "the shah's cabinet, backed by 12,000 Russian troops".

In between there were two different majles (parliaments), a deposed shah and a 1907 division of the country by Britain and Russia capitalizing on Iran's weak government. A new fundamental law created a parliament, giving it final approval of all loans and the budget. The majles was endorsed by the leading clerics of Najaf – Akhund Khurasani, Mirza Husayn Tehrani and Shaykh Abdullah Mazandarani.

=== Background ===
In the late 19th century, like most of the Muslim world, Iran suffered from foreign intrusion and exploitation, military weakness, lack of cohesion, and corruption.

In the 1813 Treaty of Gulistan and the 1828 Treaty of Turkmenchay, Iran lost "Georgia, Armenia, and their Caspian navy" to Russia, "gave up its claims to Afghanistan, and paid an indemnity of three million pounds to the tsar". In the Treaty of Paris (1857), it agreed to withdraw from Herat (formerly part of Iran) and signed a commercial treaty with Britain. The lack of a standing Iranian army was part of the problem because the forces that were raised to fight the Russians (for example) were "faction-ridden tribal contingents" and lacked modern artillery.

To compensate for his lack of an army, the Qajar Shah would use loyal tribes, putting down a rebellion by declaring a rebellious city or region open booty for the tribe, who would then appear to rape and pillage – a far more destructive means of discipline than arresting and punishing rebels. Major roads between cities that might have appeared to be investments in improving transportation, provided opportunities not for greater trade and prosperity, but for tax collectors to fleece towns along the road, and thus "encouraged the local peasants to settle in more distant regions". A survey for the British Foreign Office reported:

'There are large tracts of fertile land which remain waste owing to their proximity to the main roads, as no village having cultivators on such spots can possibly prosper or enjoy the least immunity from the pestering visits of Government officials, and thefts and robberies committed by the tribes.'

Perhaps worst of all the indignities Iran suffered from the superior militaries of European powers were "a series of commercial capitulations." While the sales by the shah of titles, patents, privileges, concessions, monopolies, lands, ... high offices" paid for some improvements, such as a telegraph network and in Tehran a regular police force, a municipal civil service, etc., they were also spent on consumption by the shah's court.

Under the Qajar dynasty (1789–1925), foreign (Western) mass-manufactured products, "especially textiles, undermined the traditional handicrafts, and consequently presented for many bazaars a mutual enemy – the foreigner." In Isfahan at least, 10% of "the guilds in this city were weavers; not even 1/5 of those survived" competition from imported textiles. Widows and orphans were hurt, and farmers suffered: by 1894 the price they were paid for wheat harvest dropped to 1/6 what it had been in 1871; irrigation systems had fallen into ruin, "turning fields and villages into desert".

In 1872, Naser al-Din Shah negotiated a concession granting a British citizen control over Iranian roads, telegraphs, mills, factories, extraction of resources, and other public works in exchange for a fixed sum and 60% of net revenue. This concession was rolled back after bitter local opposition. Other concessions to the British included giving the new Imperial Bank of Persia exclusive rights to issue banknotes, and opening up the Karun River to navigation.

Nikki Keddie has pointed out that

The Russo-Japanese War of 1904–05 and the Russian revolution of 1905 gave impetus to an Iranian opposition movement that had been growing since 1901. After a century of successive defeats, an Asian power had defeated a European power, an event that bolstered pride throughout Asia. This feeling was particularly strong in those countries, like Iran, that had experienced Russian penetration and oppression. Many considered it significant that the only Asian power with a constitution had defeated the only Western power without one, and constitutions came to be looked upon as the "secret of strength" of Western governments.

==== Discontented groups ====
The political base of the constitutionalist movement to control the power of the shah was an alliance of the ulama, liberal and radical intellectuals, and the bazaar. But the alliance was based on common enemies rather than common goals. The ulama sought "to extend their own power and to have Shi'i Islam more strictly enforced"; the liberals and radicals desired "greater political and social democracy and economic development"; and the bazaaris "to restrict favored foreign economic status and competition".

The intellectuals were a "small but growing" group, many of whom learned of Western ways while travelling abroad and "were generally struck by Western economic development, comparative justice, and lack of arbitrary rule". In their writings these intellectuals criticized Iran's "autocratic rulers, petty officials, venal clerics, and arbitrary courts, and of the low status of women." The "mercantile class" or bazaari became convinced that "law and order, security of property, and immunity from arbitrary power could all be achieved by importing parliamentary democracy" from Europe. The ulama (i.e. Islamic scholars) had less to gain and a less direct incentive to support a constitution, but were convinced (at least for a time) that their "hierocracy vis-a-vis the monarchy" would not be weakened.

==== Tobacco protest ====
The tobacco protest of February 1891–January 1892 was "the first mass nationwide popular movement in Iran", and described as a "dress rehearsal for the...Constitutional Revolution", formed from an anti-imperialist and antimonarchist coalition of "clerics, mercantile interests, and dissident intellectuals".

In March 1890, Naser al-Din Shah granted a concession to an Englishman, Baron Paul Julius Reuter, for a 50-year monopoly over the distribution and exportation of tobacco in exchange for £25,000 to the Shah personally and £15,000 a year to the state. Iranians cultivated a variety of tobacco "much prized in foreign markets" that was not grown elsewhere, and the arrangement threatened the job security of a significant portion of the Iranian population – hundreds of thousands of workers in agriculture and the bazaars.

This led to unprecedented nationwide protest erupting first among the bazaari, and then the ulama. In December 1891, the most important religious authority in Iran, marja'-e taqlid Mirza Hasan Shirazi, issued a fatwa declaring the use of tobacco to be tantamount to war against the Hidden Imam, using the strongest possible language to oppose the Régie (tobacco monopoly). Bazaars shut down, and Iranians stopped smoking tobacco, despite the popularity of tobacco – which Iranians were said to be less likely to forego than bread – the religious ban was so successful that it was said that women in the shah's harem quit smoking.

The protest demonstrated to the Iranians "for the first time that it was possible to win out against the Shah and foreign interests… there is a direct line from the coalition which participated in the tobacco movement… culminating in the Constitutional Revolution" and arguably the Iranian Revolution as well, according to Historian Nikki Keddie.

==== Mozaffar ad-Din Shah Qajar ====
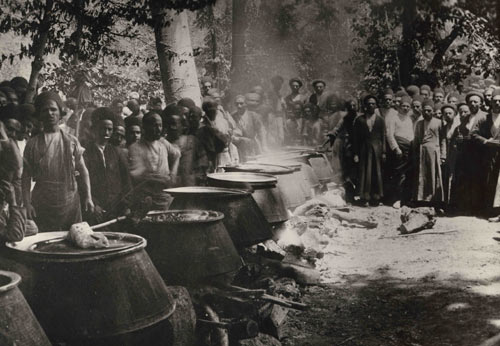
Sanctuary at the British Embassy, 1906

The fourth Qajar monarch, Naser al-Din Shah, was assassinated on 1 May 1896 by Mirza Reza Kermani, a follower of Jamāl al-Dīn al-Afghānī, when he was visiting and praying in the Shah Abdol-Azim Shrine. At Mozaffar al-Din Shah's accession Iran faced a financial crisis, with annual governmental expenditures far in excess of revenues as a result of the policies of his father. Mozaffar ad-Din Shah signed the 1906 constitution shortly before he died on 8 January 1907. Weakness and extravagance continued during the reign of Mozaffar ad-Din Shah (1896–1907), who often relied on his chancellor to manage his decentralized state. His dire financial straits caused him to sign many concessions to foreign powers on trade items ranging from weapons to tobacco. The aristocracy, religious authorities, and educated elite began demanding a curb on royal authority and the establishment of the rule of law as their concern about foreign (especially Russian) influence grew. The Qajars had taken large loans from Russia and Britain to pay for the Shah's extravagant lifestyle and the cost of the government; the shah financed a royal tour of Europe in 1900 by borrowing ₽22 million from Russia, using Iranian customs receipts as collateral.

=== First protests ===
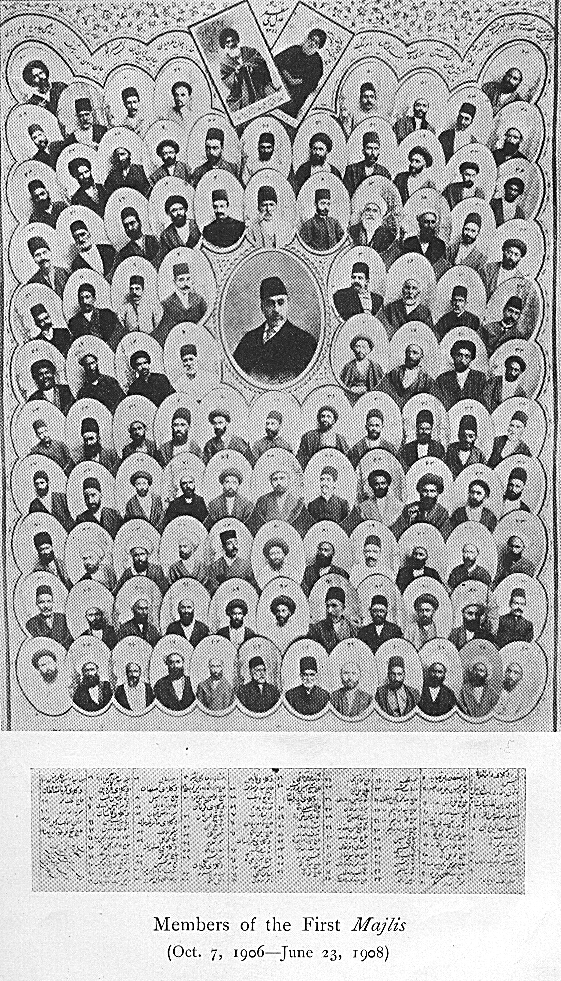
The first Majlis (7 October 1906 – 23 June 1908); chairman Mortezā Qoli Khan Sani od-Dauleh, who had been finance minister for seven months when he was assassinated on 6 February 1911 by two Georgians in Tehran, is in the center.

In 1905, protests erupted about the imposition of Iranian tariffs to repay the Russian loan for Mozaffar ad-Din Shah's royal tour. In December of that year, two merchants in Tehran were bastinadoed for price-gouging. The city's merchants rebelled, closing its bazaar. The clergy followed suit as a result of the alliance formed during the Tobacco Protest. The two protesting groups sought sanctuary in a Tehran mosque, but the government entered the mosque and dispersed them. The dispersal triggered a larger movement that sought refuge at a shrine outside Tehran. The shah yielded to the demonstrators on January 12, 1906, agreeing to dismiss his prime minister and transfer power to a "house of justice" (forerunner of the Iranian parliament). The basti protesters returned from the shrine in triumph, riding royal carriages and hailed by a jubilant crowd.

During a fight in early 1906, government forces killed a sayyid (a descendant of Muhammad). In a skirmish shortly afterwards, Cossacks killed 22 protesters and injured 100. The bazaar again closed and the ulama went on strike, a large number taking sanctuary in the holy city of Qom. Many merchants went to the British embassy in Tehran, which agreed to shelter the basti on the grounds of the embassy.

=== Creation of the constitution ===
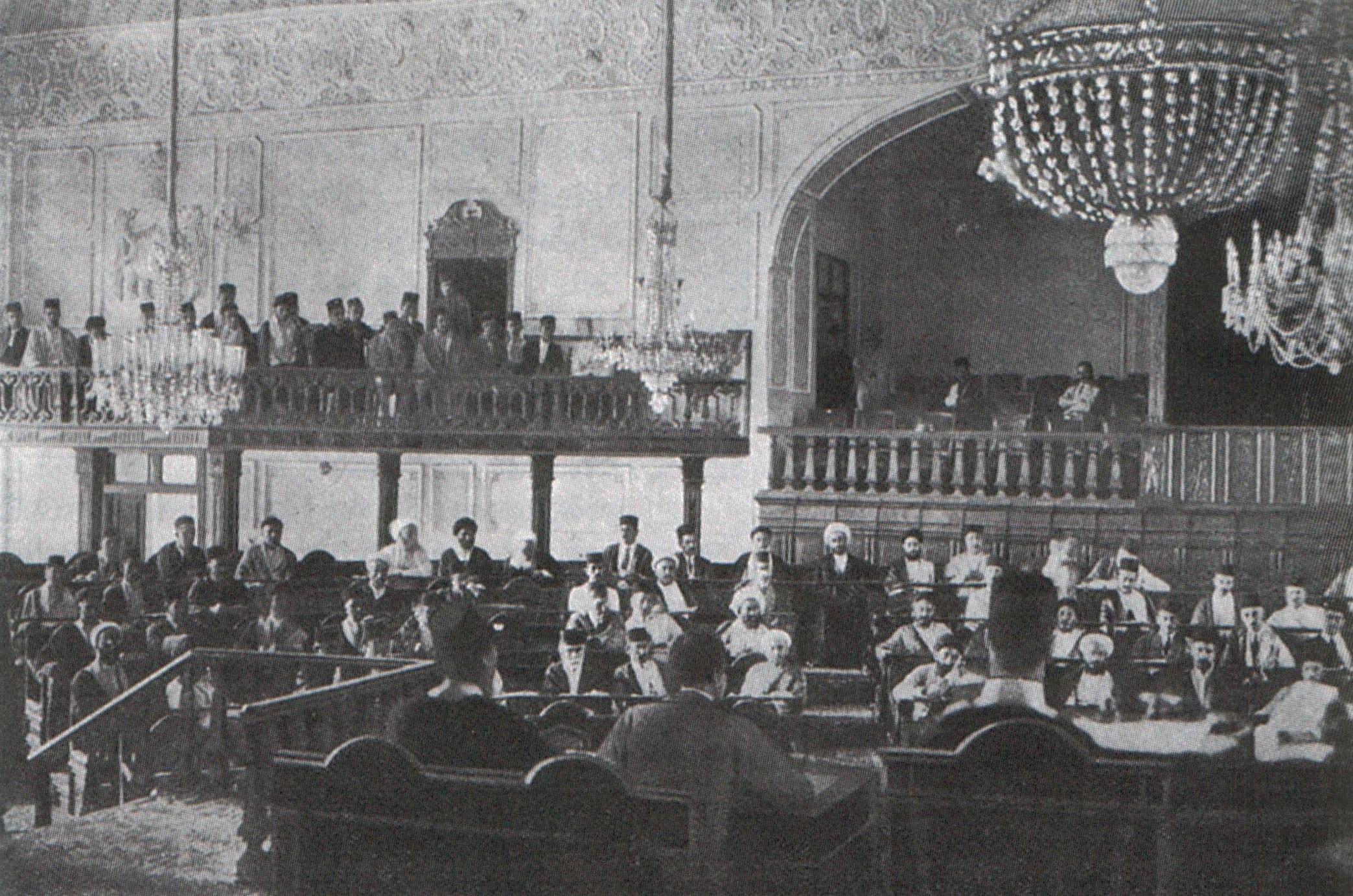
Parliament in 1906

During the summer of 1906, about 12,000 men camped in the gardens of the British embassy in what has been called a "vast open-air school of political science". Demand for a parliament (majlis) began, with the goal of limiting the power of the shah. Mozaffar ad-Din Shah agreed on a parliament in August 1906, and the first elections were held that fall. One hundred fifty-six members were elected, the overwhelming majority from Tehran and the merchant class.

The National Consultative Assembly first met in October 1906. The shah was old and frail, and attending the inauguration of parliament was one of his last official acts. Mozaffar ad-Din Shah's son, Mohammad Ali Shah Qajar, was unsympathetic to constitutionalism; the shah signed the constitution (modeled on the Belgian constitution) by 31 December 1906, making his power contingent on the will of the people, and died three days later.

==== The constitution ====
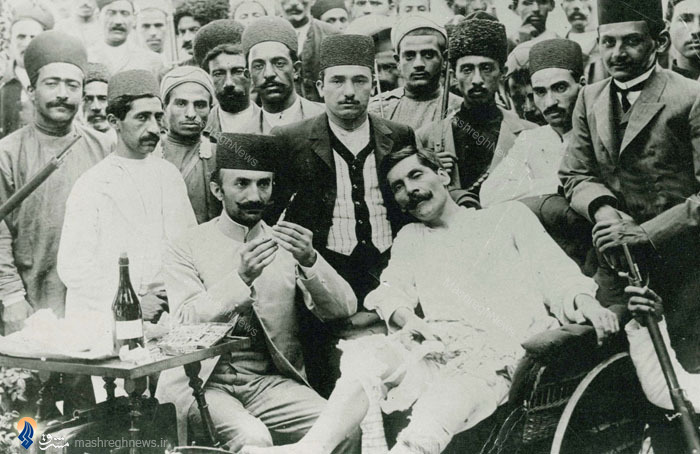
Amir Khan Amir al-Alam treats an injured man after the Triumph of Tehran

The constitution itself was created by the royal proclamation on 5 August 1906 by Mozaffar ad-Din Shah on "for the peace and tranquility of all the people of Persia." The Quran was the foundation of this constitution while the Belgian constitution served as a partial model for the document.

The electoral law of 9 September 1906 defined the regulations for the Elections to the Majlis. No women, foreigners, men under 25, "persons notorious for mischievous opinions," those with a criminal record, active military personnel, etc. were allowed to vote. Members of the parliament were required to be fully literate in Persian, "Iranian subjects of Iranian extraction," "locally known," "not be in government employment," between the ages of 30 and 70, and "have some insight into affairs of State."

The fundamental laws of 30 December 1906 defined the role of the Majlis as a bicameral legislature: the National Consultative Assembly was to be based "on justice." and there was to be "another Assembly, entitled the Senate." The Constitutional Amendment of 1907 declared Twelver Shi'ism to be the state religion, and called for a council of five high ranking Twelver Shia clerics to ensure that the laws passed by the parliament were not against the laws of Islam.

=== Mohammad Ali Shah Qajar ===
Mohammad Ali Shah Qajar, the sixth Qajar shah, came to power in January 1907. He opposed the constitution. The British switched their support to the shah, abandoning the constitutionalists. In August of that year, taking advantage of Iran's weakness, the Anglo-Russian Convention was signed, dividing Iran into a Russian zone in the north and a British zone in the south; the center of the country was neutral.

=== The Minor Tyranny and the civil war of 1908–1909 ===
In 1908, the shah moved to "exploit the divisions within the ranks of the reformers" and eliminate the majlis, staging a coup d'état and creating a period in Iranian history called the Minor Tyranny. It was at this point that Fazlollah Nori defected from the constitutionalists, helping the shah kill some revolutionaries and bomb the parliament.

Iran tried to remain free of Russian influence through resistance (via the majlis) to the shah's policies. Parliament appointed American lawyer William Morgan Shuster as Iran's treasurer-general. In response, Russia issued an ultimatum to expel Shuster and suspend the parliament, occupying Tabriz.

After shelling the Majles (parliament) of Iran in the capital Tehran, 40,000 of Mohammad Ali Shah Qajar's soldiers were ordered to attack Tabriz, where Constitutional rebels were holding out. Sattar Khan was appointed the commander in chief of High Council, i.e. commander of the constitutionalist forces. By April 1909, the Tabriz rebels had lost large numbers of fighters, but succeeded in driving out royalist forces from the city, and Sattar Khan and his lieutenant Bagher Khan had distinguished themselves as heroes. Inspired by this victory, constitutionalists across Iran set up special committees in Tehran, Rasht, Qazvin, Isfahan and other cities, and the powerful Bakhtiyari tribal leaders threw their support to the Tabriz rebels. Constitutionalist forces marched to Tehran, forced Mohammad Ali Shah Qajar's abdication in favor of his young son Ahmad Shah Qajar, and re-established the constitution in 1909.

A further split in the revolutionary movement occurred in 1910 when "a group of guerrilla fighters headed by Sattar Khan, refused to obey a government order to disarm." After a "brief but violent confrontation" in which Sattar Khan was wounded, Yeprem Khan, the recently appointed police chief of Tehran "succeeded in disarming them".

=== The end ===
The revolution ended in December 1911 when deputies of the Second Majlis, suffering from "internal dissension, apathy of the masses, antagonisms from the upper class, and open enmity from Britain and Russia", were "roughly" expelled from the Majlis and threatened with death if they returned by "the shah's cabinet, backed by 12,000 Russian troops".

== Religious debate ==
The 1891 fatwa by Mirza Hasan Shirazi that effectively shut down tobacco use in Iran and reversed the monopoly agreement on tobacco, showed the enormous influence of the Usuli Twelver Shi'i clergy among the Iranian people that went beyond issues directly involved with religion. (Usuli Shi'i consider it obligatory for a Muslim not trained in the religious sciences to obey a mujtahid, i.e. a marja', when seeking to determine Islamically correct behavior.) After this debacle, the new Shah, Mohammad Ali Qajar, understood that he could not use royal prestige and tradition to fight constitutional government. Instead, he would find religious allies.

There were clergy on both sides of the dispute. On the side of constitutional government were three of the highest level clerics (marja') at the time – Akhund Khurasani, Mirza Husayn Tehrani and Shaykh Abdullah Mazandarani – who telegraphed fatwa in favor of the constitution from their schools in Najaf, Iraq; of the three, Muhammad Kazim Khurasani, (aka Akhund Khurasani) was the most involved in the issue, he and his student Muhammad Hossain Naini argued that while complete justice was impossible until the return of the Hidden Imam, "human experience and careful reflection" shows "that democracy reduces the tyranny of state" making it a "lesser evil" in governance and something Shi'i must support until the return of the Imam; also supporting constitutionalism was Mirza Ali Aqa Tabrizi, who argued that only the sources of emulation (highest level clerics) should be heeded when it comes to matters of faith.

The leader of those opposing constitutional government was Fazlullah Nouri. Other opponents included Mullah Qurban Ali Zanjani. Nouri maintained that sharia was a complete code of life, not just for religious ritual, and any other codes were both unnecessary and against Islam. Although he ranked below Marja' religious leaders, he told Shi'i Muslims to ignore the Marja' they followed if that marja' supported democracy.

=== Important events ===
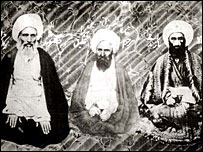
The trio: (left to right) Akhund Khurasani, Mirza Husayn Tehrani and Abdullah Mazandarani

Early fatwa by marja'

After the parliament was formed, its members stayed in touch with Akhund Khurasani. Whenever legislative bills were discussed, he was telegraphed with the details for a juristic opinion. In a letter dated 3 June 1907, the parliament told Akhund about a group of anti-constitutionalists who were trying to undermine legitimacy of democracy in the name of religious law. Akhund Khurasani and the other two members of the trio (Mirza Husayn Tehrani and Shaykh Abdullah Mazandarani) replied:

Persian	English
اساس این مجلس محترم مقدس بر امور مذکور مبتنی است. بر هر مسلمی سعی و اهتمام در استحکام و تشیید این اساس قویم لازم، و اقدام در موجبات اختلال آن محاده و معانده با صاحب شریعت مطهره علی الصادع بها و آله الطاهرین افضل الصلاه و السلام، و خیانت به دولت قوی شوکت است. الاحقر نجل المرحوم الحاج میرزا خلیل قدس سره محمد حسین، حررّہ الاحقر الجانی محمد کاظم الخراسانی، من الاحقر عبدالله المازندرانی	"Because we are aware of the intended reasons for this institution, it is therefore incumbent on every Muslim to support its foundation, and those who try to defeat it, and their action against it, are considered contrary to shari'a." —Mirza Husayn Tehrani, Muhammad Kazim Khurasani, Abdallah Mazandaran.

Fazlollah Nouri and the anti-constitutionalists

At the beginning of the constitutional movement, Sheikh Fazlullah Nouri made speeches and distributed tracts in support of the sources of emulation (Shi'i marja' religious leadership) in Najaf and their position on constitutionalism. They all agreed that the people must counter autocracy and injustice with a constitution that limited the powers of the state and a legislature that represented the country. However, when monarch Mohammad Ali Shah Qajar made clear his desire to roll back democracy and reestablish his authority by military and foreign support (in 1908), Shaikh Fazlullah reversed his position and sided with the shah and his court.

As a rich and high-ranking Qajar court official responsible for conducting marriages and contracts, handling the wills of wealthy men and collected religious funds, Nouri had a powerful vested interest in maintaining the status quo of Iran's political structure. His professions of opposition to foreign influence were also put in question by a number of actions – his close connection to the Russians, his refusal to support the early bazaari protests against the Europeans in collecting customs dues, his endorsement of the sale of a cemetery to Russians for the construction of a (Russian) bank, leading to the unplanned exhuming of bodies, and the financing of an anti-constitutionalist rally with funds from that Russian bank.

In his fight against the institution of parliament, he led a large group of followers and began a round-the-clock sit-in in the Shah Abdol-Azim Shrine on 21 June 1907 which lasted till 16 September 1907.

The anti-democracy clerics incited violence and one such cleric said that getting in the proximity of the parliament was a bigger sin than adultery, robbery and murder. In Zanjan, Mulla Qurban Ali Zanjani mobilized a force of six hundred thugs who looted shops of pro-democracy merchants, took hold of the city for several days, and killed the representative Sa'd al-Saltanih. Nouri himself recruited mercenaries from criminal gangs to harass supporters of democracy. On 22 December 1907, Nouri led a mob towards Toopkhaneh Square and attacked merchants and looted stores. Nouri's ties to the court of the shah and landlords reinforced his fanaticism. He even contacted the Russian embassy for support and his men delivered sermons against democracy in mosques, resulting in chaos.

Fatwas for the Constitution

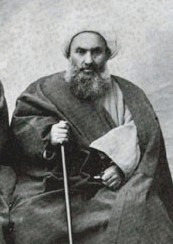
Sheikh Fazlollah Nouri (d. 1909), a cleric who supported the coup d'état of Mohammad Ali Shah Qajar in 1908. He was hanged by the constitutional revolutionaries on 31 July 1909 (in Toopkhaneh) as a traitor.

Notified about Nouri's activities, Akhund Khurasani consulted the other Marja' and in a letter dated 30 December 1907, they issued a statement:

Persian	English
چون نوری مخل آسائش و مفسد است، تصرفش در امور حرام است. محمد حسین (نجل) میرزا خلیل، محمد کاظم خراسانی، عبدالله مازندرانی	"Because Nouri is causing trouble and sedition, his interfering in any affair is forbidden." —Mirza Husayn Tehrani, Muhammad Kazim Khurasani, Abdallah Mazandaran.

However, Nouri continued his activities and a few weeks later Akhund Khurasani and his fellow Marja's argued for his expulsion from Tehran:

Persian	English
رفع اغتشاشات حادثه و تبعید نوری را عاجلاً اعلام. الداعی محمد حسین نجل المرحوم میرزا خلیل، الداعی محمد کاظم الخراسانی، عبدالله المازندرانی	"Restore peace and expel Nouri as quickly as possible." – Mirza Husayn Tehrani, Muhammad Kazim Khurasani, Abdallah Mazandaran.

=== Leading clerical figures ===
Sheikh Fazlollah Nouri

He argued Islam contained a complete code of life, whereas democracy would allow for "teaching of chemistry, physics and foreign languages", which would cause the spread of atheism. He propagandized against female education claiming girls' schools were brothels. Nouri also opposed freedom of the press, modern ways of governance, allocation of funds for modern industry and equal rights for all citizens irrespective of their religion. He bought a printing press and launched a newspaper of his own, "Ruznamih-i-Shaikh Fazlullah", and published leaflets. He believed that the ruler was accountable to no institution other than God and people had no right to limit the powers or question the conduct of the shah; those who supported democratic form of government were corrupt and apostates from Islam.

Like Islamists later in the 20th century, Nouri preached the idea of sharia as a complete code of social life, not just religious ritual, and any other codes were both unnecessary and against Islam.

Shari'a covers all regulations of government, and specifies all obligations and duties, so the needs of the people of Iran in matters of law are limited to the business of government, which, by reason of universal accidents, has become separated from Shari'a. ... Now the people have thrown out the law of the Prophet and have set up their own law instead.

And if the Marja' religious leader that a Shi'i Muslim followed supported democracy, that Muslim should not:

If a thousand jurists write that this parliament is founded on the command to do good and prohibit evil ... then you are witness that this is not the case and they have erred ... (exactly as if they were to say) this animal is a sheep, and you know it is a dog, you have to say, 'You are mistaken, it is unclean'.

Unlike Islamists, he saw the shah as the "executive of the Islamic government", and a debilitation of the power of the shah as "a derogation of religion".

Three marja'

The three of the highest level clerics (marja') at the time – Akhund Khurasani, Mirza Husayn Tehrani and Shaykh Abdullah Mazandarani – defended the parliament when it came under attack from the cleric of the shah's court, Nouri. They acted as a legitimising force, invoking the Quranic command of 'enjoining good and forbidding wrong' to justify democracy in the period of occultation, and linked opposition to the constitutional movement to 'a war against the Imam of the Age', (essential the worst condemnation possible in Shi'i Islam). In so doing they established a model of religious secularity in government in the absence of Imam, that still prevails in (some) Shi'i seminaries.

Mirza Ali Aqa Tabrizi

Mirza Ali Aqa Tabrizi, the Thiqa tul-islam from Tabriz, opposed Nuri saying that only the opinion of the sources of emulation is worthy of consideration in the matters of faith. He wrote:

He who wins his own soul, protects his religion, is against following his desires and is obedient to the command of his Master; that is the person whom the people should take as their model.

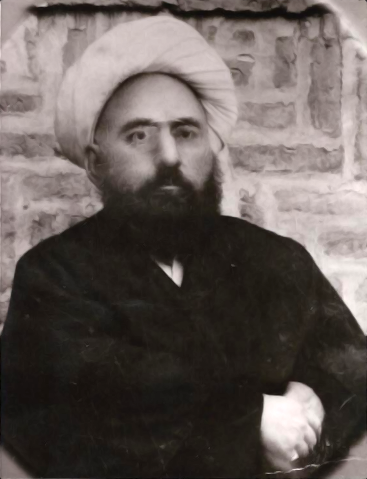
Thiqa tul-Islam Tabrizi (Persian: ثقة الاسلام میرزا علی آقا تبریزی; 19 January 1861 – 31 December 1911)

and

Let us consider the idea that the constitution is against Sharia law: all oppositions of this kind are in vain because the hujjaj al-islam of the atabat, who are today the models (marja') and the refuge (malija) of all Shiites, have issued clear fatwas that uphold the necessity of the Constitution. Aside from their words, they have also shown this by their actions. They see in Constitution the support for splendour of Islam.

He firmly opposed the idea of a supervisory committee of Tehran's clerics censoring the conduct of the parliament, and said that:

this delicate subject shall be submitted to the atabat, … we don't have the right to entrust government to a group of four or five mullahs from Tehran.

Muhammad Kazim Khurasani

Responding to Nouri's arguments Akhund Muhammad Kazim Khurasani replied:

Persian	English
سلطنت مشروعه آن است کہ متصدی امور عامه ی ناس و رتق و فتق کارهای قاطبه ی مسلمین و فیصل کافه ی مهام به دست شخص معصوم و موید و منصوب و منصوص و مأمور مِن الله باشد مانند انبیاء و اولیاء و مثل خلافت امیرالمومنین و ایام ظهور و رجعت حضرت حجت، و اگر حاکم مطلق معصوم نباشد، آن سلطنت غیرمشروعه است، چنان‌ کہ در زمان غیبت است و سلطنت غیرمشروعه دو قسم است، عادله، نظیر مشروطه کہ مباشر امور عامه، عقلا و متدینین باشند و ظالمه و جابره است، مثل آنکه حاکم مطلق یک نفر مطلق‌ العنان خودسر باشد. البته به صریح حکم عقل و به فصیح منصوصات شرع «غیر مشروعه ی عادله» مقدم است بر «غیرمشروعه ی جابره». و به تجربه و تدقیقات صحیحه و غور رسی‌ های شافیه مبرهن شده که نُه عشر تعدیات دوره ی استبداد در دوره ی مشروطیت کمتر می‌شود و دفع افسد و اقبح به فاسد و به قبیح واجب است.	"According to Shia doctrine, only the infallible Imam has the right to govern, to run the affairs of the people, to solve the problems of the Muslim society and to make important decisions. As it was in the time of the prophets or in the time of the caliphate of the commander of the faithful, and as it will be in the time of the reappearance and return of the Mahdi. If the absolute guardianship is not with the infallible then it will be a non-islamic government. Since this is a time of occultation, there can be two types of non-islamic regimes: the first is a just democracy in which the affairs of the people are in the hands of faithful and educated men, and the second is a government of tyranny in which a dictator has absolute powers. Therefore, both in the eyes of the Sharia and reason what is just prevails over the unjust. From human experience and careful reflection it has become clear that democracy reduces the tyranny of state and it is obligatory to give precedence to the lesser evil." —Muhammad Kazim Khurasani

As "sanctioned by sacred law and religion", Akhund believes, a theocratic government can only be formed by the infallible Imam.

Nouri interpreted Sharia as equivalent to and in competition with written constitutions of modern society, unlike Akhund Khurasani who (in addition to being a higher ranking cleric), viewed the adherence to religion in a society as beyond one person or one interpretation.

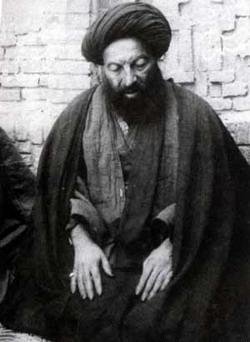
Kazim Yazdi: the apolitical Marja of Najaf at times of democratic revolution

Mohammed Kazem Yazdi

Nouri tried to get support from Mohammed Kazem Yazdi, another prominent Marja of Najaf. Both Mohammad Kazem and Khorasani led a great Shia school in Najaf although they had different views in politics at the same time. While Akhund Khorasani was an eminent Marja' in Najaf, many imitators (followers) prayed behind Kazem Yazdi too, as his lessons on legal rulings (fiqh) were famous. Yazdi was apolitical, holding that Usulism did not offer the liberty to support constitutional politics. In his view, politics was beyond his expertise and therefore he avoided taking part in it. Therefore during the Iranian Constitutional Revolution, he stayed neutral most of the times and seldom issued any political statement.

This did not mean he supported Fazlullah Nouri and Mohammad Ali Shah Qajar. When parliament asked him to review the final draft of constitution, he suggested some changes and signed the document. He said that modern industries were permissible unless explicitly prohibited by Sharia. He also agreed with teaching of modern sciences, and added that the state should not intervene the centers of religious learning (Hawza). He wasn't against formation of organizations and societies that do not create chaos, and in this regard there was no difference between religious and non-religious organizations. In law-making, unlike Nouri, he separated the religious (Sharia) and public law (Urfiya). His opinion was that the personal and family matters should be settled in religious courts by jurists, and the governmental affairs and matters of state should be taken care of by modern judiciary. Parliament added article 71 and 72 into the constitution based on his opinions. Ayatullah Yazdi said that as long as modern constitution did not force people to do what was forbidden by Sharia and refrain from religious duties, there was no reason to oppose democratic rule and the government had the right to prosecute wrongdoers.

Sayyed Moḥammad Ṭabāṭabāʾī

Mirza Sayyed Mohammad Tabatabai was "a well-known figure" and one of "the two most widely recognized clerical leaders of the Revolution" (the other being Sayyed ʿAbd-Allāh Behbahānī). Both were from "old and powerful clerical families" whose authority over the religious community was "beginning to be threatened by rival mojtaheds". Ṭabāṭabāʾī had "demonstrated liberal proclivities since the late period of Nāṣer-al-Dīn Shah". In a "famous letter" to the prime minister at the time, ʿAyn-al-Dawla in 1323/1905, he attacked "opposition to creation of a national assembly (majles-e mellatī)":

The Shiʿite state is confined to Persia, and their [i.e., the Shiʿites'] prestige and prosperity depended upon it. Why have you permitted the ruin of Persia and the utter humiliation of the Shiʿite state? ... You may reply that the mullahs did not allow [Persia to be saved]. This is not credible. ... I can foresee that my country (waṭan), my stature and prestige, my service to Islam are about to fall into the hands of enemies and all my stature gone. As long as I breathe, therefore, I will strive for the preservation of this country, be it at the cost of my life"

=== Nouri's execution and celebration ===
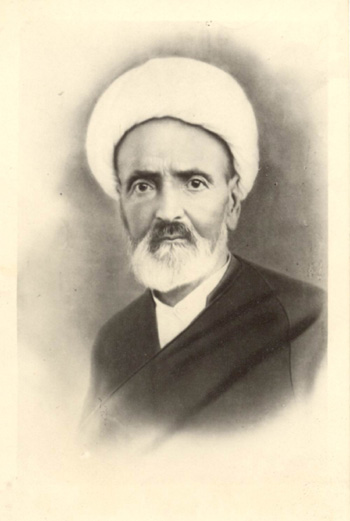
Shaykh Ibrahim Zanjani was head of the tribunal who sentenced Fazlullah Nouri to death.

Nouri allied himself with the new Shah, Mohammad Ali Shah Qajar, who, with the assistance of Russian troops staged a coup against the Majlis (parliament) in 1907. In 1909, however, constitutionalists marched onto Tehran, ending the Minor Tyranny. Nouri was arrested.

The Revolutionary Tribunal declared Nouri guilty of inciting mobs against the constitutionalists and issuing fatwas declaring parliamentary leaders "apostates", "atheists," "secret Freemasons" and koffar al-harbi (warlike pagans) whose blood ought to be shed by the faithful. He was found guilty of "sowing corruption and sedition on earth," and in July 1909, Nouri was hanged as a traitor.

== Legacy ==
The legacy of the revolution in Iran is mixed.

Ayatollah Ruhollah Khomeini, leader of the 1979 Iranian Islamic Revolution, (who was a child at the time of the Constitutional Revolution) and theorized that until the return of the Hidden Imam, Islamic jurists should rule Iran, asserted that decades after the collapse of the revolution, that the constitution of 1906 was the work of (Iranian) agents of imperialist Britain, conspiring against Islam who "were instructed by their masters to take advantage of the idea of constitutionalism in order to deceive the people and conceal the true nature of their political crimes".

At the beginning of the constitutional movement, when people wanted to write laws and draw up a constitution, a copy of the Belgian legal code was borrowed from the Belgian embassy and a handful of individuals (whose names I do not wish to mention here) used it as the basis for the constitution they then wrote, supplementing its deficiencies with borrowings from the French and British legal codes. True, they added some of the ordinances of Islam in order to deceive the people, but the basis of the laws that were now thrust upon the people was alien and borrowed.

After the Iranian revolution, Nouri, as the leader of the Constitutional Revolution's opponents, was celebrated enough in the Islamic Republic to have an expressway named after him. This was despite the fact that Nouri was defending the monarchy against the constitution, and the Islamic Revolution (before Khomeini consolidated power) had been all about the overthrow of Mohammad Reza Shah.

Reza Aslan

Reza Aslan argues that a major lesson of the Revolution is that what separates the "countless uprisings and popular protests" throughout the last hundred-odd years of Iranian history from those in 1906, in 1953 and in 1979 that "ultimately resulted in radical change" is the ability to bring together a coalition of "the educated middle class", the mid-level clerics and the seminary students who "maintain an enormous amount of control and power over the pious masses", and "most crucially, the business class – the merchant class – the bazaari merchants".

== Notable participants ==
=== Constitutionalists ===
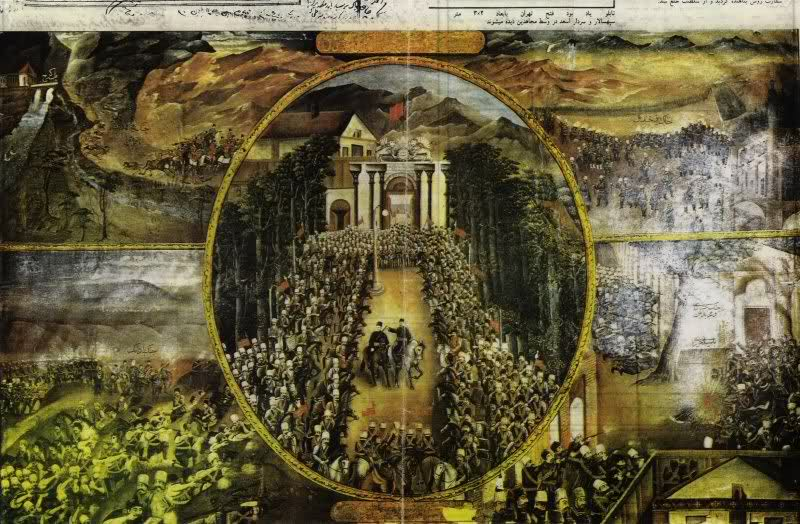
Poster commemorating the July 1909 Triumph of Tehran. The men on horseback are Mohammad Vali Khan Khalatbari Tonekaboni and Sardar Asad.

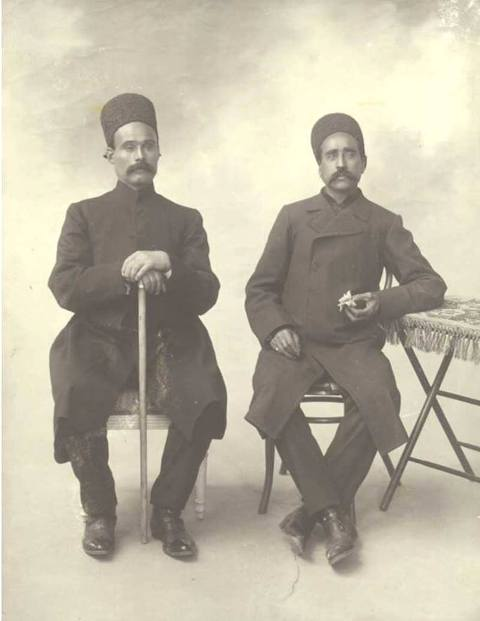
Baqir Khan (left) and Sattar Khan

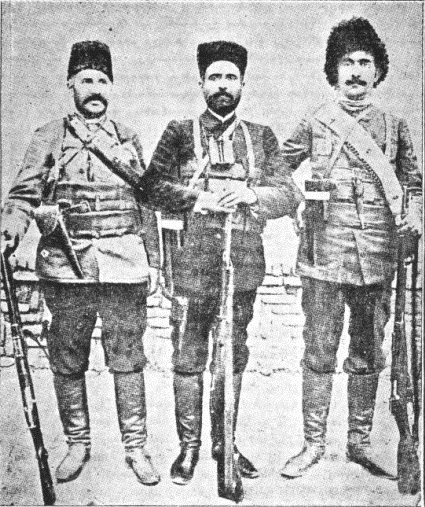
(left to right) Arshak Gafavian, Yeprem Khan, and Khetcho

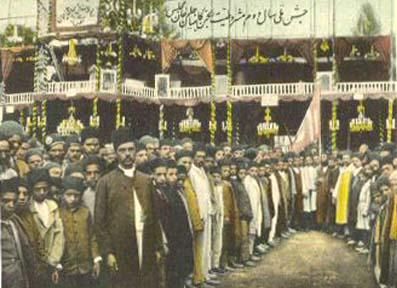
Second anniversary of the revolution

- Mirza Nasrullah Khan – First elected Prime Minister of Iran
- Mirza Jahangir Khan – Founder and editor of the Sur-e Esrafil newspaper
- Mirza Aqa Khan Kermani – Nationalist writer and literary critic
- Mirza Sayyed Mohammad Tabatabai
- Mohamad Vakil Altodjâr Yazdi – Deputy Rasht
- Nikol Duman – Participated in the defense of Tabriz
- Seyed Jamal Vaez
- Hossein Ardabili – Active in Mashhad
- Aref Qazvini
- Stepan Zorian
- Ali-Akbar Dehkhoda
- Mehdi Cont – Activist in Kerman
- Sattar Khan – Revolutionary leader
- Bagher Khan – Sālār-e Melli (national chieftain)
- Mirza Kuchak Khan – Founder of a revolutionary movement based in the forests of Gilan Province
- Mirza Malkom Khan
- Khetcho – Armenian revolutionary leader
- Yeprem Khan – Armenian Iranian revolutionary leader. Wounded Sattar Khan while disarming the revolutionaries in Tehran as commander of Tehran's police force during the interim constitutionalist government.
- Arshak Gafavian – Armenian revolutionary leader
- Sardar Assad – Bakhtiari tribal leader whose forces captured Tehran in 1909
- Bibi Khanoom Astarabadi – Satirist, writer and pioneer of the Iranian women's movement
- Hassan Pirnia
- Heydar Latifiyan
- Ahmad Kasravi
- Amanollah Khan Zia' os-Soltan – Aristocrat and landowner who was accused of a bomb attack on Mohammad Ali Shah Qajar and freed by British troops
- Mohammad-Taqi Bahar
- Sevkaretsi Sako
- Hassan Taqizadeh
- Mirza Abdul'Rahim Talibov Tabrizi – Intellectual and social reformer.
- Abdolhossein Teymourtash
- Abdol-Hossein Farman Farma
- Mohammad Vali Khan Khalatbari Tonekaboni – Leader of revolutionary forces from the northern provinces of Gilan and Mazandaran
- Howard Baskerville – American teacher who fought with the constitutionalists and was killed
- Mohammed Mosaddegh – Liberal nationalist and future prime minister
- Morteza Gholi Khan Hedayat

=== Monarchists (Anti-Constitutionalists) ===
- Abdol Majid Mirza
- Sheikh Fazlollah Nouri – Cleric who was hanged after the revolution
- Vladimir Liakhov – Russian colonel and commander of the Persian Cossack Brigade during the rule of Mohammad Ali Shah Qajar who shelled and besieged Parliament
- Eskandar Khan Davidkhanian – Deputy Commander of the Cossack Brigade
- Alexander Khan Setkhanian – Second in command to Vladimir Liakhov

=== Religious leaders ===
- Mohammad-Kazem Khorasani, constitutionalist
- Sayyed Jamal ad-Din Esfahani, constitutionalist
- Sayyed Abdullah Behbahani, constitutionalist
- Mirza Sayyed Mohammad Tabatabai, constitutionalist
- Mirza Hussein Naini, constitutionalist
- Mohammed Kazem Yazdi, neutral
- Sheikh Fazlollah Nouri, anti-constitutionalist
- Mirza Abutaleb Zanjani, anti-constitutionalist

== See also ==
- Young Turk Revolution
- History of Iran
- History of the Iranian Constitutional Revolution by Ahmad Kasravi
- Intellectual movements in Iran
- Muhammad Kazim Khurasani
- Mirza Husayn Tehrani
- Abdallah Mazandarani
- Mirza Ali Aqa Tabrizi
- Mirza Sayyed Mohammad Tabatabai
- Seyyed Abdollah Behbahani
- Iranian Revolution of 1979
- Tobacco Protest
- Triumph of Tehran
- Secularism in Iran
- Ibn al-Sheikh
- Women in the Iranian Constitutional Revolution
- Bourgeois revolution
- Ottoman invasion of Persia (1906)

== Sources ==
- Abrahamian, Ervand (1982). Iran Between Two Revolutions. Princeton University Press. ISBN 0-691-10134-5.
- Abrahamian, Ervand (1993). Khomeinism: Essays on the Islamic Republic. California: University of California Press. pp. 92–97. ISBN 0520081730.
- Amanat, Abbas (1992). "Constitutional Revolution i. Intellectual background". Encyclopaedia Iranica, Vol. VI, Fasc. 2. pp. 163–176.
- Arjomand, Said Amir (1989). The Turban for the Crown: The Islamic Revolution in Iran. Oxford: Oxford University Press. ISBN 978-0-19-504258-0.
- Bayat, Mangol (1991). Iran's first revolution: Shi'ism and the constitutional revolution of 1905–1909. Studies in Middle Eastern history. Oxford & New York: Oxford University Press. ISBN 978-0-19-506822-1. OCLC 1051306470.
- Farzaneh, Mateo Mohammad (2015). Iranian Constitutional Revolution and the Clerical Leadership of Khurasani. Syracuse, NY: Syracuse University Press. ISBN 978-0-8156-3388-4. OCLC 931494838.
- Hermann, Denis (May 1, 2013). "Akhund Khurasani and the Iranian Constitutional Movement". Middle Eastern Studies. 49 (3): 430–453. doi:10.1080/00263206.2013.783828. ISSN 0026-3206. JSTOR 23471080. S2CID 143672216.
- Kasravi, Ahmad (2003). Tārikh-e Mashruteh-ye Iran تاریخ مشروطهٔ ایران) [History of the Iranian Constitutional Revolution] (in Persian). Tehran: Negāh Publications. ISBN 964-351-138-3. This book is also available in two volumes, published by Amir Kabir Publications in 1984. Amir Kabir's 1961 edition is in one 934-page volume.
- Kasravi, Ahmad (2006). History of the Iranian Constitutional Revolution: Tarikh-e Mashrute-ye Iran. Vol. I. Translated by Evan Siegel. Costa Mesa, California: Mazda Publications. ISBN 1-56859-197-7.
- Keddie, Nikki R. (1966). Religion and Rebellion in Iran: The Tobacco Protest of 1891-1892. Psychology Press. ISBN 978-0-7146-1971-2.
- Lambton, Ann K. S. (1988). Qājār Persia: eleven studies (1st University of Texas Press ed.). Austin: University of Texas Press. ISBN 978-0292769007.
- Mackey, Sandra (1996). The Iranians: Persia, Islam, and the Soul of a Nation. Dutton. ISBN 978-0-525-94005-0.
- Malekzādeh, Mehdi (2004). Tārikh-e Enqelāb-e Mashrutyyat-e Iran تاريخ انقلاب مشروطيت ايران [The History of the Constitutional Revolution of Iran]. Tehran: Sokhan Publications. ISBN 964-372-095-0. In 7 volumes, published in 3 volumes (1697 pp.)
- Martin, V. A. (April 1986). "The Anti-Constitutionalist Arguments of Shaikh Fazlallah Nuri". Middle Eastern Studies. 22 (2): 181–196. doi:10.1080/00263208608700658. JSTOR 4283111.
- Mottahedeh, R. (2014). The Mantle of the Prophet. Oneworld Publications. ISBN 978-1-78074-738-5.
