= Siege of Tabriz (1908–1909) =

Events that took place during the Constitutional Revolution in Tabriz

- Part of Iranian Constitutional Revolution
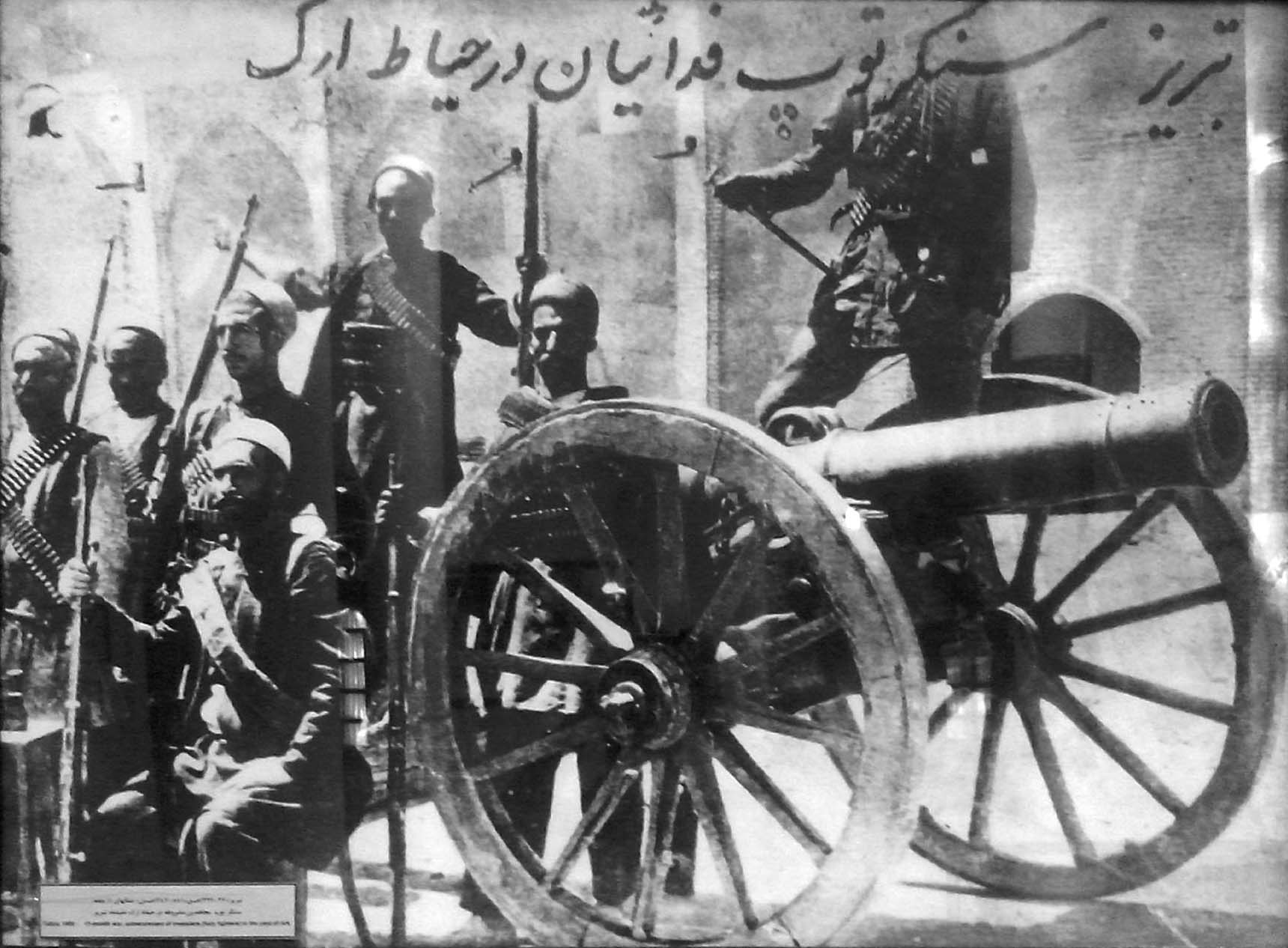
- Defenders of Tabriz
Date	1908–1909
Location	Iranian Azerbaijan, mainly Tabriz.
Result	Revolutionary victory

Belligerents
Constitutionalists	Qajar monarchy Supported by: Russian Empire

Commanders and leaders
Sattar Khan; Baqer Khan; Hoseyn Khan Baghban	Mohammad Ali Shah Qajar; Abdol Majid Mirza; Rahimkhan Chalabianloo; Shuja al-Nizam X

The Tabriz Uprising or Siege of the Constitutionalists in Tabriz — refers to the battles that took place in the city of Tabriz and the province of Azerbaijan between the constitutionalist forces and Mohammad Ali Shah Qajar. This conflict began following the period known as the "Minor Tyranny" and the bombardment of the Iranian National Assembly, and ultimately contributed, albeit indirectly, to the capture of Tehran and the dethronement of Mohammad Ali Shah.

After the Majles was shelled on 23 June 1908, constitutionalist forces in Tehran and several other cities were defeated, fled, or imprisoned. However, the constitutionalists in Tabriz resisted the Shah’s supporters and successfully forced them to retreat. Their resistance reignited hope and enthusiasm among constitutionalist factions in other parts of the country.

In Tabriz, the constitutionalists were organized through bodies such as the National Association of Azerbaijan and the Secret Center, and they maintained ties with social-democratic circles in the Caucasus. As a result, they were aware of the necessity of arming themselves and undergoing military training. By the time the conflict began, the Tabriz constitutionalists had already made preparations. In the early days, the royalist forces achieved several successes and managed to occupy large parts of the city. However, the resistance mounted by the mujahideen in the Amirkhiz district of Tabriz under the leadership of Sattar Khan led to the defeat of the forces commanded by Rahim Khan Chalabianlu.

In response, opponents of the constitutional movement formed an organization in Tabriz called the Islamic Council, whose primary objective was to portray the constitutionalists as enemies of religion in the eyes of the public. Despite this, by August–September 1908, the constitutionalist forces managed to regain full control of Tabriz.

In an effort to suppress the movement, Mohammad Ali Shah Qajar dispatched new forces under the command of Abdol Majid Mirza Qavanlu-Qajar, who placed the city under siege. Abdol Majid Mirza blocked the entry of food and essential supplies into Tabriz, causing severe famine and hardship among both civilians and the constitutionalist fighters. Russia, citing the protection of its nationals, entered Iranian territory and—with the consent of the constitutionalists—entered the city. Although the Russians initially maintained friendly relations with the constitutionalists, they soon began to pressure and persecute them, making it clear that they had no intention of withdrawing from Tabriz.

As a result, some of the constitutionalist forces in the city were scattered, while others fled or joined fellow constitutionalists in the campaign to capture Tehran.

These events have been reflected in various artistic and cultural works. In 1972, Iranian filmmaker Ali Hatami directed a film titled Sattar Khan based on these developments. Today, the busts of key military and political figures involved in the Tabriz events are displayed in the Tabriz Constitution House Museum.

== Background ==
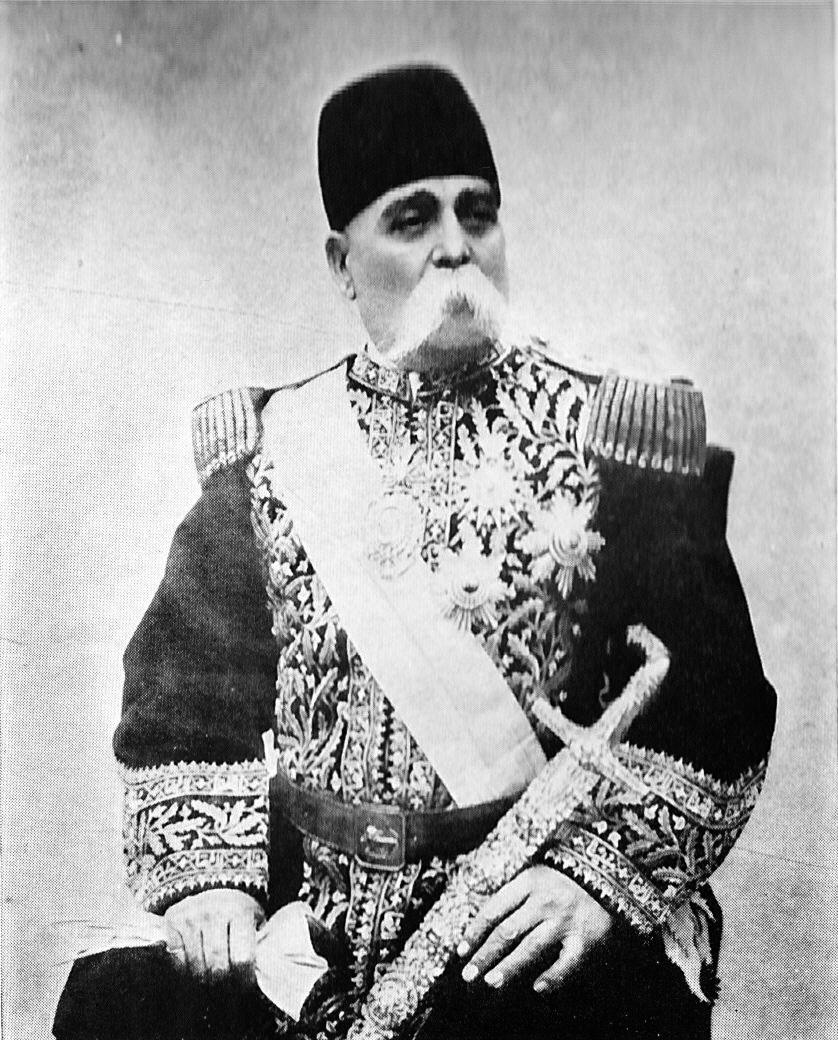
Abdol Majid Mirza announced the order to siege of Tabriz.

=== In Tabriz ===
During the Qajar era, Azerbaijan was considered the most important province after the imperial capital. From the reign of Fath-Ali Shah up until the Constitutional Revolution, the province was typically assigned to the crown prince. For this reason, its capital, Tabriz, was often referred to as the Dar al-Saltanah (Abode of the Kingdom). Tabriz was the second-largest city in the country by population.. According to Bharier, the population was around 200,000, while Barthold estimated it at 240,000. These residents lived across the city’s 16 main districts, each of which tended to be populated by specific social groups. For instance, the Sheshgelan district was largely inhabited by aristocrats; Khiyavan and Nobar were mostly home to merchants; while Qara Agach and Leylabad were primarily settled by artisans. Although the Davachi district was generally populated by low-income residents, some wealthy merchants also lived there. Tabriz held great economic significance and had access to global markets through its extensive commercial ties with the Ottoman and Russian Empires. On the eve of the Constitutional Revolution, 15 percent of Iran’s exports and 25 percent of its imports passed through this city. Some Tabrizi merchants, through their frequent travels to the Ottoman and Russian empires, became familiar with modernity, and a few of them engaged in intellectual activity. They eventually began to demand a political system based on the rule of law and a constitution (i.e., constitutionalism). Consequently, two opposing strata—the monarchists and the constitutionalists—emerged in Tabriz. Among the constitutionalist ranks were certain clerics, including Hassan Taqizadeh, as well as teachers and merchants.

Tabriz was connected to Tehran by two telegraph lines—one state-owned and the other operated by an Anglo-Indian-European company. Thanks to this, Tabriz was able to receive news from the capital quickly. Additionally, the first modern school in Iran was established in Tabriz, and after Tehran, the first journal was also published there.

On the eve of the Constitutional Revolution, many people from Iran—particularly from the province of Azerbaijan—had migrated to the Caucasus for work. A considerable number of these migrants were influenced by the 1905 Russian Revolution and began to lean toward radical ideologies. As a result, social-democratic tendencies became highly popular in Iranian Azerbaijan. It was these forces who later formed the Ijtima'iyun-i Amiyun (Social Democrats) and the National Association of Azerbaijan. According to Ismail Amirkhizi, one of the earliest members of the Ijtima'iyun-i Amiyun party, the party was founded in 1906, around the same time that the constitutional decree was issued. The founders of its Tabriz branch included individuals such as Mohammad Ali Tarbiat, Ali Monsieur, Hajji Ali Davachi, Yusif Khazdoz, and Hasan Sharifzadeh. They established a special governing body to direct the organization’s activities, known as the Secret Center. Due to the covert nature of its operations, which continued until the end of 1909, little is known about the full scope of the party’s activities. However, it is believed that the organization maintained close ties with the social-democratic centers in Baku.

As crown prince, Mohammad Ali Mirza ruled over Tabriz with an iron hand. The threat of punishment became a widespread fear among the people, who felt they could not speak freely even in their own homes. Mohammad Ali Mirza paid particular attention to religious obligations, organizing Ashura ceremonies and sponsoring the publication of numerous religious and prayer texts. During the Constitutional Revolution, he attempted to prevent the unrest in Tehran from spreading to the province of Azerbaijan. While political turmoil plagued the capital, Tabriz and the surrounding region remained largely calm. The first public action taken by the constitutionalists in Tabriz occurred in late summer 1906, during the selection of representatives for the National Assembly. At that time, the electoral regulations had not yet been sent to Tabriz. The city’s secret societies called on people to stage a sit-in at the British consulate, and many responded positively to this invitation. In September, Mozaffar ad-Din Shah Qajar granted permission for elections to be held in Azerbaijan. The constitutionalists who had gathered within the Secret Center established an organization to oversee the elections, known as the National Association of Azerbaijan. The Council’s activities continued even after the elections had concluded.

In December 1906, when Mozaffar al-Din Shah Qajar fell ill, the crown prince, Mohammad Ali Mirza, was summoned from Tabriz to Tehran. The National Association of Azerbaijan used this opportunity to form armed groups and provide them with training. These groups later became known as the Constitutional Mujahideen. The power vacuum resulting from the political transition in Azerbaijan led to deteriorating security and worsening economic conditions in the province. The Mujahideen responded by forcing hoarders to sell their stored grain to the public and by imposing price controls to prevent inflation. These actions led to a surge in public support and a growing number of volunteers. Public speakers in the city encouraged people to join these groups in their sermons and speeches.

Initially, the Mujahideen consisted mostly of tradesmen and small-scale merchants. Over time, however, they began to attract individuals from other social classes, including the luti. The luti and Mujahideen shared certain characteristics: a search for justice, defense of the oppressed, and a general fearlessness in the face of confrontation. However, the luti were also associated with lawlessness and a lack of discipline. Sattar Khan was one such luti who later joined the Mujahideen. Another contingent of Mujahideen included Tabrizis who had previously joined the Ijtima'iyun (Socialist) Party in Baku. According to Taqizadeh, these fighters were known as the “Caucasian Mujahideen” because of the Caucasian-style uniforms they wore. The Caucasian Mujahideen recruited their own members and trained them independently, asserting their autonomy from the Secret Center. Their close ties to the socialist centers in Baku eventually led the Secret Center to grow suspicious of them.

Among the various Mujahideen factions in Tabriz, there was also a conservative armed group led by Mir Hashem Tabrizi. He viewed both the Secret Center and the Caucasian Mujahideen with equal skepticism, believing that both were under foreign influence. Over time, tensions between these armed groups intensified, occasionally erupting into open conflict.

In November and December 1907, Mohammad Ali Shah began his initial efforts to dissolve the Majles. Although the constitutionalists appeared to successfully thwart his attempts, and although he seemed to retreat from his demands, he continued secretly preparing for the assembly’s dissolution. During this period, Azerbaijan became one of the centers of anti-constitutional activity. Reactionary forces there promoted ideological and regional divisions and conducted propaganda campaigns against the constitutionalists. As a result, divisions among the constitutionalist armed groups became more pronounced. One of the most significant clashes occurred on January 17, 1908, between the Mujahideen of the Khiyavan district, led by Mir Hashem Tabrizi and Baqir Khan, and those of the Sahrob district, commanded by Tufangchi. The fighting lasted two weeks and resulted in twenty people being killed or wounded. Although the National Association of Azerbaijan mediated an end to the conflict, constitutionalist leaders across all districts began mobilizing forces in preparation for future battles.

On the 5th of Esfand 1286 (late February 1908), anti-constitutionalist forces established the Islamic Council. One of the Council’s primary activities was to portray the constitutionalists as irreligious through extensive propaganda. This campaign had a strong impact on public opinion and further intensified the political atmosphere in Tabriz.

=== In Tehran ===
In Tehran, following the prolonged tensions between the Shah and the Majles during 1907–1908, Mohammad Ali Shah left the capital on May 25, 1908, and moved to the Shah Garden (Shahbagh). Five days later, he issued a telegram from there, which was circulated across the country, accusing the constitutionalists of causing instability in the Iranian nation and state.

The news of the Shah’s actions in Tehran soon reached Tabriz and triggered unrest. The National Association of Azerbaijan endorsed a plan to depose Mohammad Ali Shah, which was supported by the constitutionalist factions of the city. Some of the mujahideen proposed sending selected individuals to Tehran to assist the cause. On June 17, 1908, a contingent of 300 mujahideen was prepared to be dispatched to Tehran. They set up camp in the village of Basmenj, near Tabriz, and awaited reinforcements. The commander of this group was Rashid al-Mulk, an ally of Mir Hashem Tabrizi, though he remained loyal to the Shah. The contingent also included prominent figures such as Sattar Khan and Baqir Khan, each commanding a group of fifty men.

On June 19, Hasan Mujtahid Tabrizi declared that the constitution contradicted Islamic law and praised the Shah’s recent actions in a telegram sent directly to him. Anti-constitutional elements in Tabriz intensified their activities from June 20 onward, gathering under the newly formed Islamic Anjoman. Local tribal leaders, including Shukrullah Khan Marandi, Sam Khan of the Haji Alilu clan, Zargam al-Nizam, and Haji Faramarz Khan, joined forces with them along with their armed followers. Consequently, several thousand riflemen assembled in the Davachi district of Tabriz, preparing for armed conflict with the constitutionalists. In response, the constitutionalists reaffirmed their resolve to resist and recalled their forces from Basmenj.

Once Mohammad Ali Shah had consolidated his power, he entrusted the task of crushing parliamentary resistance to Colonel Vladimir Liakhov, commander of the Persian Cossack Brigade. On June 23, 1908, the Majles was bombarded with artillery fire. After sustaining significant casualties, the constitutionalists were defeated. Many individuals looted the parliament building, party offices, and the homes of constitutionalist leaders. Following this victory, Mohammad Ali Shah declared the dissolution of the Majles and proclaimed a state of emergency. Liakhov was appointed military governor of Tehran, and 39 individuals were arrested. Among the casualties was Mirza Ebrahim Tabrizi, the parliamentary representative from Tabriz, who died while actively resisting the government forces during the street clashes.

Upon hearing the news from Tehran, armed opponents of the constitutional movement launched attacks on the constitutionalists’ positions. Despite the rapid defeat of constitutionalist forces in Tehran, resistance in Tabriz began on June 23 and would continue for several months.

After the shelling of the Majles, hope for constitutionalism began to fade across the country. Historian Abbas Amanat Acudani describes the situation as follows:

Those who truly desired freedom retreated into corners, holding their breath. Everyone believed that the word ‘constitutionalism’ would never again be heard in Iran—until the news of Tabriz’s resistance slowly began to spread…

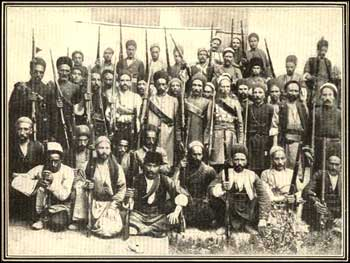
Sattar Khan and Baqir Khan among Azerbaijani revolutionaries

== The Outbreak of the uprising and Chalabiyanlu’s assault on Tabriz ==
In the days immediately following the bombardment of the Majles, the foundations of the constitutionalist administrative apparatus in Tabriz collapsed. Some members of the Provincial Council joined the supporters of Mohammad Ali Shah, while others sought refuge in the French and Russian consulates. A number of them went into hiding in various locations. Haji Rahim Khan Chalabiyanlu, the chief of the Chalabiyanlu tribe from Qaradagh, was ordered by the Shah to attack and capture Tabriz. On 23 June 1908, he approached the outskirts of Tabriz with 1,000 cavalrymen and three cannons. Many residents of Tabriz, hoping to avoid clashes and bloodshed, attempted to persuade the constitutionalists to surrender. As a result, Baqer Khan abandoned resistance along with his forces and returned home. White flags, symbolizing surrender, began to appear on rooftops throughout the city. It soon became clear that the only group still resisting was in the Amirkhiz neighborhood, under the leadership of Sattar Khan. However, the looting, robberies, and killings carried out by royalist forces in the city led to widespread dissatisfaction—even in neighborhoods where the constitutionalists had not been supported.

In late Tir (mid-July), Sattar Khan and his followers secretly went to the Ark fortress and tore down the white flags that had been raised there. This act served as a signal for pro-constitutional fighters to return. Around the same time, Baqir Khan, having rearmed, launched an assault with his fighters on Shahzadeh Garden, where Rahim Khan had taken up position. As a result of the attack, Rahim Khan was forced to abandon the city. According to the Encyclopaedia of the Islamic World, the date of Rahim Khan’s flight from Tabriz is given as July (24 Tir). After his departure, the Provincial Council granted Sattar Khan and Baqer Khan the honorary titles of Sardar-e Melli ("National Commander") and Salar-e Melli ("National Leader") in recognition of their bravery and struggle.

The constitutionalists found their main base of support in Tabriz's middle-class neighborhoods, such as Sheykhi and Amirkhiz. In response, the Friday Prayer Leader (Imam Jom‘eh) of Tabriz, Haji Mirza Karimi, organized supporters of Mohammad Ali Shah and, with assistance from the Shahsevan tribes, established centers of resistance in lower-class areas such as Sorkhab. Conservative clerics in Tabriz sought to win over the poorer segments of society by fostering suspicion toward the constitutionalists. On 30 September 1908, after the constitutionalist feda'is captured the Davachi district—one of the main strongholds of the reactionary forces—the members of the anti-constitutional Islamiyya-e Davachi Council, particularly its founders and organizers including Mir Hashem, money-changers Haji Mohammad Taqi, Haji Mir Manaf, and Haji Mirza Baqer, as well as Rahim Khan, Shuja Nizam, and other leading reactionaries, fled the neighborhood and sought refuge in the camp of Ayn al-Dowleh. The residents of Davachi, Sorkhab, and Baghmisheh surrendered to Sattar Khan with their artillery and other weapons. Thus, Tabriz’s middle-class neighborhoods became centers of support for the constitutionalists, while the lower-class districts aligned with anti-constitutional forces. After capturing the city, the constitutionalists were confronted by rural tribesmen and Shahsevan forces who had encircled Tabriz. However, before the constitutionalists could fully consolidate control over the city, Russian reports sent from Tabriz depicted the situation as follows:

...In the areas still under government control, all administrative offices have been destroyed. However, in the region governed by Sattar Khan, they have remained untouched. Official documents are now printed with the title ‘The Sublime Province of Azerbaijan’ (Ayalat-e Jalile-ye Azerbaijan). In recent days, a secret council known as the Majles-e Gheibi (‘Invisible Assembly’) has been formed in Tabriz. This committee, bearing the seals of Sattar and Baqer, sends notices to wealthy individuals demanding specified sums. The committee has resolved to raise 65,000 tomans, of which 28,000 have so far been collected. These funds are designated for the defense of constitutionalism. According to rumors, a group of revolutionaries from the South Caucasus has arrived in Tabriz, including several explosives specialists. Our customs officials in Julfa have confiscated 1.5 poods of dynamite en route to Tabriz...

== Polarization Between Constitutionalists and Their Opponents ==
On 5 August 1908, the National Association of Azerbaijan, which had suspended its activities during the initial arrests, reconvened and was reconstituted with newly elected representatives to assume administrative control of the city. The mujahideen under the command of Sattar Khan began operating as the military arm of the Association. On 17 August, ‘Abd al-Majid Mirza Qavanlu-Qajar was appointed as the new governor of Azerbaijan by order of Mohammad Ali Shah and arrived in Tabriz. He was accompanied by Mohammad Vali Khan Tonekaboni, who was assigned as the commander of the Azerbaijani forces. Although new negotiations were initiated upon the arrival of ‘Abd al-Majid Mirza, they ultimately yielded no results. By mid-September 1908, an army consisting of several thousand cavalrymen and multiple cannons was dispatched from Tehran and joined the royalist side. In his History of the Iranian Constitutional Revolution, Ahmad Kasravi states that the anti-constitutionalist forces numbered around 30,000. However, British journalist Arthur Moore and French officer Angevour both reported a figure of 6,000. The state was unable to pay the salaries of this army and therefore permitted them to plunder the city. Among the besieging forces were cavalrymen from the Yurtchu clan of the Shahsevan tribe and from the Qaradagh tribal confederation. Estimates for the number of constitutionalist forces vary in different sources, ranging from 2,000 to 10,000.

Sattar Khan assumed leadership of the Tabriz mujahideen on his own initiative. He was not appointed to this role by any person or organization. However, his charisma and courageous conduct elevated him to such a position that the mujahideen began to follow him. He participated in all major confrontations in Tabriz and consistently risked his life by placing himself on the front lines. He was also involved in making political decisions, assisted in this by Isma‘il Amirkhizi and Mirza ‘Ali Siqqat al-Islam. Other commanders who led mujahideen forces alongside Sattar Khan included Baqir Khan, Hoseyn Khan Baghban, Haji Khan, Mohammad-Sadeq Khan, and Yar-Mohammad Khan.

At the same time, merchants operating in Istanbul established an organization under the name “Anjoman-e Sa‘adat” (Society of Prosperity). The aim of the organization was to collect financial support for the constitutionalists and to disseminate information about Azerbaijan to clerics in Najaf and other parts of the world. The organization was effective in fulfilling these tasks.

In September 1908, Mortezaquli Iqbal al-Saltaneh, the governor of Maku, marched toward Tabriz with his forces to fight the constitutionalists. His nephew, ‘Izzatollah Makui, was appointed as commander of these forces. On 9 September, heavy fighting occurred between the constitutionalists and Iqbal al-Saltaneh’s troops in the villages of Khaje Dizaj and Sāghālān near Tabriz. As a result, the anti-constitutionalist forces plundered both villages and killed many of their inhabitants. Four village elders were executed by cannon fire.

Following their defeat in the First Russian Revolution, the Russian Social Democratic Labour Party issued a declaration expressing support for the resistance in Tabriz. The party called upon those with military experience and combat training to join the mujahideen in Tabriz, bringing with them their arms and ammunition. Consequently, volunteers from the Caucasus began arriving in Tabriz to fight. Among them were Iranian émigrés working in the Caucasus, Azerbaijani Turks from Northern Azerbaijan, Georgian Social Democrats, and Dashnak Armenians. These volunteers began arriving gradually in Tabriz from August–September 1908. Edward Granville Browne estimates their number at around 100 individuals. However, the Russian Empire’s Ministry of Foreign Affairs stated in August 1908 that the number of Caucasian volunteers who had joined the mujahideen in Tabriz ranged between 300 and 500. Historian Afary estimates this number to be between 500 and 800. The arrival of Caucasian émigrés in Tabriz had a profound impact on the local constitutionalists and further radicalized the atmosphere. These revolutionaries wore uniforms, spoke openly about their revolutionary ideals, and played a leading role in efforts to realize them, owing to their greater experience. Their presence—particularly that of the Georgian revolutionaries—was significant in several ways. Their liberal outlook provoked opposition from conservative clerics, who branded them as atheists. First, they were skilled fighters who could serve as shock troops during critical moments in combat. Second, they taught the constitutionalists modern methods of warfare. Third, their experience in urban struggles in the Russian Empire helped popularize the effective use of hand grenades. Fourth, their arrival in besieged Tabriz raised morale among both the population and the constitutionalist forces.

In the early stages of the resistance, the constitutionalists lacked organization and military discipline. However, as it became clear that the conflict would persist for a long time, a committee called the Military Commission was established to function as a central command for the constitutionalist forces. This commission was overseen by Sattar Khan and Baqer Khan. Under its orders, the constitutionalists were divided into units of 25 men. Each unit elected its own commander and was assigned to defend a specific position. Additionally, a Donation Commission was established to oversee military expenditures. This commission included 12 merchants and distributed funds to cover the battle costs of the constitutionalist commanders. The daily wage of an ordinary constitutionalist was one qiran. Bakeries were also established in the Khiyaban and Amirkhiz neighborhoods to support the mujahideen.

The constitutionalists acquired their weapons through various means. Initially, weapons seized during the attack on the Ark Fortress in Tabriz were distributed among the volunteers. These weapons had limited range and were thus not very effective in combat. The Caucasian revolutionaries had brought their own arms. Over time, a trade network emerged to transport needed arms from Baku and Tiflis to Tabriz. As a result, the Julfa–Tabriz corridor became vital to the constitutionalists. While they worked to keep this route open, royalist forces sought to cut it off. With the help of a Georgian, a workshop for manufacturing hand grenades was established within Tabriz itself.

Supporters and opponents of the constitution in Tabriz
Social class	Constitutionalist	Monarchist
Politician	Ali Monsieur; Ismail Amirkhizi; Sadiq Tabatabai-Vakili; Hassan Taqizadeh	Abdol Majid Mirza
Clergy	Mirza Ali Aqa Tabrizi; Mirza Ibrahim Agha Tabrizi	Imam Cuma Haji Mirza Karim; Mirza Hasan Tabrizi; Mir Hashim Tabrizi
Warrior	Sattar Khan; Baqir Khan; Hoseyn Khan Baghban; Haji Khan; Mahammadsadiq Khan; Yarmohammad Khan Kirmanshahi; Rza Tarbiyyat; Ismail Yekani; Howard Baskerville	Murtaza-Goli İqbalassaltana Makui; Rahimkhan Chalabianloo; Samad Khan; Shukrullah Khan Marandi; Zargham Nezam; Sam Khan; Haji Faramarz Khan
Guilds and merchants	Haydar Khan Amo-oghli; Haji Mehdi Kuzekunani	

== The Complete Takeover of Tabriz by the Constitutionalists ==
In September 1908, some neighborhoods of Tabriz were under the control of the constitutionalists, while others remained in the hands of monarchists loyal to Mohammad Ali Shah. At that time, a Russian diplomat residing in Tabriz recorded the situation as follows:

On July 9, gunfire and artillery shelling persisted throughout the day, involving four neighborhoods of Tabriz that supported Sattar Khan, against the “Davachi Islamiyah” and the government forces, which included cavalry from Qaradagh and Marand. At the same time, the personal residence of the acting governor, Moktadir od-Dowleh, was attacked, but the operation failed due to the arrival of Rahim Khan’s cavalry, who came with artillery support. Around 10 p.m., the shooting resumed. That day, gunfire was again heard around 3 p.m.

Sattar Khan had decided to conduct an operation to seize the entire city. On October 10, 1908, the constitutionalist forces captured the Sheshgelan and Baghmisheh neighborhoods and launched operations against the Davachi neighborhood. After October 11, the constitutionalists also gained control of the Sarhab and Davachi neighborhoods. Abdol-Majid Mirza Qovanlu-Qajar ultimately decided to withdraw to Basmanj and surrendered the city to the constitutionalists. Thus, the entire city of Tabriz came under constitutionalist control. This offensive led to the fragmentation of monarchist forces. The leaders of the Islamic Association fled the city, Shuja al-Nezam withdrew to Marand, and Mohammad Vali Khan Tonekaboni returned to the Tonekabon region.

One of the main drivers behind this offensive by the constitutionalists was the near depletion of food supplies in the city. However, the victory enabled the restoration of supply routes into the city. Grain was collected from surrounding villages and other cities. According to Mohammad Baqir Vijouei, a Tabriz-based merchant, in his book The History of the Azerbaijani Revolution and the Tabriz Uprising, the price of bread in Tabriz dropped to such an extent that it had not been so cheap even twenty years earlier.

The complete takeover of Tabriz ushered in a period of relative calm. This allowed the National Association of Azerbaijan to resume the city’s daily administration, reopen schools, and begin addressing the damage caused by the fighting. The National Association established a committee composed of Sattar Khan, Baqir Khan, and Ajlal al-Molk to govern the city. The British Consul-General in Tabriz, Ratcliffe, reported that the city was in fact administered by Sattar Khan and Baqir Khan, while Ajlal al-Molk wielded no real power. As the next step in governing Tabriz, the constitutionalists sought to open the road from Tabriz to Jolfa, with Marand being a key point along the way. Once this route was opened, the constitutionalists could ensure a steady flow of provisions and military supplies into the city and establish connections with constitutionalists in the Caucasus. However, Shuja al-Nezam, the governor of Marand, remained a strong and serious rival of the constitutionalists. Consequently, they considered eliminating him. Haydar Khan Amo-oghli acquired the seal of one of Shuja al-Nezam’s associates, placed a bomb inside a box, sealed it with the same seal, and sent it to Shuja al-Nezam. Upon opening the box, the bomb exploded, killing him. With his death, the path was cleared for the constitutionalists to seize not only Marand, but also other Azerbaijani cities such as Khoy and Maragheh.

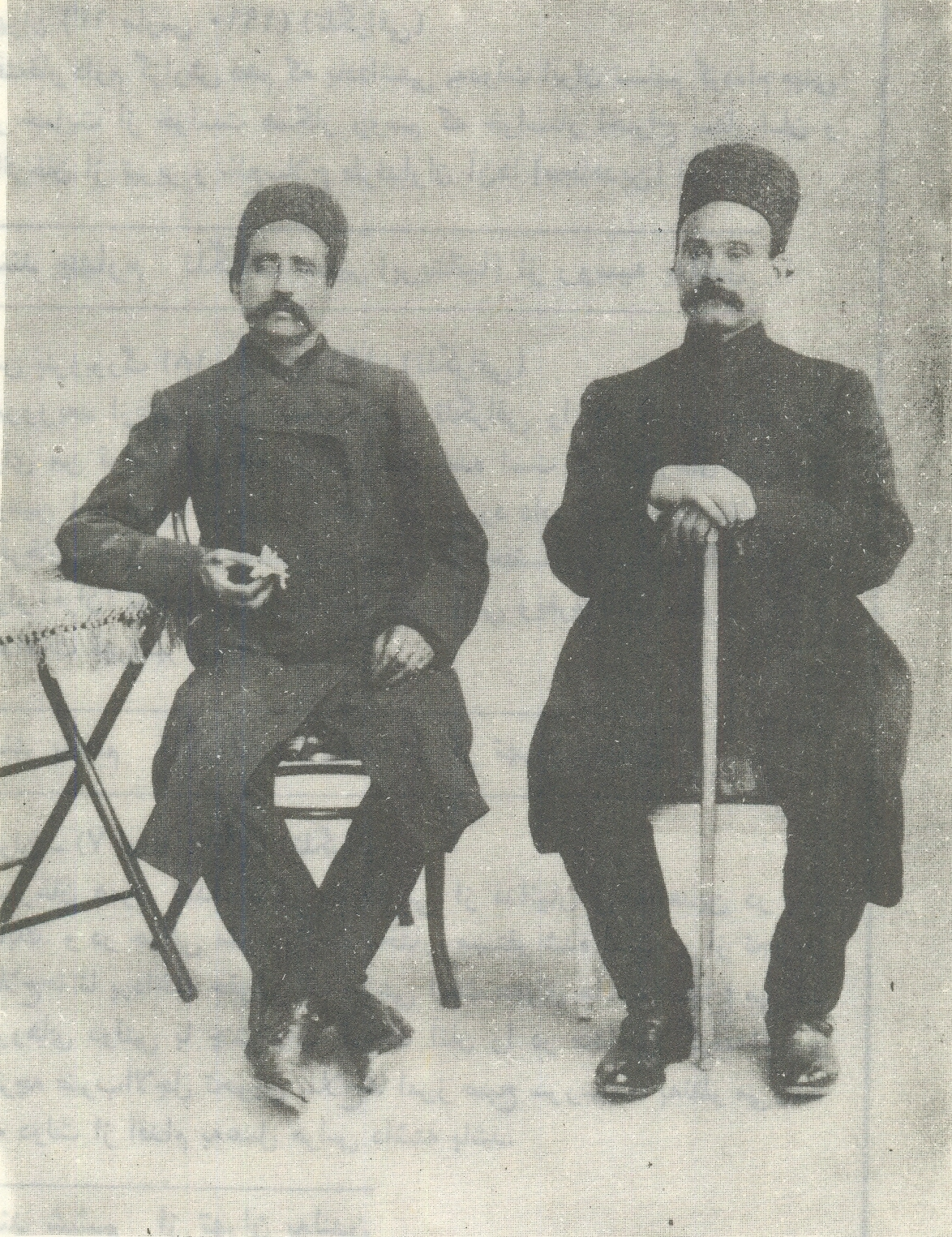
Sattar Khan and Baqir Khan.

== Siege and Famine ==
In late 1908 and early 1909, Samad Khan Shuja al-Dowleh, commanding a monarchist force composed of Qaradagh tribesmen, seized control of Maragheh and advanced toward Tabriz. He defeated the constitutionalists in the Khania region and brought Sardrud under his control. With the arrival of a new detachment of 400 Cossacks, six cannons, and regular tribal cavalry, the camp of Abdol-Majid Mirza Qovanlu-Qajar regained vitality. On January 16, 1909, these forces encircled the city. Although their assault was unsuccessful, they managed to impose a siege. Thus, a new and more intense phase of the conflict began. On February 4, 1909, the siege was complete, and all entry and exit points of the city fell into the hands of the monarchists. In response, Seyyed Hassan Taqizadeh, who had recently arrived from England and had criticized the constitutionalists’ treatment of the people, formed a new militia called the National Guard. He was also able to recruit new members from among the mujahideen. In addition, Howard Baskerville, a teacher at the American Memorial School in Tabriz, formed an armed unit composed of merchant youth, known as the Salvation Force. Although the constitutionalists made repeated attempts to break the siege, they were unsuccessful. Sattar Khan once attempted to open the road to Julfa, but Rahimkhan Chalabianloo’s forces soon arrived and stopped him.

These events were described in a book published in 1988 based on Russian archival documents as follows:

On February 20 (March 5), Abdol-Majid Mirza Qovanlu-Qajar and Samad Khan launched a general assault against the city, believing that it would decide the fate of Tabriz. The attack occurred simultaneously from the Qaramelek, Shanb Ghazan, and Basmenj directions. Additionally, Rahim Khan’s band approached the bridge over the Ajichay River and engaged in combat in the northern outskirts of Tabriz. Thus, the reactionaries attacked the city from all sides. The main blow was delivered from the west, where Samed Khan’s main forces were concentrated. The most intense fighting took place in the western districts of Tabriz—Khatib and Ahuni—as well as the adjoining Hokmavar neighborhood… In a fierce battle, the people of Tabriz completely defeated Samed Khan’s forces, which had managed to enter the city. Samed Khan himself, preparing for victory, panicked and fled from Hokmavar, abandoning his loot. The fedayi units pursued them all the way to Qaramelek. In Khatib and Ahuni, the reactionaries were also defeated and retreated...The general assault on Tabriz on February 20 (March 5), for which the reactionaries had mobilized all their forces, ended in total failure.

Despite efforts to ration essential goods, including bread, and repeated attempts to break the siege during February and March, the scarcity of supplies worsened and trade collapsed. The food shortage became so dire that people began eating grass due to hunger. Consequently, a significant number of people died of starvation. In the context of these events, the saying “We ate clover and made a constitution” in Azerbaijani Turkic emerged among the people and continues to be used to this day. The residents of Tabriz were exhausted from the war, which brought them suffering without delivering the promised results. Groups of impoverished women publicly cursed Sattar Khan and Baqir Khan. There was a growing threat that poor people would attack the homes of the wealthy or the foreign consulates. The constitutionalists declared that they would not surrender. In order to end the resistance, they put forward a set of demands, which included the establishment of a constitutional regime in the country, a general amnesty, the lifting of the siege on the city, and the appointment of a new governor to Azerbaijan.

To address the problems arising from the famine, the constitutionalists appealed to the British and Russian consuls:

...The Association officially informed all the consulates that it was impossible to provide bread to foreign subjects and invited Consul Wratislaw and me to discuss the situation. In writing, the Association requested our assistance in the following matters: 1) to open the Basmenj road and to allow the daily delivery of 150 kharvars of wheat and flour into the city for the starving population. They guaranteed that the bread would not be taken by the fighting fedayi forces and would be distributed solely to those suffering from hunger...

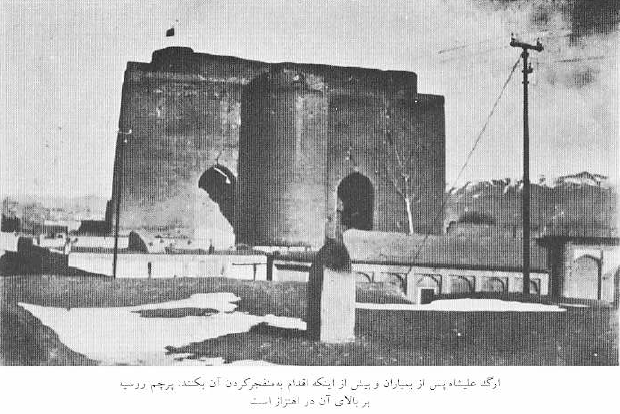
The Russian flag on the Arg of Tabriz.

== The Entry of Russian Forces and the Lifting of the Siege ==
According to the agreement signed in 1907 between the Russian and British empires, northern Qajar Iran was designated as a Russian sphere of influence, while the southern regions fell under British influence. With the signing of this agreement—commonly referred to as the 1907 Convention—the British abandoned their policy, upheld for 75 years, of opposing or retaliating against Russian attempts to intervene or expand influence in northern Iran. The agreement granted Russia the right to act unilaterally against any development it deemed contrary to its interests within its designated zone. All of Iranian Azerbaijan, including Tabriz, fell within this recognized sphere of Russian influence.

From the outset of the conflict, Russia expressed concern for the safety of its citizens. In mid-April 1909, Russia and Britain reached an understanding whereby Russian troops would enter Iranian territory and lift the siege of Tabriz. The consuls general of both countries assured the Provincial Anjoman that the Russian military presence in Tabriz would be temporary. Although the Association initially rejected this proposal, it eventually accepted the arrangement. When the Russian army reached the Julfa bridge, a local force led by Nurullah Yekani closed the bridge to prevent their passage. However, once official permission was granted by the Anjoman, the bridge was opened to allow the Russians to cross.

On April 29, 1909, a 4,000-man Russian force under the command of General Znarski reached the outskirts of Tabriz. The army consisted of four battalions of Cossacks, three infantry battalions, two artillery battalions, and one engineering battalion. The troops encamped north of the Ajichay River. Initially, relations between the constitutionalists and the Russians were quite positive. The Russians refrained from entering the city without prior permission. At the same time, the constitutionalists were satisfied, since the Russians regularly brought grain into the city and consistently emphasized the temporary nature of their presence. Sattar Khan and Baqir Khan personally went to welcome General Znarski and instructed their forces not to offer any resistance to the Russian troops. As a result, the Iranian state military was dissolved, Abdol-Majid Mirza returned to Tehran, Rahim Khan withdrew to Marand, and the tribal forces retreated to their homelands. The arrival of the Russian army significantly increased the influence of the Russian consul in Tabriz, Miller, over the city’s administration. The Russians requested Mohammad Ali Shah to appoint Ajlal al-Molk, a figure trusted by the constitutionalists, as governor of the city. Lacking alternatives, the Shah was compelled to accept this appointment.

A few days after the Russian army’s arrival, a Russian soldier standing guard was shot by an unidentified individual. In response, Russian troops opened fire indiscriminately, resulting in the death of a local resident. General Znarski demanded a payment of 10,000 tumans as compensation for the slain soldier. However, the National Association was unable to raise that amount. By the end of the designated period, only 3,000 tumans had been collected and handed over to the Russians. Tensions between the two sides began to escalate. A significant factor in this deterioration was the Russian military’s mapping of the city, which fueled widespread suspicion that their presence in Tabriz was not temporary. Although the constitutionalists protested, these objections yielded no results. Subsequently, the Russians demanded the surrender of Caucasian constitutionalists whom they claimed as their citizens. When these demands were not met, they threatened to arrest Sattar Khan and Baqir Khan. In response, the Caucasian revolutionaries fled the city at night, first to Khoy and then across the Aras River back to the Caucasus. Some of them were arrested upon arrival and were later exiled to Siberia.

On May 12, 1909, the Association announced that all individuals must surrender their weapons by noon the following day. The responsibility for collecting the weapons was assumed by the Russian forces. At the same time, on May 15, an order was issued to demolish the fortifications of Tabriz. The Russians destroyed the city's defensive structures using dynamite and artillery fire. In addition, the Russians began to pursue certain constitutionalist leaders. Among those arrested were Nayeb Qasem and Yusif Hamkavari. As a result, many constitutionalists either went into hiding or fled from Tabriz. The Caucasian revolutionaries returned to their respective regions, while Ali Monsieur was forced to seek refuge in the Ottoman consulate. The Ijtimaiyun-e-Amiyun and the Social Democratic Party ceased their activities.

Although the Russian forces initially intended to destroy Baqir Khan’s house by positioning cannons in front of it, they later abandoned this plan. Instead, they confiscated the properties of both Sattar Khan and Baqir Khan. The justification for this seizure was the alleged damage of 22,000 rubles caused by the constitutionalists to the Tabriz-Julfa Highway Company, which was to be compensated through the confiscated goods. The Russians also intended to arrest Baqir Khan, Sattar Khan, and Taqizadeh; however, they managed to escape and take refuge in the Ottoman consulate. Consequently, the Azerbaijani constitutionalists were dispersed and were unable to participate in the conquest of Tehran.

== Conclusion ==
=== Outcomes ===
The resistance of the people of Tabriz against the monarchists inspired constitutionalists in other cities to revive their own movements. New forces were organized in Khorasan, Fars, and Gorgan. Most notably, the constitutionalists in Isfahan and Gilan organized their own armed units and began marching toward Tehran. As a result of this march, they captured the capital and succeeded in deposing Mohammad Ali Shah. Although the constitutionalists of Tabriz were unable to participate in the campaign that led to the victory in Tehran due to the Russian occupation of the city, their eleven-month resistance had served to motivate constitutionalists elsewhere. With the abdication of Mohammad Ali Shah and the enthronement of Ahmad Shah Qajar, the constitutionalist forces were disbanded. On August 19, 1909, Mehdi Qoli Hedayat arrived in Tabriz as the new governor of Azerbaijan. Although he was a supporter of the constitutional movement and a modest man in private affairs, he considered politics to be the domain of intellectual elites, and thus paid little attention to the constitutionalist leaders.

The resistance of the Tabriz constitutionalists laid the groundwork for another freedom movement that would erupt years later in the city. This movement, led by Sheikh Mohammad Khiyabani, began in April 1920 and ended in September of the same year with his death. During the Tabriz uprising, Khiyabani had supported the constitutionalists and was later elected as a representative to the Iranian Majles from that city. He was a vocal opponent of the 1919 Anglo-Iranian Agreement and a critic of the central government's policies.

=== Fate of the Individuals ===
On March 19, 1910, Sattar Khan and Baqir Khan were invited to Tehran by the regent Ali Reza Khan Qovanlu-Qajar. Historian Shapour Ravasani argues that this invitation was accepted not out of the constitutionalist leaders’ own will, but as a result of persistent pressure and even threats from the new government. Ravasani adds that these leaders held significant influence and popular support among both constitutionalists and the general public, which was contrary to the interests of the British and Russian empires. Therefore, the ambassadors of both empires pressured the Iranian government to bring these two figures to Tehran. The Russian government even warned that if Sattar Khan continued to interfere in the administration of Tabriz, it would launch a military attack on the city. Sattar Khan and Baqir Khan were warmly welcomed in every city along their route to Tehran. Upon their arrival in the capital, the people of Tehran received them with unprecedented enthusiasm. On April 18, 1910, they went to the National Assembly, where the deputies welcomed and congratulated them with great ceremony.

At this time, conflict broke out between the Democratic Party and the Moderate Socialist Party. This rivalry gradually escalated into armed clashes, mutual attacks, and eventually the assassination of Seyyed Abdollah Behbahani. The Democratic Party and Haydar Khan Amo-oghli were accused of orchestrating the assassination. Subsequently, the Majlis ordered all constitutionalists to surrender their weapons by mid-August 1910. However, this order was applied particularly rigorously to Sattar Khan and Baqir Khan. Supporters of Sardar As'ad Bakhtiari and the Democratic Party were still allowed to carry weapons freely. As a result, Sattar Khan and his followers viewed the order with suspicion and refused to comply. A confrontation broke out between the state forces and the constitutionalists during the disarmament operation in Atabak Park. During this incident, Sattar Khan was shot in the knee. It is believed that he may have been shot by someone from within his own close circle. Due to this wound, Sattar Khan lived with a limp for the rest of his life.

Sattar Khan lived for another four years, but during this period he remained in isolation. He corresponded with the central government and even with Abdol-Majid Mirza Qovanlu-Qajar, stating that if permitted, he could put an end to the Russian occupation of Azerbaijan. However, these offers were ignored. He died in Tehran on the 25th of Aban 1293 (November 17, 1914). Baqir Khan also continued to live in isolation in Tehran. The government granted him a pension of 300 tumans. After the outbreak of World War I, Baqir Khan set out from Tehran toward Kermanshah with his supporters, intending to reach either Baghdad or Istanbul to meet with German officials. However, in Kermanshah, he and his companions were attacked by bandits, and all were killed in the clash.

Although Abdol Majid Mirza was not reappointed to any state position after the constitutional revolution, he continued to appear in government circles. Through these visits, he developed close relationships with both As'ad Bakhtiari and Ahmad Qavam.

Since the Russians had no intention of leaving Tabriz, they faced an uprising by the constitutionalists in 1911. The Russians managed to suppress the rebellion and executed forty individuals. Among those executed were the pro-constitution cleric Mirza Ali Siqat al-Islam, members of the Provincial Anjoman such as Sheikh Salim and Sadiq al-Molk, members of the Secret Center such as Hajji Ali Davachi, and the two young sons of Ali Monsieur. Samed Khan Shuja al-Dowleh, who had previously led the siege of Tabriz, returned to the city and assumed control of its administration with the support of the Russian army. He extended his rule over Tabriz by engaging in acts of violence and continuing the execution of constitutionalists.

== Reverberations and Evaluations of the Event ==
=== Historical Assessment ===
According to historian Mashallah Ajoudani, the Caucasian fighters, who possessed experience and skill in bomb-making and organizing resistance, fought alongside Sattar Khan in Tabriz and considered the struggle against Mohammad Ali Shah as a form of resistance against the Russian government. In his view, the presence of these forces played a significant role in the success of constitutionalists in various regions of Iran, including Tabriz. Nevertheless, Ajoudani adds that their role has been exaggerated and provides examples of how these forces engaged in looting and pillaging under the guise of struggle. Iranian historian Rasoul Jafarian evaluates the constitutionalists of Tabriz as being under the influence of Caucasian fighters, inspired by the social-democratic current, and distancing themselves from a local reformist line. He sees this shift as contradictory to the constitutional understanding of the Islamic scholars of the time. According to him, extremism, disregard for religious sentiments, non-local extremist ideas, and violence caused people and religious groups to turn away from the Tabrizi constitutionalists.

Mousa Ghaninejad considers the cooperation between Caucasian social democrats and the constitutionalists as a tactical collaboration aimed at a new stage—i.e., socialist revolution. He views the objectives of this group as distinct from those of the Constitutional Movement. He connects this idea to the land reform plan proposed by the National Association of Azerbaijan intended to benefit the peasants. He asserts that although the social democrats lacked a broad popular base, they were politically influential. Of course, the activities of the Caucasians were not limited to Tabriz. They were also active in Tehran, Rasht, and Isfahan.

Political sociologist Sohrab Yazdani notes that many constitutionalists lacked literacy and clear political vision. Although the Ejtemaiyun-e Amiyun and the Secret Center attempted to solidify their social views, there were numerous accounts of these fighters committing acts of looting, kidnapping, and even murder. As an indication of this, he points to the failure to establish a connection between the constitutionalists and the intellectuals. These two groups viewed each other with suspicion. The intellectuals considered the constitutionalists as vulgar and prone to violence, while the constitutionalists regarded the intellectuals as opportunists.

After the conquest of Tehran and the dethronement of Mohammad Ali Shah Qajar, the divergence of opinion between Sattar Khan, Baqir Khan, and other constitutional leaders led to their isolation. In this regard, Ismail Amirkhizi and Abdolhossein Nava’i claim that Sattar Khan's character changed after he gained power and achieved victory. He no longer tolerated even minor errors among his subordinates and ignored the advice and opinions of other constitutional leaders such as Taghizadeh. In contrast, Ahmad Kasravi accused Taghizadeh and his allies of being egoistic and of downplaying the actions of the fighters. Janet Afary believes that the roots of this disagreement lay deeper, stemming from political differences between liberals and democrats that had not been as apparent before the conquest of Tehran. According to Afary, although the representatives considered the social democrats as troublesome elements, they were aware of their necessity for continuing the revolution. However, this required the replacement of their leaders with more experienced and prudent figures.

=== Echo in the Press ===
==== In Iran ====
Seyed Mohammadreza Mosavat fled to the Caucasus after the bombardment of the Majles in Tehran and later came to Tabriz. For a time, he published a newspaper titled Mosavat there. In its first issue, Seyed Mohammadreza wrote about the Tabriz region and praised the revolutionary actions of the constitutionalists.

The satirical magazine Molla Nasreddin, published weekly in Azerbaijani Turkic in Tiflis, was a fervent supporter of the adoption of constitutionalism in Iran. However, it also occasionally criticized the Constitutional Movement. For instance, in its 27th issue, Molla Nasreddin criticized the emergence of factions among the constitutionalists in Tabriz. The magazine argued that this factionalism would lead to discord and deepen the division among the people. In its 49th issue dated December 30, 1907, the magazine linked the beating of the editor-in-chief of the Mohakemat newspaper by constitutionalists to this factionalism.

In contrast, Amla-ye ‘Omm, the organ of the Islamic Council, was firmly against the constitutionalists. The newspaper accused them of being Babis or faithless. For example, Haji Mehdi Kuzekonani was criticized for nepotism in governance. At the same time, constitutional leaders such as Ali Monsiur and Baqir Khan were also targets of criticism in this publication.

==== In Other Countries ====
French publications disseminated a significant amount of material regarding the Constitutional Revolution and its developments. Examples of such newspapers include Les Deux-mondes, Le Siècle, Le Temps, and L’Humanité. However, these newspapers rarely supported popular movements. In September 1908, a French officer named Fernand Anginieur visited Tabriz during his journey to the Middle East. He stayed in the city for 24 days and had the opportunity to closely observe the events. During his stay in Tabriz, he also prepared a map showing the inclinations of the city’s neighborhoods toward the constitutionalists or the monarchists. Upon returning to France, Fernand published his memoirs and delivered numerous talks on his impressions. He highlighted the lack of organizational structure in the country and considered widespread corruption and opium use as prominent negative characteristics. At the same time, he stated that Sattar Khan and his supporters were the only individuals capable of determining the future of the country.

In Russia, the conservative journal Novoye Vremya, referring to the events in Tabriz, wrote that “chaos in Tabriz has reached an unbelievable level” and that the city had been “devastated and plundered by savage revolutionaries.” During that period, Vladimir Lenin—himself an opponent of the Russian Tsarist government and then living in exile in Europe—condemned Russia’s actions in Iran in several articles published in the journal Proletary, also criticizing the behavior of Britain and other European countries as hypocritical. In his article entitled “Explosive Materials in the Realm of Politics,” he praised the armed resistance of the people of Tabriz against Mohammad Ali Shah.

One of the events during the siege of Tabriz that resonated in the international press was the killing of Howard Baskerville, an American teacher at the Memorial School who had joined the constitutionalists and led the Rescue Corps. At that time, British journalist Henry Moore, who was in Tabriz and led another group of constitutionalists, reported in The Times of London on the circumstances of Baskerville’s death. The event was also covered by The Washington Post.

=== Art and Literature ===
Between 1933 and 1940, Mahammad Said Ordubadi wrote his novel Foggy Tabriz, dedicated to the period of the siege of Tabriz. The novel recounts a love story set against the backdrop of the siege. Ordubadi himself was in Tabriz during the events and was one of the members of Sattar Khan’s headquarters. This work was later translated into Persian and published by Saeed Moniri.

Samad Behrangi recommended Gholamhossein Saedi’s collection of plays Five Plays from the Constitutional Revolution and The Story of the Long Cannon to understand the situation in Azerbaijan during that time.

In 2002 (1381 A.H.), Ali Hatami directed a film titled Sattar Khan. However, the film sparked controversy upon release and its screening was subsequently halted. The film portrayed historical events from the time of the siege, such as the disarmament of the constitutionalists, their defeat in Tabriz, and Sattar Khan’s refuge in the Ottoman consulate. Rather than merely depicting historical events, the film offered a critical portrayal of the class and social dynamics of the time. Additionally, in 2017 (1396 A.H.), a television series focusing on the life of Sattar Khan was produced. Directed by Mohammadreza Varzi, the series was broadcast on Channel One and consisted of 10 episodes, focusing on the final years of Sattar Khan’s life.

Due to the famine during the siege of Tabriz, people began eating grass and herbs. This gave rise to a popular saying among the people: “We ate clover and gained constitutionalism.”

== Legacy ==
Following the Islamic Revolution, two streets in Tehran were named after Sattar Khan and Baqir Khan.

During the Azerbaijan National Government, which operated in 1945-1946, statues of the leaders of the uprising, Sattar Khan and Baqir Khan, as well as Sheikh Mohammad Khiyabani, who was considered a follower of this movement, were erected in the center of the city to commemorate the Tabriz Uprising. At the same time, the statue of Reza Shah Pahlavi was dismantled, and one of the main boulevards as well as Gulistan Park were renamed in honor of Sattar Khan. The decision on the erection of these statues, signed by Haji Mirza Ali Shabustari, stated:

Reza Khan (Reza Shah Pahlavi), having posed a threat to the freedom of the Iranian people and led the country into decline, must have his monument removed from Gulistan Garden. In its place, a statue of National Commander Sattar Khan should be erected, and Gulistan Garden should be named after him. Baqir Khan’s statue should be erected near Ark Fortress, one of the historical shelters of Azerbaijani partisans.

After the fall of the National Government to the Tehran army in December 1946, these statues were destroyed and replaced by a statue of Mohammad Reza Shah Pahlavi.

At the same time, the leaders of the National Government frequently referred to Sattar Khan and the Tabriz uprising in their speeches. Emphasis on the movements of Sattar Khan and Khiabani was framed within the context of national competition between Tehran and Tabriz and the highlighting of key phases in the Azerbaijani people’s national struggle. During the gathering where the Azerbaijan Democratic Party under Sayyid Jafar Pishevari declared the formation of the National Government, the hall was decorated with portraits of Sattar Khan, Baqir Khan, Sheikh Mohammad Khiabani, and Haydar Khan Amo-oghli. Pishevari himself attended the event accompanied by Haji Azim Khan, the brother of Sattar Khan.

Since 1998, the house of Haji Mehdi Kuzekounani—one of the constitutionalist leaders of the Tabriz resistance—has operated as a museum under the auspices of the Cultural Heritage Organization and is known as the House of Constitution. In this house, which was a meeting place for constitutionalist leaders during the resistance, personal belongings, documents, newspapers, commemorative coins, honorary medals, and a memorial statue of the constitutionalists are exhibited. To commemorate Sattar Khan and Baqir Khan, two full-length statues of these figures have been placed in the museum.

Every year in the month of Mordad in the Iranian calendar, the anniversary of the Constitutional Revolution is celebrated. These commemorations feature remembrance of various events from the revolution, including the Tabriz uprising. For many years, these ceremonies have been held with the participation of important public figures. For instance, in 2004, the commemoration was held at the Constitution Museum with the presence of then-President Mohammad Khatami.

In 2014, Mohammad Yarmahammadi produced a documentary film titled The Value of the Constitution, which depicted the life of Sattar Khan and the events of the uprising in Tabriz. The documentary was screened at the 8th Haghighat Film Festival.

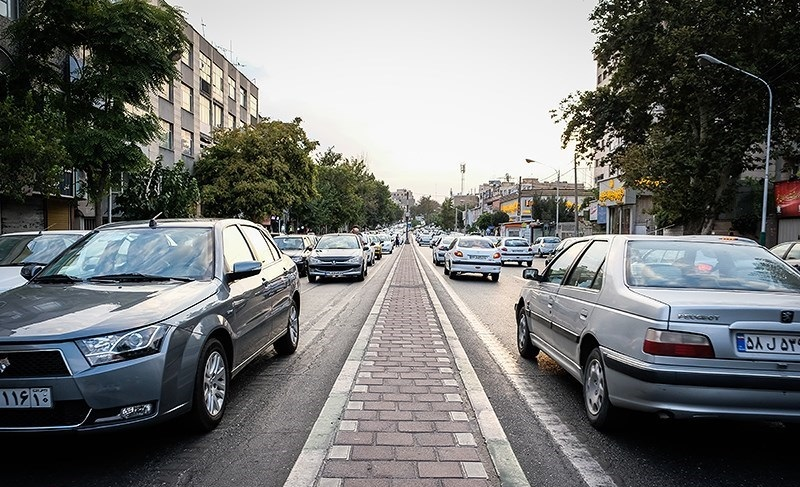
Sattar Khan Street in Tehran.

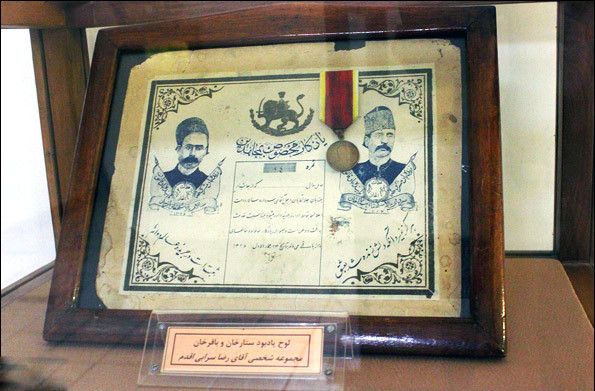
Memorial plaque of the Tabriz Constitutionalists.

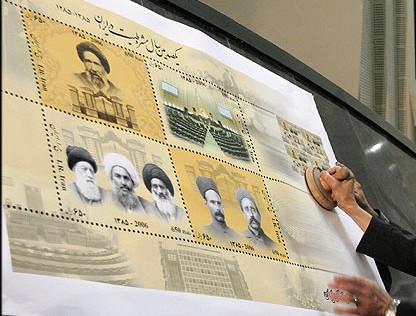
Postage stamp dedicated to the 100th anniversary of the Constitution.

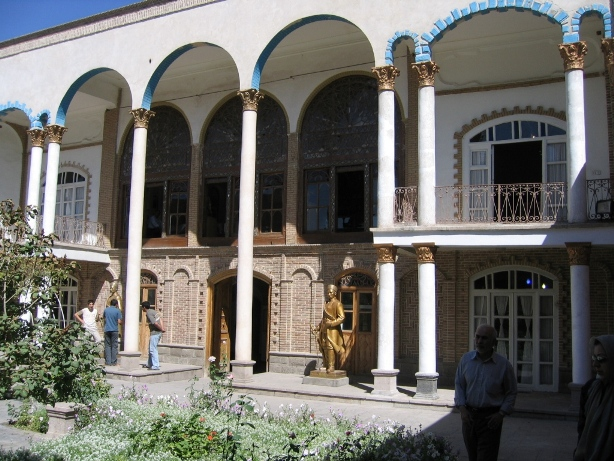
Constitution House of Tabriz

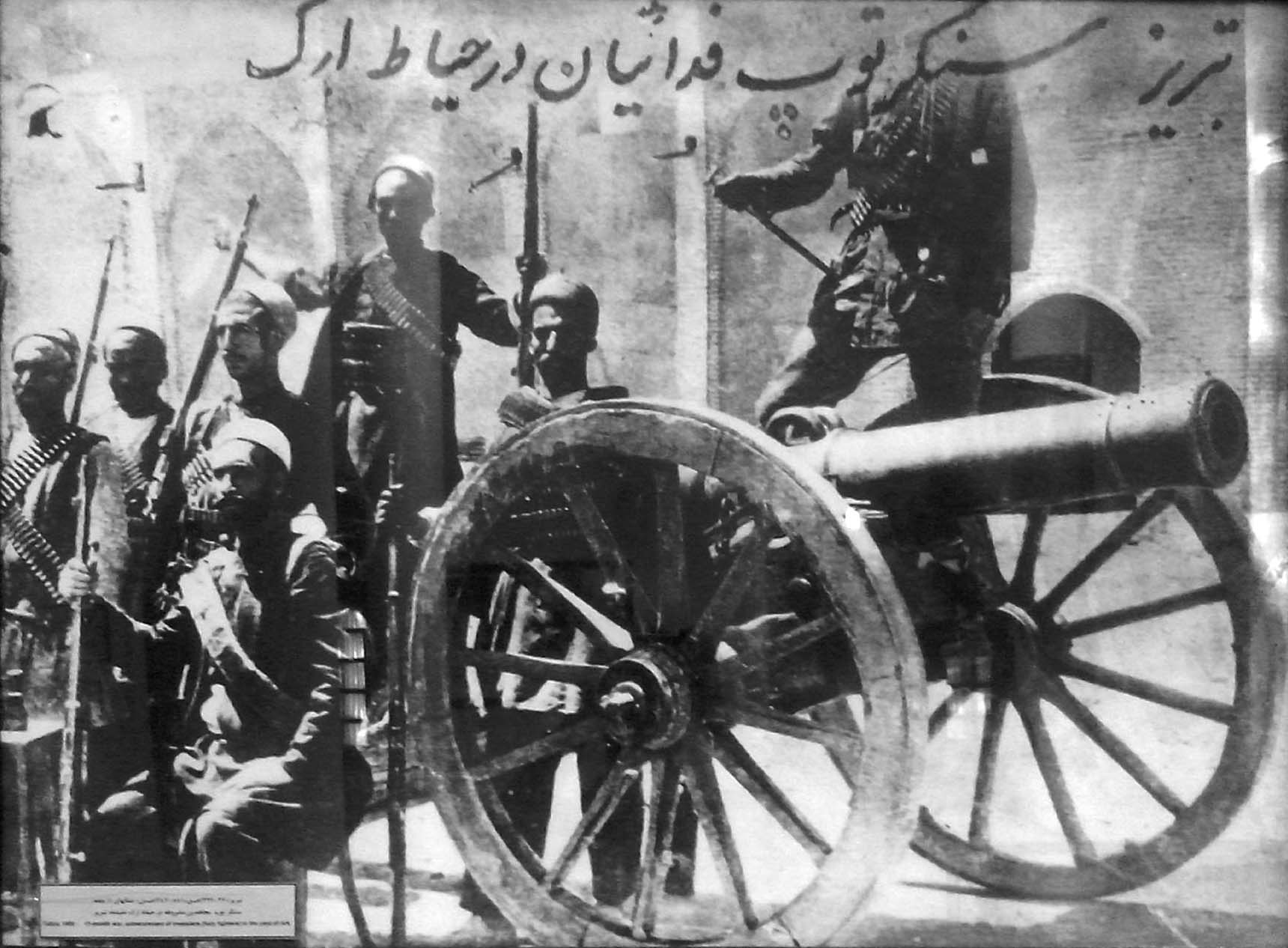
Defenders of Tabriz

== Bibliography ==
=== Primary Sources ===
- Tarikh-e Enqelāb-e Āzarbāyjān yā Bolvāy-e Tabrīz (The Uprising of Tabriz or The History of the Azerbaijani Revolution) — This diary was written by Mohammadbaqer Vejouyei and first published in lithographic print in 1909 (1287 AH). In addition to a map of Tabriz from that period, the book contains nine illustrations depicting battles. It covers the events of the first four months of the uprising, from 26 Jumada al-Thani 1326 (July 26, 1908) to 16 Ramadan 1326 (October 11, 1908).
- Tarikh-e Mashrūṭeh-ye Irān (The History of the Iranian Constitutional Revolution) — Written by Ahmad Kasravi, this work is based on his personal observations and oral sources. The author pays particular attention to the events of the constitutional period in Tabriz.
- Tarikh-e Hejdah Sāleh-ye Āzarbāyjān (Eighteen-Year History of Azerbaijan) — In this follow-up and second volume to The History of the Iranian Constitutional Revolution, Kasravi presents a detailed account of events during the constitutional period. The second part of the book focuses extensively on the arrival of Russian forces in Tabriz and developments in 1911 (1290 AH).
- Tarikh-e Enqelāb-e Mashrūṭeh-ye Irān (The History of the Iranian Constitutional Revolution) — Authored by Mohammad Malekzadeh, this work reflects his recollections and accounts regarding the constitutional movement. Malekzadeh not only addresses the events in the capital but also pays considerable attention to developments in other cities. The struggle in Tabriz and events in Azerbaijan are analyzed in depth.

=== Historiographical Sources ===
Fereydun Adamiyat was among the first to examine a range of printed and manuscript materials in his scholarly works. Rahim Raisnia and Baqer Momeni analyzed the economic and social aspects of the constitutional movement from a class-based perspective in their respective studies. Ervand Abrahamian, identifying as a political social democrat, has offered a neo-Marxist and class-based interpretation of Iranian history in his works. In addition, scholars such as Mohammad-Ali Homayoun Katouzian, Sadegh Zibakalam, Mashallah Ajoudani, Gholamhossein Mirza Saleh, and Hassan Ghazi Moradi have published analytical and socially grounded studies on the subject. Davoud Feirahi, in his work Fiqh and Politics, explores developments in Iranian political jurisprudence following the constitutional government period. Javad Tabatabai, in The Theoretical Foundations of Constitutionalism, focuses particularly on the constitutional fatwas issued by Akhund Khorasani.

== Sources ==
- Yazdāni, Sohrāb (1388), Mojāhedān-e Mašrūṭe., Našr-e Ney, ISBN 978-964-185-083-0
- Behrangi, Samed (1347), "Āzarbāijān dar Jonbeš-e Mašrūṭe (Yek Nemūne az Maqālāt-e Taḥqīqī-ye Samed)", آرش, 18 (3), Āraš. 3 (5)
- Āfārī, Žānat (1372), "Sūsīāl Dēmōkrāsī va Enqelāb-e Mašrūṭiyat", ایران نامه, 43 (11), Īrān-Nāmeh (43)
- Abrahamian, Ervand (1377), Īrān bayn-e do enqelāb. Tarjome-ye Aḥmad Golmuḥammadī; Moḥammad-Ebrāhīm Fattāḥī Valīlāyī, Tehrān: Nashr-e Ney, ISBN 978-964-312-363-5
- Ḥoseynī, Seyyedeh Moṭahhareh (1390), Naqš-e manṭaqeh-ye Āzarbāyjān dar enqelāb-e Mašrūṭeh, Fasl-nāmeh-ye Sīāsat (19)
- Ājūdānī, Māshāʾallāh (1382), Mašrūṭeh-ye Īrānī, Tehrān: Akhtarān, ISBN 964-7514-49-2
- Majed-zādeh, Sepahrdād (1393), Čalabīānlū Raḥīm Khān, Dāneš-nāmeh-ye Jahān-e Eslām
- Pistor-Hatam, Anja (2009), SATTĀR KHAN, In Yarshater, Ehsan (ed.). Encyclopædia Iranica. Bibliotheca Persica Press.
- Белова, Н. К.; et al. (1988), М. С. Иванов; В. Н. Зайцев (eds.), Новая история Ирана : хрестоматия [New history of Iran: a reader] (in Russian), vol. 18, Moscow: Наука
- Fallāḥ Tūtkār, Ḥojjat (1388), "Dehqānān dar jonbeš-e moqāwemat-e Tabrīz (ʿaṣr-e estebdād-e ṣaġīr)", پژوهشهای علوم تاریخی, 2 (1), Pazhūheš-hā-ye ʿUlūm-e Tārīḫī (2)
- Āfārī, Žānat (1385), Enqelāb-e Mašrūṭeh-ye Īrān 1906–1911 (1285–1290). Tarjome-ye Reżā Reżāʾī, Tehrān: Nashr-e Bīstūn, ISBN 964-90036-8-1
- Ḥoseynī, Ḥoseynī, Moḥsen; Mūsā-Khānī, Yāser (1396), Mašrūṭeh va zaminah-hā-ye fekrī-ye Mašrūṭeh-ḵāhān dar Marand, Tārīḫ-e Now (19)
- Clarke, James (1384), "Mašrūṭeh-ḵāhān va qazzāqhā: jonbeš-e Mašrūṭīyat va modāḵele-ye Rūs-hā dar Āzarbāyjān (1907–1911). Tarjome-ye Maryam Rabī", تاریخ روابط خارجی, 23 (6), Tārīḫ-e Ravābeṭ-e Ḵārejī (23)
- Karīmī, Behnām (1382), Andīsheh-ye qīām-e Šeyḵ Moḥammad Ḵīyābānī, Ganjīneh-ye Asnād
- Ravāsānī, Shāpūr (1385), Sattār Khān, Sardār-e Mellī, Ḵedmatgozār va Qahramān-e setam-dīdegān-e Īrān, Eṭṭelāʿāt-e Sīāsī-Eqteṣādī (227–230)
- Amīrkḥīzī, Esmāʿīl (1387), Qīām-e Āzarbāyjān va Sattār Khān, Tehrān: Enteshārāt-e Āydīn, ISBN 978-964-5592-57-6
- Rašīdī, Eḥsān (1385), Bāqerkhān Sālār-e Mellī, Rūznāmeh-ye Sharq
- Moore, Henry (1384), Moḥāṣereh-ye Tabrīz (be naql az ḵabargār-e vižeh-e mā) – Rūznāmeh-ye Times, 3 July 1909, Yād (77)
- Ġanī-Nežād, Mūsā (1385), Negāhī be andīsheh-hā-ye čapgarāyāneh dar nahżat-e Mašrūṭeh-ye Īrān, Rūznāmeh-ye Donyā-ye Eqteṣād
- Nāmaʿlūm (1398), Darbāreh-ye rūznāmeh-ye Mosāwāt, našrīyeh-ʾī Mašrūṭeh-ḵāh va estebdād-stīz, Khabar-gozārī-ye IRNA
- Daštakī-Niyā, Farhād (1396), Mollā Naṣreddīn va enqelāb-e Mašrūṭīyat-e Īrān (taḥlīlī bar cherāʾī va čegūnīgī-ye bāztāb-e enqelāb-e Mašrūṭīyat dar majalleh-ye Mollā Naṣreddīn), Jostārhā-ye Tārīḫī (16), archived from the original on 19 October 2021
- Barādarān Šokūhī, Sīrus (1376), Negarešī enteqādī bar kārkard-e Mašrūṭeh-ḵāhān-e Tabrīz dar yāzdah māh-e moḥāṣere az ḵelāl-e rūznāmeh-ye Amlāʿ Amū, orgān-e Anjoman-e Eslāmī-ye Tabrīz, Zabān o Adab-e Fārsī (34)
- Āyatī, ʿAṭā (1385), Enqelāb-e Mašrūṭeh-ye Īrān az negāh-e yek nezāmī-ye farānsevī (mosāferat-e Kāpten Ānjīnīor be Īrān va Bayn al-Nahrayn dar sāl-e 1908), Tārīḫ-e Moʿāṣer-e Īrān (39)
- Moṣaddeq Kātūzyān, Amīr (1388), "Mīrās-e ṣadsāleh-ye 'šahīd-e Āmrikāʾī-ye jonbeš-e Mašrūṭīyat-e Īrān'", رادیو فردا, Rādīo-e Ferdā
- Moḥammadī, Amīr-Reżā (1399), Šākheh-gol-e Naṣrānī; nemād-e āzādī va āzādegī, IRNA
- Panāhī, Aḥmad (1378–1379), Dar revāyatī boland, bā laḥẓeh-hā-ye enqelāb-e Mašrūṭeh, Čīstā (166–167)
- Mostaġāsī, Saʿīd (1385), Morġ-e saḥar, nāleh sar kon…, Hamshahrī Online
- Nāmaʿlūm (1396), Sattār Khān tanhā serial-e monāsebatī-ye daheh-ye Fajr šod / 2 asar-e jadīd dar rāh ast, Khabar-gozārī-ye Mehr
- Ārān, Zahrā (1386), Bāqerkhān bā moxtaṣṣāt-e āntrūpūmetrī, Hamshahrī Online
- Nāmaʿlūm (1392), Enqelāb nām-e kodām ḵīābān-hā rā ʿawaz kard?, ISNA
- Hasanli, Jamil (2006), At the Dawn of the Cold War: The Soviet-American Crisis over Iranian Azerbaijan, 1941–1946, Rowman & Littlefield Publishers, ISBN 0742540553
- Nāmaʿlūm (1393), Ḵāneh-ye Mašrūṭeh maʿrūf-tarīn va por-eftekhār-tarīn ḵāneh-ye tārīḫī-ye šahr-e Tabrīz, Mosaḥebeh. Bāšgāh-e Ḵabarnegārān-e Javān
- Nowrūz-Morādī, Kūroš (1381), Goẓāreš-e hamāyeš (az Tehrān tā Tabrīz bā ʿaṣā-ye Sayyed Jamāl al-Dīn Asadābādī) (goẓāreš-e jashn-e Mašrūṭīyat dar Tabrīz – Tābestān 1381), Payām-e Bahārestān (15)
- Nāmaʿlūm (1383), Goẓāreš: goẓāreš-e jashn-e sālgard-e enqelāb-e Mašrūṭīyat dar Tabrīz, Boḵārā (37)
- Nāmaʿlūm (1395), Fīlm-e mostanad-e ʿAyyār-e Mašrūṭeh be shabakeh-ye namāyeš-e ḵānegī rāh yāft, Khabar-gozārī-ye Dānešgāh-e Āzād-e Eslāmī
- Parvāneh, Nāder (1390), Tabrīz sangar-e Mašrūṭīyat, Ketāb-e Māh-e Tārīḫ o Joghrāfiyā (164)
- Moḵtārī, Reżā (1398), 9 ketābī keh bāyad darbāreh-ye Mašrūṭeh beḵwānīm, Khabar-gozārī-ye IRNA
- Aḥmadī, Ḥoseyn (1380), Tārīḫ-e 18 sāleh-ye Āzarbāyjān, Ketāb-e Māh-e Tārīḫ o Joghrāfiyā (46–47)
- ʿAzīzī, Moḥammad-Ḥoseyn (1385), Tārīḫ-e enqelāb-e Mašrūṭīyat taʾlīf-e Doḵtūr Mahdī Malekzādeh, Ḥāfeẓ (32)
- Dār al-Šafāʾī, Bahman (1399), Negāhī be tārīḫ-negārī-ye Mašrūṭeh – ghesmat-e avval, BBC Fārsī
- Bāqerī, Ḵosrow (1395), Negareš-hā-ye tārīḫī-ye professor Īravand Ābrāhāmiyān, Rādīo Zamāneh
- Zāhedī, Zāhedī, Moḥammad-Javād; Ḥeydarpūr, Moḥammad (1387), Jāmeʿeh-šenāsī-ye enzoā-ye rowšan-fekrān: (Naqd-e konš-hā-ye rowšan-fekrān-e ʿaṣr-e Mašrūṭeh tā pāyān-e saltanat-e Pahlavī-ye avval), Jāmeʿeh-šenāsī-ye Īrān 9 (1–2)
- Fīrḥī, Dāvūd (1391), Feqh va sīāsat dar Īrān-e moʿāṣer. Jeld-e 1 (Feqh-e sīāsī va feqh-e Mašrūṭeh), Tehrān: Nashr-e Ney, ISBN 978-964-185-251-3
- Zāreʿ, Ḥāmed (1399), Rāhnamā-ye ḵᵛāndan-e āthār-e Javād Ṭabāṭabāʾī, Khabar Online
