= Ali Monsieur =

Iranian politician (1879–1910)

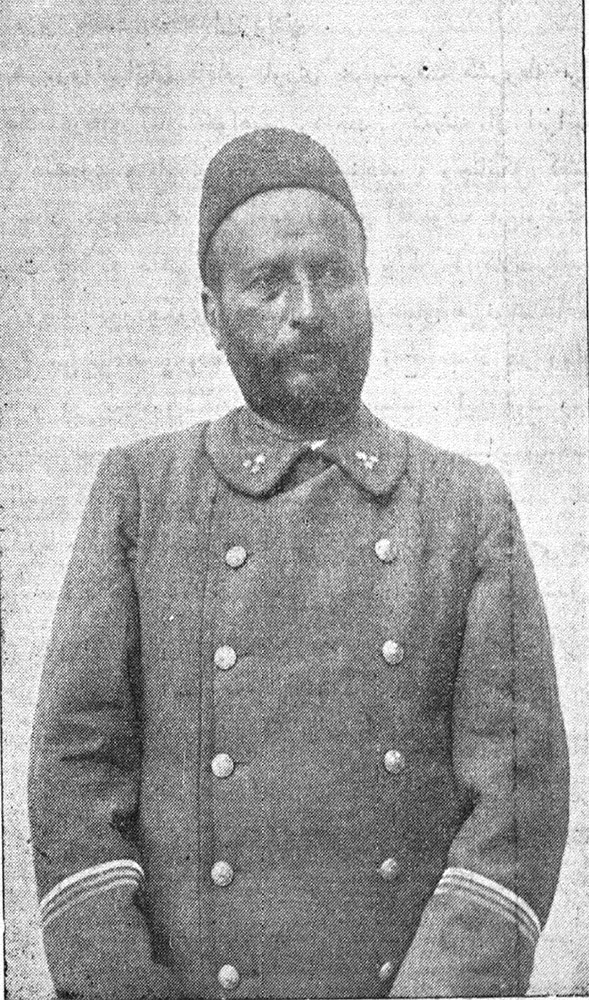
- Born: Tabriz, Qajar Iran
- Died: 1910; Tabriz, Qajar Iran
- Burial place: Tabriz, Qajar Iran
- Parent: Karbalayi Ali Haji Mohammad-Baqir oghlu Tabrizi

Ali Monsieur (Persian: علی مسیو; b. 1879, Qajar Iran –1910, Qajar Iran) — one of the founders and most active members of Ejtimaiyyun-e Amiyun (Socialists), and a participant in the Iranian Constitutional Revolution. Ali Monsieur played an active role in the establishment of numerous socialist organizations in Iran. Following the outbreak of the Constitutional movement, he initiated the formation of the Secret Center in Tabriz. Over time, this center became the most significant branch of Ejtimaiyyun-e Amiyun. The Ali Monsieur Museum, located in Tabriz, is currently operational, and its building dates back to the Qajar dynasty period.

He became known as "Monsieur" due to his knowledge of the French language.

== Life ==
Karbalayi Ali Monsieur was the son of Haji Mohammad-Baqir Tabrizi and was born in the Nobar district of Tabriz in Qajar Iran. Compared to other figures of the Constitutional movement, little information is available about Ali Monsieur. It is known that he was the only son of his family and, like his father, was engaged in trade. He owned a porcelain factory in Tabriz. Fluent in French, Ali Monsieur frequently traveled to Austria, the Caucasus, and Istanbul, and his political views were shaped by the impressions he gained during these trips. His knowledge of French allowed him to follow global developments closely, and he established connections with revolutionaries in the Caucasus. Ali Monsieur was well-versed in the history of the French revolutions and often drew examples from the struggle of French workers in his speeches. During his time in the Caucasus, he developed relations with Nariman Narimanov, who assisted him in forming a socialist party aimed at conducting revolutionary activities among Iranian Azerbaijanis working in Baku. During the Tabriz uprising and the early years of the constitutional monarchy—when the city's security apparatus was under the control of the mujahideen—he acted as a mediator in resolving disputes and conflicts.

=== Participation in the Constitutional Movement ===
In the work Nehzat-e Mashrutiyyat, references are made to the connection between the Secret Center and Ejtimaiyyun-e Amiyun, as well as their adherence to proclamations published by Lenin.

Together with his close associates Rasul Sadeghiani and Hajji Ali Davachi, Ali Monsieur established organizations with socialist content and translated the charter of the Russian Social Democratic Labour Party into Persian for Iranian revolutionaries.

Ahmad Kasravi, in his book The History of the Iranian Constitutional Revolution, wrote the following on this matter:

In Tabriz, Ali Monsieur, Hajji Ali Davachi, and Rasul Sadeghiani translated that charter into Persian and formed a group of mujahideen...They held the reins of this group in their own hands and managed its affairs.

During the initial stage of recruiting members to the Secret Center, personal contact was first established with suitable individuals, who were then subjected to various tests before being admitted into private or general cells. Strict confidentiality rules were observed within these organizations, and the locations of their meetings were kept completely secret. For this reason, the organization was named the Secret Center. The cells subordinate to the Center each comprised between 7 and 11 members. These members often met only in darkness to avoid recognizing each other. Members of each cell received instructions solely from their designated leader. Even the most dangerous orders issued by the central committee were executed without exception and with complete obedience.

The government's security forces—particularly those supported by feudal lords and affiliated clerics—were explicitly instructed to capture, torture, and execute party members, especially those belonging to the Secret Center.

Two notable examples of such persecution are mentioned in the book Ali Monsieur – The Leader of Tabriz's Secret Center:

Karim, a member of the Ejtimaiyyun-Amiyun Party, was known for his courage and fearlessness in carrying out the orders of the Central Committee. One night, while on a mission, he was captured by squads of farash (government enforcers). He was taken to the headquarters of the farashbashi, thrown into a cellar, and his hands and feet were nailed in four directions. Numerous candles were placed on his body and lit. As the candles burned out, he was interrogated and pressured to reveal the secrets of the party. When the torturers failed to extract any information, they dismembered him and ended his life.

Another incident involved a militant named Hasan Agha, a member of the Secret Center. After his capture, one of his legs was shackled and his hands tied, and he was whipped daily in an attempt to extort money from him. One day, a farash released a scorpion from a box near the prisoner's leg and once again demanded money. Hasan Agha killed the scorpion with his free left foot. Enraged, the farash beat him more severely, shouting: “You wretch! You dare kill the government's scorpion? You Babi, you kill the government's scorpion?!”

Karim Tahirzadeh Behzad, in his memoirs, recorded one of Ali Monsieur's first speeches to members of Ejtimaiyyun-Amiyun. He wrote the following about the event:

We were informed, using a special code, to gather in the Armenian quarter. According to the instructions, only two members from each group were allowed to attend. At the appointed time, we assembled in a large hall in the Armenian district. As usual, in complete darkness, an unrecognizable figure addressed the participants, beginning with this couplet:

‘When a cat is cornered and helpless, It strikes out at the tiger's eye with its claws.’

Then he continued: ‘We do not fear danger, for we are already within danger. We have taken up arms, but unlike tyrants, we do not wish to kill innocent people. We have taken upon ourselves a heavy responsibility...and we will fulfill it. Our enemies are powerful, but they lack faith in their own cause. We, though we may appear weak, act with conviction. My dear comrades, you must know that you have set foot on a highly dangerous path. To pave the road to freedom, one must be ready to sacrifice one's life...If among you there are those who fear for their life or property, let them resign at once, for this is a perilous task. Dangerous missions may be assigned to you, and you will be obliged to carry them out. If any sign of negligence, compromise, or refusal to carry out duties is observed, it will be treated as dereliction and punished severely...You are not here to eat, drink, and revel, but to claim your right to life and freedom. Our people have been in bondage for hundreds of years. You have gathered here to break these chains...

The speaker then gave a brief account of the Great French Revolution and concluded his speech. The participants dispersed. Later, it became known that the speaker was Ali Monsieur himself.

There is no precise information regarding the circumstances of Ali Monsieur's death. He was reportedly 44 years old when killed by the Russians. It is, however, known that the Russian Imperial Army entered Tabriz with the cooperation of Britain and the consent of the Qajar court. After the entry of Russian troops, several leaders and commanders of the Tabriz uprising, including key members of Ejtimaiyyun-Amiyun, were arrested. Some of them were sentenced to death.

Ali Monsieur's house was looted, and his two sons, aged 18 and 16, were arrested. On the 10th of Dey, 1290 (31 December 1911), Tabriz fell into a state of deep mourning. That day, eight individuals surrounded by Russian troops were taken to the execution ground. Among them were Ali Monsieur's two sons. Those executed were: Mirza Ali Siqqet al-Islam, Sheikh Salim Zia al-Ulama, Mohammadqulu Khan, Sadeq al-Molk, Agha Mohammad Ebrahim, as well as Ali Monsieur's 18-year-old son Hasan and his 16-year-old brother Qadir.

Ahmad Kasravi describes this event as follows:

It was an utterly heartbreaking and soul-crushing scene... On one side stood the looming threat of death, on the other, the nation's struggle amidst despair and calamity — only God could know the depth of the anguish in their hearts at that moment. Mirza Ali Siqqet al-Islam tried to console everyone, to calm their fears and sorrow...

At last, the gallows were erected. First, poor Sheikh Salim tried to speak, but a cruel Russian officer struck his face with slaps and punches to silence him. The executioners placed the rope around his neck and kicked away the stool beneath him. Second, Mirza Ali Siqqet al-Islam was called forward; he stood without fear and stepped onto the stool with courage. The third was Zia al-Ulama, who turned to the Russian officer and asked in Russian: ‘What crime have we committed?... Is it a crime to fight for our own homeland?’ The executioners tied his hands behind his back and forced him onto the stool.

Next came Sadeq al-Molk in the fourth place. Fifth was Agha Mohammad Ebrahim, who stepped onto the stool of his own accord and put the rope around his neck. The sixth was Qulu Khan — an elderly man — who was also called forward. Seventh was Hasan, the 18-year-old son of Ali Monsieur. The brave young man climbed the stool and shouted loudly: ‘Long live the Constitution!’ Finally, 16-year-old Qadir was brought forth, and (due to a special grudge against Ali Monsieur) he too was forced onto the stool and the rope was placed around his neck.

The Russians, seeking to display their cruelty, did not blindfold any of them, nor did they remove the others from sight while each was hanged. Thus, the brothers were executed before each other's eyes. As can be seen from photographs, the executioners deliberately threw the rope in such a way that the condemned would not die instantly. Many of them endured agonizing suffering for several minutes before life left them.

== Memory ==
In August 2024, a documentary film dedicated to Ali Monsieur was premiered in the city of Tabriz. During the presentation of the documentary, which was produced under the direction of Masud Mir, he stated:

I am not a historian, and I do not have the confidence to stretch my legs before the great historians of this province. I simply had an interest in documentary filmmaking, and I came across the story of Ali Monsieur purely by chance during the 2018 event when Tabriz was declared the "Shia capital of the Islamic world." I am a journalist, and during my trip to Tabriz, I visited Ali Monsieur's house. There, I asked myself how it was possible that I had never heard of this great personality before. Unfortunately, I hadn't even heard his name ... Those who study history know well that history is always written by the victors. In my opinion, the history of Ali Monsieur and, in general, the Constitutional Revolution is a completely gray area.

The house where Ali Monsieur and his comrades hid during the Constitutional Revolution now functions as the Ali Monsieur Museum or Ali Monsieur House.

== Photos ==
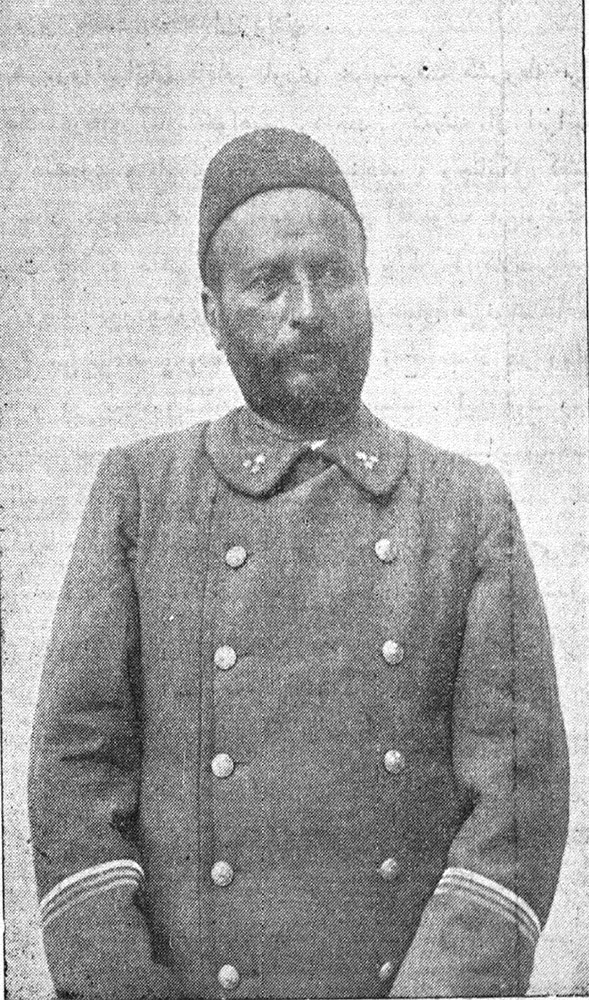
Ali Monsieur

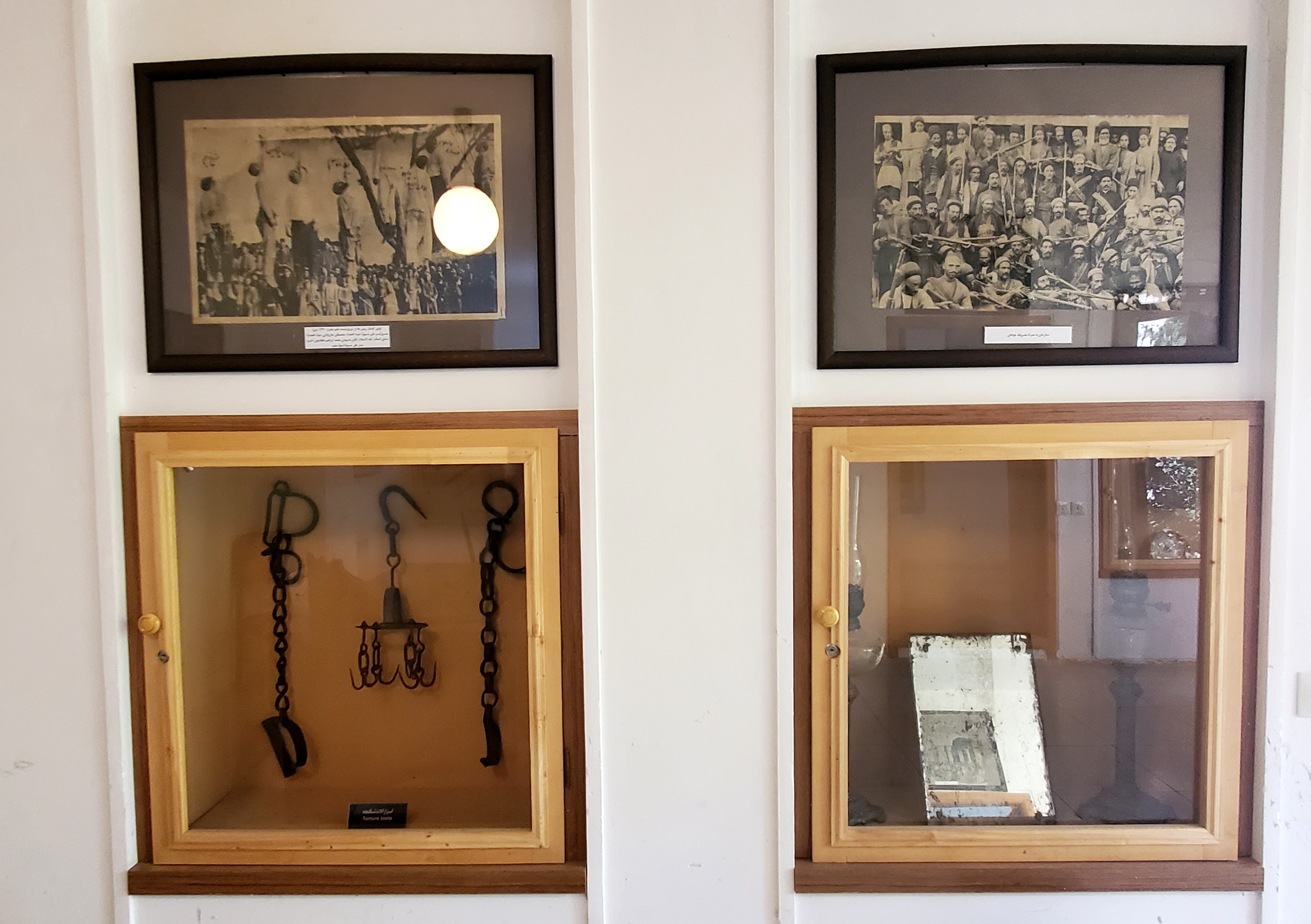
Ali Monsieur House.

== See also ==
- Hajji Ali Davachi
- Hasan Sharifzadeh

== Sources ==
- Amīrkḥīzī, Esmāʿīl (1387), Qīām-e Āzarbāyjān va Sattār Khān, Tehrān: Enteshārāt-e Āydīn, ISBN 978-964-5592-57-6
- Kasravī, Aḥmad (1395), Tārīkh-e Mashrūṭeh-ye Īrān
- Kasravī, Aḥmad (1319), Tārīḫ-e Hījdah-sāla-ye Āzarbāyjān
- Nāmvar, Raḥīm (1958), Tārīḫ-e Enqelāb-e Mašrūṭiyyat, Enteshārāt-e Čāpār
- Behzād, Karīm Ṭāherzādeh (1334), Qīām-e Āzarbāyjān dar Enqelāb-e Mašrūṭiyyat-e Īrān, Tehrān: Enteshārāt-e Eqbāl
