= 1871 in Iran =

- Decades
- See also: Other events of 1871; Years in Iran

The following lists events that happened during 1871 in Qajar era.

== Incumbents ==
- Monarch: Naser al-Din Shah Qajar

== Births ==
- January 21 – Gahraman Mirza Salur, Iranian historian.
- August 15 – Ebrahim Hakimi, Prime Minister of Iran.
- ? – Abd al-Hosayn Ayati, Iranian missionary of the Baha'i Faith, journalist, author and teacher.
- ? – Badíʻu'lláh Effendí, One of the sons of Bahá'u'lláh, the founder of the Bahá'í Faith..
- ? – Hajj Nematollah, Iranian Kurdish scholar.
- ? – Hajji Ali Davachi, Iranian revolutionary.
- ? – Hoseyn Khan Baghban, Iranian revolutionary.
- ? – Mohsen Sadr, Persian politician.
