= Hajji Ali Davachi =

Iranian revolutionary

Hajji Ali Davachi or Hajji Ali Türki
- Born: 1871; Tabriz, Qajar Iran
- Died: 1912 (aged 40–41); Tabriz, Qajar Iran
- Burial place: Tabriz, Tabriz, Qajar Iran

Hajji Ali Turki, also known as Hajji Ali Davachi (born 1871, Tabriz – d. 1912), was a member of the National Association of Azerbaijan and one of the founders of the Secret Center. He was the second most prominent figure in the Secret Center after Ali Monsieur. By profession, he was a pharmacist and specialized in the field of chemistry. Ali was among the earliest supporters of the Constitutional Movement and served as the head of the board of the Secret Center.

== Life ==
Ali was born in 1871 in the city of Tabriz. He was the owner of the Nasiri Pharmacy in Tabriz and imported and sold important medicines from abroad. As one of the early supporters and leaders of the Constitutional Movement, Ali was known by the epithet “the Danton of the Constitutional Revolution.” A close associate of Sattar Khan, Hajji Ali was wounded in the wrist during a battle when Samad Khan Shuja al-Dawla attacked Tabriz, and he underwent treatment for several months. After the Iranian Cossack Brigade commander Lyakhov bombarded the Majlis, he attacked the French consulate in Tabriz together with Mirza Hossein Vaez and Seyyed Hasan Sharifzadeh.

Following the triumph of the Constitutional Revolution, Ali dedicated himself to promoting education and culture. At the Sa'adat School, which operated during this period, he reportedly had around 500 students. He also briefly served as the commander of the police forces of Tabriz. Along with Mirza Ali Siqqat al-Islam Tabrizi, he was one of the key planners and leaders of the Constitutional Movement. The historian Ahmad Kasravi described him as one of the principal minds behind the movement. In all existing recollections about him, he is portrayed as a courageous, frontline fighter with good character and firm resolve.

== Death ==
In the months leading up to the [[Russian occupation of Tabriz|Russian massacres in Tabriz in December 1911]], Hajji Ali had resigned from his post and was living quietly at home, not directly involved in the events. Nevertheless, Samad Khan's men arrested and imprisoned him. He was later hanged alongside Mirza Ahmad Soheili in the Bagh-e Shomal area of Tabriz. His house was also blown up and destroyed.

Regarding this event, Ahmad Kasravi wrote:

In 1288 AH (1909 CE), after the Russians entered Tabriz, Sattar Khan and Baqir Khan took refuge in the Ottoman consulate. Along with them, the late Ali Monsieur also sought refuge in that consulate. It appears that these individuals had not directly participated in the war against the Russians, and for that reason, had not fled the city. Hajji Ali, who maintained friendly relations with Iranian Cossack officers in Tabriz, entered the Russian consulate through their mediation and received a guarantee of safety from the consul, Mr. Miller. However, when Samad Khan entered the city, his men captured Hajji Ali, subjected him to severe torture, and imprisoned him. He was later sent to Bagh-e Shomal. The Russians, known for their harsh treatment of enemies, did not forgive him and executed him. Around that time, his house was attacked, looted, and eventually demolished with dynamite.

== Views of Others on Hajji Ali ==
Seyyed Hasan Taqizadeh remarked the following about him:

The only crime of the late Hajji Ali was his patriotism and support for the constitutional cause. A man who had escaped from Samad Khan’s prison once told me that Hajji Ali, pointing to the chain around his neck, had said: ‘So-and-so! This chain is the necktie of patriots and lovers of freedom.’

Ahmad Kasravi also wrote:

Tabriz was not like Tehran; here, there were several thousand experienced, disciplined, and well-prepared fighters. We will see how brave and capable individuals emerged from among them. Among the leaders of the freedom movement were figures like Ali Monsieur, Hajji Ali Davachi, and others who never hesitated to make any sacrifice, disregarding their lives and possessions.

Edward Browne noted:

During the second constitutional period, he devoted much of his time to the promotion of education. Thanks to his considerable efforts, the Sa’adat School—one of the best, most disciplined, and highest-quality schools in Tabriz, with around five hundred students—continued its activities. The students of this school were often literate, patriotic, talented, and skilled with the pen.

== See also ==
- Siege of Tabriz (1908–1909)
- Hoseyn Khan Baghban

== Sources ==
- Kasravi, Aḥmad Kasravī (1395), Tārīkh-e Mashrūṭeh-ye Īrān, Sherkat-e Nashr-e Ketāb-e Hormes
- Browne, Edward (1361), Nāmeh-hā-yi az Tabrīz. Tarjomeh: Hasan Javādī. Chāp-e dovvom, Tehran: Sherkat-e Sahāmī-ye Enteshār
- Çingizoğlu, Ənvər (2011), Məşrutə ensiklopediyası, Bakı
- Khamāchī, Behruz (1398), Shahr-e man Tabriz, Təbriz: Nedā-ye Shams
