= Hasan Sharifzadeh =

Iranian constitutionalist (d. 1908)

Seyyed Hasan Sharifzadeh Tabrizi Hasan Sharifzadeh
- سید حسن شریف‌زاده تبریزی
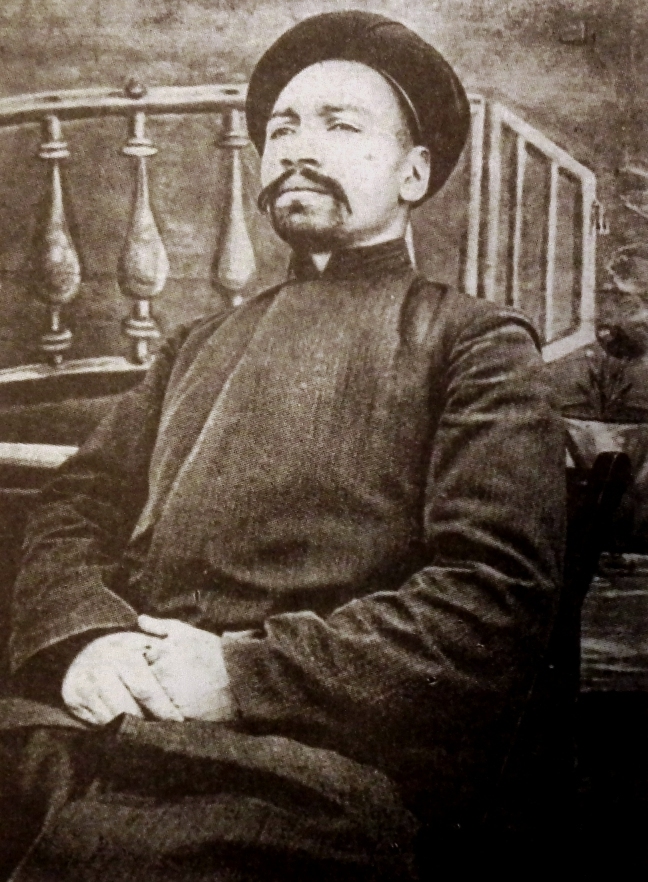
- Born: Tabriz, Qajar Iran
- Died: 22 August 1908; Tabriz, Qajar Iran
- Burial place: Tabriz
- Parent: Seyyed Mohammad Sharif al-Ulama Tabrizi

Hasan Sharifzadeh or Seyyed Hasan Sharifzadeh Tabrizi was a teacher at the Tabriz Memorial School, a founding member of the Secret Center and the National Association of Azerbaijan, and a supporter of the Constitutional Movement. He participated in the 1908–1909 Tabriz uprising and was assassinated during the events of the uprising under circumstances that remain unclear.

== Life ==
Sharifzadeh was born in the city of Tabriz into a clerical family. His father, Seyyed Mohammad Sharif al-Ulama Tabrizi, was one of the prominent scholars and literary figures of Azerbaijan. Hasan Sharifzadeh received his initial education from his father and soon distinguished himself for his intellectual talent. He later enrolled in the Tabriz Memorial School, where he simultaneously learned French. He subsequently pursued studies abroad, during which he also acquired knowledge of English.

Upon returning to Tabriz, he became one of the teachers at the Memorial School and later taught at several other institutions that emerged following the 1908 uprising. According to Seyyed Hassan Taqizadeh, Sharifzadeh was a well-loved teacher among his students. Even before the Constitutional Movement had begun or achieved victory, he was already recognized for his liberal and reformist character. After the outbreak of the uprising, he joined the ranks of the constitutionalist fighters—known as mujahideen—and became a member of the National Association of Azerbaijan.

=== Activities ===
From his youth, Sharifzadeh began to distance himself from the clerical family background and engaged with reformist political currents. Despite his father's disapproval and financial difficulties, he remained committed to his chosen path. Ahmad Kasravi portrayed him as someone who understood the dynamics of modern society and strove to contribute to its progress. He was described as one of the most talented political minds within the Secret Center and as a close friend of Howard Baskerville.

At the beginning of the Constitutional Revolution, after the Iranian National Assembly was shelled by Lyakhov, Sharifzadeh, along with other constitutionalists, took refuge in the French consulate. During his stay there, he reportedly suffered from depression. In a letter to his friends, he wrote that he was unable to work or rest and suffered from constant inner turmoil.

Alongside his teaching activities, Sharifzadeh played an active role in organizing student and faculty meetings and gatherings. He was regarded as one of the most prominent orators among the constitutionalists, known for delivering powerful speeches in Azerbaijani Turkic. Due to his contributions—particularly during the Tabriz uprising—Sharifzadeh was considered one of the most active members of the movement and was selected by the National Association to be part of the delegation negotiating with Abdolmajid Mirza Qavanlu-Qajar. On that occasion, he addressed the people of Tabriz with the following words:

O people! Just as a dog becomes more ferocious after tasting blood, these unscrupulous men, having fed off your suffering, have become wild—and now they have turned on the people themselves.

In another powerful speech in Azerbaijani Turkish, he addressed government officials in Tabriz:

Today you are the true defenders of the people's rights and the guardians of their lives and property. You are the real pillars of civilized society. Just as you serve the homeland and nation with sincerity and dedication, we—the people of Azerbaijan—are obliged to protect your social standing and further enhance your moral authority.

In addition to his cultural and educational endeavors, Sharifzadeh was one of the core members of the Secret Center, which was founded by him along with Hajji Ali Davachi, Ali Monsier, and a few others. The center was tasked with organizing the activities of the constitutionalists. It has been claimed that the center occasionally clashed with other factions of the movement due to ideological differences, such as over social democracy or pan-Turkism.

=== Assassination ===
On 22 August 1908, Sharifzadeh and Haji Mehdi Kuzehkounani were shot by two individuals near the French consulate in Tabriz after leaving the National Association of Azerbaijan. Although he was taken to the French consulate for medical help, Sharifzadeh died there approximately half an hour later.

Sources do not provide definitive information regarding who killed him or why. Some claim he was assassinated by two radicals from the Islamic Assembly. According to Behzad Taherzadeh, he was shot by a drunk supporter of Sattar Khan named Abbasali, who later turned himself in and expressed remorse. Nevertheless, the constitutionalists found him guilty and executed him.

Howard Baskerville, who had taught alongside Sharifzadeh at the Memorial School, joined the constitutionalist ranks following Sharifzadeh’s death. He too lost his life during the uprising.

== See also ==
- Hajji Ali Davachi
- Hoseyn Khan Baghban

== Sources ==
- Mojtahedi, Mahdi (1379), Rijāl-e Āzarbāyjān, be koshesh-e Gholām-Rezā Ṭabāṭabāyī Majd, Enteshārāt-e Zarrin
- Siegel, Evan (1393), Seyyed Hasan Sharifzadeh: Ozv-e Markaz-e Gheybi-ye Tabriz va Rafiq-e Howard Baskerville (PDF), Tahlili-Siasi 1(16)
- Emīrkẖīzī, Esmāʾīl (1379), Qiyām-e Āzarbāyjān va Sattārkhān, Nāgar
- Kasravī, Aḥmad (1319), Tārīkh-e Mashrūṭeh-ye Īrān, jild dovvom
