= Hoseyn Khan Baghban =

Iranian constitutionalist commander (1871–1909)

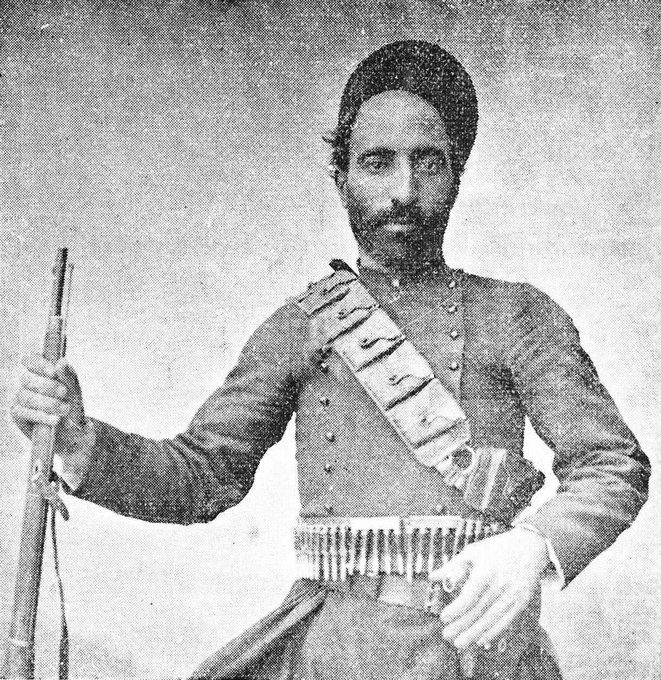
- Born: 1871; Sardrud, Qajar Iran
- Died: 1909 (aged 37–38); Tabriz, Qajar Iran
- Burial place: Davachi cemetery, Tabriz, Qajar Iran
- Parent: Karbalaʾi Mohammad Ali

Hoseyn Khan Baghban, (Persian: حسین خان باغبان; 1871 – 1909) also known as Karbalaʾi Hoseyn Khan Eloğlu or Garib Hoseyn was a principal commander of the constitutionalist forces in Tabriz during the Iranian Constitutional Revolution and one of the key defenders of the city during the Tabriz uprising.

== Life ==
Hoseyn was born in 1871 in the village of Sardrud near Tabriz, into the family of Karbalaʾi Mohammad Ali. Together with his younger brother Hasan, he engaged in agricultural work. He later moved to the city of Tabriz and settled in the Leilaabad district. During the initial phase of the Constitutional movement in Iran, he worked as a gardener at the house of the renowned constitutionalist merchant Mirza Aqa Farshchi. Although little is known about this period of his life, it is presumed that he was influenced by the worldview of Mirza Aqa Farshchi. Subsequently, he joined the ranks of the Sarfaraz Lutis of Tabriz and, during the uprising and the prolonged siege of the city, was appointed commander of the constitutionalist fighters from Leilaabad. A close associate of Sattar Khan, Hoseyn Khan was entrusted by him with the protection of the National Association of Azerbaijan and the Tabriz Bazaar—both of which were strategically crucial for the political and economic continuity of the uprising.

Ahmad Kasravi, in his seminal work The History of the Iranian Constitutional Revolution, reports that he once saw Hoseyn Khan Baghban with his fighters passing through the Hokmavar district of Tabriz. Kasravi notes that Hoseyn Khan habitually carried nine bullets and, when asked about it, would reply, "Do you think I’m going to kill more than nine people?".

=== Death ===
During the Tabriz uprising, some neighborhoods of the city were controlled by constitutionalists, while others remained under the control of anti-constitutionalist forces loyal to Mohammad Ali Shah Qajar. At this stage, Sattar Khan launched a series of military operations to capture the entire city. On 10 October 1908, constitutionalist forces seized the Sheshgelan and Baghmisheh quarters and began operations to take control of the Davachi district. Following these actions, on 11 October and afterward, they also captured the Sar Khāb and Davachi districts. Eventually, Prince Abdol Majid Mirza abandoned the city to the constitutionalists and retreated to Basmancheh. Hoseyn Khan Baghban was killed during these battles.

At the time of his death, Hoseyn Khan was leading an assault launched from the Bazaar of Tabriz. It is believed that he was first wounded in the leg and sought refuge in a caravanserai near a bridge. Surrounded by cavalrymen from Marand, who were aware of his reputation, they initially attempted to capture him alive by trying to breach the wall. According to Mohammad Baqir, the constitutionalists searching for Hoseyn Khan assumed that he had only been wounded and had escaped, so they ceased their search and withdrew. During this time, Hoseyn Khan managed to kill three of the cavalrymen with his revolver before running out of ammunition. He was subsequently shot multiple times in the head and killed.

According to the Anjoman newspaper, Hoseyn Khan was initially buried in the cemetery of the Davachi district. However, his only son and heir, Hāji Shāhid Azizpour, later transferred his remains to the city of Qom when a school was constructed at the original burial site. During subsequent urban development projects in Qom, his grave and the mausoleum built over it were destroyed.

=== Legacy ===
A bust of Hoseyn Khan is currently on display at the Constitution House of Tabriz. He has been the subject of writings by Haji Mohammad Baqir, Ahmad Kasravi, Dr. Salamullah Javid, and Mohammad Reza Afiyat. The prominent Iranian Azerbaijani scholar and professor Dr. Mohammad-Taqi Zehtabi was the first to compose a poem in verse recounting Hoseyn Khan's life and military struggle. This work was published in Iraq between 1977 and 1979. Following the Iranian Revolution, the poem was reprinted in Iran using offset printing and attracted considerable public interest. A revised and expanded edition was published again in Tabriz in 1996.

After Hoseyn Khan's death, elegies and mourning verses were composed by the people. Both Dr. Salamullah Javid and Dr. Mohammad-Taqi Zehtābi have documented this in their works. Mohammad Baqir wrote the following about him:

This brave young man was extremely kind-hearted and talkative. He never hesitated to give money to the poor and destitute. He was courageous and fearless, always taking the front lines in every battle. Fear never found its way into his heart, and betrayal was foreign to his sincere nature.

== See also ==
- Hajji Ali Davachi
- Hasan Sharifzadeh

== Sources ==
- Yazdāni, Sohrāb (1376), Kasravī va tārīkh-e Mashrūṭeh-ye Īrān. Tehrān: Nashr-e Nī. ISBN 964-312-344-8., Tehrān: Nashr-e Ney
- Yazdāni, Sohrāb (1388), Mojāhedān-e Mashrūṭeh, Tehrān: Nashr-e Ney, ISBN 978-964-185-083-0
- Jalālī Farāhānī, Aḥmad (1385), Gozarī kūtāh dar Khāneh-ye Mashrūṭeh dar masīr-e tārīkh, Īrān
- Ḥājīlū, Esfandiyār (1393), Ḥoseyn Khān Bāqbān (El-oğlu)
