= Mansur High School =

Coordinates: 38°04′13″N 46°18′31″E

- منصور مدرسه‌سی دبیرستان منصور
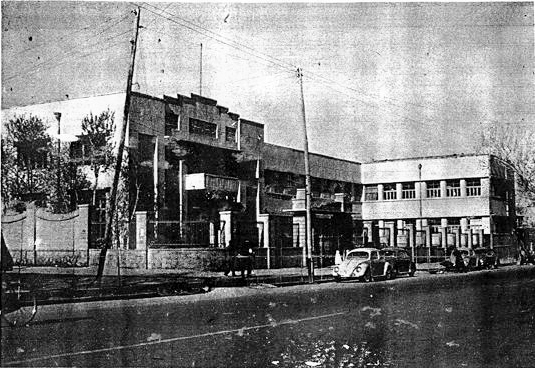

Location
- Imam Khomeini St. Tabriz; Iran

Information
- School type: Public
- Founded: 1945
- Founder: Sayyed Ja'far Pishevari
- Grades: 6-12 (also 9-12)

Mansur High school or Taleqani High School (in South Azerbaijani: منصور مدرسه‌سی, in Persian: (دبیرستان منصور (طالقانی) is a high school located in city center of Tabriz. A reconstruction of the main building started in 2012.

== See also ==
- American Memorial School in Tabriz
- Dar ol-Fonoon
- Higher education in Iran
