= American Memorial School in Tabriz =

Public school in Tabriz, Iran

American Memorial School of Tabriz
- مدرسه مموریال آمریکایی تبریز
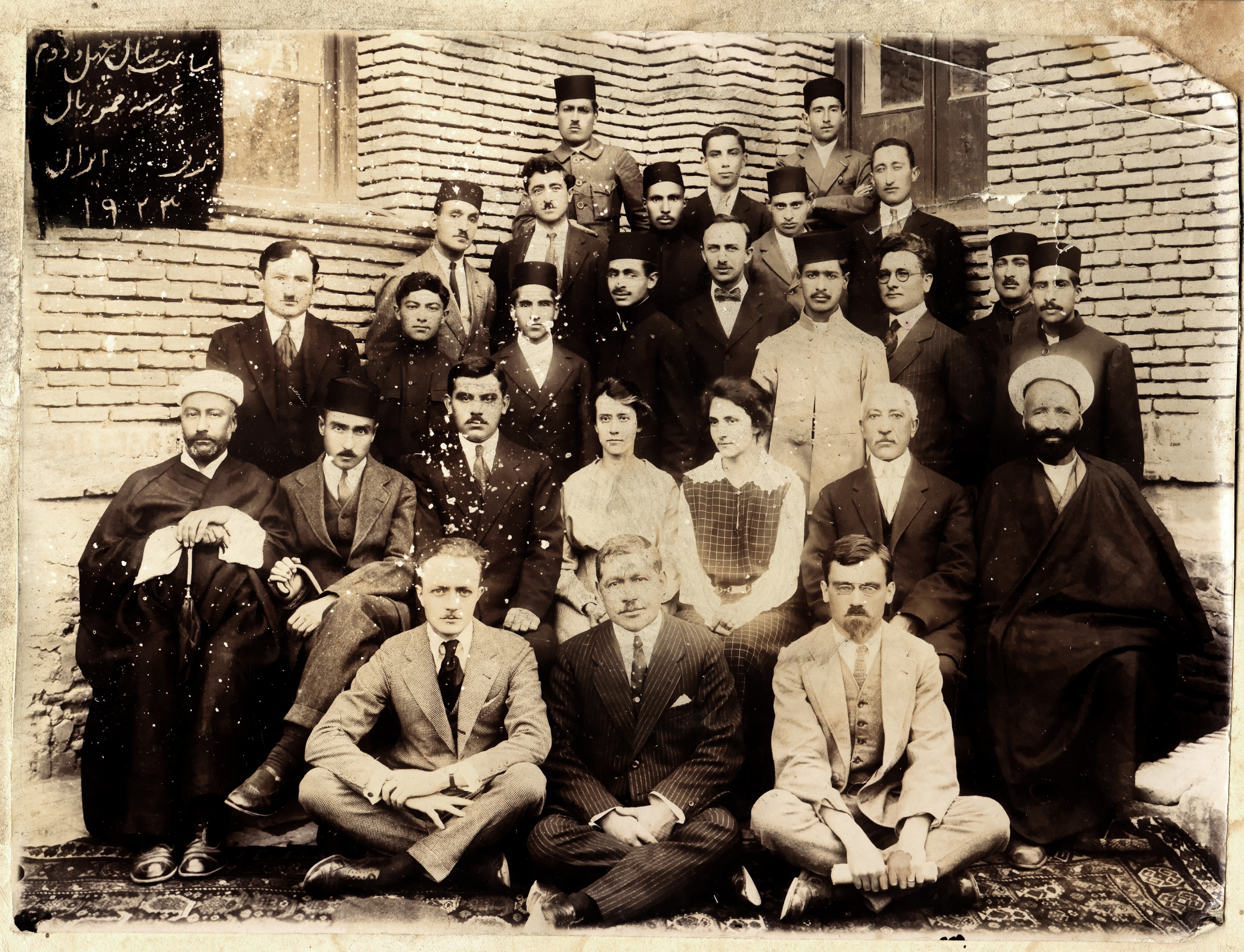
- Photograph taken at the start of the 42nd academic year at Memorial School on 30 August 1923. Some details concerning this photograph can be found on the black square in the upper-left corner of the image.

Location
- Tabriz, Iran
- 38°04′12″N 46°17′08″E

Information
- School type: Public School
- Founded: 1881
- Gender: Co-Educational

American Memorial School of Tabriz (Persian: مدرسه مموریال آمریکایی تبریز) was established in 1881 during the Qajar era in Tabriz, Iran. It is one of the most prominent schools of its kind. In 1935–1936, following Reza Shah Pahlavi's order to nationalise all private schools, it was renamed Parvin High School (دبیرستان پروین) by Iran's Ministry of Education. Currently, the school is divided into three separate secondary schools; however, the main original building still remains, as part of Parvin School.

Notable Faculty

Howard Conklin Baskerville (10 April 1885 – 19 April 1909) was an American missionary teacher. His life ambition was to become a pastor. He worked as a teacher employed by the American missionaries at the American Memorial School in Tabriz, a Presbyterian mission school, and was killed during the Persian constitutional revolution in an attempt to break the siege of Tabriz. He is often referred to as the "American Lafayette of Iran" and the "American Martyr of the Iranian Constitutional Movement".

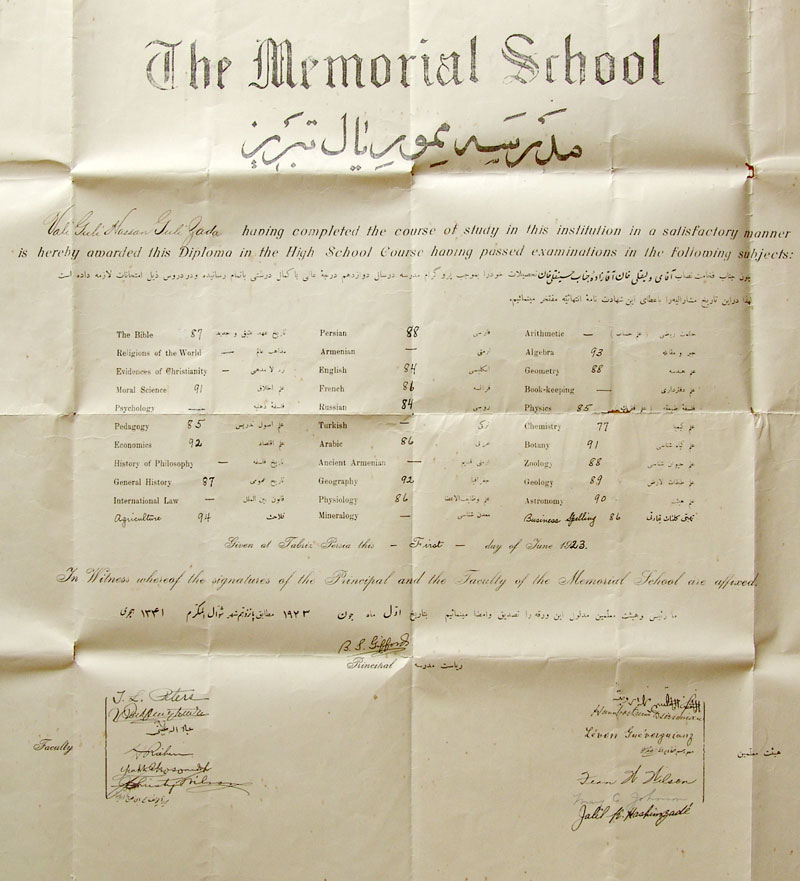
A graduation certificate, 1923

== Notable alumni ==
- Ahmad Kasravi
- Hassan Taqizadeh

== AMST FC ==
Tabriz American Memorial School had a professional football team. AMST football team participated in the Iranian championship Cup four times and reached the final three times.

== See also ==
- Howard Baskerville
- Mansur High School
