= Constitutionalization attempts in Iran =

1890s–1911 period of liberalization in Iran

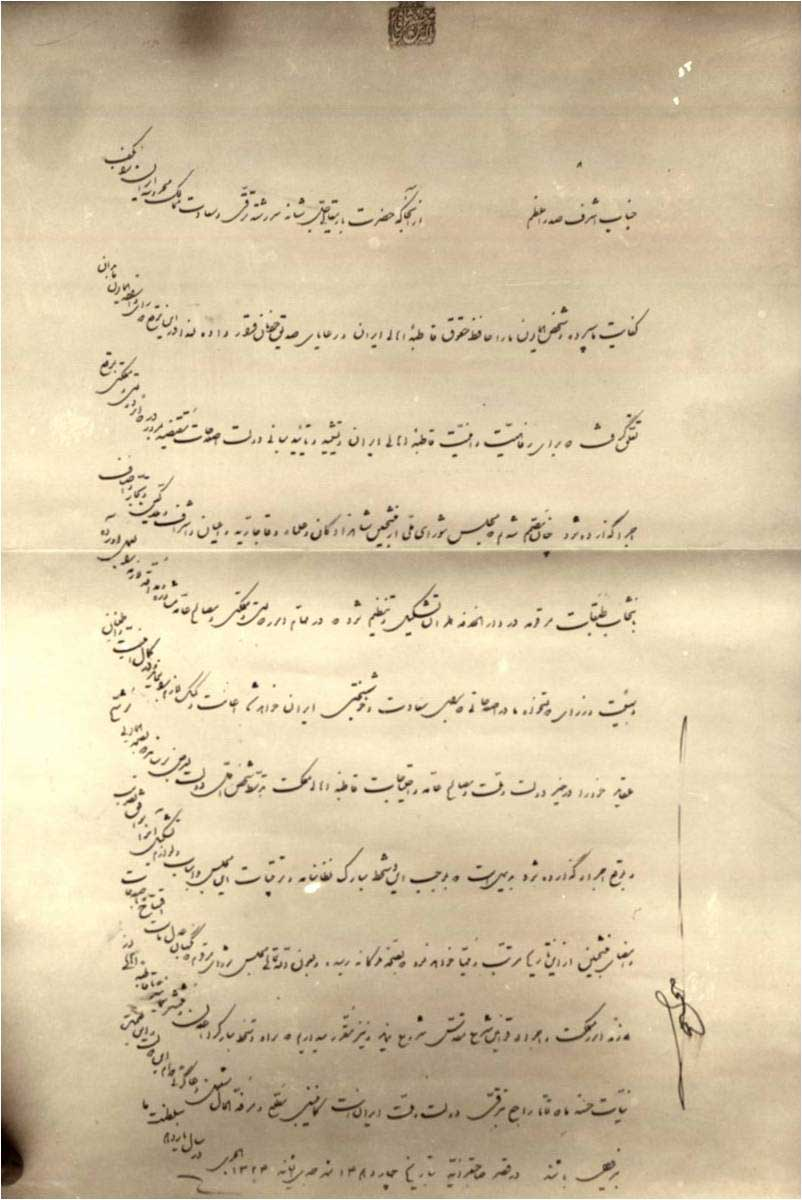
Mozaffar ad-Din Shah Qajar's 1906 firman proclaiming the constitutional monarchy

The Iranian Constitutional Revolution was a short-lived push for democratic rule in the form of a constitutional monarchy within a highly elitist yet decentralized society under the Qajars. The mounting disgust amidst the clergy, bazaaris, farmers, intellectuals, and other segments of the populace with respect to the Shah, policies during the end of the 19th and beginning of the 20th century illustrates a classic example of an environment ripe for protest, as a wide array of people in society felt an increasing need to express their grievances with an oppressive and largely autocratic government.

== Foundation and causes ==
While no concrete date has been agreed upon with respect to the origins of the Constitutional Revolution itself, the seeds for revolution were sown with increasing foreign influence within the country (namely British and Russian influence) during the 19th century. Various concessions granted to foreign powers by the Shah(s) ranging from capitulations to the Reuters Concession of 1872 created contempt and distrust amidst the clergy, bazaaris and merchants amongst others, but none proved more inflammatory than the Tobacco Règie of 1890, in which the Shah granted Britain a monopoly over the production, sale, and export of all Iranian tobacco.

Despite initially being kept secret, the agreement for the Tobacco Règie was eventually leaked and criticized through a series of articles published in late 1890 by a Persian newspaper in Constantinople, the capital of the Ottoman Empire. The agreement sparked unprecedented protest due to tobacco being a widely grown product within Iran that provided the livelihood for many landholders, shopkeepers, and exporters. Moreover, the clergy viewed it as fundamentally violating Islamic law as Iranian consumers and merchants were being implicitly coerced into buying and selling tobacco from and to the monopoly. The clergy's loathing of the Règie led to a coalition of massive protests led by the ulama (clergy) in the form of a tobacco boycott as well as street demonstrations. The government reacted by shooting into a non-violent crowd, resulting in even greater protests and culminating in the concession eventually being cancelled in 1892. The fiasco left more than a bad taste in the mouths of the citizenry; the Tobacco Règie resulted in several deaths as well as a debt of 500,000 pounds to the British.

=== Aftermath of the Tobacco Règie and economic downturn ===
In the aftermath of the botched Tobacco Règie, political instability reached a new apex with the assassination of Naser al-Din Shah Qajar in 1896. Despite some beliefs that the largely, if not entirely, autocratic, corrupt rule imposed by the Shah would end with his death, capitulations and concessions continued under Mozaffar ad-Din Shah Qajar. The failure of the Tobacco Règie worked to decrease the perceived stranglehold the British had on the region with respect to the other foreign powers, which led to the growing influence of Russian interests and new concessions granted to the Russian Empire.

The role of foreign influence in Iran (Persia) may have changed slightly following 1892, but the dynamics of Iran's domestic front remained severely bleak. A government now thoroughly in debt was spending its increasingly meager revenues (due to harsher, more detrimental concessions allotted to foreign powers) to pay for the Shah's luxurious lifestyle and needlessly expensive trips to Europe, both of which required more loans when the revenues ran short of the Shah's expenses. An already bankrupt government had become wholly dependent on foreign loans as the call for political reform became more and more prevalent. Inflation caused by a cholera epidemic, a bad harvest, and the disruption in trade caused by the 1905 Russo-Japanese War resulted in rapid price increases of vital goods such as bread and sugar, furthering the cries for reform.

=== First protests ===
In 1905 protests broke out over the collection of Iranian tariffs to pay back the Russian loan for Mozaffar ad-Din Shah's royal tour. In December 1905, two Persian merchants were punished in Tehran for charging exorbitant prices. They were bastinadoed (a humiliating and very painful punishment where the soles of one's feet are caned) in public. An uprising of the merchant class in Tehran ensued, with merchants closing the bazaar. The clergy following suit as a result of the alliance formed in the 1892 Tobacco Protest.

The two protesting groups sought sanctuary in a mosque in Tehran, but the government violated this sanctuary and entered the mosque and dispersed the group. This violation of the sanctity of the mosque created an even larger movement which sought refuge in a shrine outside Tehran. On 12 January 1906, the Shah capitulated to the demonstrators, agreeing to dismiss his prime minister and to surrender power to a new "house of justice," (the forerunner to the parliament). The Basti — protestors who take sanctuary in mosques — returned from the mosque in triumph riding royal carriages and hailed by a jubilant crowd.

In a scuffle in early 1906, the government killed a seyyed (descendant of Muhammad). A more deadly skirmish followed a short time later when the government's Cossack Brigade killed 22 protesters and injured 100. The bazaar closed again and the ulema went on strike, a large number of them taking sanctuary in the holy city of Qom. Many merchants went to the British embassy which agreed to offer protection to Basti in the grounds of their legation.

=== The Constitution ===
The revolution formally began in August 1906, when Mozaffar ad-Din Shah signed a royal decree which called for the election of a Constituent Assembly, known as “Constitution Day” in contemporary Iran. Preceded by protests headed by the three most respected mojtaheds in Tehran, Sayyed Abdallah Behbehani, Sayyed Muhammad Tabatabai, and Sheikh Fazlollah Noori, the call for a constitution was triggered by the Qajar government's poor response to economic upheaval (marked by government debt and high levels of inflation). Increasingly negative perceptions of the impact of Western countries led to increasing resentment amidst the Iranian citizenry, which in turn galvanized support in favor of a written constitution which would in turn allow for a means to check the Shah's power in the form of a legislature.

The Constituent Assembly, a group of delegates composed mainly of merchants, clerics, guild elders, and liberal notables, drafted the electoral law based on six classes (tabaqats) of the population, namely, Qajar princes, ulama and seminary students, nobles (a’yan) and notables (ashraf), well-established merchants, landowners with property of a certain minimum value, and guildsmen with a certain amount of income. Many professions of a lower socio-economic status, such as porters, laborers, and camel drivers, were excluded, and that the middle class guilds (who often chose members of the ulama as their representatives) were the dominant group with respect to electoral representation.

The law then said that the electorate was to be divided up into 156 constituencies, with 96 seats allocated to Tehran, displaying a disproportionate amount of representation in the city. Candidates had to be fluent in Persian (the fact that many people in Iran did not speak Persian made this a select group in itself), at least 25 years of age, and male, all of which in turn narrowed down the list of candidates and continued to detract from the notion of “democratic representation” through the Majles. It was also mandatory that all government officials must be Shi’a Muslims and that no law passed by the Majlis could be contradictory to Islamic Law (Shari'a).

The first Majles, or National Assembly, opened in October 1906, and consisted of more than sixty bazaaris, twenty-five clerics, and fifty landlords and notables, all of whom eventually divided into two parties called the Moderates (Mo’tadel) and the Liberals (Azadikhah).

The Majles was meant to be an integral part of the new constitution, as it was to have final say over various laws, decrees, budgets and concessions, while holding the authority to select cabinet ministers. Civil rights under the Majles were to be guaranteed to all citizens. Despite all of these intentions, and regardless of any role the Majles could have played within the Qajar government under pressure from the citizenry, the Constitutional Revolution began to weaken as quickly as it had begun.

=== 1908 coup ===
Despite optimistic beginnings given the level of pressure exhibited by the population through protests and demonstrations, by June 1908 the successor to Mozaffar ad-Din Shah, Mohammad Ali Shah Qajar felt politically strong enough to lead a military coup against the Majles, due to three factors. The first of these was the Anglo-Russian Convention of 1907, the second being the Majles’ attempts to reform the tax system and the third being a series of secular reforms proposed by certain Liberals. The beginning of the end of the Iranian Constitutional Revolution lay in the Anglo-Russian Convention of 1907, which was a defensive mechanism used by Britain to check Germany’s growing power in the region and in Europe by appeasing Russia (Iran was partitioned into three parts, with the north being given to Russia, the southwest to Britain and the rest to remain a neutral buffer zone). This greatly hindered the efforts of the constitutionalists as Iran’s autonomy was negated completely, and became the first factor which allowed the Shah enough room to operate and largely crush nationalist rhetoric.

The Majles’ attempts to reform the tax system further weakened the constitutionalists’ goals as the Majles sought to reform the tax system by taking authority away from local mostowfis (accountants) and giving it to the finance ministry, which in turn sparked hostility from the Shah and his supporters. The Shah's hostile response stemmed mainly from the Majles’ proposal to decrease the funding of the court treasury, which led to the deterioration of palace stables, armories, kitchens, warehouses, kilns, harem, and workshops, all of which contributed to forcing the Shah's hand in an eventual series of coups.

The third factor that enabled the Shah to force his hand was that certain Liberals’ proposed significant secular reforms and accused the clergy of acting within their own interests, leading Sheikh Fazlollah Nuri to break apart from his colleagues Seyyed Abdollah Behbahani and Mirza Sayyed Mohammad Tabatabai, and hold a rally accusing the Liberals of undermining religion. Sheikh Fazlollah Nuri was the third senior Mojtahed in Tehran at the time, the same individual who had previously joined with Behbahani and Tabatabai at the Sanctuary in Qom in leading a series of massive protests which the trio against the Shah which the three threatened to spread to Karbala and Najaf, leading to a virtual religious strike throughout Iran.

The protests in Qom were essential to paving the way for Constitutional reform, which in turn made the fragmentation of support amongst the ulama that much more devastating when Nuri dissented from his colleagues, as his students inevitably followed his example of rebuilding a relationship with the Shah. In June 1908, the Shah appointed the Cossack Brigade Commander, Colonel Liakhoff as the military governor of Tehran, at the same time bombarding the Majles building and placing Behbehani and Tabatabai under house arrest. In a series of two military coups (the first being a failure while the second achieved the Shah's ends) many nationalist leaders were either arrested or executed. The Qajar monarchy regained control over the government, maintaining only a limited form of the revolution's reforms and new institutions.

== Civil war and legacy of the Revolution ==
Despite the submission of most of Iran to royalist forces under the Shah, the city of Tabriz in northwestern Iran carried out a resistance against the Shah. Mojahedin (holy warriors) and Feda’iyan (self-sacrificers), numbering approximately one thousand volunteers, joined forces with Mohammad Vali Sepahdar (the leading feudal nobleman in Mazanderan), who defected from helping the Shah's forces retake Tabriz and was joined by not only his men but the Bakhtiyari tribes, some of whom were legitimately seeking political reform while others simply wanted control of the government themselves. The volunteers came from Iranian, Armenian, and Georgian communities and were organized by the Russian Social Democrats, Armenian nationalist Dashnaks and Iranian Hemmat Party, all three of which were revolutionary groups who focused on Iran after the 1905 revolution in Russia had been put down. By July 1909, the resistance groups began to close in on Tehran and the Shah was forced into exile, having his son Ahmad become Shah under a regent.

Despite the convening of a second Majles, which had reformed electoral laws by creating a single class of voters, the government was still plagued by bankruptcy and decentralization. Deeply distrustful of both Russia and the British, Iran consulted the U.S. government and brought in an American finance expert named William Morgan Shuster. Upon Morgan Shuster attempting to incorporate reforms which would enable more efficient tax collection with the help of an officer within the British Legation, Russia protested that use of a British officer in the above reforms was in direct violation of the Anglo-Russian Convention of 1907, which said that Russia would control any such officials in northern Iran. When Russia sent an ultimatum calling for the removal of Shuster in 1911 and began to advance troops toward Tehran, the revolution had officially died.

Despite the Iranian Constitutional Revolution not having the long-term success the populace hoped that it would, the financial reforms of the pre-existing feudal system, as well as significant liberalism in the political system, were byproducts of the constitutionalists’ efforts. The granting of greater civil jurisdiction in the courts, involvement of women in political demonstrations, and the future option of the Majles as a check against both domestic politics and foreign intrusion all remained after the revolution's demise. Finally, both the Tobacco Movement and the Constitutional Revolution showcased the strength of the combined forces of Iran's middle classes (especially merchants) and the clergy. A near repeat of this configuration occurred, with greater success, in 1979.

== Bibliography ==
- Abrahamian, E. “The Causes of the Constitutional Revolution in Iran.” International Journal of Middle East Studies, 10(3), 381-414.
- Abrahamian, E. Iran Between Two Revolutions, Princeton University Press, 84 (1982).
- Abrahamian, E. “Reform, Revolution, and the Great War.” A History of Modern Iran. New York: Cambridge University Press. (2008).
- Afshari, M. R. “The Pishivaran and Merchants in Precapitalist Iranian Society: An Essay on the Background and Causes of the Constitutional Revolution.” International Journal of Middle East Studies, 15(2), 133-155.
- Amuzegar, J. The Dynamics of the Iranian Revolution: The Pahlavis' Triumph and Tragedy. Albany: State University of New York Press. (1991).
- Bayat, M. Iran's First Revolution: Shi'ism and the Constitutional Revolution of 1905-1909.

New York: Oxford University Press. (1991).

- Bonakdarian, M. “Iranian Constitutional Exiles and British Foreign-Policy Dissenters,” 1908-9. International Journal of Middle East Studies, 27(2), (1995), 175-191.
- Gettleman, M. E., & Schaar, S. The Middle East and Islamic World Reader. New York: Grove

Press. (2003).

- Gheissari, A., & Nasr, V. Democracy in Iran: History and the Quest for Liberty. Oxford: Oxford University Press. (2006).
- Keddie, N. R., & Yann, R. Roots of Revolution: An Interpretive History of Modern Iran. New Haven: Yale University Press. (1981).
- Mackey, S. The Iranians: Persia, Islam and the Soul of a Nation, New York: Dutton, (1996), 150-155.
- Sohrabi, N. “Historicizing Revolutions: Constitutional Revolutions in the Ottoman Empire, Iran, and Russia, 1905-1908.” The American Journal of Sociology, 100(6), (1995), 1383-1447.
