= Davachi (Shotorban) =

Coordinates: 38.1077°N 46.2940°E

Davachi (Azerbaijani: Dəvəçi, Persian: دَوه‌چی, which literally translated into شتربان in Persian) is an old and historical district in North of Tabriz. Davachi district is limited to Eynali mountain and Sırxab district in North and east, Meydan Chayi in South and Amirkhiz district in west. Davachi used to have several caravansary, old houses and traditional baths, many of which have been destroyed.
