= National Association of Azerbaijan =

Early 20th-century grassroots organization

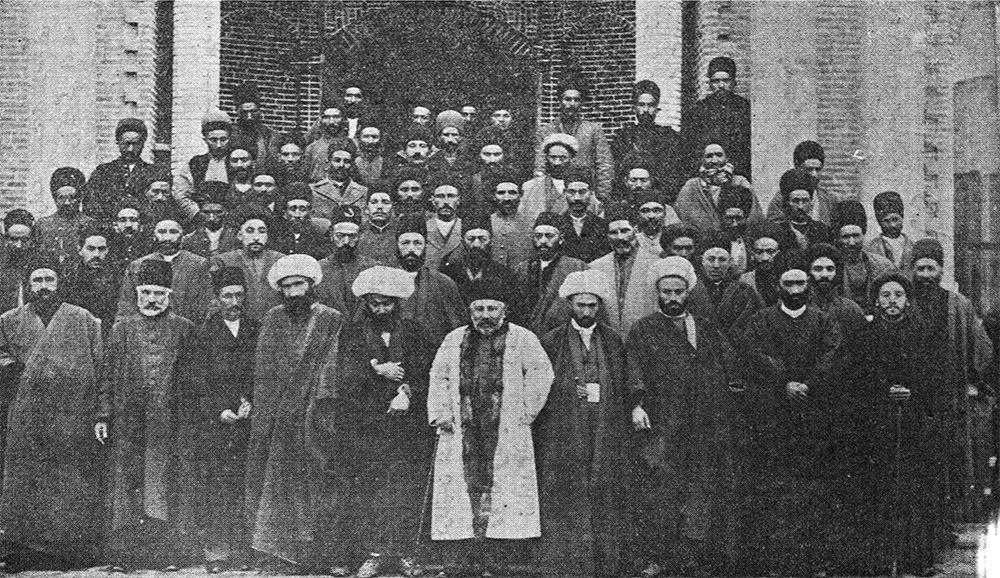
- Some leaders of the Tabriz movement and representatives of the association
- foundation: approximately 1906
- Termination: Probably 1909
- Target: Establishment of constitutional government
- Operational area: Azerbaijan (Iran)
- chief: Basir al-Saltanah
- deputy: Mirza Hossein Waez fa
- provision of budget: People and businessmen of Tabriz

The National Association of Azerbaijan (Persian: انجمن ایالتی آذربایجان), abbreviated as the Tabriz National Association, was a grassroots organization that emerged during the Constitutionalization attempts in Iran approximately on September 27, 1906. Initially known as the "Justice-Seeking Association of Tabriz," it played a pivotal role in the political, social, and governmental activities of Tabriz and its surrounding regions for over three years.

Founded with the aim of advocating justice, the association undertook a range of activities, including political mobilization and governance responsibilities in Tabriz and its neighboring areas. Through its endeavors and by mobilizing the populace, as well as exerting political pressure on the central government, the association played a fundamental role in the Persian Constitutional Revolution. It actively worked to counteract the obstructionist policies of Mohammad Ali Shah Qajar and contributed to the revival of constitutionalism.

The activities of the Tabriz Association came to an effective end with the entry of Russian forces and the occupation of Tabriz on 30 April 1909. Subsequently, some of its members relocated to Tehran and continued their involvement in other associations such as the "Tabriz" and "Democrat" societies, as well as in the Second Constituent Assembly of Iran fa. The impact of the Tabriz National Association remains significant in the historical narrative of the Constitutional Revolution and its efforts to thwart autocratic rule in Iran during that period.

== Foundation ==
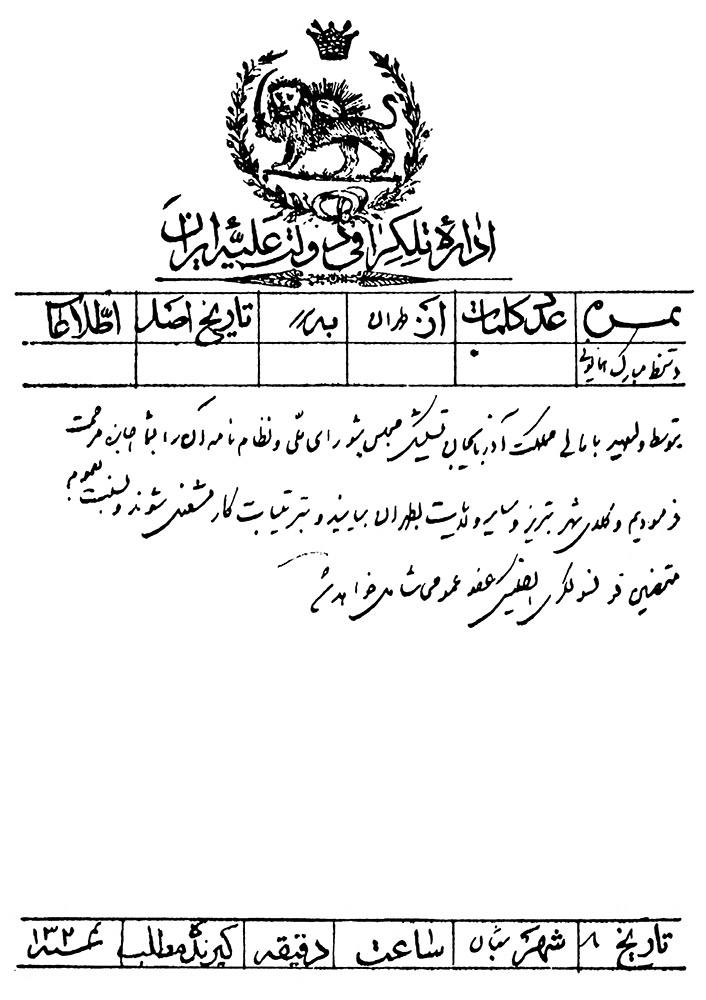
Telegram from Mozaffar ad-Din Shah Qajar to Mohammad Ali Mirza

Following the resistance and fortification of the people of Tabriz and the telegraph of Mozaffar al-Din Shah on Thursday, 26 September 1906, enthusiasm and fervor emerged among the people in response to the appointment of Mohammad Ali Mirza as the heir apparent. Activists of the Constitutional Revolution gathered to elect their representatives, effectively laying the formal foundation of the National Association of Azerbaijan.

Initially, the National Association of Azerbaijan was referred to as the "National Assembly" at its inception. However, a misunderstanding arose in Tehran among some representatives of the National Consultative Assembly, who objected to the use of Majlis (Assembly) for the association. Subsequently, with the consensus of Azerbaijani representatives in the National Consultative Assembly, the association was renamed as the "National Association of Azerbaijan" or simply the "Tabriz Association" to dispel any ambiguity.

Members of all social strata, including religious scholars, actively participated in the association. Additionally, some members of the "Socialists - Commoners" party, also known as the Social Democrat Party, engaged in activities through this association.
