= Secret Center =

Persian revolutionaries

Secret Center مرکز غیبی
- Leader: Ali Karbala-yi
- Founded: October 1906
- Headquarters: Tabriz
- Newspaper: Ganjeh-i Fonun; Azad; Mujahed
- Ideology: Revolutionary socialism
- Political position: Left-wing

Secret Center (Persian: مرکز غیبی, romanized: Markaz-e ḡāybī) was a revolutionary organization established in October 1906. Based in Tabriz, it played an important role in the Persian Constitutional Revolution. It had close ties to the Social Democratic Party.

== Activity ==
The Social Democratic Party or İctimaiyyun-Amiyyun had secret connections in Tabriz. Their 3 members from Baku - Mashadi Ismayil, Mashadi Mohammadali Khan and Haji Khan - founded the first branch of the organization in October 1906 with the help of local merchants. The group founded on this basis was referred to as the Secret Center. Ali Musyo, an Azerbaijani radical merchant with close ties to the Hummetists in Tbilisi, acted as the leader of this group. Almost immediately after its creation, the Secret Center began to form its own armed mujahideen groups.

The publication Mücahid, the official organ of this center, began in Tabriz in September 1907. This newspaper continued to be published in Rasht in the following months and gradually, through the influence of the Secret Center, the impact of İctimaiyyun-Amiyyun spread to all northern provinces.

The Secret Center had a significant influence on the emergence of the revolutionary movement in Tabriz and assisted in forming the province branch of the Committee for Constitutional Revolution. As a result, İctimaiyyun-Amiyyun, mainly the branches referred to as Mujahid-e Tabriz (Southern), was established in Azerbaijan, Gilan, Khurasan, Isfahan, and Tehran during the years 1906-1908. The radical representatives of the committees in Rasht and Anzali supported the local villagers and the creation of village committees, but they faced opposition from the Rasht provincial committee.

İctimaiyyun-Amiyyun had a significant impact on the course of events during the Constitutional Revolution. Fearing the growing influence of the Mohammad Ali Mirza Tabriz Committee, he attempted to close it in the autumn of 1906. However, he faced opposition from the mujahideen. The Secret Center and volunteer fighters expelled two prominent clerics, Imam Jumani and Seyid Hasan Muctehidi, who were against the revolutionary actions of the Tabriz Committee, from the city. In April 1907, the mujahideen gained the authority to investigate and monitor the members of the Tabriz Committee. They also actively participated in the events in Tabriz in the spring of 1907. On 30 August 1908, Prime Minister Mirza Ali Asghar Khan Atabey-e Azam was assassinated by the mujahideen when leaving the National Assembly, and they took responsibility for this act. Abbas Agha, a member of the mujahideen who was involved in currency exchange in the market, was identified as the assassin. From the summer of 1908 to 1909, during the military resistance movement in Tabriz, two leaders emerged: Sattar Khan and Baghir Khan. They were both mujahideen and received extensive support from the South Caucasus revolutionaries, who were also actively supported by İctimaiyyun-Amiyyun.

Although the exact reasons are still not fully known, in February 1910, İctimaiyyun-Amiyyun issued a statement in the Iranian newspaper Iran-e Now, announcing the closure of all its organizations and branches throughout Iran. While the specific reasons remained unknown, it was clear that İctimaiyyun-Amiyyun was experiencing issues with the new parties emerging in Tehran.

== Bibliography ==
- Abrahamian, Ervand (1982). Iran Between Two Revolutions. Princeton University Press. pp. 76–87. ISBN 0-691-10134-5.
- Afary, Janet (9 December 2011) [15 December 1998]. "EJTEMĀʿĪŪN-E ʿĀMMĪŪN (Mojāhed), FERQA-YE". In Yarshater, Ehsan (ed.). Encyclopædia Iranica. Fasc. 3. Vol. VIII. New York City: Bibliotheca Persica Press. pp. 286–288.
