= Iranian Enlightenment =

Iranian intellectual movements from the late 19th to the early 20th centuries

The Iranian Enlightenment (Persian: روشنگری ایرانی), sometimes called the first generation of intellectual movements in Iran (Persian: نسل اول جنبش های روشنفکری در ایران), brought new ideas into traditional Iranian society from the mid-19th to the early 20th centuries. During the Qajar era, and especially after Iran's defeat in the last Russo-Persian War (1826–1828), cultural exchanges led to the formation of new ideas among the educated class of Iran. The establishment of Dar al-Fonun, the first modern university in Iran and the arrival of foreign professors, caused the thoughts of European thinkers to enter Iran, followed by the first signs of enlightenment and intellectual movements in Iran.

During this period, intellectual groups were formed in secret societies and secret associations. These secret societies included Mirza Malkam Khan's Faramosh Khaneh (based on Masonic lodges), Anjoman-e Okhovat, Society of Humanity and Mokhadarat Vatan Association. These groups spread their ideas by distributing leaflets and newspapers. These secret societies stressed the need to reform the land and administrative system and reduce the role of the clergy in society, as well as to limit the rulers within the framework of the law.

Secular Iranian thinkers based their work on confronting religious traditions. They were confronted with Shia Islam, which on the one hand was mixed with superstitions, and on the other hand, according to Ali Akbar Velayati, the strictness and intellectual prejudice of some religious people caused intellectual-scientific decline.

Among the thinkers of this period were Mirza Malkam Khan, Mirza Abdul'Rahim Talibov, Mirza Fatali Akhundov, Iraj Mirza, Mirzadeh Eshghi, Aref Qazvini, Mirza Hassan Roshdieh, Mirza Aqa Khan Kermani, Hassan Taqizadeh, Amir Kabir and Haydar Khan Amo-oghli. Most of these intellectuals expressed their thoughts through poetry and fiction, simple stories and parables that were easy for people to understand and helped to spread Enlightenment throughout Iran.

The first generation of intellectuals in Iran went beyond the borders of the country and influenced neighboring countries such as Afghanistan and the Arab world such as Egypt. People like Jamal al-Din al-Afghani collaborated with most of the great thinkers of this period from Iran.

== Background ==
After Iran's defeat in the war of 1826–1828 with Russia, the military, scientific and economic backwardness of Iran became clear to the educated class. As a result, a number of French-speaking princes, students, and literates traveled to France in 1843 to study. Among them were a number of great thinkers such as Mirza Malkam Khan and Abdul'Rahim Talibov.

One of the most important Iranian figures influencing the Iranian intellectual movement was Mirza Fatali Akhundov. A native of Tabriz but a resident of Georgia, Russia, he nevertheless wrote important books in Persian, including Mukatebat. This book can be considered an exciting statement against the Iranian traditions of the Qajar era.

=== Economy ===
The economy of the Qajar era was affected by the conflicts after the collapse of the Safavid Empire. Due to unrest in the Safavid and Qajar governments, the economy of Iran collapsed. The Qajars inherited a country whose economy had long been based on land and agriculture. The Qajars sought to stabilize the economy and expand industry and carpet weaving, trade and limited foreign trade and livestock products. The economic situation of Iran after the reign of Fath Ali Shah Qajar became a feudal economy due to the rise of Qajar princes throughout Iran.

Along with this feudal economy, the increasing influence of colonial and imperialist companies such as the East India Company in Iran, caused a complete economic collapse during the reign of Naser al-Din Shah Qajar. While a governor could earn one hundred tomans annually through embezzlement, a simple worker was paid one toman a month plus a loaf of bread. Some large feudal lords and large wealthy people, using their position and political influence, acquired large agricultural estates. Prince Mass'oud Mirza Zell-e Soltan took over all of Isfahan and its environs by poisoning and assassinating its capitalists and seizing their property.

All these dire economic conditions had degraded people's view of science and enlightenment, so the Qajar era, especially since the time of Naser al-Din Shah, was a major setback for science in Iran.

=== Influence of the French Enlightenment ===
Since there was no basis for creating an intellectual society in Qajar Iran, early thinkers followed the example of their French counterparts. During this period, Iranian intellectuals looked to France. France was a base for Iranians to study and reside in because it had no direct involvement in the developments in Iran and was a serious rival to British colonialism. From that time until the era of Mohammad Reza Shah Pahlavi, familiarity with French was one of the requirements of the Iranian educated class, and in fact, French took the traditional place of Arabic as the specialized language of students. Almost all works of Western literature, philosophy and history were translated into Persian through French.

Because of this, many intellectual customs in Qajar Iran were inspired by the French, including the tradition of setting up salons. Secret societies were mostly formed in the homes of wealthy princes interested in science. Gradually, many people were attracted to these secret societies and had different political ideologies. In 1859, the works of Voltaire, one of the most famous French philosophers of the Enlightenment, were first translated into Persian by Jalal al-Din Mirza Qajar, a freethinking prince.

Jalal al-Din Mirza, himself a student who had traveled to France to study on behalf of Amir Kabir in 1843, there became acquainted with Western philosophy and after much effort translated Voltaire's works into Persian. He presented a manuscript to Naser al-Din Shah. After a while, Voltaire's books became available to the educated class of society. One of the significant factors in the growth of the Iranian Intellectual movement was the translation of the works of Western philosophers and, above all, Voltaire.

=== Centers ===
Kerman, Gorgan, Tabriz and Yazd were the important centers of this period. For various reasons, these cities were not affected by the socio-economic losses suffered by the rest of Iran. Kerman, due to the support of the last survivor of the Zand dynasty (Lotf Ali Khan), was angered by Agha Mohammad Khan Qajar. His successors tried to rebuild the city and appease the people by sending rulers such as Mohammad Esmail Khan Nouri, Vakil al-Mulk, and Ebrahim Khan, and to forget the past by erecting works such as the Ebrahim Khan collection. For this reason, Kerman became a city of science and many great thinkers of this period such as Mirza Aqa Khan Kermani came from this city.

Gorgan was under the control of Sardar Rafie Yanehsari and his family during this period. Sardar Rafi decided to modernize Gorgan because he came from an artistic and scientific family and traveled to big cities such as St. Petersburg. In order to realize this dream, Sardar Rafi invited European orientalists to explore Gorgan and its surroundings. The first excavations were carried out around 1900 under an artificial hill near the city of Gorgan, where the Astarabad treasury was discovered. Experts believe that some of the objects in the treasury, which are very similar to the discoveries of Tepe Hissar, belong to the third millennium BC and nearly 5,000 years ago. Since then, Gorgan became one of the favorite centers of orientalists, and as a result, caused the arrival of modern science in Gorgan. Sardar Rafie was very interested in the ancient history of Iran and wished to re-introduce the ancient values of Iran.

Yazd was and still is the Zoroastrian center of Iran. The city had a mint and a library. With the investment of the great capitalists of Iran at that time, Keikhosrow Shahrokh and Jamshid Bahman Jamshidian and Parsi investors including Jamsetji Tata, this city made a lot of progress in a short period and even surpassed Tehran.

Tabriz became one of the most important centers of this period due to its trade routes to Russia and the Ottoman Empire. Tabriz was the second most populous city in the country, with a population of 240,000 at the beginning of the twentieth century, according to Bartold. On the eve of the Constitutional Revolution, 15% of the country's exports and 25% of the country's imports passed through Tabriz. The merchants of Tabriz had become acquainted with modernity through their travels to Russia and the Ottoman Empire, and some of them were considered intellectuals. Hence, they called for an advisory and law-based political structure. In Tabriz, a class of constitutionalist and anti-monarchist intellectuals was formed, led by several teachers, clerics, and merchants. Tabriz had two telegraph lines to Tehran; one was state-owned and the other belonged to the Indo-European Telegraph Company. Therefore, residents of Tabriz were always informed of the developments in the capital very quickly. On the eve of the Constitutional Revolution, a large number of Iranians, especially Azerbaijanis, had migrated to the Caucasus to work. Many of them were influenced by the Russian Revolution of 1905 and turned to radical ideas. Thus, social democratic tendencies were widespread in the region and formed constitutionalist nuclei such as the Social Democratic Party and the Azerbaijan Provincial Association.

== Amir Kabir reforms ==
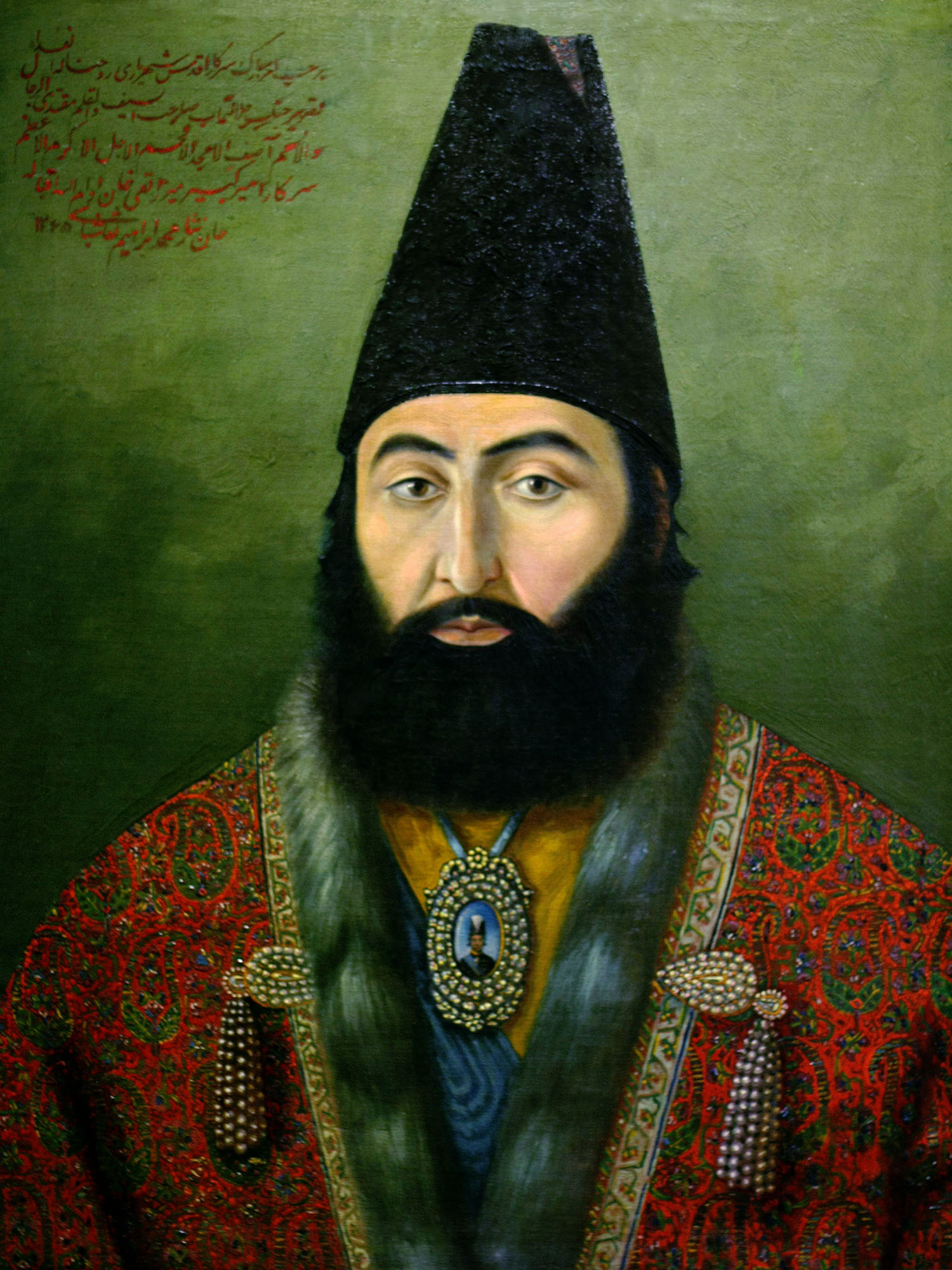
Amir Kabir known as "Iran's first reformer"

Amir Kabir became Naser al-Din Shah's first prime minister in 1848. He launched a plan for reform in Iran, including the establishment of Dar al-Fonun, the establishment of the newspaper Vaqaye-e Ettefaqiyeh, religious reform, the fight against torture, and social reform. The construction of Dar ol-Fonun was completed two days after the removal of Amir Kabir, who ordered the recruitment of professors from Europe. The arrival of foreign professors such as Jakob Eduard Polack, Alfred Jean Baptiste Lemaire and Johann Louis Schliemer in Iran and the beginning of their work at Dar ul-Fonun University brought Western science and culture to Iran. Mirza Malkam Khan, who was Iran's ambassador to Britain at the time, also returned to Iran to teach at Dar ol-Fonun.

Amir Kabir made a significant contribution to the development of the Persian language as a modern medium. Vaqayeʿ-ye Ettefaqiyeh newspaper became the first modern Iranian newspaper with the publication of world news articles, an events page, a children and adolescents page, and translation of foreign articles. After Amir Kabir's removal, the management fell into the hands of others, but until the newspaper was banned, there was no censorship in articles and news.

Amir Kabir had many problems with the ulama during his time as prime minister. They criticized Amir Kabir for opening the Dar al-Fonun, arguing that teaching in the same traditional way as "Maktab Khaneh" was the best way. Although Amir Kabir was the son of a cook and studied secretly, he hated the superstitions and abuses of the ulema. When Amir Kabir limited the power of the clergy, Mirza Abdul-qasem Tehrani opposed him and sought sanctuary in the Shah Abdol-Azim Shrine. In response, Amir Kabir assaulted the shrine and placed Abdul-qasem Tehrani under house arrest.

Amir Kabir fought against bribery during his ministry. He ordered that the incalculable receipts and unreasonable benefits courtiers and princes received from government agencies be cut off. He reduced the shah's salary to two thousand tomans a month and ended the corruption of the previous prime minister, Haji Mirza Aqasi. He reorganized the tax laws and adjusted the income statement. Amir Kabir also confiscated the rights of those who did not pay taxes.

Amir Kabir's presence in Naser al-Din Shah's court was always opposed by a number of the Shah's relatives, including Malek Jahan Khanom, the Shah's mother and Mirza Aqa Khan Nuri; the efforts of these people eventually led to the dismissal of Amir Kabir from his position. Some courtiers, who saw him as against their own interests, slandered Amir Kabir's claim to kingship.

Amir Kabir was assassinated on Saturday 10 January 1852 in the Fin Bathhouse at Kashan.

== Pre-constitutional intellectuals ==
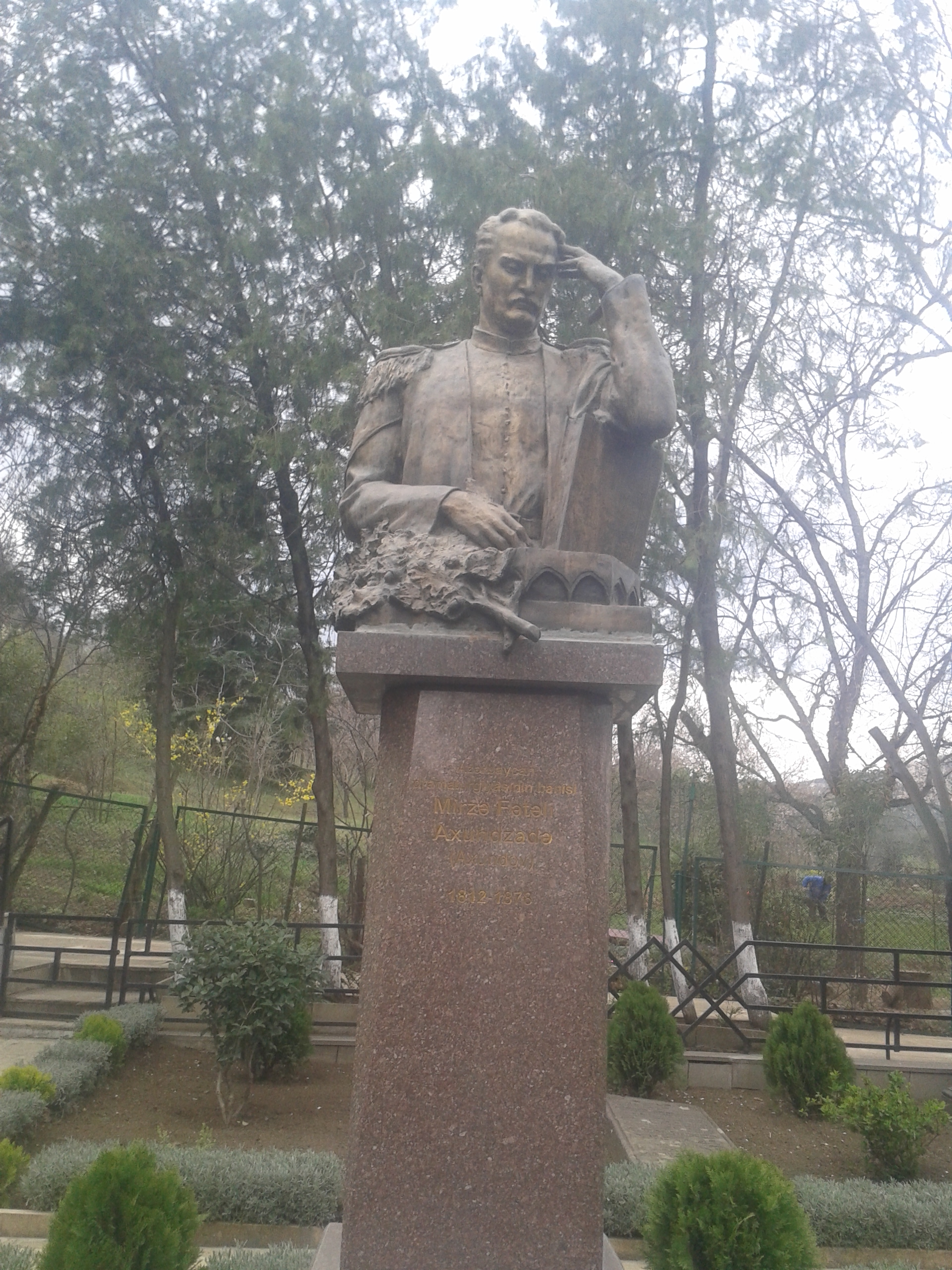
Grave of Mirza Fatali Akhundov in Tbilisi

The intellectual background of many thinkers of this period is the work of three philosophers and writers named Mirza Fatali Akhundov, Mirza Abdul'Rahim Talibov Tabrizi and Yousuf Khan Mostashar al-Dowleh. These three thinkers were very influential among their contemporaries with works on nationalism, secularism and constitutionalism.

Akhundov is best known as the first theorist of Iranian nationalism. He considers the condition of being Iranian not to be a part of Iranian-Islamic culture, but to be a part of the Iranian nation and loyal to the homeland. One of Akhundov's greatest works is his treatise Mukatebat, in which he explained his controversial theory of libertarianism. For Akhundov, libertarianism meant that every human being who enters the world should enjoy complete freedom. He considered complete freedom to consist of two types of freedom: spiritual freedom and physical freedom. He believed that religion had taken away spiritual freedom from the people. Regarding physical freedom, he believed that authoritarian governments take it from the people for their own benefits. He considered the sum of these two spiritual and physical freedoms as complete freedom and said that these cases are explained in general in Western books. He believed that the people of Asia had been deprived of complete freedom, were completely deprived of the enjoyment of equality and the blessings of human rights, and were unable to understand this deprivation.

Mirza Abdul'Rahim Talibov Tabrizi was one of the intellectuals before the Constitutional Revolution in Iran, who, following Akhundov, at the age of 55, began writing works on social, nationalist and religious criticism. During his long life, Talibov went through a period of using Western civilization, especially France, as a model for the political, social and economic life of the Iranian people. Hence, one of the most important themes of his works was modeling on Western civilization and at the same time opposing the influence of colonialism. Talibov was best known for his famous book, The Book of Ahmed, in which he was inspired by Jean-Jacques Rousseau's Emile. In this book, Talibov pursued two goals: first, to introduce society to new knowledge and sciences; and second, to institutionalize a critical view in society and especially in children. Contrary to the old tradition of education, which did not allow criticism and controversy, Talibov in his book tried to encourage questioning and teach conversation with the child as the only normal way to treat the child. Talibov was very interested in nationalism and, for the first time among Iranians, found freedom in nationalism and saw the concept of nationalism not on the basis of racism, but on the basis of "knowing one's own history and past." Talbov also considered all the people who lived in Iran to be the inheritors of the culture of ancient Iran.

Yousuf Khan Mostashar al-Dowleh, is one of the pioneers and libertarians of Naser al-Din Shah's era and the author of the famous book A Word. A Word is known as the first written document of the beginning of modernity in Iran. It was written in 1868, nearly 36 years before the Constitutional Revolution, in Paris. Mostashar al-Dowleh, himself a member of the Grand Orian Masonic Lodge, selected articles from the French constitution and the French Declaration of Human Rights and Citizenship, and tried to show Iranian clerics and elders that these laws did not contradict the Qur'an. The book accepted a law by which, according to Mostashar al-Dowleh, the shah and a beggar were equal. A Word is very secular in this respect.

The thoughts of Mostashar al-Dowleh were incompatible with the temperament of Naser al-Din Shah, so he was afflicted with the same fate that befell all libertarians at that time. He was chained and imprisoned in the Rokniyeh mansion in 1891 by the Shah. He was alone in prison and was not allowed to meet anyone, not even other prisoners in Qazvin. He was tortured in prison and died a few years later in 1895.

== Developments in the Iranian educational system ==
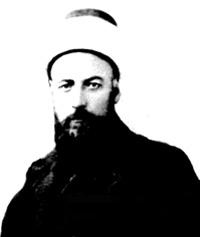
Haji-Mirza Hassan Roshdieh, teacher and journalist, known as the "father of modern Iranian education"

The construction of schools in a new style and the spread of new educational ideas in Iran was one of the most important cultural developments that, despite the opposition of some individuals and groups, was finally accepted in the Iranian cultural system.

One of the first founders of new schools in Iran was Haji-Mirza Hassan Roshdieh, known as "the father of modern Iranian education". After acquiring new educational techniques, in addition to establishing schools in a new style, Roshdieh introduced new ideas into the Iranian education system and changed the way of reading the alphabet and writing various books for children. He had the support of people like Farrokh Khan Amin al-Dawla and Sheikh Hadi Najmabadi. Thanks to their support and efforts, Roshdieh was able to contribute to the development of the education system and its generalization, and to advance the education process towards change.

Roshdieh built eight schools in Tabriz, seven of which were destroyed by clerics. But the eighth school, which was built with the support of Farrokh Khan Amin al-Dawla, remained. The development that Rushdieh made in the Iranian education system was that, before him, schools belonged to the aristocracy and government officials, and ordinary people were not allowed to study in schools, instead they had to study in maktabs. Roshdieh built schools for the general public.

== Post-constitutional developments in Iran ==
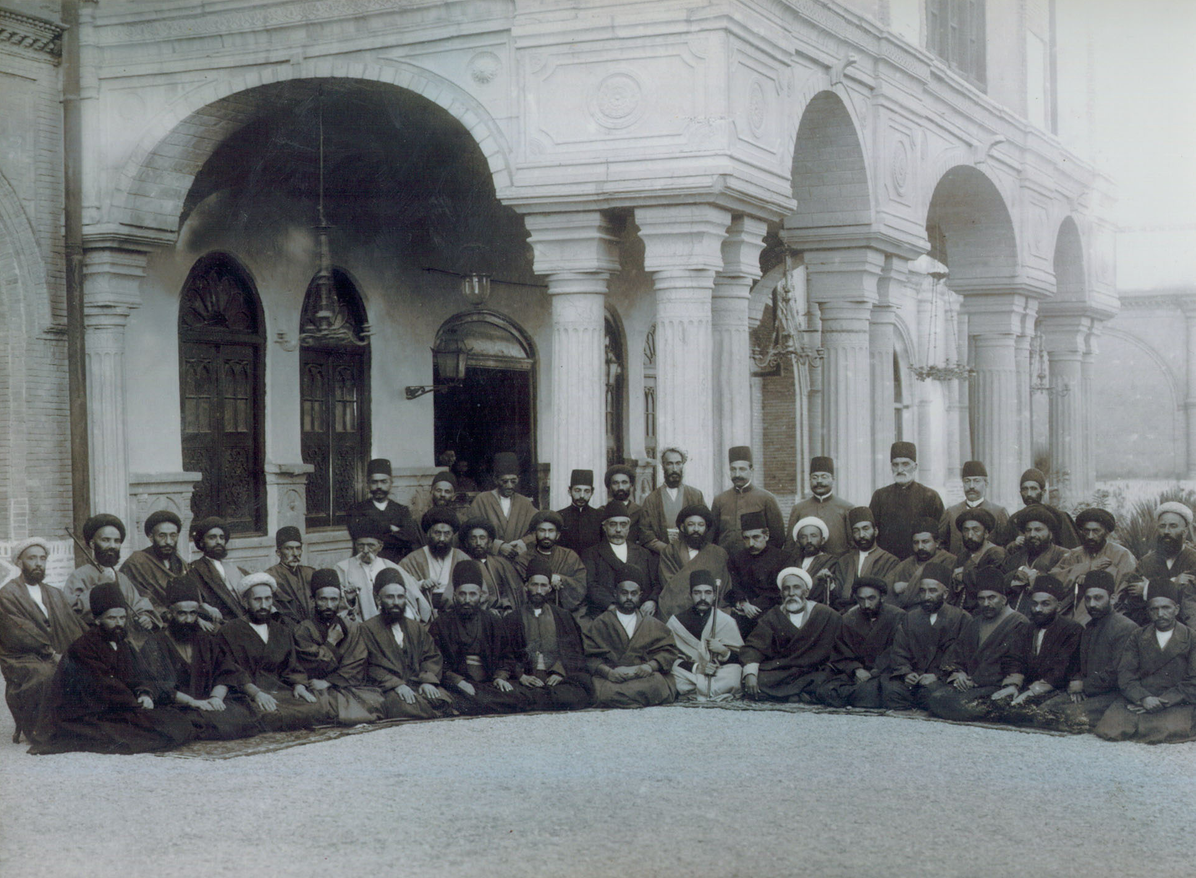
Representatives of the First Majlis

The constitutional movement was formed during the reign of Mozaffar ad-Din Shah and included various strata of the people, businessmen, clerics, peasants and politicians. With the signing of the 1906 constitution by Mozaffar ad-Din Shah, relative freedom of expression was established in Iran. Parliamentary elections were held and the first Majlis began to function. Newspapers and books were published with less censorship, and thinkers no longer saw their lives in danger. With the establishment of the first legislature and the adoption of the constitution, a new round of strife broke out between the proponents of the ancient tradition and the broad front of modernists. In fact, with the victory of the constitutionalist movement, the traditional system was disrupted and the presence of modern concepts was transferred from the realm of thought to the social and political realities of Iran.

The formation of the Majlis was a great change not only in Iran, but also in West Asia. This was the first time that power was divided among different people from different classes in the region. According to Iranian historian Mohammad Amini, the 1906 constitution was recognized in its time as a secular constitution.

=== Formation of the Social Democratic Party and modernist ideas ===
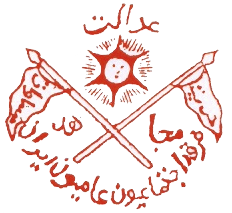
Emblem of Social Democratic Party

The formation of parliament led to the emergence and growth of intellectual ideas that may not have been possible during the reign of Naser al-Din Shah, such as secularism, modernism, and nationalism. These ideas were advanced in the first term of the parliament by one of the emerging politicians named Seyyed Hassan Taghizadeh. Taghizadeh and his supporters were known for their extremism, intellectualism, and Westernism. Taghizadeh's minority faction formed the Social Democratic Party.

The Social Democratic Party was the first political party, in the modern sense, to emerge in Iran and operate in the early years of parliament. The party had few members, and perhaps had branches in only a few cities. On the other hand, the Social Democrats helped organize a social and anti-authoritarian struggle in Tehran, and were blamed for several terrorist acts. In Gilan and Azerbaijan, they aroused the movement of peasants and craftsmen and organized the Tabriz resistance during the reign of Mohammad Ali Shah. In addition, the Social Democrats were the first party to present a clear political, social, and economic agenda and to describe their organizational form in detail in a code of conduct. The Social Democrats, unlike their conservative rivals in the Moderate Socialists Party, called for sweeping reforms in Iran in the style of Western governments. They showed their extremism with several assassinations and political sabotages, including the assassination of Shoja Nizam Marandi and his son Shoja Lashkar and the assassination of Amin al-Soltan.

Taghizadeh has been compared to George Danton in terms of his passionate speeches and political ideas. Taghizadeh was one of the few intellectuals and politicians active in the Iranian Constitutional Revolution who, in addition to political struggle, was involved in discussions in the field of new political thought and the need to establish a modern Western-style system of government in Iran. Taghizadeh is a controversial figure in the field of opinion and practice during the Qajar era. He praised the scientific achievements of the West in their various dimensions, and he considered unquestioning surrender to Western civilization as the solution to end Iran's backwardness.

=== Increasing the role of women in society ===
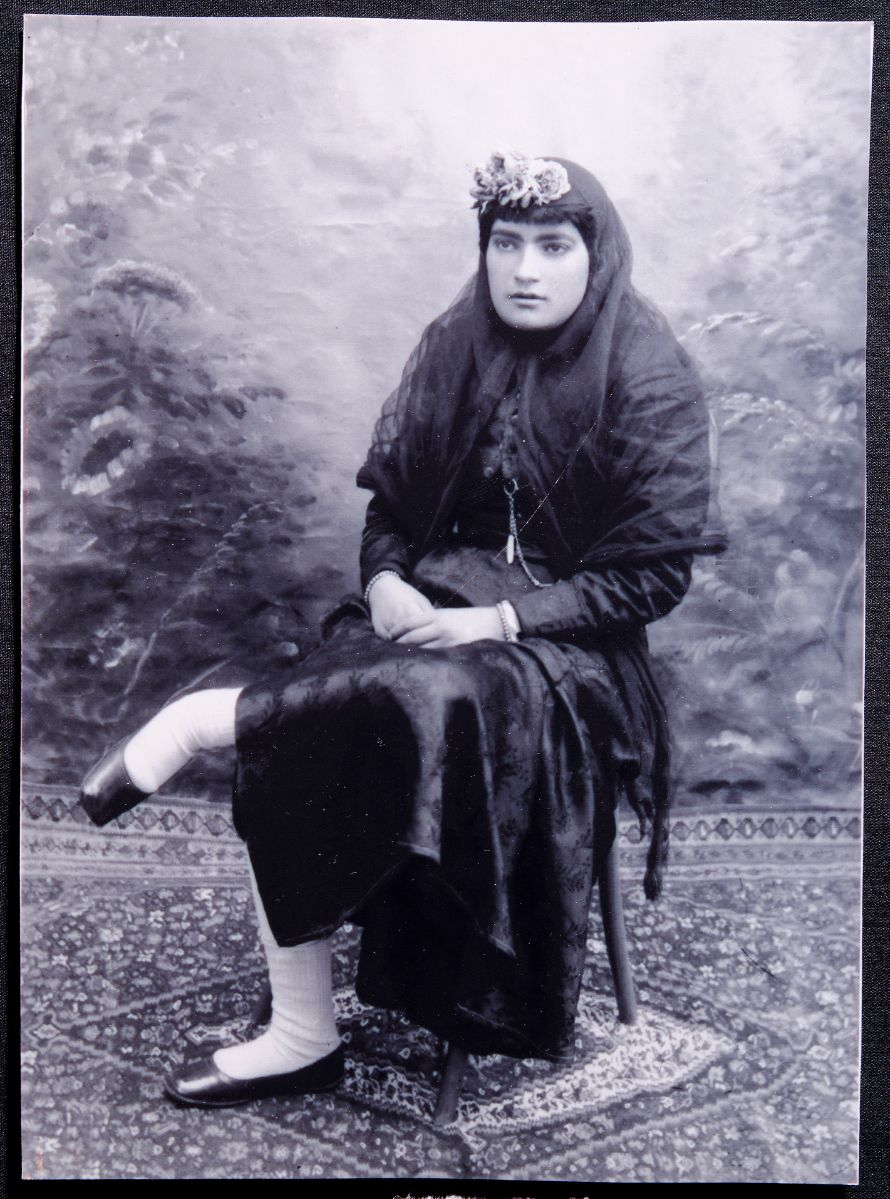
Maryam Amid, known as the first female Iranian journalist

Women were deprived of many of their basic rights for many years, but during the constitutional movement, secret and non-secret women's associations were formed. The goals of these associations were more freedom for women in society and civil equality. At this time, intellectual constitutionalist men such as Mirzadeh Eshghi, Mohammad-Taqi Bahar, Iraj Mirza, and others also supported the women's rights movement, especially the right to education and the abolition of the hijab.

At a time when reading and writing were forbidden for women and women's knowledge and research was considered a sin, Maryam Amid succeeded in launching one of first Iranian women's magazines in 1910, called Shokufeh. The aim of the publication was to acquaint women with literary works, superstition, housekeeping and childcare tips, and to try to improve women's morale. Over time, the magazine's tone became sharper and its protests against the social situation more explicit, such as criticizing the tradition of underage girls marrying and even protesting the interventions of superpowers and encouraging national independence. One of the most important actions of Amid, as the editor-in-chief of Shokufeh, was the introduction of female candidates in the third parliamentary election.

Other activities of Maryam Amid include the establishment of a girls' school, the establishment of the Hemmat Association, the elimination of superstitions and the boycott of foreign goods, and the prohibition of the import of such products.

=== Poets and socio-political developments ===
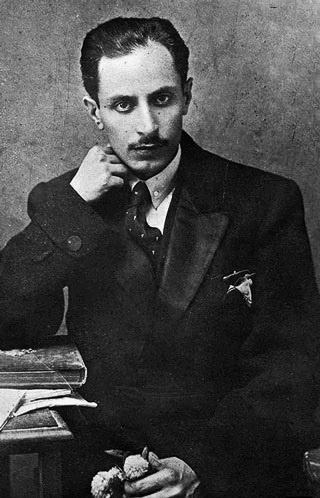
Mirzadeh Eshghi, one of the most influential poets of the constitutional movement

An important influence of the constitutional movement was the existence of libertarians and thinkers who were from the poor or middle class of society. Poets such as Aref Qazvini, Mirzadeh Eshghi and Farrokhi Yazdi are in this category. They strongly criticized the oppression of the people. Among the rich and aristocrats, there were intellectuals like Iraj Mirza who, despite being rich, wrote in a newspaper.

These libertarians were greatly angered by the aristocratic rich who came to power through corruption and bribery. Based on a story that may not be true, Farrokhi Yazdi composed a poem criticizing Zeygham al-Dawla Qashqa'i, the ruler of Yazd, and in response Zeigham al-Dawla ordered to sew his mouth with thread and needle and throw him in prison.

Aref Qazvini spent his whole life in poverty, but he did not stop composing poetry until he died of an illness. "Imprisoned Bird's Moaning", one of his most famous works, has a liberal aspect and encourages people to resist until victory.

Mirzadeh Eshghi was a very powerful poet, writer, journalist and playwright, who always supported liberal Ideas. He wrote one of the first Iranian operas, The Resurrection of the Shahriars of Iran. Mirzadeh Eshghi was also one of the first and most prominent intellectuals of the constitutional period to defend women's rights and defend women's freedom and presence in society. He criticized the low rights of women and believed that the hijab was a useless legacy of the past.

Iraj Mirza was educated and had political beliefs opposed to the general public and politicians, so he did not engage in political activity, occasionally writing poetry and pursuing careers in government and journalism. But during the constitutional movement, he began composing poems in support of the people. As a prince, Iraj Mirza criticized Muhammad Ali Shah and Ahmad Shah. He was politically conservative to the extent that he did not harm his own self-interest; at the same time though, he had patriotic and nationalist ideas.

== Mirza Malkam Khan and Freemasonry ==
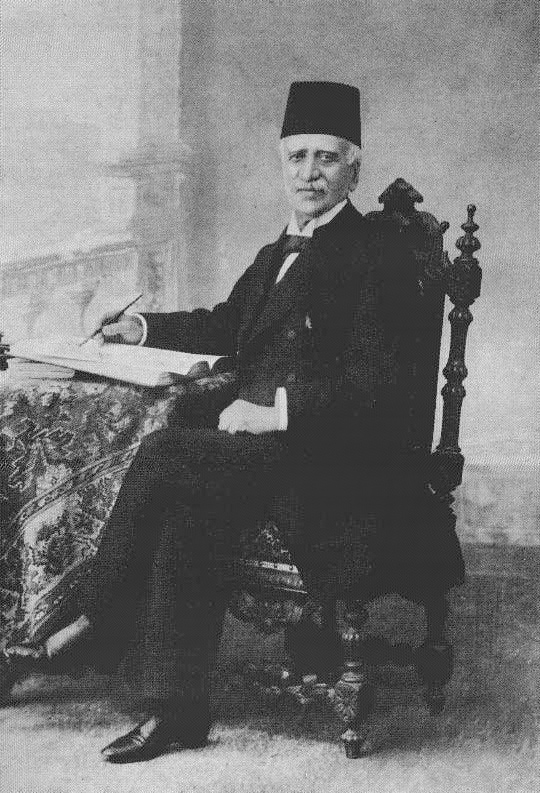
Mirza Malkam Khan, known as "the father of the Iranian Enlightenment"

Mirza Malkam Khan is known among contemporary Iranian writers, scholars, and intellectuals as the "father of the Iranian Enlightenment". Mirza Malkam Khan is one of the most prominent figures of the first generation of Iranian intellectuals, whose political thought eventually led to the victory of the constitutionalists and the establishment of parliament. There are writings left by Mirza Fatli Akhundov in which he says:

In 1863, he (Akhundov) heard and wrote from Mirza Malkam Khan that "Near the beginning of our century, Voltaire, Rousseau, Montesquieu, Mirabeau, and others, realized that in order to eliminate oppression from the world, the oppressor should not be dealt with at all, but the oppressed should be told that Donkey! You who are more oppressive in strength, number, wealth, Why do you tolerate oppression? When the oppressed became aware of such rational thoughts, they removed the oppressor, made the laws for their own comfort, and then made every person in charge of the implementation of the same laws, then there will be no opportunity for oppression to the subordinates at all."

— Mirza Fatali Akhundov, (1865)

Mirza Malkam Khan was influenced by Rousseau's ideas, which placed a strong emphasis on the awakening of human beings and believed that without freedom and spontaneity, no society would have real value. However, Mirza Malkam Khan soon came to believe that the implementation of Rousseau's ideas in Iran would be impossible. For this reason, he turned to the more practical and applied ideas of modernity, which could be turned into political projects that would lead to social mobilization.

State bureaucracy, organizing tax affairs, establishing democratic institutions, legalism, moving towards science and technology, establishing a free press, and reforming the army were among the issues that Mirza Malkam Khan sought to pursue and turn into political programs. Mirza Malkam Khan's ideas of modernity were based on reducing the power of the absolute monarchy, which had been the most powerful ruling class in Iran for centuries. This goal seemed impracticable without recruiting other powerful classes in Iran and involving them in political participation. For this reason, Mirza Malkam Khan, in the second issue of the Qanun newspaper, formally conceived the idea of forming an alliance between the clergy and the educated to break the domination of the monarchy.

Mirza Malkam Khan was interested in spreading modernity and its values in Iran. Mirza Malkam Khan's way of thinking in the political struggle, which paid much attention to social mobilization, was very similar to the ideas of Claude Adrien Helvétius. Helvétius advised reformers not to argue with the common people, because during the years of absolute rule, the thinking of the people had not grown to the extent that they understood the reformists. Rather, reformers should work to advance the interests of the people.

Although Malkam Khan in the last decades of his life focused most of his efforts on political activism and building modern institutions in the socio-political structure of Iran, his emphasis on the need for awakening and Iranian activity continued unabated until the end of his life. While Malkam Khan had an immense influence on Iran's entry into political modernity, his legacy in the 20th century was controversial.

=== Faramosh Khaneh ===
Before Mirza Malkam Khan, Freemasonry existed in Iran, and Iranians such as Mirza Askar Khan Orumi Afshar and Mirza Abolhassan Khan Ilchi were admitted to the Masonic lodges of England and Scotland. However, in 1859 Mirza Malkam Khan established the first Masonic lodge in Iran, called Faramosh Khaneh. Its members were from different classes; for example, both the urban middle-class graduates of the Dar ul-Fonun and people like Prince Jalaluddin Mirza Qajar. The ideology of this association was rooted in Malkam Khan's interpretation of the socio-political ideals of nineteenth-century Europe, especially the French Revolution: ideals such as liberalism and humanism. Despite Malkam Khan's preparations, the wave of opposition rose very quickly. Although the internal organization of Faramosh Khaneh was derived from Freemasonry lodges in Europe, Malkam Khan's Faramosh Khaneh was not connected organizationally with European Freemasonry circles.

In the beginning, many intellectuals of the Qajar period recognized the Freemasonry organization as a modern, revolutionary and Libertarian organization that had no purpose other than to fight against tyranny and to establish democracy. One of the important factors that attracted the intellectuals of this period to Freemasonry organizations, especially its French lodge, was the important role of its members in the French Revolution. Since the French Revolution was a valuable example for Iranian revolutionaries and intellectuals, they saw the formation of Faramosh Khaneh and the joining of Freemasonry organizations as a means of transformation and revolution in Iran. The Faramosh Khaneh was first established with the permission of Naser al-Din Shah during the reign of Mirza Aga Khan, one of the defenders of Freemasonry, and it flourished during this period. Mirza Aga Khan eventually ordered its closure, and Mirza Malkam Khan was arrested and exiled to Iraq.

== Leftist thinkers ==
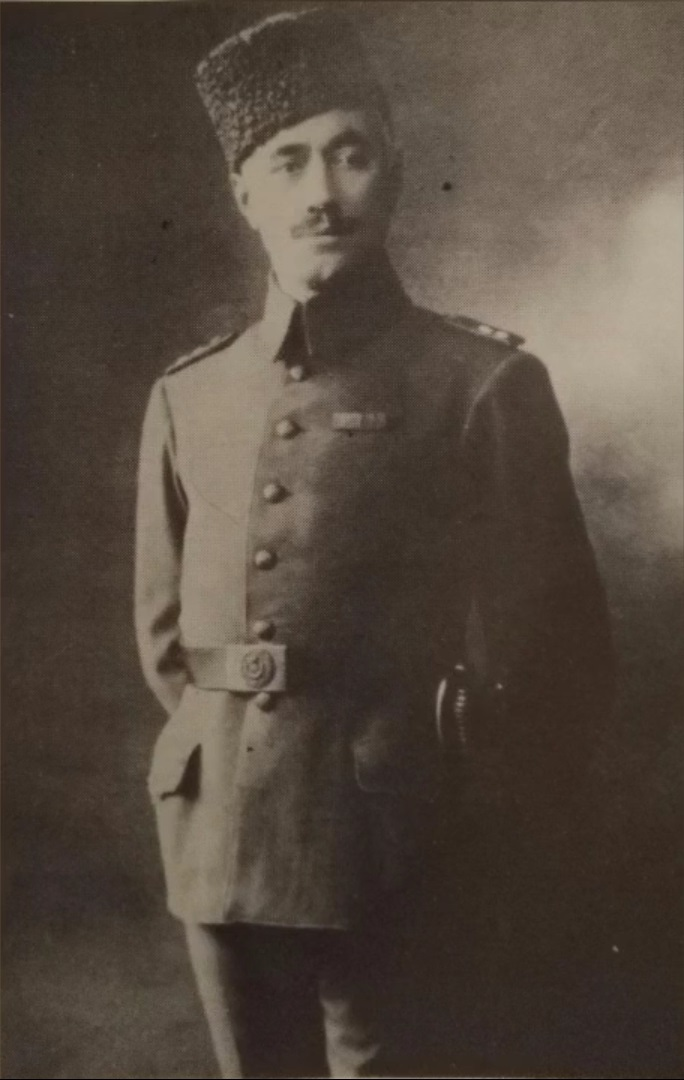
Haydar Khan Amo-oghli, one of the leaders of the Constitutional Revolution and the founder of the Social Democratic Party and Communist Party of Iran

After the victory of the Constitutional Revolution in 1906, leftist ideologies entered Iran, supported by a number of emerging constitutional leaders such as Hassan Taghizadeh and Haydar Khan Amo-oghli. It was at this time that the Social Democratic Party, a remnant of the Baku Hemmat party, was formed. However, after a while, Taghizadeh and Amo-oghli clashed over the extremism and assassinations committed by Amo-oghli, which led to the dissolution of the party.

Haydar Khan Amo-oghli, known as "the greatest leftist thinker and theorist of Qajar Iran", was one of the most influential figures of the Constitutional Revolution and later of the Jungle Movement. Amo-oghli, became acquainted with socialist ideas while studying at the Tbilisi Polytechnic University and became a member of the Russian Social Democratic Workers' Party. Amo-oghli fled to the Caucasus after the defeat of the Russian Revolution of 1905 and founded the Hemmat Party in Baku with Nariman Narimanov. After a while, Haydar Khan returned to Iran and the Hemmat Party became the Social Democratic Party. After that, Haydar Khan's terrorist activities began. In 1907, Amin al-Soltan was assassinated by Abbas Agha Tabrizi, a supporter of Haydar Khan. After the bombardment of the Majlis, Haydar Khan went to Baku, where he sent volunteers to fight Mohammad Ali Shah and help the resistance fighters of Tabriz, and he himself came to Tabriz. During the battles of Tabriz, he was involved in killing Shojae Nezam Marandi with a bomb.

After the Triumph of Tehran, Haydar Khan continued his secret revolutionary activity. In 1910 he went on a secret mission among the Bakhtiari tribe and returned to Tehran in March 1911 where he lived secretly until his whereabouts were identified. He was exiled by order of Yeprem Khan. Heydar Khan went to Russia and from there to France and Switzerland and joined Lenin's colleagues. Haydar Khan participated in the Baku Congress in 1917 after the formation of Bolshevik Russia and formed the first communist party in Iran called the Justice Party with Avetis Sultan-Zade. From the very beginning, there were two policies in the party: the faction that gathered around Sultan-zadeh considered Iran on the eve of the socialist revolution. The more moderate faction, which favored the views of Haydar Khan, believed that Iran was still not ready for a socialist revolution and worked towards a national and democratic revolution. During the Iranian Communists' joining the Jungle Movement, Haydar Khan's policy prevailed and he became the leader of the Communist Party of Iran.

Following Haydar Khan's death in 1921, his allies accused Mirza Kuchik Khan of assassinating him. Haydar Khan was initially an extremist socialist who believed in a sweeping reform in Iran. However, after returning from Russia, he turned to moderate communism and worked hard to establish this ideology in Iran. Many leftist thinkers in Iran are still influenced by him because the basis of the ideology of communism in Iran is the same moderation that Haydar Khan agreed with.

== Bábist intellectuals ==
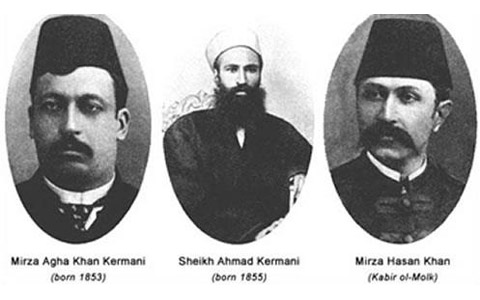
Three great Bábist thinkers during Qajar Iran (from left to right): Mirza Aqa Khan Kermani, Sheikh Ahmad Rouhi, Mirza Hassan Khan

One of the new religions in Iran was Bábism. The Bábist movement began following the 1850 execution of Sayyid Ali Muhammad Shirazi, known as the Báb. Several thinkers among the Bábists were very influential during this period.

Mirza Aqa Khan Kermani was one of the founders of Iranian nationalism. He fled to Istanbul with his colleague Sheikh Ahmad Rouhi and another Bábist writer named Mirza Hassan Khan Tabrizi, and there with Jamal al-Din al-Afghani began to work to promote liberal and nationalist ideas. Jamal al-Din al-Afghani was a major figure of the Arab Nahda (Awakening) movement. However, over time the observation of al-Afghani's lack of work and lack of struggle caused Mirza to despair, as he wrote in one of his letters:

"Sheikh" Seyyed Jamal is sitting in his house and several workers are taken from morning to evening to receive people from different countries such as Indians, Arabs, Afghans, Egyptians, Iranians, Turks and Sudanese are busy and have nothing else to do."

Kermani later broke with al-Afghani and, with his new pan-nationalist ideas, wrote several books in which he expressed a wish to restore the empires which had existed before the Arab invasion of Iran. Kermani became an atheist at the end of his life, which was one of the reasons for his eventual execution.

Before fleeing to Istanbul, Sheikh Ahmad Rouhi wrote the book Hasht Behesht (Eight Heavens) in Iraq, in which he described the beliefs of Bábism and considered the Constitutional Revolution as a precondition for the downfall of the Qajar dynasty. In this book, he also described his vision of an ideal government. The book was saved from extinction by Edward Granville Browne.

Mirza Hassan Khan Tabrizi was a writer and former politician who was Iran's consul in the Levant before joining Sheikh Ahmad Rouhi and Mirza Agha Khan Kermani. In Istanbul, due to the availability of printing presses, he became the editor of Iranian activist publications from Iran and Britain, and he also corresponded with Bábists and endangered politicians and brought many of them to Istanbul.

After the assassination of Naser al-Din Shah, the Ottomans extradited Sheikh Ahmad Rouhi, Mirza Hassan Khan, and Mirza Aga Khan, who had been imprisoned in Trabzon, to Iran. On 17 July 1896, Crown Prince Mohammad Ali Mirza beheaded them in the northern garden of Tabriz on charges of being Bábist and sent their heads full of straw to Tehran.

Mirza Jahangir Khan was a journalist and writer who hid his religion during the constitutional movement. He was one of the founders of the Anjoman-e Bagh-e Meykadeh, one of the most influential secret societies during the constitutional movement. After the signing of the 1906 constitution of Iran by Muzaffar al-Din Shah Qajar, there was a relative freedom of expression, so Jahangir Khan founded the newspaper Sur-e Esrafil and explicitly criticized the policies of Mohammad Ali Shah.

Ali-Akbar Dehkhoda, who worked on Sur-e Esrafil with Jahangir Khan, writes about him:

Mirza Jahangir Khan excelled in writing and journalism, fluent but sharp prose. Without any fear, he wrote about the deepest corruption within government institutions. He was always sympathetic to the ignorance of the people.

On the day Colonel Liakhov bombardment the parliament on the orders of Mohammad Ali Shah, Jahangir Khan, along with Malek al-Motakallemin and Qazi Ardaghi, was writing a report for Sur-e Esrafil. The three were arrested and executed on 23 June 1908, in front of the Bāgh-e Shāh, after being tortured.

== Decline ==
The intellectuals of the Iranian Enlightenment had weaknesses that prevented them from ever achieving their goals. They did not have a proper understanding of the general public. Suggestions such as simplifying their concepts also failed to reach the public. In addition to these, there were many disagreements between intellectual leaders. Other than Mirza Malkam Khan, who had a very good relationship with Mirza Fatali Akhundov and several other intellectuals and wrote letters to all of them, the general intellectuals fell victim to infighting over small issues. Nor did the intellectuals succeed in defeating and dominating the spiritual and superstitious sections of society. One of the most important reasons for its formation was the struggle against superstitions and clerics who were anti-intellectual and anti-scholarly. However, in the late Qajar period, the clergy succeeded in re-establishing themselves as intellectuals. Mostly because the repression of intellectuals was carried out by politicians who were also anti-scholarly and anti-intellectual.

The first generation of intellectual movements in Iran continued to prosper until Mohammad Ali Shah bombed the parliament in 1908. Mohammad Ali Shah dealt a fatal blow to the constitutional movement and the intellectual movement by executing many of the great intellectuals of the time, such as Mirza Jahangir Khan. Due to the lack of alternatives to these individuals, Shiite clerics and anti-constitutional politicians soon took over. They also continued to censor and suppress the constitutionalists. Intellectuals such as Mirzadeh Eshghi and Aref Qazvini fled to Istanbul to save their lives. Under Ahmad Shah, the parliament was closed for fourteen years on his orders, causing political unrest. The political turmoil in the capital reached such a level that on the night of 17 July 1910, four people stormed the house of Seyyed Abdollah Behbahani and killed him. Shortly afterwards, another political assassination took place in Tehran. Ali Mohammad Khan Tarbiat, a writer and journalist from the Democratic Party, was killed. Political turmoil and the escape, assassination, murder and execution of intellectuals all made the constitutional movement and the intellectual movement look broken.

=== Transfer to second generation ===
On 21 February 1921, Reza Khan Mirpanj and Zia-ud-Din Tabatabai staged a coup against the government of Fathollah Khan Akbar. The successful coup led to the establishment of a government led by Prime Minister Zia al-Din Tabatabai and War Minister Reza Khan Sardar Sepah. Tabatabai was unpopular in the Majlis due to the arrest of many of his opponents and was finally dismissed after a hundred days, leading to Sardar Sepah's installation as the new prime minister. Reza Khan Sardar Sepah's reforms began during his tenure as prime minister, which many intellectuals, including Suleiman Eskandari, considered a "window of hope." On 31 October 1925, in a vote in the fifth parliament of the National Assembly, Reza Khan Sardar Sepah was elected shah, which is considered to be the beginning of the second generation of intellectual movements.
