= Aliqoli Mirza Qajar =

Iranian prince, minister and scholar (1822–1880)

Aliqoli Mirza Qajar علیقلی میرزا
- Etezad os-Saltaneh اعتضاد السلطنه
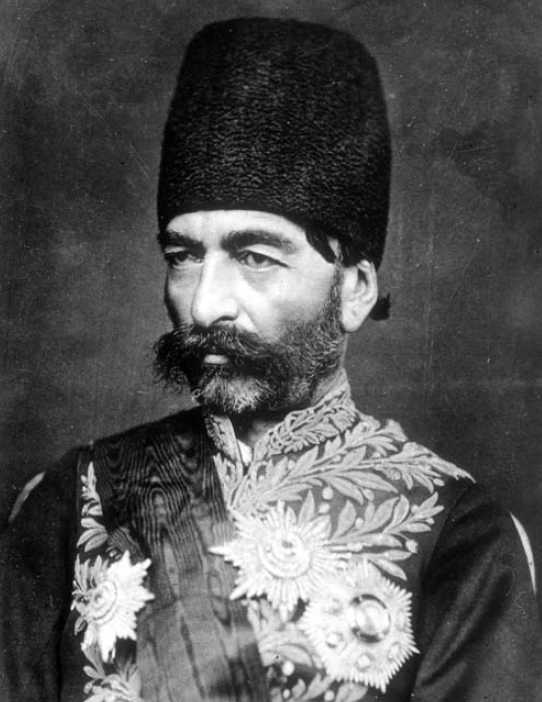
- Aliqoli Mirza, late 1870s
- Born: 7 December 1822
- Died: 14 December 1880 (aged 58)
- Dynasty: Qajar
- Father: Fath-Ali Shah Qajar
- Mother: Gol-Pirhan Khanum
- Religion: Islam

Aliqoli Mirza Qajar (Persian: علیقلی میرزا قاجار; 7 December 1822 – 14 December 1880) was an Iranian prince of the Qajar dynasty and scholar who served as the first Minister of Science in Qajar Iran. He was the forty-seventh son of Fath-Ali Shah Qajar (r. 1797–1834). Aliqoli Mirza was fascinated by the European Enlightenment and tried to spread its ideals in Iran. During the heyday of the Dar al-Fonun college, he was the headmaster of the school and played a key role in its survival.

In 1860, Shah Naser al-Din Shah established the Ministry of Science and appointed Aliqoli Mirza as its first Minister of Science. He served for 22 years and held various other positions, such as Minister of Mines and supervisor of education and crafts. He was responsible for building Iran's first telegraph line, he ran the government printing house, and he held the governorates of Malayer and Tuyserkan. He also supervised several newspapers, such as the Ruznameh-ye Mellati and Ruznameh-ye elmiya-ye dawlat aliya-ye Iran, the first Persian scholarly journal.

While Aliqoli Mirza wrote a variety of books on topics ranging from history to astronomy, his most important scientific work was a Persian-language interpretation of Newton's theories. Other notable works that he produced or participated in the composition of include: Nameh-ye Daneshvaran, a collection of biographies of Iranian and Muslim scholars; Al-Mutanabin, the history of religions; History of events and accidents in Afghanistan, the first Persian source that recorded the Anglo-Persian War; Exir al-Tavarikh; Fitna of Báb; and his own diwan . Aliqoli Mirza died in 1880 and was buried in Ray. Although his conservative proclivities slowed his initiatives, his work nevertheless proved influential during the Iranian Enlightenment.

== Early life ==
Aliqoli Mirza was born on 7 December 1822, the forty-seventh son of Fath-Ali Shah with his Armenian kanīz from Tbilisi, Gol-Pirhan Khanum. He received the traditional princely education and possibly learned the basics of modern sciences while serving as an attendant in his father's court. Aliqoli Mirza was closest to his younger brother, Jalal al-Din Mirza, who also became a scholar. His part-time tutor, Mirza Asghar Khan Afshar, had been the ambassador of Iran to France, and taught his knowledge of the Western world to the young prince, introducing him to writers of the Age of Enlightenment such as Rousseau and Voltaire. He was also taught archery, horse riding, and, of his own free will, French. In his early puberty, Aliqoli Mirza's conservative nature began to form, as he was put under the teachings of Mirza Nazar Ali Hakim bashi Qazvini, an influential Sufi who was also his brother-in-law.

The young prince also had an interest in Iranian poetry, especially Omar Khayyam. Khayyam had an influential role in Aliqoli Mirza's life, as, according to him, he never went to sleep without reading at least one of Khayyam's poems. Aliqoli Mirza witnessed the rise of Bábism and befriended many Bábists in his youth. One of them was Abdol-Rahim Heravi, who helped him gather a library.

Aliqoli Mirza wrote his first book of historiography, Exir al-Tavarikh, in 1837. He later criticised the work as "excessively influenced by Abd al-Razzak Bey's Ma'ater-e soltaniya".

== Career ==
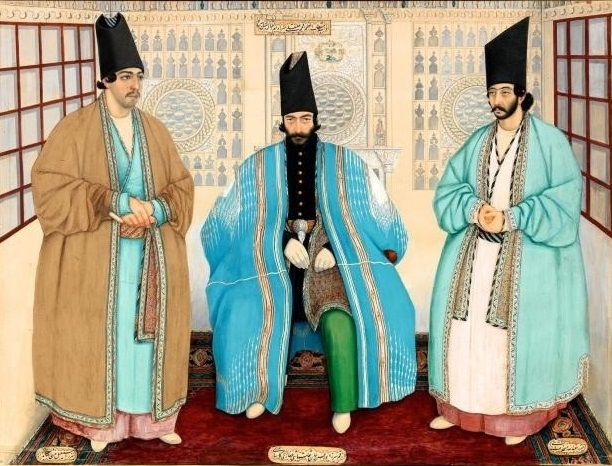
Aliqoli Mirza Etezad al-Saltanah and his servants, by Abu'l-Hasan Sani al-Mulk, circa 1840s.

=== Dispute with Amir Kabir ===
Aliqoli Mirza entered the politics of Qajar Iran in the early 1840s when his nephew, Mohammad Shah, appointed him regent and later minister to Malek Jahan Khanom. He administered her affairs, including the governorate of Khalkhal in Azerbaijan, whose income was delivered to Malek Jahan and was used in her household. In 1848, Mohammad Shah died, and a council of statesmen, called the People's Council — presided by Malek Jahan Khanom — was formed. Aliqoli Mirza was a member and also a candidate for premiership, along with Mirza Nazar Ali Khan. However, when the new Shah, Naser al-Din, arrived at Tehran with Mirza Taqi Khan Amir Kabir as his chosen prime minister, the council was abolished. Mirza Nazar Ali was sent into exile and Malek Jahan's official role was severely reduced, but Aliqoli Mirza retained his position as her minister. However, his initial presence on the council made Amir Kabir mistrust him, which persisted until the prime minister's death.

In February 1850, Amir Kabir's agents exposed an alleged Bábi plot to assassinate both the prime minister and the Imam of Friday of Tehran; Aliqoli Mirza was under strong suspicion when the royal guards found Abdol-Rahim Heravi hiding in his house. To discharge himself, he was pressured not only to surrender Abdol-Rahim, but to organise a raid by his servants on a Bábi meeting place in Tehran. However, Aliqoli Mirza mediated for Abdol-Rahim to only be imprisoned; he later took refuge in Ottoman Iraq. Later, to defend himself against the accusations, Aliqoli Mirza wrote Fitna of Báb. Although Aliqoli Mirza may have collaborated with Amir Kabir's opponents, there is no evidence to support the idea that he was among those who plotted Amir Kabir's dismissal and execution. He even stated that with Amir Kabir's death, "Persia, too, died."

=== Headmaster of Dar ul-Funun ===
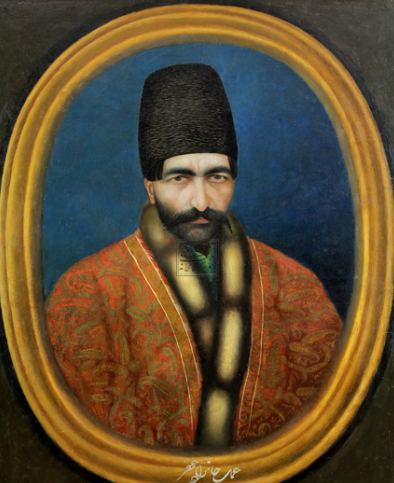
Aliqoli Mirza by Abbas Khanlou Jafar, circa 1860s

Aliqoli Mirza's first activity at Dar al-Fonun was in 1852 or 1853, when he was appointed as a chief examiner and inspector to Amir Kabir's new government college. Although he was no longer in the service of Malek Jahan, he maintained good relations with her to avoid losing his powerful ally. He even married Mah Soltan Khanum, a dancer of the Shah's court, with her blessing. He also received the governorate of Tarom, previously Malek Jahan's estate, along with Malayer and Tuyserkan. In 1857, he was bestowed the title Etezad os-Saltaneh (Persian: اعتضادالسلطنه, romanized: Eʿteżād-al-Salṭana, lit. 'Assistant to the Monarchy'), mainly because his book, History of Events and Accidents in Afghanistan, called the Battle of Khushab, which he witnessed, an honourable failure.

Aliqoli Mirza officially became the headmaster of Dar al-Fonun in 1858, and remained until the end of his life. He appointed the young Reza-Qoli Khan Hedayat as the college's principal and manager of day-to-day affairs, and built a large library, filled with his books and books brought by foreign teachers. Encouraged by Mirza Malkam Khan and the European teachers, in 1858 Aliqoli Mirza proposed to the Shah to build the first government-operated telegraph line in Persia, between Tehran and Tabriz. The telegraph line was engineered by Ahmad Karzbar, one of the teachers of Dar ul-Funun. In July 1859, when the Shah camped in Soltaniyeh, the line was to be used between the capital and the camp in Zanjan, and it soon afterwards reached Tabriz. In the same year, a failed assassination attempt and accusations made towards Malkam Khan's Freemasonry-inspired Faramosh Khaneh, prompted Naser al-Din Shah to close down the Dar ul-Funun, but Aliqoli Mirza with his influence, prevented this.

=== Government roles ===
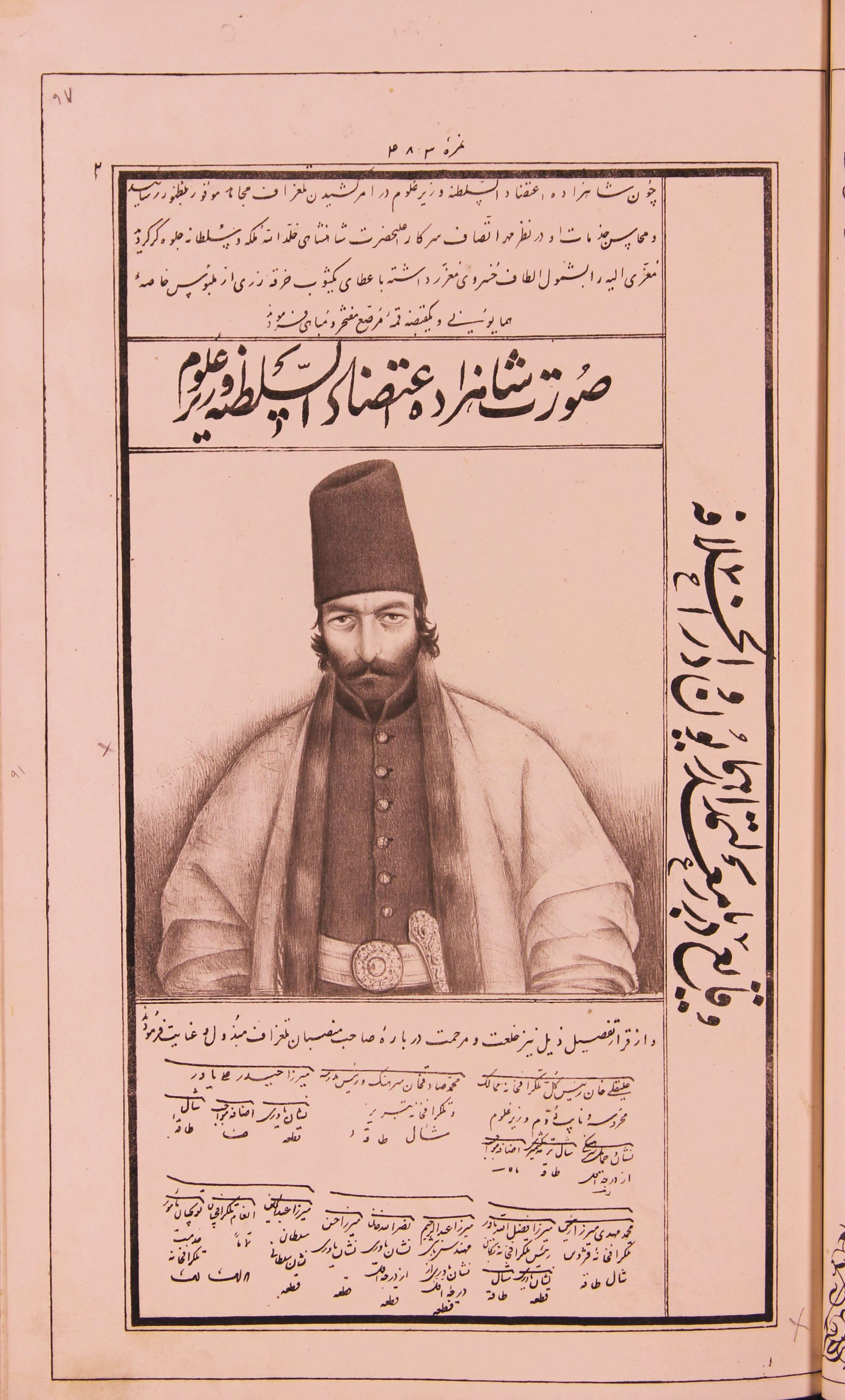
Aliqoli Mirza as the minister of sciences in the Ruznameh-ye Dowlat-e ʿAliyeh-ye Iran, in 1861, on the importance of the telegraph lines.

In 1860, Naser al-Din Shah created the Ministry of Sciences and, on the advice of his mother, appointed Aliqoli Mirza as Iran's first Minister of Sciences. His decision mainly was due to Aliqoli Mirza's mixed support for aspects of both modernity and tradition, since the Shah wanted to prevent a backlash from the clergy. Also, part of it was because Aliqoli Mirza belonged to the Government Consultative Council formed by Naser al-Din Shah in the early 1860s. As the minister, Aliqoli Mirza sent a group of forty-two students to France for further education in scientific, technical, and medical fields, and translated and published a few French articles in the Ruznameh-ye elmiya-ye dawlat aliya-ye Iran, Persia's first scholarly journal. This government-funded group, the only one organized during the reign of Naser al-Din Shah, was selected entirely on the basis of their scholarly worth rather than family status.

In 1860–1861, Aliqoli Mirza appointed Abu'l-Hasan Khan Ghaffari as the editor of Iran's official gazette, Ruznameh-ye Dowlat-e Aliyeh-ye Iran, known for its lithographic illustrations. Aliqoli Mirza also was the director of the Ruznameh-ye Mellati, previously known as Ruznameh-ye mellat-e saniya-ye Iran, a weekly newspaper founded in 1866, under the editorship of Hakim Semnani. In the beginning it was intended to reflect public opinion, but it soon turned into a literary journal, and published biographical articles on classical and contemporary Persian poets.

By the end of the decade, he became the supervisor of education and crafts; director of a European-model public hospital in Dar al-Fonun, and director of government newspapers and printing houses in Tehran and in the provinces. He built telegraph lines and modern factories, and he governed his estate, whose income he spent to expand Dar al-Fonun. In 1865–1866, Aliqoli Mirza had another telegraph line built between Bushehr and Jolfa that connected with British lines and Russian lines in the Caucasus. As the telegraph grew speedily in Iran, Naser al-Din Shah in 1876–1877 created the telegraph office, with Aliqoli Khan Mokber al-Dowleh as its minister. Responsibilities for trade, mines, and industries were also assigned to new ministries, although for a time in 1876–1877, Aliqoli Mirza regained control of the mines.

Aliqoli Mirza accompanied the Shah on his trip to Europe in 1873 and was one of the signers of the Reuter concession. He launched his most important scholarly contribution, the first modern Persian encyclopedia, Nameh-ye Daneshvaran, by royal decree in 1877.

In 1873, when the Shah organised the Council of Benevolent Reforms on the advice of the new prime minister, Mirza Hosein Khan Sepahsalar, he recruited Aliqoli Mirza as a member. Aliqoli Mirza at first had hopes of the council becoming a European-style parliament, but was disappointed to find out that he was acting as an "obsequious propaganda puppet", in his words, and resigned from his position. Afterwards, he joined the opposition of Sepahsalar, mostly because of his fear of losing his positions.

=== Downfall and death ===
By the mid-1870s, Aliqoli Mirza noted the excessive presence of Mohammad Hasan Khan E'temad os-Saltaneh at the Shah's side, as he himself was becoming a less important figure for Naser al-Din Shah, especially after Malek Jahan Khanom's death in 1873. He formed a rivalry with Etemad al-Saltanah when the latter became "the chronicler of the court" by the Shah's orders. In 1877, most of the positions held by Aliqoli Mirza in the fields of culture, journalism, and press surveillance were transferred to Etemad al-Saltanah by order of the Shah; Aliqoli Mirza intended to recover the respect of Naser al-Din Shah with Nameh-ye Daneshvaran, and managed to finish the first and most extensive volume before his death in 1879. After his death, Etemad al-Saltanah became the director of the project and published six volumes before it was abandoned in 1906–1907. Etemad al-Saltanah gained these positions with his obedience to the Shah, as he tended to censor all news of the state for Naser al-Din Shah in a sycophantic way and show others in a negative light to him; whereas Aliqoli Mirza, partly because of the support of Malek Jahan, never hid his opinions.

Aliqoli Mirza died on 14 December 1880, and was buried in Shah Abdol-Azim Shrine. He married once, and had a son and a daughter. His daughter, Shirin al-Mamalek, founded some of the most prominent literary circles and had an important role in the Triumph of Tehran. His son, Mohammad Hassan Mirza, spent all his wealth after the death of his father, and thus had to become a royal servant. During Mozaffar ad-Din Shah's reign, he was bestowed the title Motazed Al-Saltanah and died after 1904.

== Literary career ==
=== Nameh-ye Daneshvaran ===
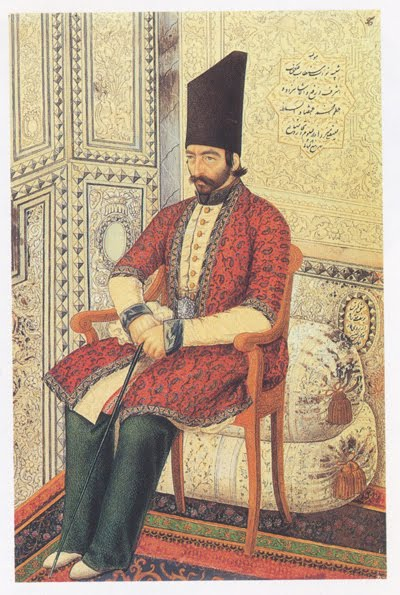
Portrait of Aliqoli Mirza (1856–57) by Abu'l-Hasan Sani al-Mulk.

Aliqoli Mirza's most notable work is Nameh-ye Daneshvaran, the first modern Persian encyclopedia: a multi-volume, alphabetically ordered work, containing biographical articles about Muslim and non-Muslim scholars, poets, physicians, mystics, and others from the rise of Islam to the Qajar era. To gather material, Aliqoli Mirza ordered the Shah's decree to be communicated to the governors of the provinces, so that each could document information about the scholars of their region. He also invited a group of prominent scholars and writers who were willing to collaborate on compiling this work, and after interviewing and examining them, he selected four qualified people and commissioned them to write this book. The selected authors were Sheikh Mohammad Mehdi Shams al-Ulama Abd al-Rabbadi, Mirza Abolfazl Savji, Mullah Abdul Wahab Qazvini, and Mirza Hassan Taleghani. Under the editorship of Sheikh Mohammad, Aliqoli Mirza saw the first volume of the book published during his lifetime. After his death, directorship of the project was handed over to Etemad al-Saltanah, who dismissed Mirza Hassan because of his Bábi beliefs. Etemad al-Saltanah managed to finish six volumes, up to the letter Shin and ending with Shah Nimatullah Wali. After that, the project was abandoned in 1906–1907, when Etemad al-Saltanah died and Mozaffar ad-Din Shah was not interested in investing further in it.

To write Nameh-ye Daneshvaran, Aliqoli Mirza, in addition to his personal library, used the large library of Aqa seyyed Ali, a merchant of Tehran, with local sources in various dialects, which the authors had to translate as accurately as possible. As explained in the preface, he set up a special framework for compiling biographies, which has some noteworthy points, including the scope of the encyclopedia — the history of all scholars of the Islamic world, in alphabetical order and written in chronological order for each person, explaining difficult terms and words. He inserted a rich selection of each person's works and translated them into Persian if necessary, mentioned anecdotes about them, wrote content in understandable prose for the general public, and avoided any prejudice.

Nameh-ye Daneshvaran is still used by scholars and writers. This work was the first group effort of the new era in Iran, which was created with specific plans, ideas and budgets under the full supervision of the government. A special unit of the Ministry of Science, the Nameh-ye Daneshvaran Compilation Assembly, wrote it.

=== Al-Mutanabin and Fitna of Báb ===
Aliqoli Mirza wrote two books on the religions of Iran and Middle East with a history of the claimants of prophecy. One also contains a look at the history of the religions outside of Islam, such as Zoroastrianism and Christianity, and also specifically analyses Bábism. Alqoli Mirza modeled it after Biruni's The Remaining Signs of Past Centuries, as he also narrates the history of religions in Iran. Al-Mutanabin begins by narrating the movement of Mazdak, which Aliqoli Mirza knew from Ibn al-Nadim's Al-Fihrist and Ferdowsi's Shahnameh, then analyses his beliefs. He was even aware of the former Buddhist societies in eastern Iran and Afghanistan. Aliqoli Mirza's notes about the Christians of Iran came from personal correspondence with the Armenian patriarchs and visiting the cathedrals in Tehran. Aliqoli Mirza also describes the history of the claimants of prophethood, and wrote the biographies of several of them. This account had a short section about Bábism, taken from Mohammad Taqi Sepehr's Tarikh-e Qajariya, and suffers from the same biases and inaccuracies as its source. The last section of the book is a debate between the prince and Karim Khan Kermani, the third leader of Shaykhism. This debate was on whether the rise of Báb was a result of Shaykhism, and thus Bábism could be the heir of Shaykhism, or whether Báb and his followers digressed from the trueness of Shaykh Ahmad's beliefs.

Fitna of Báb was written at a time when Aliqoli Mirza had been accused of being a Bábi and had received threats from the public. The early version of the book was published as an answer to the accusers, and was read in the court in front of Naser al-Din Shah. The Shah, who was pleased with Aliqoli Mirza's work, pardoned him. However, he later rewrote the book into a historical account, containing information on how Bábism was formed and introducing some of its prominent figures, such as Táhirih and Subh-i-Azal. It was also the first Persian source that recognised Baháʼu'lláh and his Baháʼí Faith.

=== Exir al-Tavarikh ===
Aliqoli Mirza's first work was the Exir al-Tavarikh, written in two volumes, which he began in 1837, when he was 15 years old. The first volume begins with Keyumars, the legendary first king of Persia, and ends with the fall of the Zand dynasty. The second volume, written in 1842, contains the history of the first Qajar kings and their backgrounds, and continues until the eighth year of the reign of Mohammad Shah. In addition, the scholars, poets, and mystics of the first Qajar era are mentioned in great detail. In his historiography, Aliqoli Mirza strongly favors some people and sharply opposes others, among these Abol-Qasem Qa'em-Maqam, who he portrayed as an "enemy to the Shah and country" and a "traitor".

Aliqoli Mirza later criticised many of his earlier opinions in the work, and described his "one-sided" writing style as traditional historiography. Aliqoli Mirza would become the pioneer of so-called Modern Historiography. He described his new technique as "abandoning the use of obligatory and praising titles and paying attention to the context and brevity of the history".

=== Other works ===
Aliqoli Mirza wrote various works in different fields, including history, astronomy, and poetry. Falak al-sa'ada, an 1861 essay on astrology as a pseudoscience, dismissed the belief in the auspicious or ominous influences of celestial bodies. His criticism of astrology followed the model of such classical scholars as Biruni, Farabi, and Avicenna. Aliqoli Mirza's progressive thoughts were very unusual for his era; he believed in the originality of human action and in free will. He translated Descartes' Discours de la methode with an introduction of Newton's works. History of events and accidents in Afghanistan, containing important information about the war with the British Empire, is considered the manifesto of Aliqoli Mirza's Modern Historiography.

Aliqoli Mirza also had many unpublished works, such as his divan Javaher-e Manzum under the pen name Fakhri; Arz al-Baladin, a short treatise on geodesy written in 1860, Rasad Khane-y Maragheh on the history of the Maragheh Observatory, and Joghrafiay-e Mahal-e Mazandaran on the geography of the Mazandaran province mostly modeled from Yaqut al-Hamawi's Mu'jam Al-Buldan.

== Legacy ==
Aliqoli Mirza has been described as one of the most influential intellectuals of the Qajar era. Across his many positions, his motivation was to spread modern European ideas in Iran and avoid the usual court quarrels. He was able to integrate aspects of modern European technological and educational advances, without losing sight of the achievements of his own culture, and apply them with tact to the Qajar environment. Hajj Sayyah, an intellectual and traveler, with all the criticisms he had of other high-ranking officials of the period, praised Aliqoli Mirza, stating that he was skillful, criticisable, and always ready to listen to suggestions. As an influential prince who could confront the shah's authority, he was able to withstand conservative pressure and displayed unorthodox views freely, especially in the areas of modern sciences and the study of religion. He patronised a generation of literary and cultural figures and even harbored non-conformists in his circle.

Aliqoli Mirza's literary circles of 1850s and 1860s included the poet Qaani, who with the help of the prince was introduced to the court of the Shah; the essayist Mirza Taher Isfahani; and Mirza Ahmad Kashani, a teacher of traditional medicine in Dar al-Fonun. His opponents generally accused him and his literary circle of nocturnal gatherings and hedonistic proclivities, including Ehtesham ol-Saltaneh, who condemned Aliqoli Mirza for womanising and holding drinking competitions.

Though by the standards of Amir Kabir's statesmanship, the achievements of his long tenure as minister were meager, he nevertheless was a realistic conduit for modernisation at a time when external and internal conditions were not favourable for such change. His career traits of cultural nationalism are visible in his patronage of Nameh-ye Daneshvaran and publication of historical and scientific works about Iran, as well as in his implicit support in the early 1860s for dissident figures, such as his brother Jalal al-Din Mirza and Mirza Malkam Khan's Faramosh Khaneh. His modernist nature reflected upon Dar ul-Funun as it later became one of the sources of the Iranian Enlightenment.

== Bibliography ==
- Amanat, Abbas (1998). "EʿTEŻĀD- AL- SALṬANA, ʿALĪQOLĪ MĪRZĀ". Encyclopædia Iranica, online edition. New York.
- Amiri, Zahra (2018). Life, works and historiography of Aliqoli Mirza Etezad os-Saltaneh (in Persian). Tehran: Farhang Bonyan Publications. ISBN 9786004671842.
- Amiri, Zahra (2008). "A study of the historiographical methods of Prince Aliqoli Mirza Etezadolsaltaneh". Journal of Historiography (in Persian). 36–37 (36): 1–18.
- Baghestani, Ismael (2009). "massive books of the Qajar era, case study: Name-ye Daneshvaran". Collection of articles of the first national conference on encyclopaedia in Iran. Tehran: Encyclopaedia Foundation of Iran. pp. 62–66. ISBN 9789645515223.
- Godarzi, Masoumeh; Dehghan Nežad, Morteza (Spring 2017). "The Evolution of Historiography in Etezadosaltaneh's Era". Journal of Historical Researches (in Persian). 9 (1): 23–40. doi:10.22108/JHR.2017.21389. OCLC 1244446711.
- Taheri, Mahbobeh; Sarafrazi, Abbas; Khajehmirza, Mahmoud; Asadbeigi, Ardeshir (Autumn 2020). "A Study of the Timeliness of Narrative in the Exir al-Tavarikh Based on Gerard Genet's Theory". Journal of Historical Perspective and Historiography (in Persian). 30 (25): 123–146. doi:10.22051/HPH.2021.32333.1455.
- Yaghmai, Eghbal (1967). "Aliqoli Mirza Etezad Al-Saltanah, First Minister of Sciences". Journal of Education (in Persian). 197–198 (197): 69–80.
