= Faramosh Khaneh =

Freemason-inspired secret society in Iran

- Persian: فراموش خانه, lit. 'House of Oblivion'
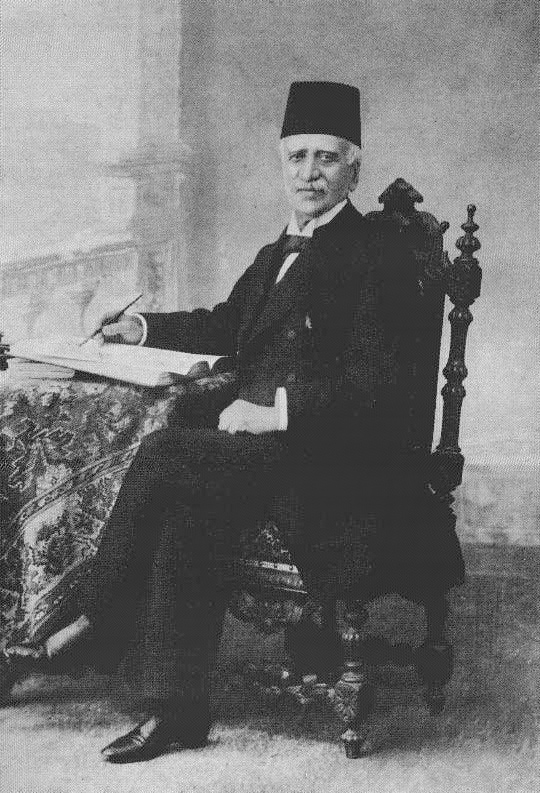
- Founder Mirza Malkam Khan
- Named after: Masonic Lodge
- Formation: 1859
- Founder: Mirza Malkam Khan
- Founded at: Tehran, Iran
- Dissolved: 1861; 165 years ago
- Type: Secret society
- Purpose: Political discussion, reformism
- Headquarters: House of Jalal al-Din Mirza Qajar

Faramosh Khaneh (Persian: فراموش خانه, lit. 'House of Oblivion') was one of the most influential secret societies during the constitutional period in Iran, based on Masonic lodges founded by Mirza Malkam Khan, an Iranian intellectual and writer. The idea of the Faramosh Khaneh was introduced during the reign of Nasser al-Din Shah after Mirza Malkam Khan returned to Iran from a trip to Britain, and with the consent of Nasser al-Din Shah, the House of Forgetfulness was established in 1859. The Faramosh Khaneh ideology was rooted in Malkam Khan's teachings of the socio-political teachings of nineteenth-century Europe, especially the French Revolution: teachings such as liberalism and humanism. Despite Malkam Khan's preparations, the wave of opposition rose very quickly. Although the internal organization of Faramosh Khaneh was derived from those Freemasonry lodges in Europe, Malkam Khan's Faramosh Khaneh had nothing to do with European Freemasonry circles.

Due to the lack of any kind of assembly and political group, Faramosh Khaneh was welcomed by various segments of the people, including politicians and students of Dar ul-Funun. In Faramosh Khaneh, the issue of tyranny, freedom, law and economic reforms to save the country from poverty and misery were discussed. Another important issue in this institution was to mention the progress of the West and to understand the secret of Iran's backwardness. Their meetings were held at the house of Jalal al-Din Mirza Qajar, but were led by Mirza Malkam Khan. Faramosh Khaneh was the first active and reformist secret society in Iran, and many members of this secret society later played a role during the Constitutional Revolution. Due to the intellectuals' inclination to Faramosh Khaneh for enlightenment, this secret society also played a major role in the Iranian Enlightenment.

== Etymology ==
Faramosh Khaneh was the name and equivalent that Mirza Malkam Khan used for Masonic lodges. Mirza Malkam Khan had declared the establishment of the Faramosh Khaneh to nurture and strengthen the brotherhood among its members and the progress of Iran, and according to the principles of authoritarianism that prevailed in Iran at that time, Malkam Khan thought the Masonic Lodge could be the best form of a political organization. Malkam Khan chose the name "Faramosh Khaneh" because it represents mystery. In fact, "Faramosh Khaneh" means House of Oblivion.

== History ==
Malkum Khan was educated in nineteenth-century France and was heavily influenced by 18th- and 19th-century French thinkers. He did not enter the lodges during his studies in France, and joined the lodge of the Saint-Sier Amité when he went to Paris with Farrokh Khan Amin al-Dawla as a consultant and translator to sign the Treaty of Paris. Malkam Khan, who founded Faramosh Khaneh, was initially accused of promoting republicanism and libertarianism. Some say that for the first time, the Republican whisper was raised during reign of Nasser al-Din Shah. Also from the middle of Faramosh Khaneh, which was founded and run by Malkam Khan. The members of Faramosh Khaneh sought a republic to be headed by Jalal al-Din Mirza Qajar, the Qajar prince, and to begin reforms. These whispers reached the king and terrified him. Faramosh Khaneh was established with the permission of Nasser al-Din Shah, but when the Shah heard that the people of Faramosh Khaneh were seeking to overthrow the monarchy, in 1861 he closed it and exiled Malkam Khan.

== Known or alleged members ==
- Mirza Malkam Khan (1834–1908), Iranian-Armenian politician, writer and intellectual
- Farrokh Khan (1812–1871), politician and later governor of Tabriz
- Jalal al-Din Mirza Qajar (1827–1872), historian and freethinker prince
- Hajj Sayyah (1836–1925), world traveler and political activist
