= Mirza Mohammad =

Mirza Mohammad may refer to:

- Mirza Mohammed, Guantanamo detainee
- Mirza Mohammad (Shah) (1749–1750), King of Persia
- Mírzá Muhammad ʻAlí, one of the sons of Bahá'u'lláh, the founder of the Bahá'í Faith
- Hajj Sayyah (Mirza Mohammad Ali), Iranian American world traveler and political activist
