= Sheikh Ahmad Rouhi =

Iranian writer, political thinker, and libertarian

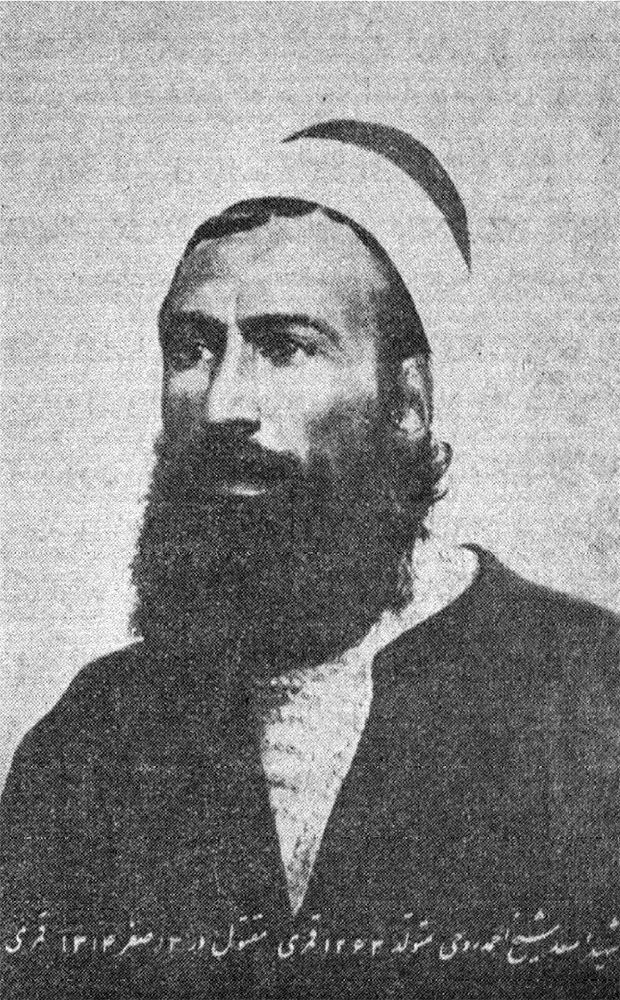
- Born: 15 April 1847; Kerman, Qajar Iran
- Died: 23 July 1896 (aged 41); Tabriz, Qajar Iran
- Literary movement: Intellectual movements in Iran
- Notable works: Hasht Behesht
- Spouse: Tal'at Azal (one of Subh-i-Azal's daughters)

Sheikh Ahmad Rouhi (Persian: شیخ احمد روحی) was an Iranian writer, political thinker, and libertarian. He is best known for his work with Mirza Aqa Khan Kermani and Jamāl al-Dīn al-Afghānī in Istanbul and for writing nationalist and libertarian works. His famous book, Hasht Behesht, is about Bábism beliefs and critiques of Baháʼí Faith.

== Life ==
Sheikh Ahmad Rouhi was born in Kerman in 1847, he was the second son of one of the prominent Bábist figures of Kerman.

In Kerman, he married one of Subh-i-Azal's daughters, Tal'at Azal. he was a preacher of Bábism and became popular among the people because of his kindness and trustworthiness.

In 1875 he went to Isfahan, Tehran, Rasht and Najaf with Mirza Aqa Khan Kermani and Mirza Hassan Khan Tabrizi and emigrated to Istanbul and continued his activities there.

His acquaintance with Jamāl al-Dīn al-Afghānī led them to political and social activities, and they worked with Mirza Hassan Khan Tabrizi to promote freedom-seeking ideas in their works. Letters sent by Mirza Aqa Khan Kermani and Sheikh Ahmad Rouhi, to Sheikh Hadi Najmabadi in Iran were sometimes so sensitive that, if discovered, the correspondents would be killed. After the assassination of Naser al-Din Shah, the Ottomans extradited Ahmad Rouhi, Mirza Hassan Khan, and Mirza Aga Khan, who had been imprisoned in Trabzon, to Iran. On July 17, 1896, Crown Prince Mohammad Ali Mirza beheaded them in the northern garden of Tabriz on charges of being Bábist and sent their heads full of straw to Tehran.

== Hasht Behesht ==
In Najaf, Sheikh Ahmad wrote his famous book, Hasht Behesht (The Eight Heavens). Hasht Behesht is one of the reference books on the beliefs of Bábism and a critical book on Baháʼí Faith and Baháʼu'lláh. Also in this book, Sheikh Ahmad Rouhi sees the Constitutional Revolution as the downfall for the Qajar dynasty.

Sheikh Ahmad Rouhi named the book based on the poem Hasht-Bihisht written by Amir Khusrau and praised him in one of the chapters of the book.

Most copies of Hasht Behesht were destroyed by Shia Islam fanatics in Iran, and Sheikh Ahmad Rouhi's family was persecuted for this book. But a copy was brought to Britain by the historian and orientalist Edward Grenville Brown.
