= Yousuf Khan Mostashar al-Dowleh =

Iranian writer and diplomat

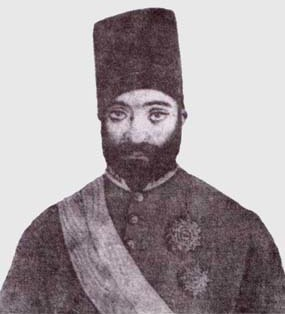

4th Ambassador of Iran to France
- In office 24 October 1867 – 2 December 1872
- Preceded by: Mahmud Khan Qaraguzlu
- Succeeded by: Mirza Malkam Khan

Personal details
- Born: 1828 Tabriz, Qajar Iran
- Died: 1895 (aged 66–67) Qazvin, Qajar Iran
- Profession: Writer, Diplomat

Yousuf Khan Mostashar al-Dowleh (Persian: یوسف‌خان مستشارالدوله) (1823–1895) was an Iranian writer, intellectual and diplomat. Mostashar al-Dowleh is best known for his treatise "A Word", which was known as one of the most secular treatises of the Qajar era. Together with Mirza Malkam Khan, he was one of the first to spread liberal ideas in Iran. He was eventually imprisoned for his views during the reign of Naser al-Din Shah Qajar and died three years later.

== Life ==
Mirza Yusuf Khan was born in Tabriz to an aristocratic family. Mostashar al-Dowleh was the consul general of Iran in Tbilisi from 1864 to 1867. At the same time, he corresponded with Mirza Fatali Akhundov, and with the help of Akhundov's ideas, Mostashar al-Dowleh wrote the treatise "Yusuf's Code". At the end of 1867, he was appointed as the Paris Chargé d'affaires, and according to his writings, he observed the Exposition Universelle and considered it "beautiful". At the same time he became a member of the Grand Orian Masonic Lodge. Mostashar al-Dowleh completed the famous treatise "One Word" in Paris in the last months of his service there and showed it to Akhundov on the way back to Iran in 1870 in Tbilisi. This treatise was published in 1874 in Iran. In 1882, when Mirza Yahya Mushir al-Dawla came to the Ministry of Justice, he appointed him as his deputy and issued the title of Mostashar al-Dowleh after him, but he resigned from the judiciary due to extortion and corruption in the judiciary. At that time, the Akhtar Istanbul newspaper published criticisms of the Iranian courts, and on the suspicion that he was involved in publishing those criticisms, he was accused and dismissed by the order of Naser al-Din Shah and sentenced to five months in prison.

In 1889, Mostashar al-Dowleh, who was an agent in Azerbaijan, wrote a detailed letter to Crown Prince Mozaffar al-Din Mirza through Hassan Ali Khan Grossi, the governor of Azerbaijan, asking them to pass it on to the Shah. In that letter, he called for authoritarian rule and corruption in the court of criticism and state reform, the establishment of the rule of law, and the establishment of freedom and equality. After his letter reached Naser al-Din Shah, he was imprisoned on the Shah's orders. Mostashar al-Dowleh was imprisoned for the second time. He was sentenced to life imprisonment and so tortured that he died three years later in 1895 in prison. After the Constitutional Revolution, he rose to prominence as an intellectual among the educated class. Writers later wrote about him, calling him one of the first Iranian libertarian and modernist writers.

== Bibliography ==
- Yusuf's Code, Based on his correspondence with Akhundov
- Treatise on the necessity of reforming the script of Islam
- Purple booklet, In order to build a railway in Iran
- One Word, a 19th-century Persian treatise by Mirza Yusof Khan Mustashar ad-Dowla Tabrizi, introducing Western codified law (bilingual edition with a historical introduction), Leiden University Press, 2010.
