= Mirza Abdul'Rahim Talibov Tabrizi =

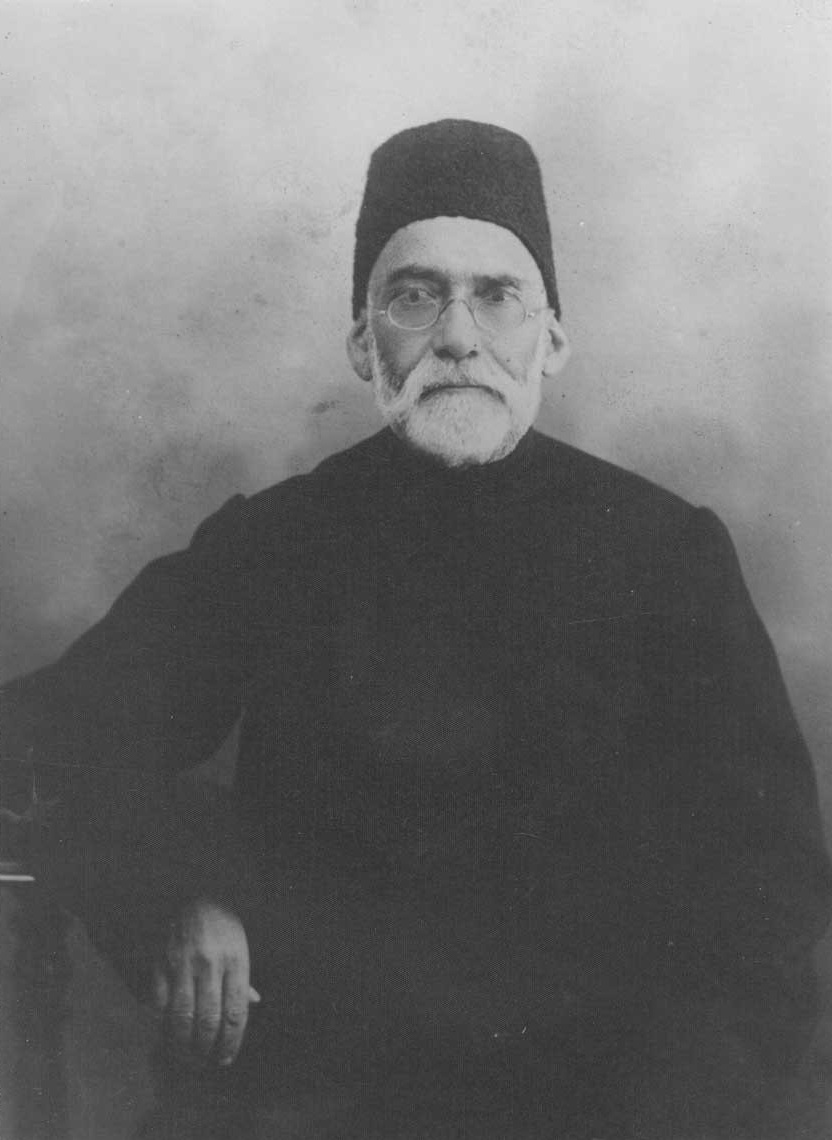
- Mirzā Abdul'Rahim Tālibi
- Born: 1834; Sorkhab, Tabriz district, Iran
- Died: 1911 (aged 76–77)
- Occupations: writer, intellectual and social reformer

Mirzā Abdul'Rahim Tālibi Najjār Tabrizi (1834, Tabriz — 1911, Temir-Khan-Shura, named Buinaksk since 1922) (Persian: ميرزا عبدالرحیم طالبی نجار تبریزی), also known as Talibov (طالبوف), was an Iranian Azerbaijani intellectual and social reformer.

== Early life and education ==
He was born in the Sorkhab district of Tabriz, Iran. Both his father, Abu-Tālib Najjār Tabrizi, and grandfather, Ali-Morad Najjār Tabrizi, were carpenters (whence the name Najjār). No information concerning the maternal side of his family is available.

In 1851, Talibi emigrated to Tbilisi (Tiflis), the administrative capital of the Russian Caucasus, and began a new life there (see Treaty of Gulistan and Treaty of Turkmenchay). According to one Iranian source, Talibi attended school in Tbilisi and studied modern sciences, however there is no independent evidence in support of this report. It has been suggested that Talibi may in fact never have received a formal education in Russia. In a letter written to an Iranian friend, he indicated that he produced his major works through relying on personal reading and self-discipline.

== Career ==
In Tbilisi, Talibi worked for an Iranian businessman, named Mohammad-Ali Khan, who had emigrated to Transcaucasia from the city of Kashan. Mohammad-Ali Khan was a contractor who had accumulated much of his wealth from obtaining concessions for construction of roads and bridges in Transcaucasia. After years of working for the wealthy compatriot, Talibi must have saved a sufficient amount of capital to start his own construction business. He also moved from Tbilisi to Temir-Khan-Shura (Buinaksk, since 1922), the provincial capital of Dagestan, where he bought a comfortable house, built a small private library and married a woman from Derbent.

Talibi wrote all of his works after the age of fifty-five. He had by then attained a degree of financial security that enabled him to devote the next twenty-one years of his life to writing and translating from Russian into Persian. With the exception of his last two books, he published all of his works at his own expense. Of his last two books, the first, Īzāhāt dar Khosus-e Azādi (Explanations Concerning Freedom), was published in Tehran after the victory of the Iranian Constitutional Revolution of 1906, and the second, Siyāsat-e Tālibi (Tālibian Politics), was published posthumously in Tehran a few months after his death in 1911.

During his lifetime, two of Talibi's works, namely Ketāb-e Ahmad yā Safineh-ye Tālebi (Ahmad's Book or the Talibian Vessel) and Masālek'ol-Moh'senin (The Ways of the Charitable), achieved great eminence. Ketāb-e Ahmad, which consists of two volumes, was inspired by Jean-Jacques Rousseau's tract on education Emile. The book is based on conversations between the author and his fictional seven-year-old son, Ahmad, whose searching and inquisitive mind compels his father to expand on a wide range of scientific, historical, political and religious topics. Their dialogue on these issues reveal Talibi's social reformism.

The Ways of the Charitable involves four characters: Mustafa and Hossein who are engineers, a physician named Ahmed, and Muhammad who is a chemistry teacher. They are appointed by a fictional geographic administration of Iran to travel to Damavand mountain for scientific studies and measurement. They encounter a number of spaces and characters on their way—from a mujtahid to a dervish to shoemaker—and these encounters attempt to demonstrate Iran’s problems. These problems are political, social, and scientific. Kings live in luxury while the country’s infrastructure is crumbling; European cities enjoy wealth and application of sciences while Iranian cities lack them; other nations unite with a spirit of reform and talk at lengths to make their nation a better place while Iranians are silent about their problems, alienated from one another, and set in archaic, ancestral ways; the Qajar ministries are mere imitations without any institutional foundation and government officials are not appointed based on merit; education too is in a poor condition and no books are written for the advancement of sound pedagogy.

== See also ==
- Mirza Fatali Akhundzadeh
- Mohammad-Ali Jamalzadeh
- Mirza Aqa Khan Kermani
- Mirza Jahangir Khan
