= Mirza Jahangir Khan =

Iranian intellectual (c. 1870/75–1908)

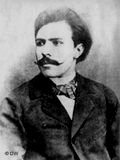
- Mirza Jahangir khan in 1908
- Native name: میرزا جهانگیرخان
- Born: 1870 or 1875 Shiraz, Sublime State of Iran
- Died: 23 June 1908 Tehran, Sublime State of Iran
- Cause of death: Execution
- Occupation: Journalist, Writer
- Education: Dar al-Fonun

Mirzā Jahāngir Khān (Persian: میرزا جهانگیرخان; c. 1870 or 1875, Shiraz — 23 June 1908, Tehran), also known as Mirzā Jahāngir Khān Shirāzi and Jahāngir-Khān-e Sūr-e-Esrāfil, was an Iranian writer and intellectual, and a revolutionary during the Iranian Constitutional Revolution (1905–1911).

He is best known for his editorship of the progressive and satirical weekly newspaper Sur-e Esrāfil, of which he was also the founder. He was executed, at the age of 38, or 32, for his revolutionary zeal, following the successful coup d'état of Mohammad Ali Shah Qajar in June 1908. His execution took place in Bāgh-e Shāh (باغشاه - The Shah's Garden) in Tehran, and was attended by Mohammad Ali Shah himself. He shared this fate simultaneously with his fellow revolutionary Mirzā Nasro'llah Beheshti, better known as Malek al-Motakallemin. It has been reported that immediately before his execution he had said "Long live the constitutional government" (Zendeh bād Mashrouteh) and pointed to the ground and uttered the words "O Land, we are [being] killed for the sake of your preservation [/protection]" (Ey Khāk, mā barāye hefz-e to koshteh shodim).

== Biography ==
Mirzā Jahāngir Khān was born to a relatively impoverished family from Shiraz. In his youth he studied Persian literature, logic, philosophy and mathematics with the masters of these subjects in his birthplace Shiraz. He later moved to Tehran where he embarked on studying modern sciences at the élite school of Dar ol-Fonoon and some other centres of learning available in this city at his time. At the inception of the movement leading to the Constitutional Revolution, he joined a number of underground groups of revolutionaries and before long became one of the main pillars of the Revolution. He became a devotee of Hāj Sheikh Hādi Najmābādi. Although it is known that Mirzā Jahāngir Khān was an Azali Bábí, we do not know whether he became a Bábí in Shiraz, the cradle of Bábism, or in Tehran.

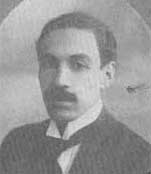
Ghāsem Sur-e Esrāfil

Through part of the legislative period of the First Majles, Mirzā Jahāngir Khān published the Sur-e Esrāfil weekly newspaper as its editor, receiving financial backing for this enterprise from Ghāsem Sur-e Esrāfil (قاسم صور اسرافیل), son of Mirzā Hasan Khān Tabrizi. The first edition of Sur-e Esrāfil was published on Thursday 30 May 1907 (8 Khordād 1286 AH); one year and six days later, on Thursday 4 June 1908 (14 Khordād 1287 AH), Mirzā Jahāngir Khān was arrested and executed. The circulation of Sur-e Esrāfil is said to have been approximately 20,000; the number of printed copies of this newspaper had been as high as 24,000. It was during this period that he overtly attacked the deposed Mohammad Ali Shah, a fact that did not pass unnoticed either by the latter or by his own devoted following, making him by equal measures both hated and loved.

One of the most celebrated literary figures of the time who contributed to Sur-e Esrāfil was Ali-Akbar Dehkhodā. His satirical political column, named Charand o Parand (Balderdash and Piffle) and signed by such imaginary figures as Dakhoo, Dakhoo-Ali, Khar-Magas (Gad-fly), Ruz-Numeh-Chi (Journalist) Gholām-Gedā Āzād Khān-e Ali-Allāhi, Khādem ol-Foqarā Dakhoo-Ali Shāh, Nokhod-e Hameh Āsh (Busy-Body), Be'rah'neh-ye Khosh'hāl (The Happy Destitute), proved both popular and controversial.

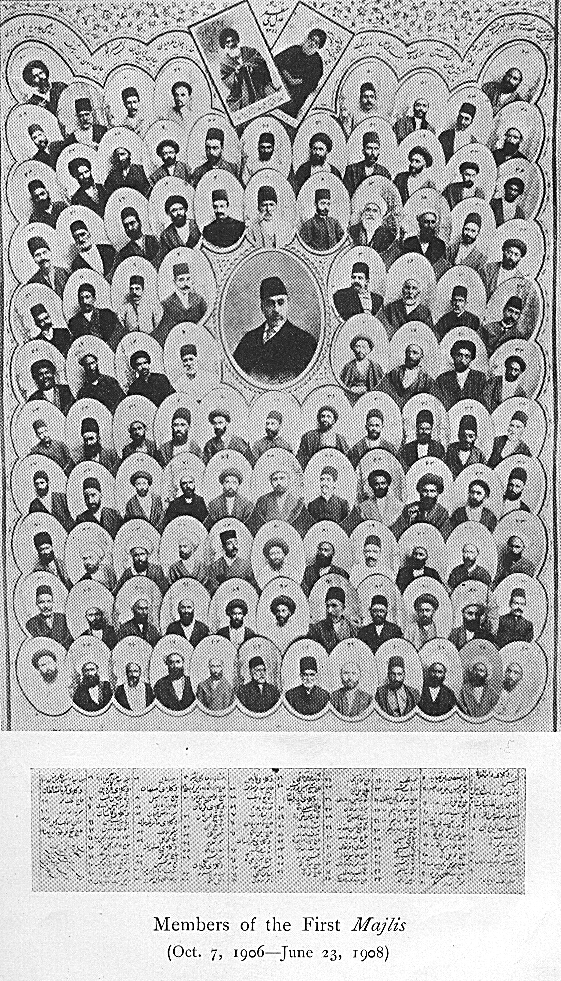
Members of the First Majles (7 October 1906 — 23 June 1908). The central photograph is that of Mortezā Qoli Khan Sani od-Dauleh, the first Chairman of the First Majles. He had been for seven months the Finance Minister when he was assassinated on 6 February 1911 by two Georgian nationals in Tehran.

Further, Sur-e Esrāfil

"played an important role in the political scene by supporting the Constitutional Movement and the paper ran many articles which were aimed at exposing the despotism, dependency, and corruption of the monarchy and the traditional views of the reactionary clergy. The paper was among the first to use ordinary language of the common people in place of the traditional didactic and flowery literary approach popular at the time among the literary circles and men of erudition. It identified with the masses and it could be understood by them and in this sense, it did not only play an important political role but also one of literary significance by establishing a new modern style of writing and journalism in Iran. Sur Esrafil [Sur-e Esrāfil] was popular newspaper among the people and was the first of its kind to be sold in busy street corners by children and petty city vendors and peddlers."

During the coup d'état of Mohammad-Ali Shah, the Russian-led Cossack Brigade, commanded by Colonel Vladimir Liakhov, shelled and subsequently laid siege to the seat of Majles. Mirzā Jahāngir Khān, together with some deputies who had taken refuge inside the Majles compound, escaped through an opening in the siege and took refuge to the house of Mirzā Mohsen Khān Amin ad-Dauleh.

Amin ad-Dauleh gave refuge to [Sayyed Abdollah] Behbahāni (later, in 1910, to be assassinated for his pro-British activities), [Sayyed Mohammad] Tabataba'i and some others, however declined to give sanctuary to Mirzā Jahāngir Khān, Malek al-Motakallemin and two or three of other escapees. It is not known why Amin ad-Dauleh should have withheld vital support from these men, however both Mirzā Jahāngir Khān and Malek al-Motakallemin were Bábís and thus apostates in the eyes of many of their contemporaries. It is, however, conceivable that Amin al-Daouleh may have deemed that giving sanctuary to these men would prove fatal to his own life, given the fact that Mohammad-Ali Shah had come to consider in particular Malek al-Motakallemin as "among the most dangerous of his enemies." Be it as it may, it has been reported that Amin ad-Dauleh not only declined to provide these men with sanctuary, but that he subsequently contacted Bāgh-e Shāh, by telephone, and betrayed both, following which Shah's soldiers arrested these men and executed them in Bāgh-e Shāh in the presence of Mohammad-Ali Shah himself.

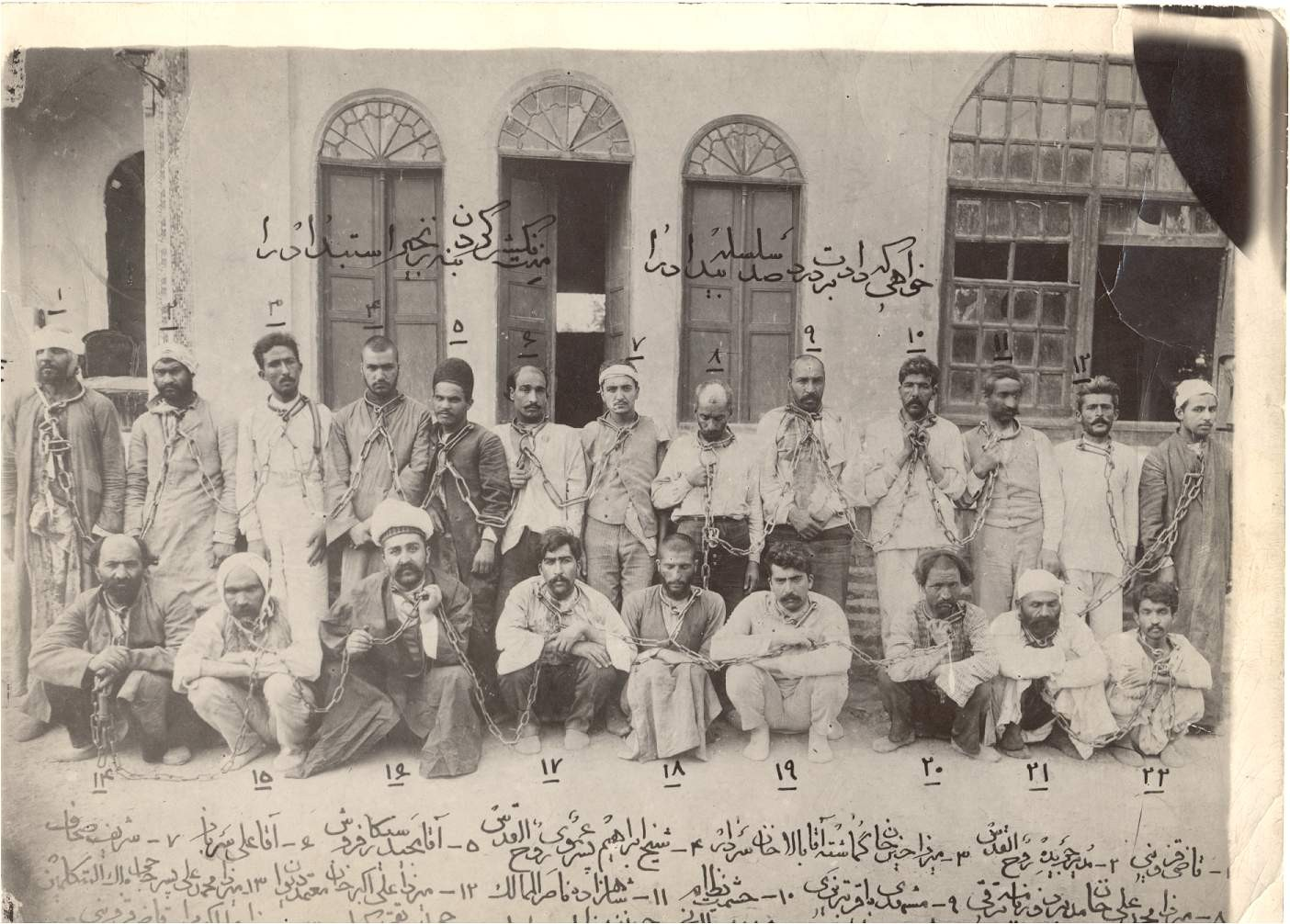
Some mistreated and shackled prisoners held in Bāgh-e Shāh, arrested following the successful coup d'état of Mohammad-Ali Shah. The left-most person standing (marked by 1) is Qāzi Qazvini, a Judge, who escaped from the Majles compound together with Mirzā Jahāngir Khān, Malek al-Motakallemin and some other Deputies. The person standing next to him is Soltān ol-Olamā', Editor of Ruh ol-Qods (The Holy Spirit) newspaper. The eighth person standing is Mirzā Mohammad-Ali Khān, Editor of Taraqqi (Progress) newspaper. The right-most person standing (marked by 13) is named as "Mirzā Mohammad-Ali, son of Hāji Malek al-Motakallemin".

== Later developments ==
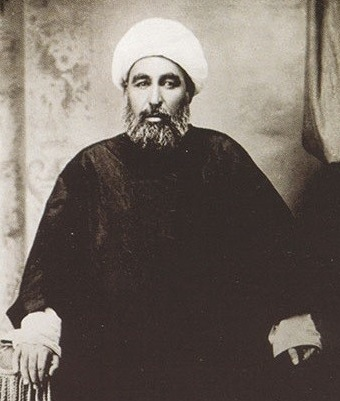
Mirzā Nasr'ollah Beheshti, known as Malek al-Motakallemin (King of Orators).

Following the executions of Mirzā Jahāngir Khān and Malek al-Motakallemin, Mohammad-Ali Shah's Cossacks abandoned their bodies in a moat outside the walls of Bāgh-e Shāh. On this news reaching their friends, at night-time they buried the bodies of these men in the same or a nearby location. Following the overthrow of Mohammad-Ali Shah Qajar, these burials received some measure of official recognition and the graves were marked by stones engraved by the names of the men.

With the extension of Tehran, this part of the city later became a residential area and the family of Malek al-Motakallemin built a house whose walls enclosed the graves; it became the residential home of one of Malek al-Motakallemin's sons, Asado'llah Malek-Zādeh. This house is now adjacent to Loqman od-Dauleh Adham General Hospital on Kamāli Street. The planned enlargement of this hospital foresees absorption of this house into the hospital; the parking area of the hospital has been named as a possible location of which the grounds of this house may become a part. The extant family of Malek al-Motakallemin have expressed their willingness to provide for the funds necessary for the preservation of the graves. The neglect by the National Heritage Ministry of this historical house, leading to the planned extension of Loqman od-Dauleh Adham General Hospital into the grounds of this house reaching such an advanced stage, is most regrettable; one is painfully reminded of the construction of the Sivand Dam and the inundation of the Bolaghi Gorge.

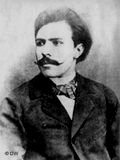
Mirzā Jahāngir Khān

A statue of Malek al-Motakallemin — made by the same artist, Abol-Hasan Khan Sadiqi, and from the same material and in the same dimensions as the statue of Ferdowsi (see Tehran's Ferdowsi Square) was during the Pahlavi régime removed from the Hasan Abad Square (after the Iranian Revolution of 1979 renamed "31 Shah'rivar Square") and put in the care of Parks Authorities who stored it inside the headquarters of the organisation; it is believed that the Palace was opposed to the public display of this statue.

In 1999, this statue was transferred from this location to a storehouse of The City Park (Park-e Shahr) of Tehran. In April 2006, this statue was declared as missing and this remains the case to this date. It is ironic that while subsequent to the Iranian Revolution it was decided to erect Malek al-Motakallemin's statue at his graveside, not only has this statue in the meantime gone missing, but also, as it stands, the very continuation of the existence of this graveside into future seems now more uncertain than ever before.

== See also ==
- Ebrahim Poordavood
- Mirza Abdul'Rahim Talibov Tabrizi
- Mohammad-Ali Jamalzadeh
- Sayyed Hasan Taqizadeh
