= Mirzadeh Eshghi =

Iranian writer and poet (1894–1924)

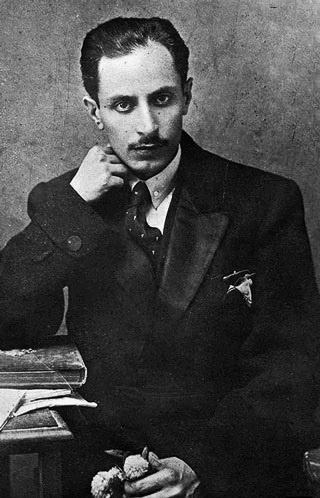
- Mirzadeh Eshghi
- Born: Mohammed Reza Kordestani; 11 December 1894; Hamadan, Sublime State of Iran
- Died: 3 August 1924 (aged 29); Tehran, Sublime State of Iran
- Cause of death: Assassination; Murdered by two unknown gunmen
- Occupations: Political writer and poet

Sayed Mohammad Reza Kordestani (Persian: سید محمدرضا کردستانی; 11 December 1894 – 3 July 1924) was an Iranian political writer and poet who used the pen name Mirzadeh Eshghi (Persian: میرزاده عشقی).

== Biography ==
He was born in Hamadan, the son of Hajj Sayed Abolghasam Kordestani; he learned French in the Ecole d'Alliance, and moved to Constantinople for a while. He is particularly famous for writing the opera Rastakhiz Shahryaran (Resurrection of the kings), which was a reflection of his patriotic spirit.

After returning to Iran and spending time with his family in Tehran, he published newspapers in which he fiercely attacked the political system of Iran. He is remembered for writing six plays; his Noruz nameh is particularly famous. He also published a paper called Twentieth Century and predicted his early death repeatedly.

== Death ==
Eshghi was murdered by two unknown gunmen in his home in Tehran. He was buried in Ibn Babawayh Cemetery in Shahr-e Ray, near Tehran.

== Works ==
Plays

- Opera-ye Rastakhiz-e Mehr-e Yaran (Written in Istanbul)
- Kafan-e Siah or Black Shroud (Written in Tehran)
- Resurrected Iranian Kings (Written in Istanbul)
