= Qanun (newspaper) =

Persian newspaper in London (1890–1898)

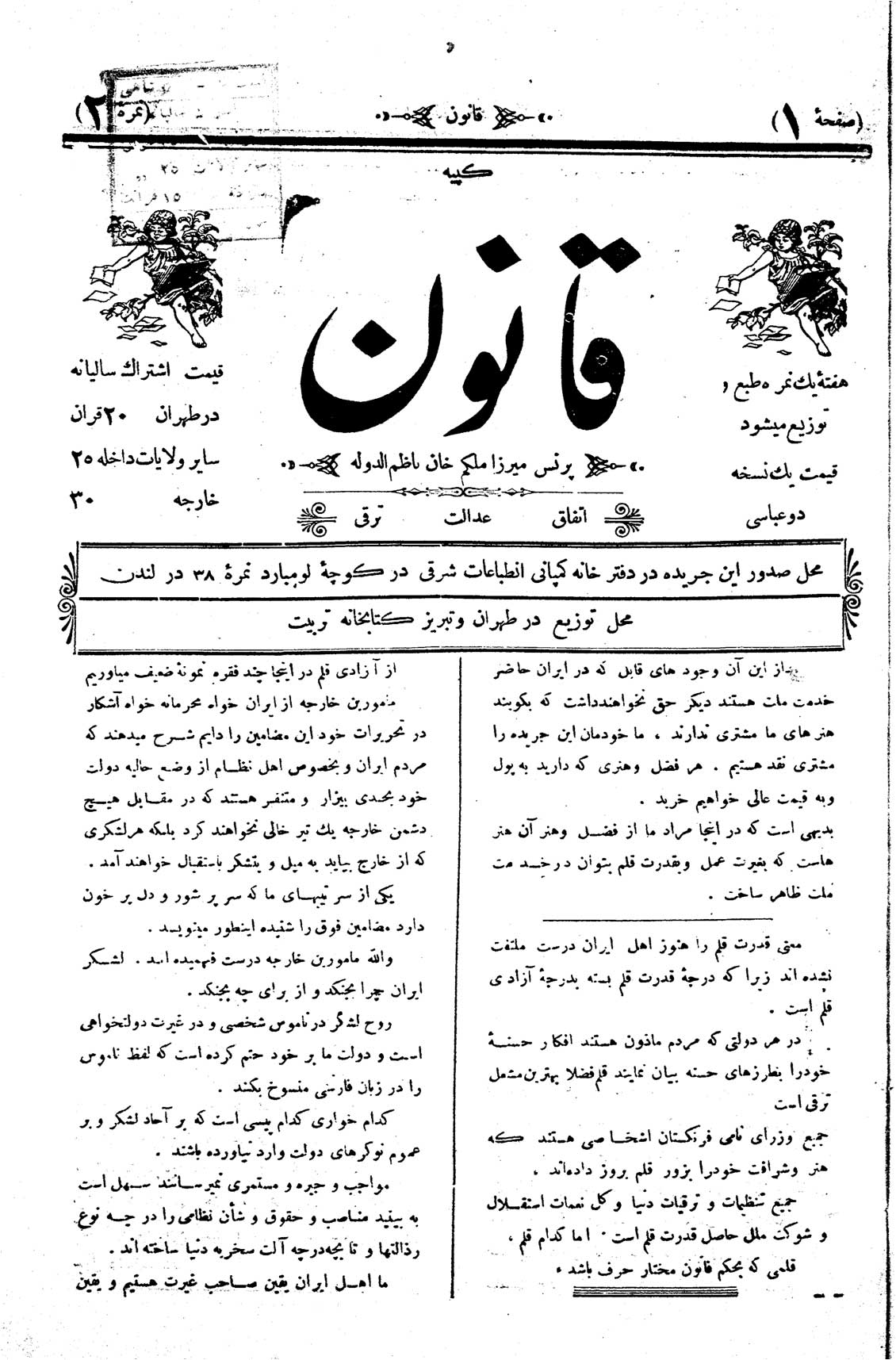
- Cover page of Qanun
- Type: Monthly newspaper
- Owner: Mirza Malkam Khan
- Founder: Mirza Malkam Khan
- Publisher: Mirza Malkam Khan
- Editor-in-chief: Mirza Malkam Khan
- Founded: 20 February 1890
- Ceased publication: 1898
- Political alignment: Constitutionalist
- Language: Persian
- Headquarters: London
- Country: Great Britain

Qanun (Persian: قانون, lit. 'Law') was a monthly newspaper which was published in London in 1890–1898. The founder and editor of the paper was Mirza Malkam Khan who served as Qajar Iran's envoy to Britain and Italy. It is known to be the first oppositional publication of Iran and was one of the publications which improved the political awareness of Iranians.

== History and profile ==
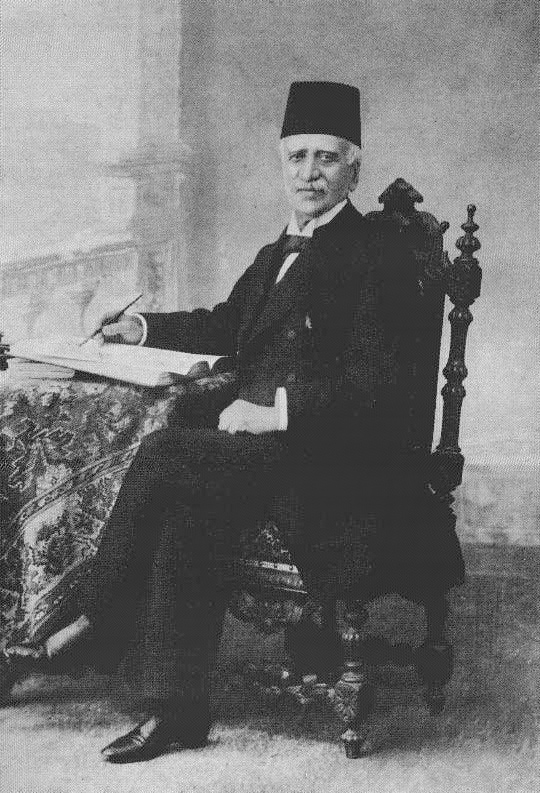
Mirza Malkam Khan, founder, editor, and publisher of Qanun

Qanun was established by Mirza Malkam Khan in 1890, and the first issue appeared on 20 February 1890. Although Mirza Malkam Khan had been the envoy of Qajar Iran to London, at some point he became an ardent critic of Naser al-Din Shah Qajar and started Qanun to attack him. Before his establishment of the paper Mirza Malkam Khan had been fired by the Shah from the post, but he did not return to Iran and stayed in London. The predecessor of Qanun was Mirza Malkam Khan's work entitled Daftar-e Qanun (1860; Persian: Manual of Law). Initial audience of Qanun was the members of a defunct secret society established by Mirza Malkam Khan in Tehran in 1858. The paper was published in a simple format and employed a plain version of Persian language. Between its start in 1890 and 1892, Qanun was published on a monthly basis.

Although the paper was banned in Iran because of its bitter criticism against the Qajar rule it was clandestinely circulated there. However, its readers were arrested and punished when they were found to possess the paper. On the other hand, Qanun enjoyed popularity among Iranians living in various cities, including Istanbul, Nizir, Zanjan and Sarjan. The paper was first circulated in Istanbul shortly after its start in 1890.

In 1898, Mirza Malkam Khan was appointed the envoy of Qajar Iran to Italy and stopped the publication of Qanun after producing 42 issues. The issues of Qanun are archived by the Cambridge University Library.

== Content and political stance ==
Mirza Malkam Khan collaborated with two Qajar opponents, namely Jamal al-Din al-Afghani and Mirza Aqa Khan Kermani, in his attacks against Qajar rule in Qanun. Of them the former was a pan-Arabist and the latter was based in Istanbul. The paper also attacked Naser al-Din Shah's Prime Minister, Amin al-Soltan. In addition, the paper harshly criticised policies of the Qajar administration such as the tobacco concession dated 1890. It frequently contained articles supporting a constitutional and fair rule in Iran. In this regard Ottoman Sultan Abdul Hamid's regime was given as a potential model for Iran. The paper often praised Abdul Hamid in other points as well.

Mirza Malkam Khan also published articles on the religion of humanity in an attempt to introduce Western ideas to Iranians in regard to religious matters. However, the paper supported Islamic unity, and each issue of the paper began with a prayer in Arabic and ended with a religious note stating that readers forgave the news and writings if they were erroneous or contrary to the premises of Islam.

Although Qanun contained secular and progressive articles, there was no specific reference to women-related issues and their rights.
