= Qazi Ardaghi =

Iranian revolutionary figure

- قاضی ارداقی
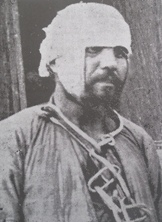
- Qazi Ardaghi after the bombardment of the Iranian parliament
- Born: ملا علی; 1866; Ardagh, Qajar Iran
- Died: 1908 (aged 41–42); Tehran, Qajar Iran
- Children: At least 1 son named Farshad

Molla Ali (Persian: ملا علی), better known as Qazi Ardaghi (Persian: قاضی ارداقی) was an Iranian cleric, judge and revolutionary figure. He was the first principal of the Omid School and a member of the Meykade Garden secret society.

== Life ==
Molla Ali was born in 1866 in Ardagh and was educated first by his father Molla Taqi and then in the Sardar Madrasa in Qazvin. He was one of the 12 prominent followers of Jamal al-Din Asadabadi who joined him during the latter's time in sanctuary in the Shah Abdol-Azim Shrine. He then travelled to Karbala and Najaf and after completing his education, returned to Iran during the last years of the reign of Mozaffar ad-Din Shah Qajar.

In 1904, he and 54 other prominent constitutionalist dissidents formed a secret society called the Meykade Garden secret society with the aim to remove the Qajar dynasty from power.

In 1905, Asef ad-Dowleh who was at the time the governor of Qazvin established the Omid School as the first modern school in Qazvin and assigned Molla Ali as the principal of the school.

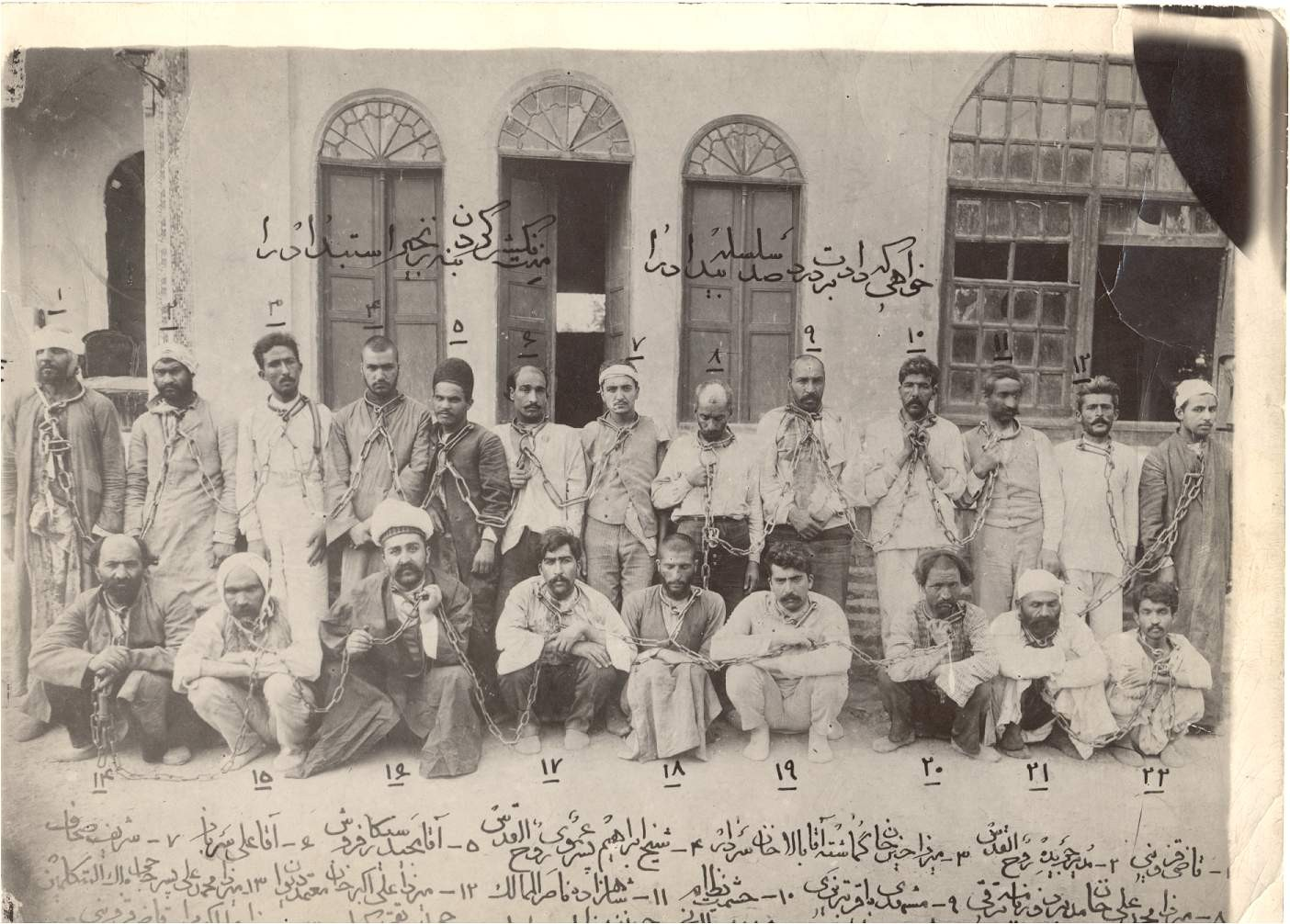
A group of prisoners in Baghshah, Qazi Ardaghi is the first person standing from left.

Molla Ali moved from Qazvin to Tehran in the early days of the Constitutional era and joined the judiciary, which gave him the nickname Qazi Ardaghi, "The Ardaghi Judge". As a judge, he severely punished many of the preparators of the Toopkhane Square Incident acquitted the people accused of plotting the failed assassination attempt on Mohammad Ali Shah Qajar. Due to his anti Shah positions, he was one of the seven people who the Shah demanded the parliament to be arrested, which was refused by the parliament.

Following the bombardment of the Iranian Parliament, Qazi Ardaghi along with a group of constitutionalists were arrested and subsequently killed in Baghshah. After Malek al-Motekallemin and Mirza Jahangir Khan Sur Esrafil, Qazi Ardaghi was the third person to be killed.
