= Hajj Sayyah =

Iranian American traveller and political activist 1836–1925

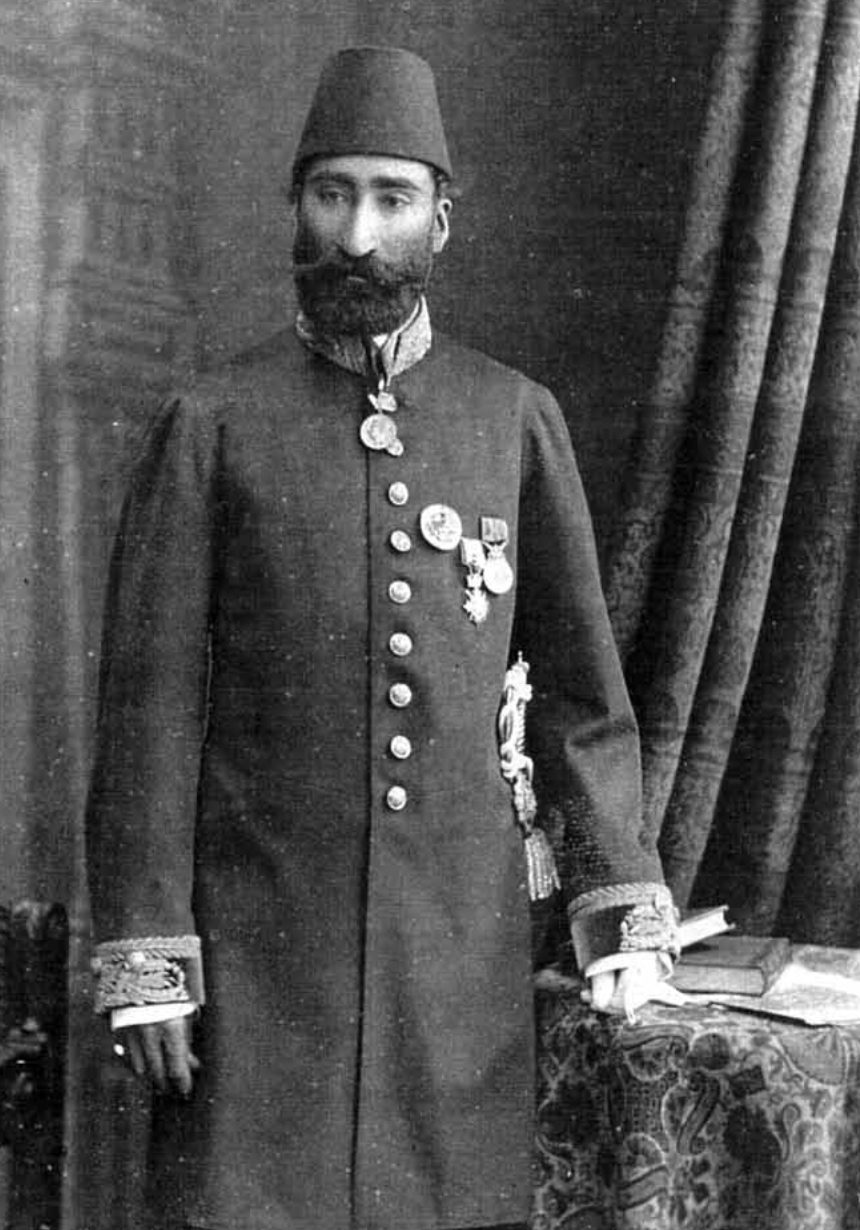
Hajj Sayyah

Mirza Mohammad Ali (Persian: میرزا محمد علی), better known as Hajj Sayyah (Persian: حاج سياح, lit. 'Hajji Traveler'; 1836–1925), was an Iranian American world traveler and political activist.

He was the first Iranian to obtain American citizenship. According to a decree issued by the District Court of the 12th Judicial District of the State of California, he was naturalized on May 26, 1875.

== Early life ==
Hajj Sayyah was born in 1836 in the town of Mahallat, Sublime State of Iran. His studies exposed him at a young age to modern and democratic ideas that were then spreading throughout parts of the world. The stark differences that he observed between the autocratic rule in Iran and those ideas he studied inspired him to see the rest of the world.

== Travels ==
At the age of 23, Hajj Sayyah embarked on a remarkable journey around the globe, and which would last for nearly 18 years. He began his travels by wandering throughout Central Asia and Europe for more than six years. Often, he traveled alone and in poverty.

The motivation for his travels was his thirst for knowledge and spiritual strength. He wanted to learn as much as he could about the world and how other people lived to bring those ideas back to Iran. As a result of his observations throughout his travels, he concluded that human beings are supposed to live in reasonably-humane societies and, to enjoy basic human rights.

Hajj Sayyah came to the United States through New York City. During his ten-year stay in the country, he met with many prominent personalities such as US President Ulysses Grant on more than one occasion. His travels across the United States eventually took him to San Francisco, where he spent several months.

In the course of studying Hajj Sayyahʼs life, Dr. Ali Ferdowsi discovered through State Department documents that Hajj Sayyah had become a US citizen on May 26, 1875, the first Iranian to do so.

== Political activism ==
Upon returning to Iran in July 1877, Hajj Sayyah became politically active and was imprisoned for having instigated a clandestine letter writing campaign to Naser al-Din Shah Qajar and the clergy regarding the unbearable living conditions in Iran. After his release, fearing further persecution he sought the protection of the US legation in Tehran. That move puzzled many Iranians, who wondered why he felt that the US government would protect him.

Hajj Sayyah went on to play a major role in the 1906 Persian Constitutional Revolution, and he remained active until his death in 1925, at the age of 89.
