= Mirza Malkam Khan =

Iranian writer, diplomat and publicist (1834–1908)

Mirza Melkum Khan Nazem od-Dowleh
- میرزا ملکم‌خان
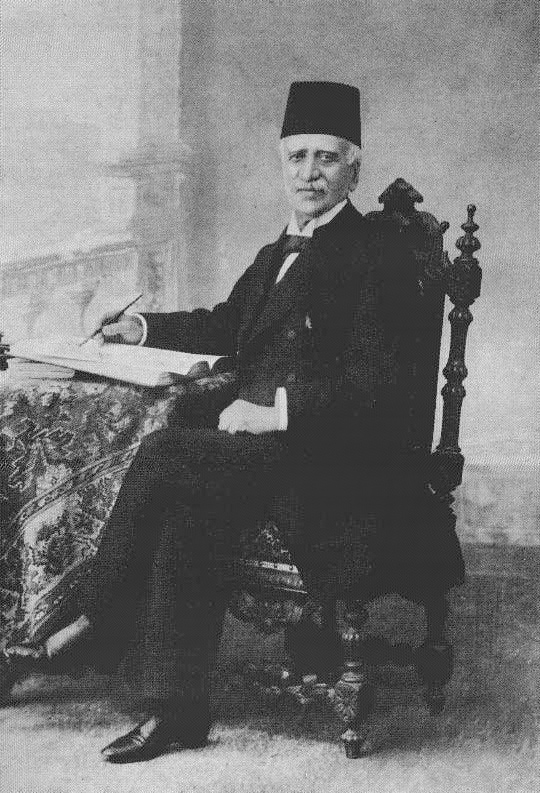
- Mirza Melkum Khan

1st Ambassador of Iran to Austria
- In office 1872–1878
- Monarch: Naser al-Din Shah Qajar
- Preceded by: Position created
- Succeeded by: Emanuel Goldberger de Buda

Ambassador of Iran to the United Kingdom
- In office 1872–1889
- Monarch: Naser al-Din Shah Qajar
- Preceded by: Muhsin Khan Mo'in al-Molk
- Succeeded by: Mohammad-Ali Ala ol-Saltaneh

Ambassador of Iran to Germany
- In office 1878–1889
- Monarch: Naser al-Din Shah Qajar

Ambassador of Iran to Italy
- In office 1899–1908
- Monarch: Mozaffar al-Din Shah Qajar
- Preceded by: Nariman Qawam al-Saltana
- Succeeded by: Mohammad Ebrahim Ghaffari

Personal details
- Born: 1834 New Julfa, Sublime State of Iran
- Died: 1908 (aged 73–74) Rome, Kingdom of Italy
- Children: Freydoun Malkom
- Occupation: Politician, diplomat, publisher, translator

Mirza Melkum Khan (Persian: میرزا ملکم خان; Armenian: Յովսէփ Մելքումեան, romanized: Hovsep’ Melk’umyan; 1834–1908), titled Nazem od-Dowleh (Persian: ناظم‌الدوله), was an Iranian modernist writer, diplomat, and publicist. He is known for his social reform efforts, as well as for being the first Christian to adopt the title of 'Mirza' in Persian. He is considered one of the fathers of the Iranian Constitutional Revolution.

== Biography ==
Melkum Khan was born to an Armenian Christian family in Iran and educated at the Samuel Muradian school in Paris from 1843 to 1851. He later returned to Iran and entered government service. In 1852, he was elected as instructor at the newly established Polytechnic in Tehran, the Dar ul-Funun. In 1857, he went to Paris in a diplomatic service.

In 1859, Melkum Khan introduced societies similar to the Freemasons in Iran and, in 1862, was exiled by Naser al-Din Shah Qajar for doing so. He was later pardoned and given a post at the embassy in Constantinople. There, two years later, he married the daughter of Arakel, a prominent Armenian, with the ceremony taking place in an Armenian church. He returned to Tehran in 1872 as assistant to Grand Vizier Mirza Hosein Khan Moshir od-Dowleh, and became the chief of the Persian legation in London (and later ambassador) in 1872. He remained in the position until 1888, and lost his position in 1889 as the result of a scandal over selling a cancelled concession for a lottery. Naser al-Din Shah explains in his third trip's memoir how he went to Mirza Melkum Khan's house one evening, met his wife and his three daughters, two of them as old as 19-20 and the third one who was 6 at the time (1889).

From London, Melkum Khan attacked both the shah and the Iranian government, and edited the newssheet Qanun, which was banned in Iran but read by the shah and his ministers. Melkum Khan eventually became recognised as the most important Persian moderniser of the century, and he was later pardoned and reinstated as ambassador to Italy by Mozaffar ad-Din Shah, Nasser ad-Din Shah's son and successor, in 1898 with the title of Nezam od-Dowleh. He remained ambassador to Italy until his death in 1908.

== See also ==
- Freydoun Malkom
