= Battle of Odesa =

Battle of Odesa refers to one of several military engagements in the city of Odesa, Ukraine:

- Attack on Odesa during the Black Sea raid in 1914 during World War I
- Odessa Operation (1919), during the Russian Civil War
- Odessa Operation (1920), during the Russian Civil War
- Siege of Odessa (1941), during World War II
- Odesa strikes (2022–present), during the ongoing Russian invasion of Ukraine
