= Odesa Operation =

Odesa Operation may refer to:

- Odesa Operation (1919)
- Odesa Operation (1920)
