= Sattar Khan =

Iranian national hero (1866–1914)

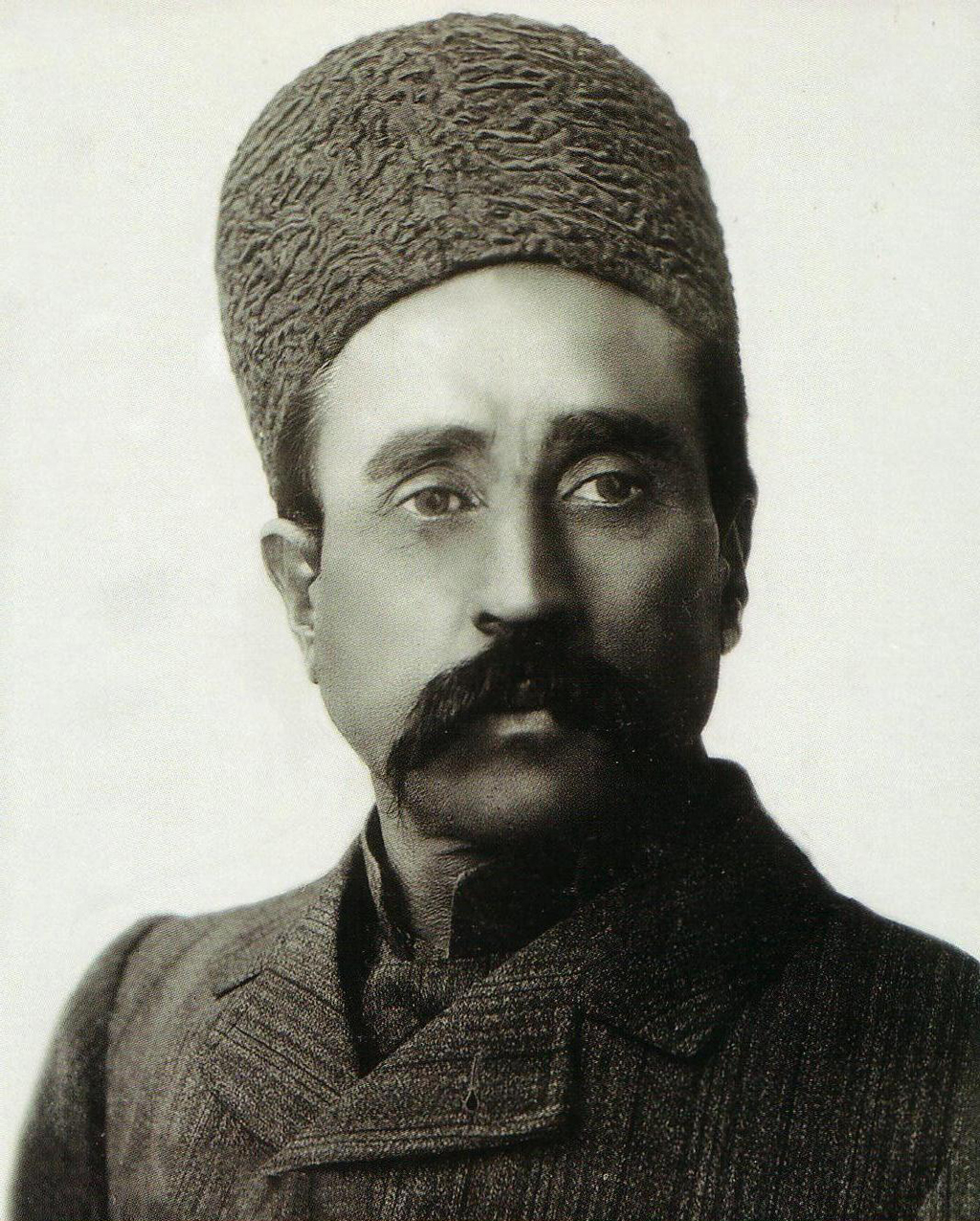
- Born: October 20, 1866; Sardar Kandy, Iran
- Died: November 17, 1914 (aged 48); Tehran, Iran
- Burial place: Shah-Abdol-Azim shrine
- Political party: Moderate Socialists Party
- Spouse: Fatemeh
- Children: Yaadollah, Soltan, Masoumeh, Jalil
- Military career
- Conflicts: Persian Constitutional Revolution; Russian involvement; Russian occupation of Tabriz; Siege of Tabriz (1908–1909); Triumph of Tehran; Atabak Park Incident

Sattar Khan (Persian: ستارخان, IPA: [sættːɒːɾ xɒn], October 20, 1866 – November 17, 1914), honorarily titled Sardār-e Melli (Persian: سردار ملی meaning National Commander) was a pivotal figure in the Iranian Constitutional Revolution and is considered a national hero by the Iranian people.

== Biography ==
=== Early life ===
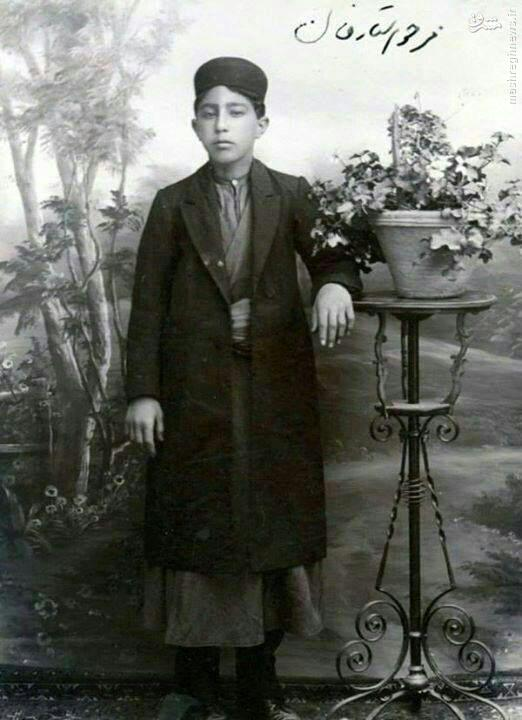
Sattar khan at 16 years old.

Sattar Khan was born in Sardar Kandy, of Iranian Azerbaijani origin, some time in 1868. He was the third son of Haj Hasan Bazzaz, from the Qaradagh. During his childhood, his eldest brother, who had become a highway robber, was executed by the authorities.

The family later moved to Tabriz where Sattar himself came into conflict with the law when he tried to find a hideout for two Caucasian fugitives to whom his father had given shelter. He was incarcerated for two years in Narin Qalʿa, a notorious local prison. Afterwards, he too became a brigand and was subsequently imprisoned again for robberies. He also served in the gendarmerie, controlling the main road between Khoy and Marand, and for a while found employment as part of the armed escort to the crown prince Mozaffar-al-Din Mirza. He was given the title of "khan" (which means "sir" in the Persian language).

Later, after some time in Tehran, he headed an auxiliary troop fighting Turkmen highway robbers near Mashhad.

=== Revolutionary ===
Sattar Khan had close ties to the Social Democratic Party. He rose from obscurity to head Constitutionalist rebels from the Amirkhiz district of Tabriz. By 1907, he had become a favored leader of the rebels. After shelling the Majles (parliament) of Iran in the capital Tehran, 40 thousand of Mohammad Ali Shah's soldiers were ordered to attack Tabriz, where Constitutional rebels were holding out. In June 1908, under the leadership of Sattar Khan, a High Military Council was established. Sattar Khan was appointed the Commander in chief of High Council, Bagher Khan as his deputy, and Ali Musyo, Haji Ali and Seyed Hashem Khan as other notable members.

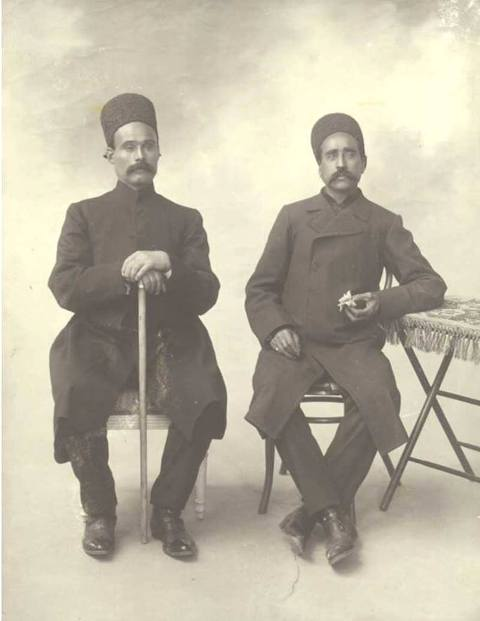
Sattar Khan and Baqer Khan

By April 1909, the Tabriz rebels had lost a large number of their fighters in driving out royalist forces from the city. Taking into account Sattar Khan and Bagher Khan's heroism during the battle, Sattar Khan was honored by the title of "Sardar-e Melli" (سردار ملی, "National General") and Bagir khan "Salar-e Melli" (سالار ملی, "National Leader") by the order of the Assembly.

The early victories of the rebels in Tabriz greatly influenced other Constitutionalists across Iran. Special committees with the name of "Sattar Khan" were established in Tehran, Rasht, Qazvin, Isfahan and other cities. Sattar Khan's reputation also led to the powerful Bakhtiyari tribal leaders to throw in their lot with the Tabriz rebels.

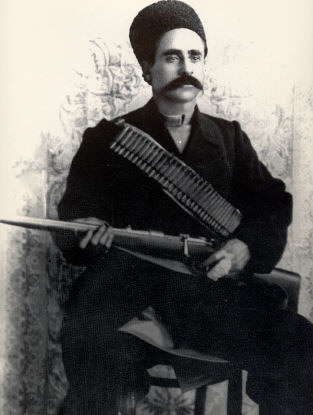
Portrait photograph of Sattar Khan with his rifle.

Most of the cities of Azarbaijan province were cleared of royalist military forces by October 1908. Mohammad Ali Shah Qajar authorized the reopening of the Majles in Tehran in order to try and placate the opposition.

The Second Majles was held in December 1908. It ordered a plaque of honor with images of Sattar Khan and Bagher Khan carved on it in gold as a token of appreciation for their services.

The strengthening of revolutionary power in the wake of the Tabriz victory frightened not only the Qajar Shah but also his allies, Russia and Great Britain. In March 1910, Sattar Khan and Bagher Khan set out for the capital Tehran with 300 pro-Moderate soldiers, where they were greeted by large numbers of supporters April 3, 1910.

Sattar Khan and his warriors camped out in Atabek Park, where they refused to obey the Shah's order to disarm. The Shah's troops and police forces led by Yeprem Khan (Davidyans), head of Tehran police, launched a brief but violent confrontation on the night of August 7, 1910, and succeeded in surrounding and disarming Sattar Khan's forces. About 30 warriors were killed and Sattar Khan was wounded in his leg – remaining disabled until his death at the age 48, on November 9, 1914. He was buried in the famous Shah-Abdol-Azim shrine cemetery in Shahr-e Ray, located just outside of Tehran.

== Legacy ==
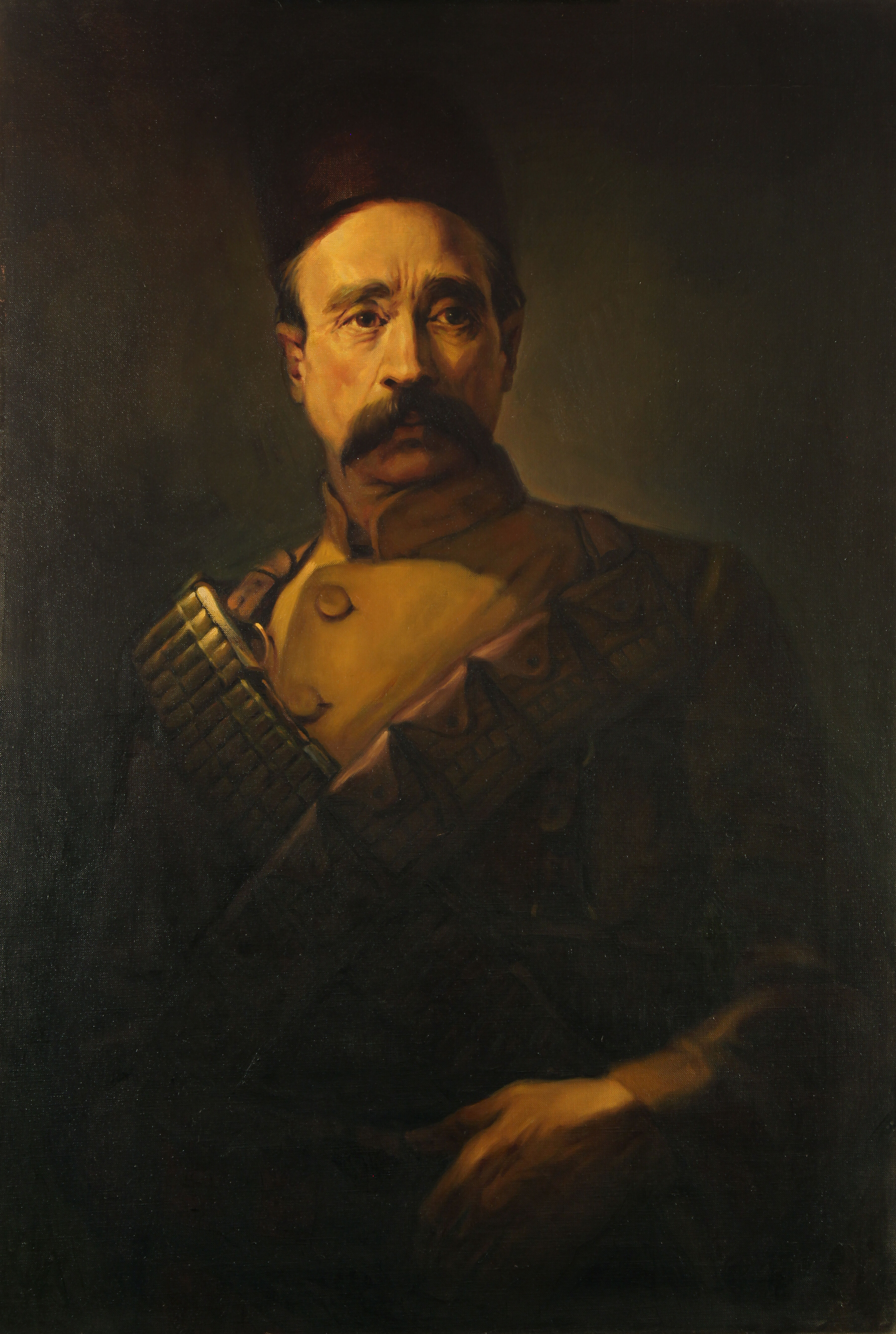
Portrait of Sattar Khan by Ali Mahmudi

Sattar Khan is remembered in Iran as the heroic leader of the Iranian Constitutional Revolution and is the subject of poems and songs.

== See also ==
- Bagher Khan, Sālār-e Melli
- Sattar Khan (film)
- Constitutional Revolution House of Tabriz
