= Gerrus =

Gerrus can refer to:

- Gerrus (province), Iran
- Gerrus (genus), a genus in the bird of paradise family Paradisaeidae
- GER-RUS, the German-Russian Museum Berlin-Karlshorst
