= Southwestern Front =

Southwestern Front may refer to:

- Southwestern Front (Soviet Union), one of the Soviet Fronts in World War II
- Southwestern Front (RSFSR), a front of the Red Army during the Russian Civil War (1918-1920).
- Southwestern Front (Russian Empire), a Front of the Russian Imperial Army in World War I
