= Russian involvement in the Persian Constitutional Revolution =

- Part of Persian Constitutional Revolution
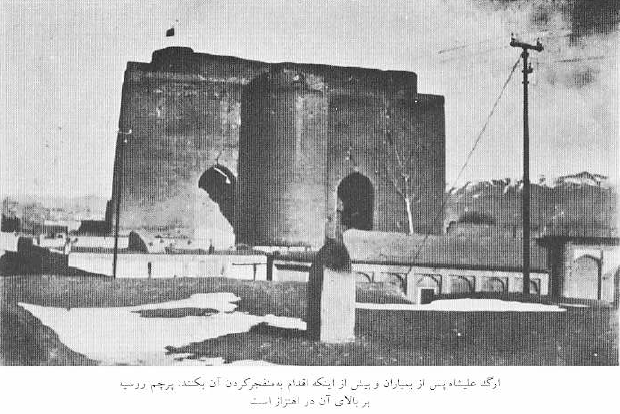
- Russian flag over the gates of Tabriz
Date	1908 – November 23, 1911
Location	Qajar Iran
Result	de facto Russian victory...see § Aftermath section
Territorial changes	Russian occupation of Tabriz and Northern Persia

Belligerents
Russian Empire; Loyalists	Iranian Constitutionalists Supported by: Ottoman Empire; Dashnaks

Commanders and leaders
(Russian Empire) Illarion Vorontsov-Dashkov (Russian Empire) Nikolai Yudenich (Russian Empire) Vladimir Liakhov; Mohammad Ali Shah Qajar	Sattar Khan; Baqir Khan; Yeprem Khan; Sardar Rafie Yanehsari; Heydar Latifiyan

The Russian involvement in the Persian Constitutional Revolution (Russian: Участие Российской империи в Персидской конституционной революции; Persian: مداخله امپراتوری روسیه در انقلاب مشروطه ایران) was to support the authoritarian faction led by Mohammad Ali Shah to defeat the constitutionalists. Until 20 April 1909, when the Russian army under Major General I. Snarsky occupied Tabriz to protect the Russian consuls, the Russian Empire indirectly supported Ali Shah and the authoritarian faction. Support from the Russian Empire included sending weapons, lending money to Colonel Vladimir Liakhov, the commander of the Persian Cossack Brigade, and a large-scale propaganda machine against the constitutionalist leaders.

During the one-year Siege of Tabriz, Russia had repeatedly expressed concern about the security of its consuls. In correspondence between Russian Foreign Minister Alexander Izvolsky and Persian Prime Minister Hossein-Qoli Nezam al-Saltaneh Mafi, the issue of the Russian military invasion of Tabriz and its conquest was repeatedly raised. After that, for two years, the Russian army tried to occupy areas around the Caspian Sea. The Russians conquered the cities of Astara and Bandar Anzali, and even after Ali Shah was deposed, Russian commanders tried to restore his monarchy in a failed campaign. However, Russian influence remained in the Qajar court and bureaucracy, threatening the Ottoman Empire, which led to the Persian campaign in World War I.

== Background ==
Between 1905 and 1911, the Constitutional Revolution took place in Iran. As a result of the protests of the aristocracy, clergy and intellectuals, Mozafereddin Shah was forced to adopt a constitution in October 1906 and create a Majlis. In 1907, the Anglo-Russian Convention concluded with the division of Iran into three spheres of influence: Northern (Russian), Central (neutral and open to Germany), Southern (England). The Constitutional Revolution was a major problem for the convention, so the British and Russian governments agreed to form an authoritarian state and overthrow the constitutionalists.

In January 1907, after the death of his father, Mohammad Ali Shah ascended to the throne. Upon his accession, he promised to abide by the constitution adopted by his father in 1906, which, however, he did not. On 24 June 1908, Ali Shah launched a coup, with the help of the Persian Cossack Brigade, and dispersed the Majlis. Meanwhile, the Russian Empire's first indirect cooperation with Ali Shah sent letters to Colonel Vladimir Liakhov, commander of the Persian Cossack Brigade, to the Russian Embassy in Tehran for a loan and to the Commander-in-Chief of the Caucasus to request troops. In February 1909, the Shahsevan nomads plundered the villages in the vicinity of the city of Ardabil, the residents of which were Russian subjects. The Russian embassy in Iran accused the move and called on the Iranian government to investigate. At the same time, General Nikolai Yudenich crossed the Iranian-Russian border arbitrarily and occupied Ardabil. He said this was to protect the Russian people and suppress tribal insurgents. This was Russia's first serious move in the Constitutional Revolution.

== Occupation of Tabriz, 1909-1911 ==
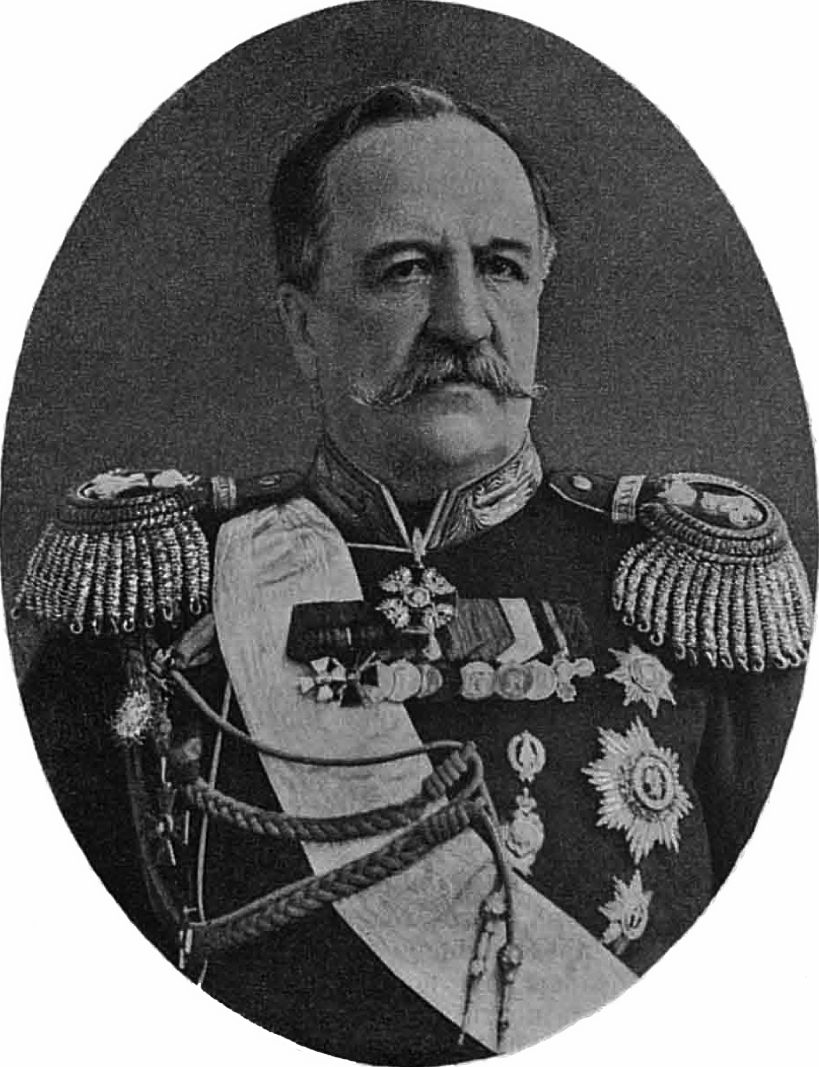
Gen. Vorontsov-Dashkov

On 20 April 1909, after many efforts by both the government and the correspondence of Izvolski and Nezam al-Saltaneh Mafi; a secret directive in No. 1124 was sent to the governor in the Caucasus and the commander of the troops of the Caucasus Military District, Adjutant General Illarion Vorontsov-Dashkov. This was a secret order to occupy Tabriz. The purpose of this occupation was to protect the lives of Russian citizens. However, correspondence remained between Ali Shah and the Russian ambassador to Iran, Stanislav Poklevsky-Kozell, in which Ali Shah requested military intervention from Russia. Soon, two battalions of the 1st Caucasian Rifle Brigade, four hundred cavalry troops of Kuban Cossacks, a sapper company, and three artillery eight-gun batteries were sent to Persia. This detachment was commanded by the head of the 1st Caucasian Rifle Brigade, Major General I. Snarsky. The instructions given to him indicated:

“All communications of the military commanders in the cities occupied by Russian troops with the local Persian authorities and with the population should be carried out through the diplomatic agents of the Russian Imperial Government; joint presence of Russian troops in settlements and movement along the roads protected by Russian troops of any armed detachments and parties whose activities were of a predatory nature is not allowed ... The decision on the use of weapons in business depends solely on the military command ... be enforced irrevocably and with full vigor. "

In Tabriz, on the first day of the Russian offensive, the people of Tabriz defended the city. However, the Russian military forces were able to inflict heavy casualties on the inhabitants of the city due to the lack of military experience and the lack of leadership of the Tabriz defenders. Fighting resumed on the next day until the evening when both sides agreed to a ceasefire. Despite suffering heavy casualties, the defenders of Tabriz maintained their positions within the city. At this time, the Russians cut off the connection of Tabriz's telegraph lines. On the third day of the battle, Russian reinforcements arrived and the defenders were defeated resulting in Tabriz being occupied by the Russians who took revenge on the city's defenders and libertarians. A large number of people in the city were killed by the Russians and their agents.

Although the government of Ahmad Moshir al-Saltaneh, the new Persian prime minister accused the Russians, Ali Shah invited General Vorontsov-Dashkov to Tehran a few days later to present him Order of the Lion and the Sun. However, the ceremony was dropped due to strong opposition from al-Saltaneh and multiple princes. At this time, Sattar Khan and Baqir Khan, with the help of the constitutionalists, took refuge in the Ottoman consulate in Tabriz. With the exception of the defenders of the city, who were purged by the authoritarians and later by Russian forces, most Kurdish tribal forces exerted pressure on the Russians. The Kurds only attacked Russian convoys to prevent them from delivering food to Russian troops and helped some constitutionalist leaders secretly escape from Tabriz. They killed Russian soldiers and wrote patriotic slogans on their bodies. The situation proved difficult for the Russians which prompted Major General Snarsky to write a letter to Adjutant General Vorontsov-Dashkov requesting full authority to defeat and eliminate all the invading Kurds which the latter granted. The Russian forces set up a large propaganda organization that called the Kurds bandits and constantly punished the prisoners in public so that the Tabriz constitutionalists would not be encouraged to resist.

== Ultimatum and Invasion of Iran ==
On 16 July 1909, Ali Shah was deposed by the constitutionalists after the Triumph of Tehran. He sought refuge in the Russian embassy and later fled to Russia. The Russian Empire at this time was still occupying Tabriz and refused to withdraw. On 21 November 1911, about 17 days after the extension of the Second National Assembly, which had been closed in 1908 due to bombardment from Colonel Liakhov, the Russian government issued a stern ultimatum to Iran:

1. Immediately fire Morgan Shuster .
2. Do not hire any advisor from any government without the consent of Russia and Britain.
3. Pay the expenses of the Russian army to Tabriz.

Iran was given 48 hours to provide a satisfactory response otherwise the Russians would attack.

Abolqasem Naser ol-Molk, Regent of Ahmad Shah, dissolved parliament and agreed to the ultimatum. Regardless, the Russian army invaded Iran. The introduction of troops was carried out in three operational directions - from Julfa, Astara and Anzeli - to Tehran. The immediate operational command of the Russian troops in Persia was carried out by the quartermaster general of the headquarters of the Caucasian Military District, Major General Nikolai Yudenich. The contingent of Russian troops included: the 14th Georgian and 16th Mingrelian grenadier regiments of the Caucasian Grenadier Division, regiments from the 21st, 39th and 52nd infantry divisions (81st Apsheron, 84th Shirvan, 156th Elizavetpolsky, 205th Shemakhinsky, 206th Salyansky and 207th Novobayazetsky) with artillery and machine guns. The transportation of troops by sea, their landing in the port of Anzali and its fire cover was carried out by the Caspian military flotilla. Communication support was provided by the 2nd Caucasian Railway Battalion and the Caucasian Automobile Team. The railway battalion began construction of the Julfa-Tehran railway line. The arrangement of the temporary headquarters was carried out by the 1st Caucasian Sapper Battalion. Communication was provided by the Caucasian spark company. Meanwhile, Armenian Dashnaks, led by Yeprem Khan, fought alongside the Persians against the Russians along all lines. Some of Yeprem Khan's best men, such as Petros Khan Melik Anderasian, were executed by the Russians.

=== Violence in Mashhad ===
When the people of Mashhad learned of the ultimatum, they staged a major uprising against Russia and its interventionist measures. Markets and schools were closed and the city was shut down. People marched in the streets and markets with flags and banners with demonstrations taking place against the Russians. A large group of people congregated at the Goharshad Mosque in opposition to the Russians. One of the city's famous preachers went to the pulpit at sunset and read the ultimatum to the people. In addition, journalists, including Mirzadeh Eshghi, sent a telegram to the Khorasan Provincial Council ordering a boycott of Russian goods. Several cloth sellers symbolically tore their Russian linen cloths and burned them. Sugar, tea, and Russian linen fabrics were banned by the people of Mashhad.

The growing opposition and rallies against the Russians worried the Russian consul who requested for help from the Russian government in establishing control over the city and suppressing the popular protests. The Russian government complied and fully-equipped Russian forces entered Mashhad with artillery. Although the Russians occupied Mashhad extensively, they needed a strong pretext for serious action against the militants and the constitutionalists. Khorasan province, especially Mashhad, had many problems during the Constitutional Revolution, including economic, political and security problems. Roads were very unsafe, offices were very disorganized, and the general situation was chaotic; the fledgling government could not solve such problems. Faced with these issues, Russia, which itself played a role in creating such a situation, considered taking advantage of the turbulence in Khorasan and fueled a rift between the constitutionalist faction and loyalists to Ali Shah (former authoritarians) of the city. The Russians then strengthened the authoritarian faction and supported a number of anti-constitutional rebels. The incitement of the constitutional opposition, and the support of the Russians for them, caused a riot in Mashhad and provided the Russians with their long-awaited necessary excuse for military intervention.

Among the authoritarians in Mashhad who fought against the constitutionalists of that city was Nayeb Ali Akbar Noghani, who had established an anti-constitutional center in the Noghan neighborhood by setting up a tent. The people of Noghan neighborhood, who opposed his anti-reform measures, tried to kill him. Naib Ali Akbar, when he learned of the people's intentions, fled Noghan at night and took refuge in the Arg neighborhood of Mashhad, which was supported by government soldiers, and continued his activities against the constitutionalists in this neighborhood. In order to weaken the constitutional centers in Mashhad and strengthen the opponents of the constitution, the Russians, by gathering insurgents and opponents of the constitution, launched a large-scale anti-constitutional uprising in this city. Akbar Boland Tehrani, Yousef Khan Herati, Talib al-Haq Yazdi, and Mohammad Qurayshabadi were among the insurgents who were affiliated with the Russians. In 1911, with the help of the Russians, a group of opponents of the constitution gathered in Mashhad and revolted against the constitution. Dabizha, the Russian consul, set up an operations center headed by Talib al-Haq. Akbar Boland Tehrani and Yousef Herati were also prominent members of this group. The gathering place of this group was a small and old house near Goharshad Mosque. Their intention was to incite the people of Mashhad against the national government, and in support of the former Shah, and then they wanted to bring Mohammad Ali Mirza to Mashhad via Astarabad and return him to the throne with the help of the Russians.

The insurgents set up their base of struggle, Imam Reza Shrine, and eventually conquered it. The Russians, who were the main cause of the unrest in Mashhad, on the one hand encouraged the insurgents to continue the unrest and on the other hand threatened the people of the city with shelling the shrine if the insurgents did not surrender. As the rebels remained in the shrine, the Russians reached their destination and began their bombardment. After two hours of shelling, at sunset, the Russian army attacked the shrine. The Russians continued firing their cannons, damaging the shrine and inflicting casualties on those inside, until midnight. On 30 March 1912, valuables which were looted were transferred directly to the Bank of Russia, while the shrine remained under occupation. In this uprising, 1,500 ordinary people were arrested or killed, but there were no recorded casualties among the insurgents.

=== Gomishan Campaign ===
Mohammad Ali Shah was deposed on 15 July 1909 and stayed at the Russian Embassy in Tehran for 53 days before settling in Odessa. In 1911, at the same time as the authoritarian uprising in Mashhad, he entered Iran with his two brothers, Malek Mansur Mirza Shoa O-Saltaneh and Abolfath Mirza Salar al-Dawlah, and encamped at Gomsh Tappeh (Gomishan). Shoa O-Saltaneh took the road to Mazandaran and camped in Babol to gather an army. Salar al-Dawlah went to Kurdistan, where he raised another army and marched on Gerrus. The local Khans of Mazandaran and Astarabad quickly joined Ali Shah. The parliament was in crisis, they quickly set a reward for the arrest of Ali Shah, at the same time many members of parliament took refuge in the British embassy to avoid being killed.

At this time, the Russians pressed on with their conquest of Mashhad and Neishabour, supplying weapons to Ali Shah and his men. To restore the rule of his brother, Salar al-Dawlah with an army from the tribes of Kalhor, Jaf, Sanjabi and Lur, was able to capture Kermanshah and Hamedan. In the first battle with the constitutionalists, under the command of Amir Mufakhm Bakhtiari, which took place near Malayer, Salar al-Dawlah defeated the constitutionalists. He then left for Tehran with about 30,000 troops. In the second battle, which was commanded by Amir Mufakhm and Salar al-Dawla's army near Saveh, this time Salar al-Dawla was severely defeated and he escaped from the battlefield. Because the parliament set a reward of 25,000 tomans for his arrest or execution, Salar al-Dawla fled to the Ottoman Empire. And from there he went to Alexandria and stayed there for the rest of his life. Shoa O-Saltaneh conquered Babol by killing ten government forces and capturing seventy of them. He then went to Sari with his 13,000 army, but was defeated by Yeprem Khan's army nearby, so he fled east to join Ali Shah. Finally, in Babol, Yeprem Khan's forces including armed militias defeated and arrested him. He was taken to Tehran where he died in 1922.

Mohammad Ali Shah divided his forces into three groups: he sent one group to Shahroud under the command of Ali Khan Arshad al-Dawla, who advanced to Varamin only to be defeated by government troops with Arshad al-Dawla himself being shot. Another group went by the sea and its commanders were Mirza Mohammad Khan Amir Makram Larijani and Askar Khan Azam-ol-Molk who were defeated by Yeprem Khan and his Dashnaks. The middle army, in which Mohammad Ali Mirza himself participated, went to Astarabad via Mazandaran. Apart from Habibullah Khan Sartip, among the officials who were in this army are Amir Moayed Savadkuhi, Morad Khan Savadkuhi, Habibullah Khan Shoja Al-Molk Surtiji, Habibullah Khan Salar Azam Do Mehri and several others. In the meantime, Sardar Rafie Yanehsari, realizing the danger of Ali Shah, marched towards them with his army. The two armies fought in Savadkuh, and the crisis ended with the defeat of Ali Shah and his return to Russia. Sardar Rafi later fought with the Russian army many times during the Persian Campaign.

== Aftermath ==
The defeat of Mohammad Ali Shah meant that the position of the authoritarians in Iran had weakened and it was no longer possible to return to that government before the Constitutional Revolution. Shortly afterwards, the Russian army stopped advancing and retreated to Tabriz. The Russians tried to maintain their influence in the Qajar bureaucracy. Many princes and politicians took bribes to support Russia's goals in Iran. On the other hand, this worried the Ottoman Empire, which now sought more influence in Iran because it sought refuge with the constitutionalists during the Constitutional Revolution. By 1913, the country was almost completely calm due to the presence of Russian troops. In general, the Russians were able to defeat the opposing groups militarily and ensure relative calm in the region for the functioning of trade routes, which the Tsarist government was in need of. The conflict between the Russian Empire and the Ottoman Empire over Iran led to the invasion of Iran in 1915 and the beginning of the Persian campaign during the First World War.
