= Southwestern Front (RSFSR) =

The Southwestern Front (Russian: Юго-Западный фронт) was a front of the Red Army during the Russian Civil War and the Polish-Soviet War, which existed between January 10, 1920, and December 5, 1920. Before January 1920, it was named the Southern Front.

== Operations ==
In January–February 1920, the Front forces, pursuing the retreating White forces of Denikin, successfully conducted the Odessa operation and occupied Odessa on February 7. By March 1 the Front reached the line Mozyr-Ovruch-Korosten-Letichev-Dniester River, but attempts to seize the Crimea, defended by the White Army under the command of General Yakov Slashchov, ended unsuccessfully.

Then the Front troops acted on two strategic directions : the Western against Poland, and the Crimean against the Army of Wrangel. In April-May 1920, countering the advancing Polish troops, they left Mozyr, Ovruch, Korosten, Kiev and moved to the left bank of the Dnieper. In May and June, they launched a counteroffensive and successfully conducted the Kiev operation, after which they continued their pursuit of the enemy in the zone from Polesia to the Dniester. in June-July, during the Novohrad-Volynskyi and Rivne operations, the Front troops defeated the Polish and reached the approaches to Lublin and Lviv, but they could not seize Lviv and in August 1920 they were forced to retreat.

The troops of the Front also fought the armed detachments of Bulak-Balakhovich, Petlyura and Boris Savinkov. On October 18, after the conclusion of the Truce with Poland, the Front's operations were stopped and the troops withdrew behind the state border.

On the Crimean front, in June–July, under the pressure of Wrangel's army the Front forces withdrew to the right bank of the Dnieper and conducted defensive battles on the Kherson-Nikopol-Tokmak-Berdyansk line. In August, they launched an offensive and occupied the Kakhovka bridgehead.
In September, the enemy succeeded in pushing back the troops of the left wing of the 13th Army, and in occupying Alexandrovsk, Orekhov and Sinelnikovo, creating a threat to the Donbas Region. In September 1920, the Crimean section of the South-Western Front was separated into an independent Southern Front (2nd formation).

The Front was disbanded on December 5, 1920, and the Front Administration merged with the Administration of the Kiev Military District, to which all the front troops became subordinated.

== Composition ==
- 12th Army (10.01.1920 - 13.08.1920 and 27.09.1920 - 25.12.1920),
- 13th Army (10.01.1920 - 21.09.1920),
- 14th Army (10.01.1920 - 31.12.1920),
- 1st Cavalry Army (01.04.1920 - 14.08.1920),
- 2nd Cavalry Army (16.07.1920 - 25.09.1920),
- 6th Army (08.09.1920 - 26.09.1920),
- Ukrainian Labor Army (30.01.1920 - 25.09.1920),
- Gomel Fortified Region (25.02.1920 - 17.03.1920),
- Fastov Group (Iona Yakir) (19.05.1920 - 13.06.1920)

== Commanders ==
Commander :

- Alexander Yegorov

Chief of Staff :

- Nikolai Petin

Members of the Revolutionary Military Council:

- Joseph Stalin
- Reingold Berzin
- Leonid Serebryakov
- Miron Vladimirov
- Christian Rakovsky
- Sergey Ivanovich Gusev
- Semyon Aralov
