= Baqir Khan =

Iranian revolutionary (1870–1916)

Bagher Khan
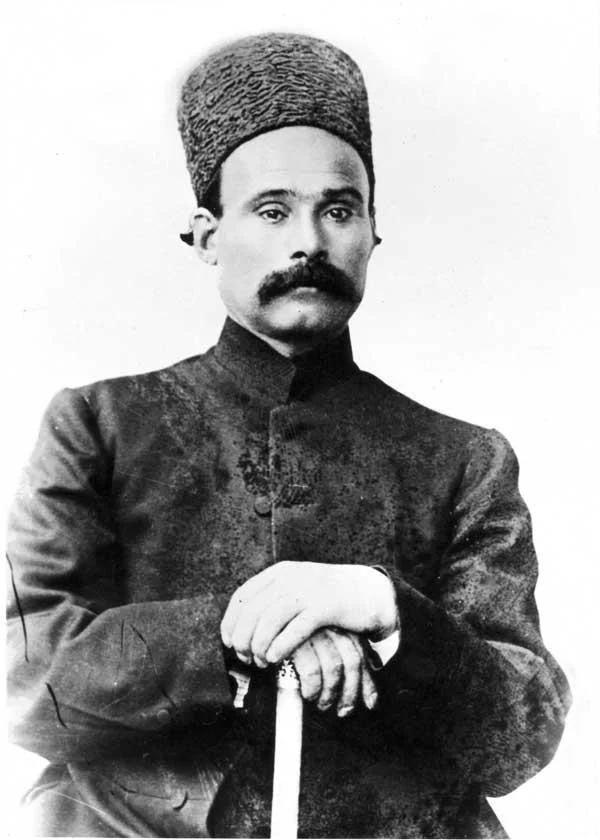
- Born: c. 1870; Tabriz, Sublime State of Persia
- Died: November 1916 (aged 55); Qasr-e Shirin, Persia
- Political party: Moderate Socialists Party
- Military career
- Conflicts: Persian Constitutional Revolution; Russian involvement; Russian occupation of Tabriz; Siege of Tabriz (1908–1909); Triumph of Tehran

Bagher Khān (Persian: باقرخان; c. 1870 – November 1916) honorarily titled Sālār-e Melli (سالار ملی "National Chieftain") or Baqir Khān, was one of the key figures in the Iranian Constitutional Revolution.

== Biography ==
=== Early life ===
Bagher Khan was born in Tabriz, Iran in the 1870s and was the son of Haj Reza Bana. Bagher Khan was a bricklayer by profession. Soon he emerged in the streets of Tabriz as a lūṭī of the east end of the city. He came from an orthodox background. But with an inclination to the pro-Constitution leaders, he joined the ranks of the revolutionary militia by 1907. He was of Iranian Azeri origin.

=== Revolutionary ===
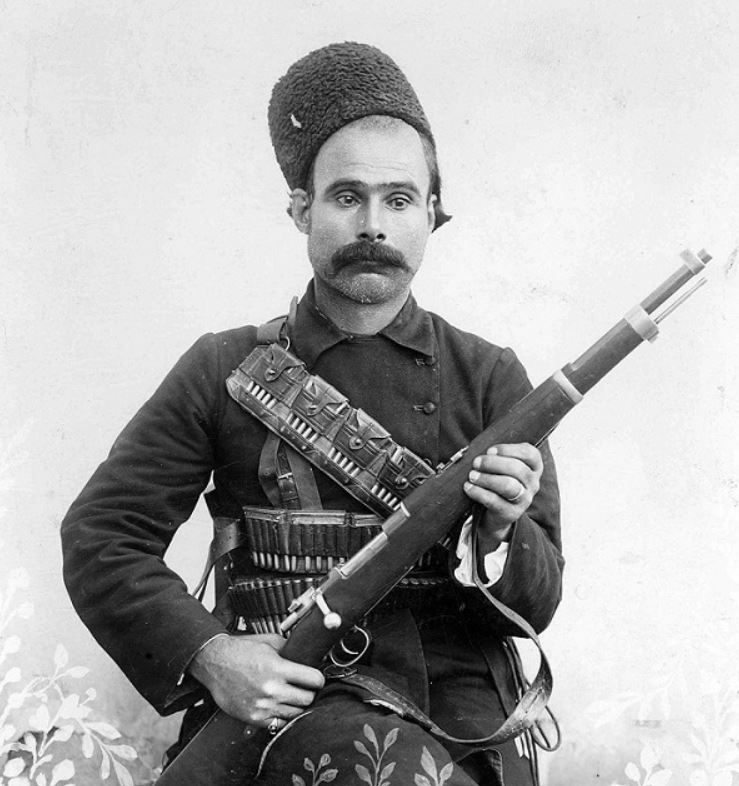
Bagher Khan during the Revolution

Bagher Khan played a key role in the Iranian Constitutional Revolution. He joined the Revolutionary Militia in 1907 and was active in several clashes in Tabriz. After the 1908 bombardment of the Majlis, Bagher Khan along with Sattar Khan marched towards Tehran, however he returned to Tabriz shortly after upon hearing that the city was under attack. On 22 March 1909, Bagher Khan led the Revolutionary Militia to victory in the Battle of Saridag in which the supply routes to Tabriz were opened.

In 1910, Bagher Khan was effectively exiled to Tehran. In 1915, he joined the Committee for National Defence and participated in skirmishes with Russian forces before being forced to retreat to Kermanshah.

=== Death ===
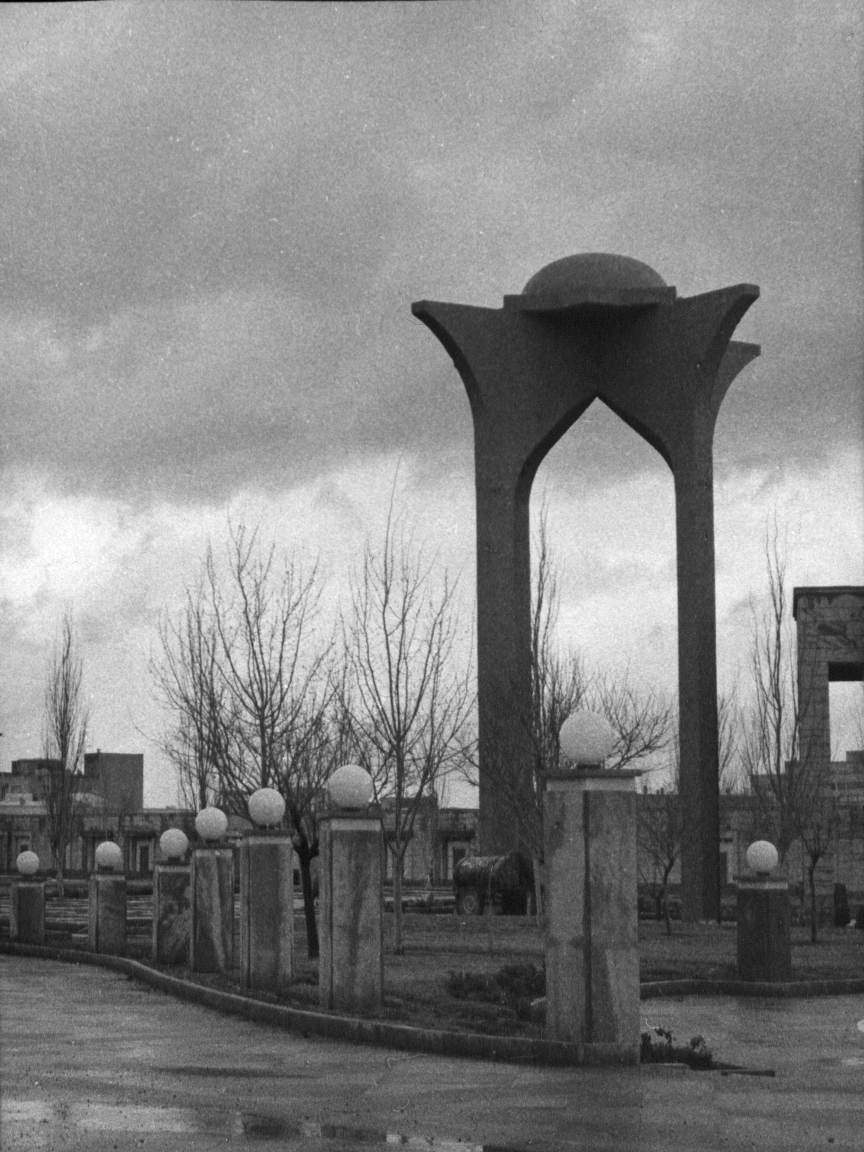
Tomb of Bāqer Khān in Toobaeyye cemetery, Tabriz

In November 1916, while wandering near Qasr-e Shirin, he was offered accommodation by Mohammad Amin Talebani. On the same night, Talebani murdered Bagher Khan and his companions, and threw their bodies away nearby.

== See also ==
- Constitutional Revolution House of Tabriz

== Sources ==
- Amanat, A. (1988). "Bāqer Khan, Sālār-e Melli". Encyclopaedia Iranica, Vol. III, Fasc. 7. pp. 726–728.
