= Vladimir Liakhov =

Russian Cossack (1869–1920)

- Влади́мир Ля́хов

Commander of the Persian Cossack Brigade
- In office 1906–1909
- Monarch: Mohammad Ali Shah Qajar

Personal details
- Born: Vladimir Platonovitch Liakhov; 1869
- Died: 1919, (aged 50)

Military service
- Allegiance: Russian Empire; White Movement
- Rank: Lieutenant General
- Battles/wars: Persian Constitutional Revolution; Russian involvement; 1908 bombardment of the Majlis; World War I; Caucasus campaign; Trebizond Campaign; Battle of Erzincan; Russian Civil War X

Vladimir Platonovitch Liakhov (also spelled Liakhoff; Russian: Влади́мир Плато́нович Ля́хов; c. 20 June 1869 – June 1919) was the commander of the Persian Cossack Brigade during the rule of Mohammad Ali Shah Qajar (r. 1907-1909). He gained considerable notoriety after shelling the Majlis of Iran and execution of several constitutionalist leaders on June 23, 1908. As a sign of gratitude, Mohammad Ali Shah appointed him as the Military Governor of Tehran.

Liakhoff and his forces subsequently served the Shah until July 1909. Upon the Shah's abdication and escape to Russia, Liakhov surrendered the Persian Cossack Brigade. However, Liakhov was pardoned by the constitutionalist leaders, speculated to be for fear of Russian retribution, and was sent back to Saint Petersburg.

He then served on the Caucasian Front during World War I. In 1916, Lyakhov's troops captured Trabzon in the Trebizond Campaign. After the Russian Revolution, Lyakhov joined the White movement, serving in General Anton Denikin's Volunteer Army. In October 1918, he led the attack against the Vladikavkaz Railway. From November 15, 1918, he was the commander of the III Army Corps of the Volunteer Army. After the occupation of the Terek on January 10, 1919, he was appointed commander-in-chief of the troops in the Terek-Dagestan Territory. After April 1919, he was moved in the reserve of the Volunteer Army, retired from military service and settled in the suburb of Batumi. There, he was killed by intruders in unclear circumstances.
