= 3rd Army Corps (Armed Forces of South Russia) =

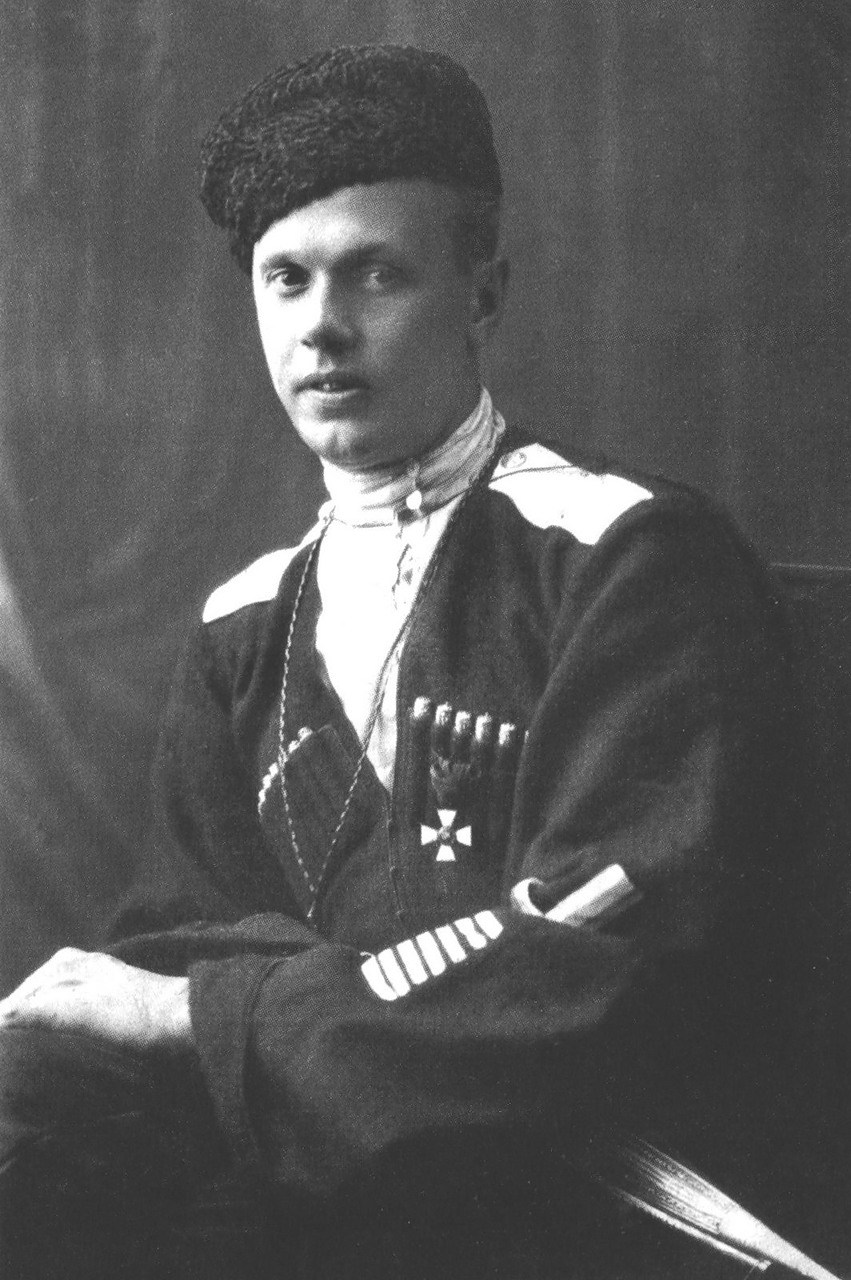
- Yakov Aleksandrovich Slashchov
- Country: Russia
- Allegiance: (Russian Empire) White Movement
- Branch: Armed Forces of South Russia
- Size: Corps
- Engagements: Russian Civil War; Southern Front

The 3rd Army Corps (Russian: 3-й армейский корпус) was one of the main formations of the Armed Forces of South Russia (Russian: Вооружённых Сил Юга России, ВСЮР; VSUR) during the Russian Civil War.

This army unit was first known as the Crimean-Azov Army formed in VSYUR on January 10, 1919, on the basis of the Crimean-Azov Corps itself formed in December 1918.
In May 1919 the Crimean-Azov Army was transformed into the 3rd Army Corps.

== 1st Formation ==
The 3rd Army Corps was first formed on November 15, 1918. It included the 2nd Kuban Plastun Brigade, a Plastun Brigade of Colonel Y.A. Slashchev and the 1st Caucasian Cossack Division. It was then disbanded on January 10, 1919.

== 2nd Formation ==
The 3rd Army Corps was reformed from the Crimean-Azov Army on May 22, 1919. It included the 4th Infantry Division and the Independent Cavalry Brigade. Furthermore, the troops were further divided into the 13th and 34th Infantry Divisions and the Slavic and Caucasian Rifle Regiments and deployed into the Army of Novorossiysk. After the defeat of the Armed Forces of Southern Russia along its front these troops retreat to Crimea and became the Crimean Corps.

== 3rd Formation ==
The 3rd Corps was reformed for a final time in the Russian Army on September 4, 1920. It was part of the 2nd Army. It was Composed of the 6th and 7th Infantry Divisions and a Separate Battalion of German Colonists. After Wrangle's Taurida Offensive was defeated, the Corps retreated for the last time to Crimea and was disbanded and the units dispersed to other formations with the 6th going to the 2nd Corps, while the 7th going to the Kuban Corps.

== Commanders ==
- Vladimir Liakhov 1918–1919 (1st formation)
- Sergey Dobrorol'skij (28.05.1919 – 10 July 1919) (2nd formation)
- Nikolai Shilling (10.7.1919 – 26.08.1919)
- Yakov Slashchov (06.12.1919 – 04.09.1920)

== Chiefs of Staff ==
- E. V. Maslovskiy: 1918–1919 (1st formation)
