= Odessa Operation (1919) =

Military operation

Coordinates: 46°29′8.6″N 30°44′36.4″E

- Part of Russian Civil War
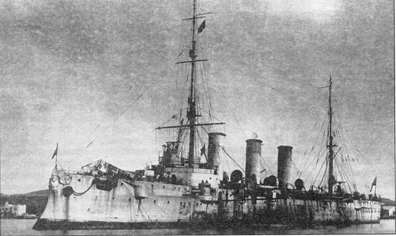
- Russian Cruiser Ochakov.
Date	August 20 – 24, 1919
Location	South-Western Ukraine
Result	White Army victory

Belligerents
Russian Soviet Federative Socialist Republic	Armed Forces of South Russia

Commanders and leaders
(Russian Soviet Federative Socialist Republic) Iona Yakir; (Russian Soviet Federative Socialist Republic) Boris Krajewski	(Russian Empire) Nikolai Shilling; (Russian Empire) Colonel A.P. Sablin

Units involved
45th Division; 47th Division; Odessa Garrison	Armed Forces of South Russia

Casualties and losses
Unknown	Unknown

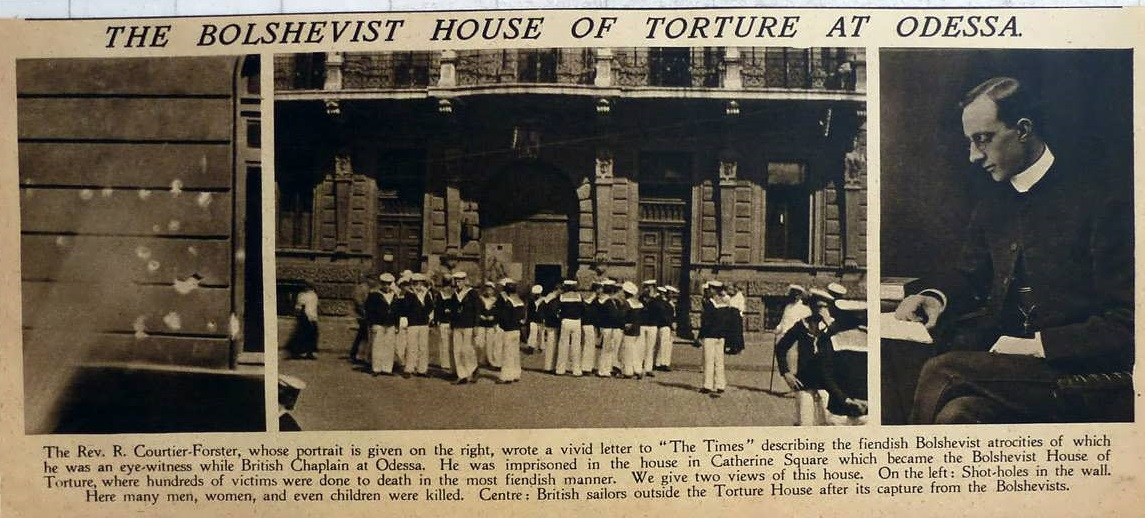
British sailors in Odessa after the conquest of the city, August 1919.

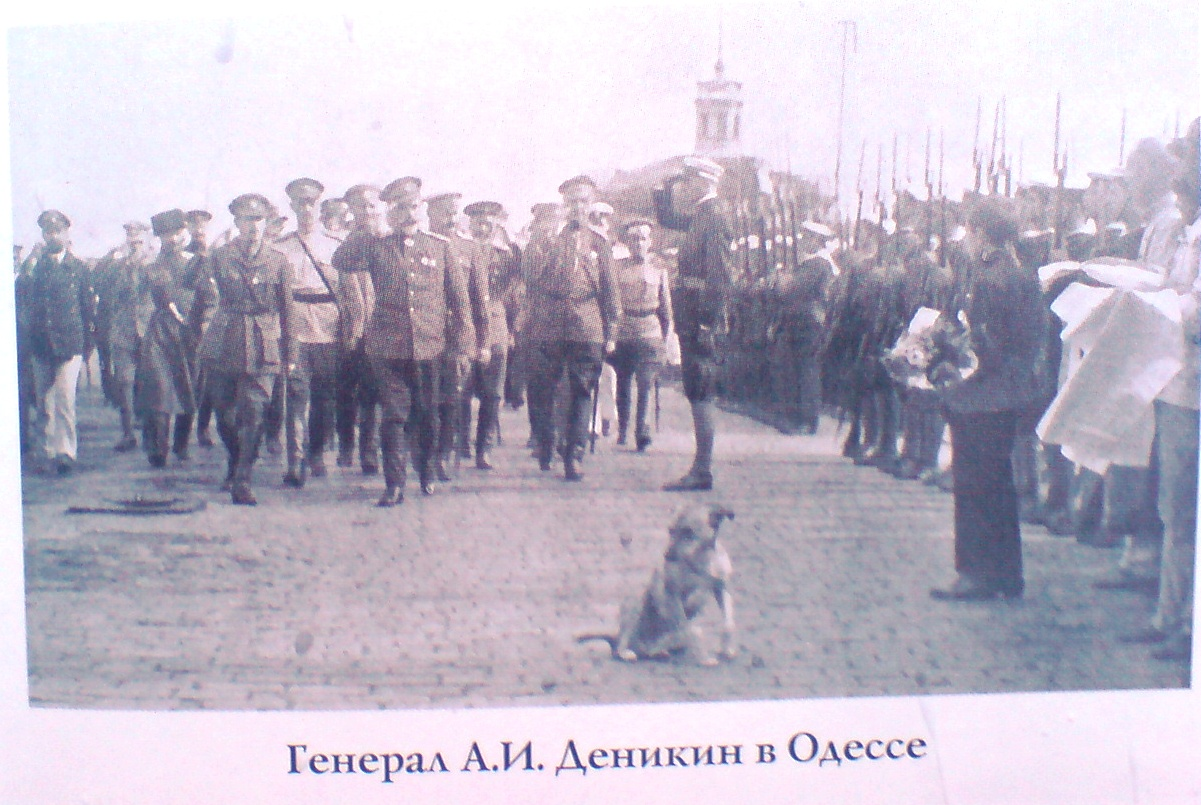
General Denikin in Odessa, September 1919.

The Odessa operation (1919) or the Odessa landing was a successful amphibious military operation by the White Armed Forces of South Russia against the troops of the Red Army and the Odessa garrison on 20–24 August 1919. The success of the operation would have been impossible without a coordinated anti-Bolshevik insurrection in the city itself.
The operation was carried out in the development of the "Moscow directive" of the AFSR (paragraph 6).

== Prelude ==
Between December 1918 and April 1919, French and Greek troops had taken over control of Odessa during the Southern Russia Intervention. On April 7 1919, they evacuated the city when the pro-Bolshevik Army of Otaman Nykyfor Hryhoriv approached. In May a Red Defence Committee of the Odessa Military District was established under command of Boris Krajewski, Ivan Klimenko and Yan Gamarnik. They had 2 divisions at their disposal, the 45th and 47th, and a garrison of some 5,000 untrained men.

The position of Odessa, as the most south-western point of Soviet power, was vulnerable. From the sea it was blocked by the naval forces of the Entente. From land at any time, the Petliurists, Whites or Makhnovists and insurgent peasants of suburban villages could cut it off from the center. Red Odessa of that time, in the words of Comrade Ivan Klimenko, one of the leaders of the Defence Committee of the city, lived all the time in a condition of evacuation.

On July 18, the White Army took Nikolaev (now Mykolaiv), what created an immediate threat to Odessa. In late July and early August, typhus and cholera epidemics began to develop in the city, which became extremely acute. By August 10, 1,130 cases of cholera were registered, the death rate among the diseased was 47%. The situation was aggravated by a severe sanitary and hygienic situation by an acute lack of clean water.

Furthermore, at the end of July 1919 a powerful peasant uprising flared up in the villages around Odessa, the cause of which was the mobilization into the Red Army of the entire male population between 18 and 45. The leaders of the insurgents contacted the command of the White Volunteer Army (approximately July 30 – August 1), asking for help. Wishing to take advantage of the moment, the command of the AFSR, which had retaken the Crimea (Crimean Socialist Soviet Republic) in June 1919, planned to conduct an amphibious operation from there as soon as possible, hoping to rely on the forces of the insurgents.

The fleet of the AFSR was centered around the cruiser Ochakov and commanded by captain 1st rank Pavel Osteletsky. On August 22, at noon, a squadron of the Royal Navy of Great Britain, including light cruiser HMS Caradoc, joined the AFSR squadron.

In the city a White Guard underground organisation had been created under command of A.P. Sablin. It was divided into dozens of units, each of which was assigned to a separate sector of the city. The commander of the Red "Black Sea Fleet", A. Sheykovsky, also became a supporter of the Volunteers and managed to equip the coastal batteries in the Odessa region with sympathisers. As a result, the batteries later went over to the Whites without firing a single shot.

However, the initial plans of the AFSR command – to conduct joint actions with the rebel peasants – did not come true. Having gathered all the forces at its disposal, the “Defence Committee” managed to crush the uprising, “drowning it in blood”. Moreover, the Odessa Checka managed to get on the trail of the White underground organization in the city and on the eve of the landing of troops to arrest their leaders – Colonel Sablin, lieutenants Markov, Chelakaev and Nakashidze. Despite these circumstances, the landing went ahead.

== The landing operation and uprising ==
Early in the morning of August 23, the landing force, under command of Nikolai Shilling, disembarked near Chornomorsk, south of Odessa. The landing went smoothly and was not detected by the Soviet troops. The White landing forces advanced in 6 columns towards the city. The first Red battery it encountered immediately went over to the side of the Whites.

After learning about the landing, all the highest Red commanders, Yan Gamarnik, Boris Krajewski and Iona Yakir, fled the city by noon. Due to the flight of the entire command, there was no one left to organise the defence or evacuation of the city, which led to the fact that many Soviet soldiers fell into the hands of the rebels.

By 15 o'clock information had been received that Red forces were concentrating in the area of the Artillery school, some 600 men with six howitzers and one armored car. This information was transmitted to the Russian and British squadron. The Russian cruiser Ochakov and HMS Caradoc immediately opened fire and achieved a number of successful hits, which led to panic amongst the Soviet unit, which scattered in all directions.

At about 17 o'clock at the intersection of the road from Moldavanka to Arcadia with the tram line, a new concentration of Red forces (415th and 416th regiments) was observed, some 800 men preparing for an attack on the landing party. But soon it was also scattered by accurate artillery fire from the ships. At 17h30, the forward detachment resumed its advance towards Odessa and reached the railway lines that bend around the city and, in view of the coming darkness, stopped for the night.

Meanwhile, according to the agreement with the White underground, the heavy battery in Arcadia, which had gone over to the AFSR, fired three shots in the direction of Odessa, which was the signal for the beginning of the uprising. Immediately throughout the city, the rebels seized buildings and freed the 4 imprisoned leaders of the uprising. The rebels chased the Red units from the port area and began to move along the Marazlievskaya and Kanatnaya streets towards the railway station, clearing Red quarter after quarter. There was no particular resistance anywhere. By 2300 hours, the entire eastern part of the city from the seashore to Pushkinska Street (the area where the prosperous classes lived) was under the control of the rebels, who continued to clear the city of the Reds, moving into the working class areas – Moldavanka, Slobodka, Peresyp.

By 8 am on August 24, the whole city was under the control of the insurgent White Guards. Colonel Sablin declared himself the "Commander of the forces of Odessa."

== Aftermath ==
Having lost Odessa, the Bolsheviks were forced to leave the entire southwest of the Ukrainian SSR. After the occupation of Odessa by the AFSR, it became possible to document the atrocities of the Red terror. A Special Investigation Commission was created to investigate the atrocities of the Bolsheviks, and gathered in Odessa numerous evidences of the crimes of the Bolshevik regime against its own people.

Odessa remained under White control until February 8, 1920, when it was retaken by the Red Army in the Odessa operation (1920).

== See also ==
- Bibliography of the Russian Revolution and Civil War
- Outline of the Russian Revolution and Civil War
- Index of articles related to the Russian Revolution and Civil War
- The "Russian" Civil Wars, 1916–1926: Ten Years That Shook the World
- Russia in Flames: War, Revolution, Civil War, 1914–1921
- Russia in Revolution: An Empire in Crisis, 1890 to 1928
- Russia: Revolution and Civil War, 1917—1921
- The Russian Revolution: A New History
