= 1908 bombardment of the Majlis =

1908 attack in Tehran

Bombardment of the Majlis
- Part of Persian Constitutional Revolution and Russian involvement in the Persian Constitutional Revolution
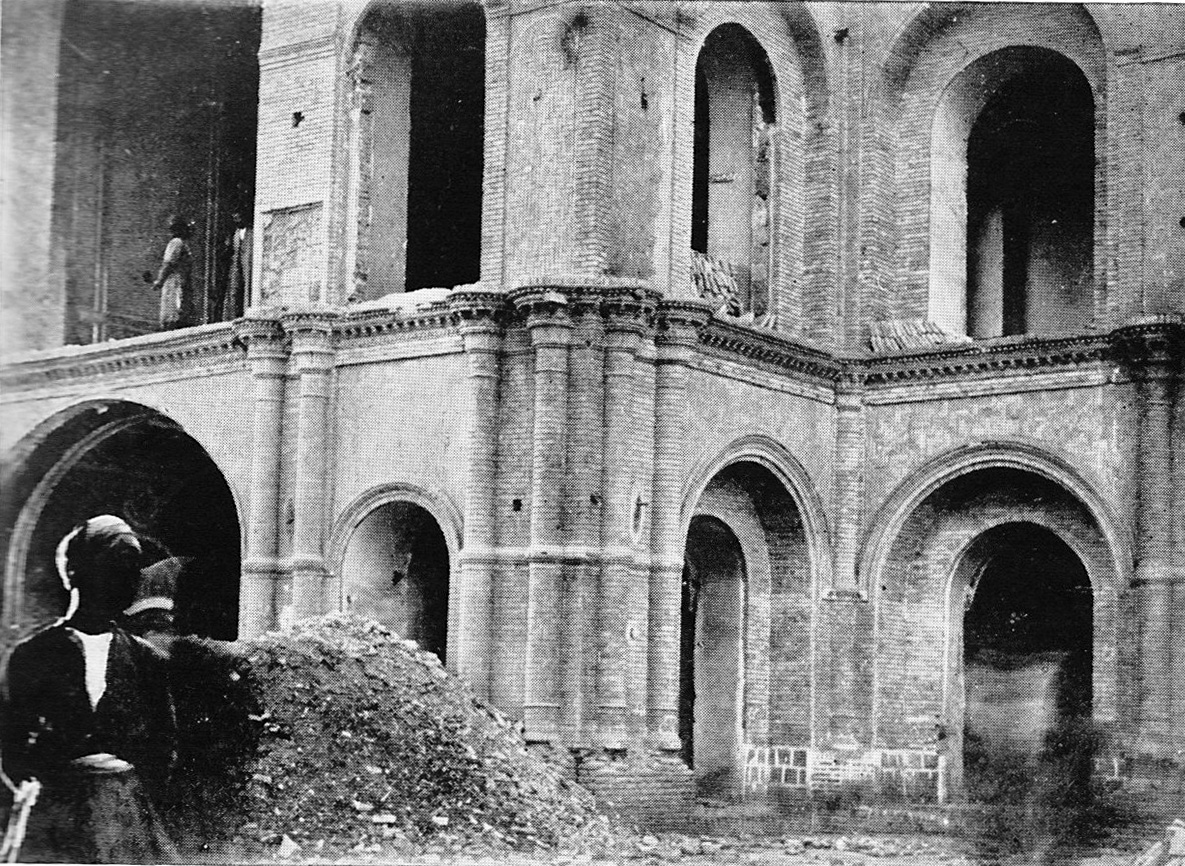
- The Majlis parliament building after the bombardement by the Cossack Brigade under the command of Colonel Liakhoff
Date	23 June 1908
Location	Tehran, Qajar Iran
Result	Dissolution of 1st Iranian Majlis; Arrest of Constitutionalists

Belligerents
Qajar Iran (Russian Empire) Persian Cossack Brigade	Parliament

Commanders and leaders
(Russian Empire) Vladimir Liakhov; Mohammad Ali Shah Qajar	Esmail Momtaz od-Dowleh (AWOL)

Strength
(Russian Empire) Around 800 Cossacks	100 constitutionalists
- Speaker of majlis Esmail Momtaz od-Dowleh escaped to Paris. In London, he was interviewed about the crisis which was then printed in European newspapers.

The 1908 bombardment of the Majlis of Iran (Persian: به توپ بستن مجلس) took place on 23 June 1908 in Tehran, during the Iranian Constitutional Revolution, when the Persian Cossack forces, commanded by Vladimir Liakhov and other Russian officers, bombarded and suppressed the Iranian parliament, the Majlis.

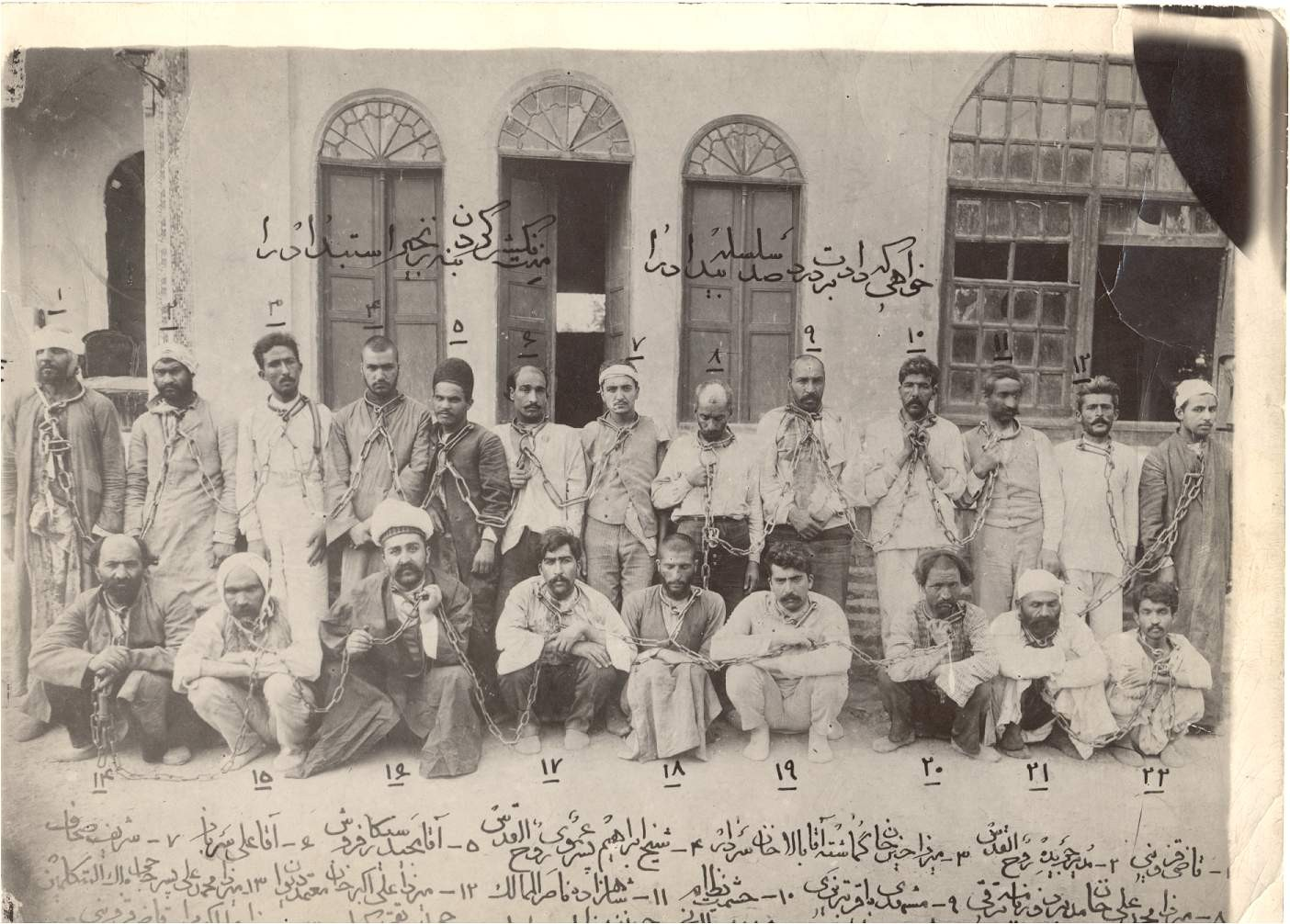
A number of constitutionalists arrested in the Shah Garden.

== History ==
Mohammad Ali Shah Qajar, who had ascended the throne on 3 January 1907, opposed the constitution of 1906 that had been ratified during the reign of his father, Mozaffar ad-Din Shah Qajar. After his ascension, the Anglo-Russian Convention in August 1907 divided Iran into a Russian sphere of influence in the North, a British sphere of influence in the South, and a neutral zone in the center. The British abandoned the Constitutionalists in favour of the Shah. The Shah later tried to subdue and eliminate the Majles with military and political support from Russia and Britain.

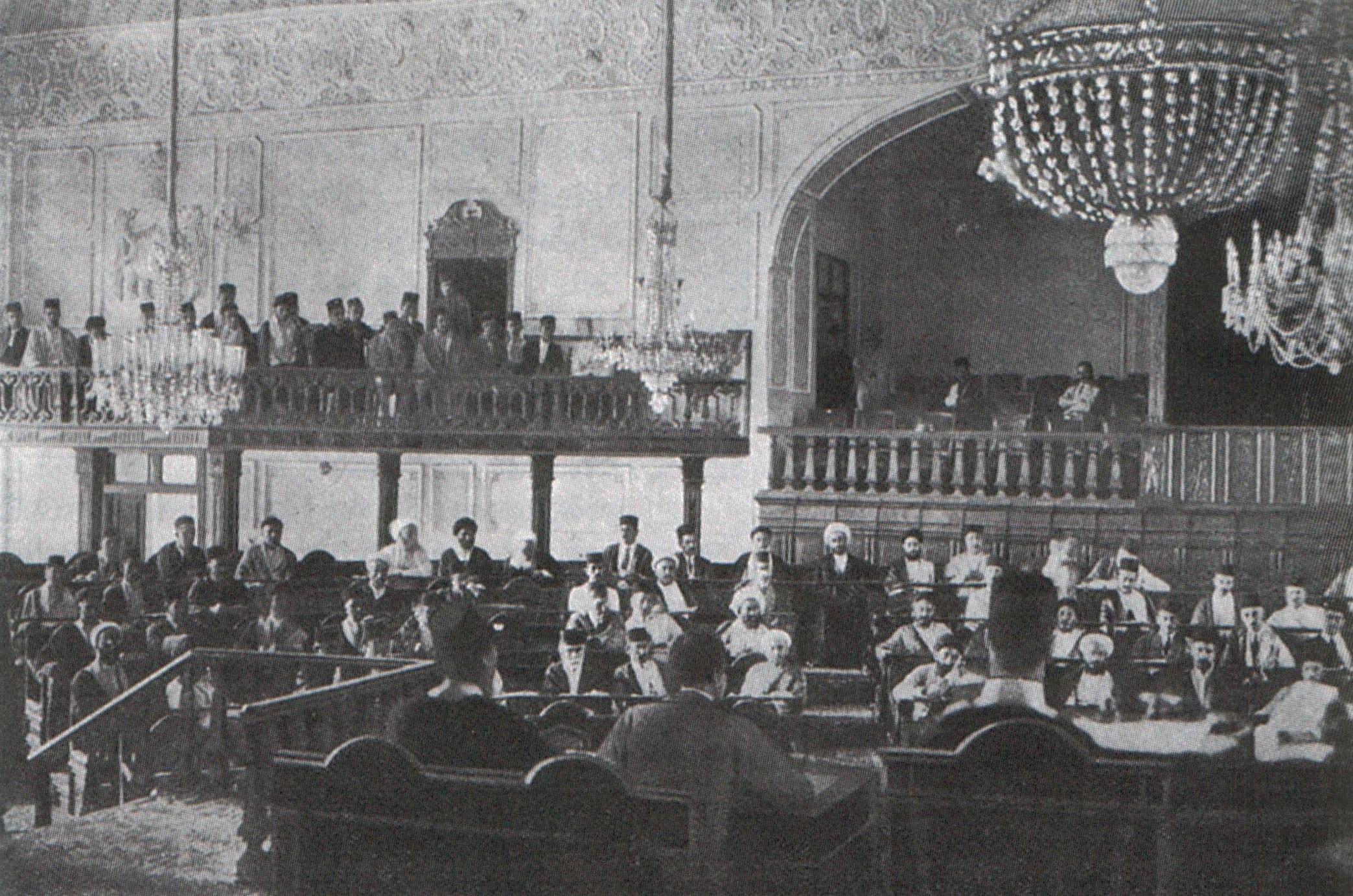
The parliament of Iran, 1906

During the constitutional revolution, the Shah confined himself to his residence at the Bagh-e Shah fort in the west of Tehran. He enlisted the help of the Cossack Brigade to control the revolution, leaving the city of Tehran at their mercy. The loyalty of the Cossack Brigade was fully guaranteed, not only by the previous purge carried out by commander Vladimir Liakhov, but also by the Shah's distribution of a special bonus in 1908.

Liakhov led the force in shelling the Majles and executing several leaders of the Constitutional Movement on 23 June 1908. His forces then plundered the parliament and damaged the building. This event led to the beginning of a period known as the "Minor Tyranny". Liakhov was subsequently made Military Governor of Tehran by the Shah, transforming the city into a military garrison.

However, in July 1909, pro-Constitution forces marched from Iran's Azerbaijan province to Tehran. They were able to capture Tehran, depose the Shah in favour of his son, Ahmad Shah Qajar, and re-establish the constitution. Colonel Liakhov and his forces served the Shah until July 1909, when the Shah abdicated and fled to Russia, resulting in the surrender of Liakhov and the Persian Cossack Brigade. Liakhov was pardoned by the Constitutional leaders probably for the fear of a Russian attack and was sent back to Saint Petersburg, where he would be dismissed soon after to serve in the Caucasus campaign of World War I.

== Gallery ==
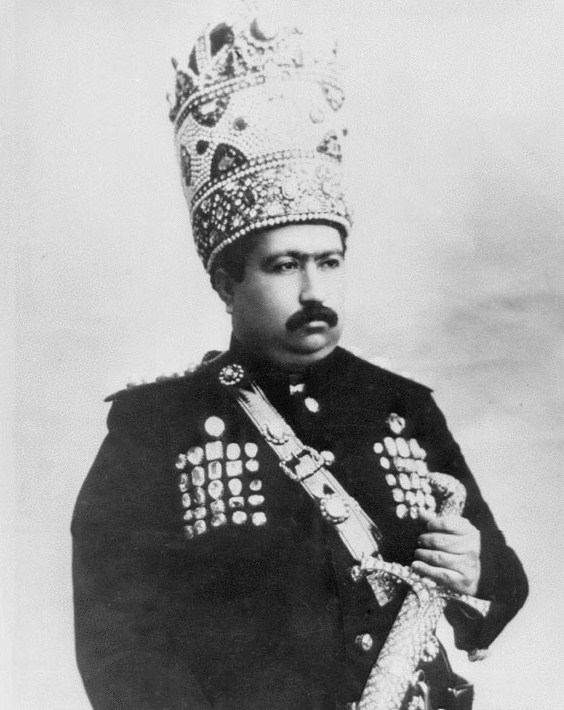
Mohammad Ali Shah Qajar, who was Shah of Iran at the time of the 1908 Tehran bombardment and wanted to subdue Majlis.

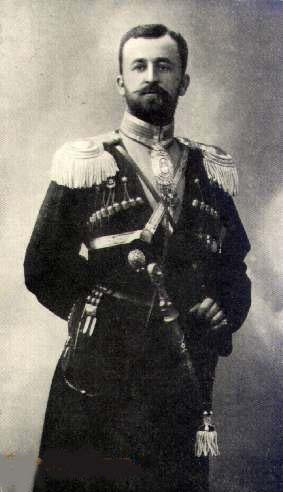
Colonel Liakhov, Commander of Persian Cossack Brigade, responsible for 1908 Tehran bombardment.

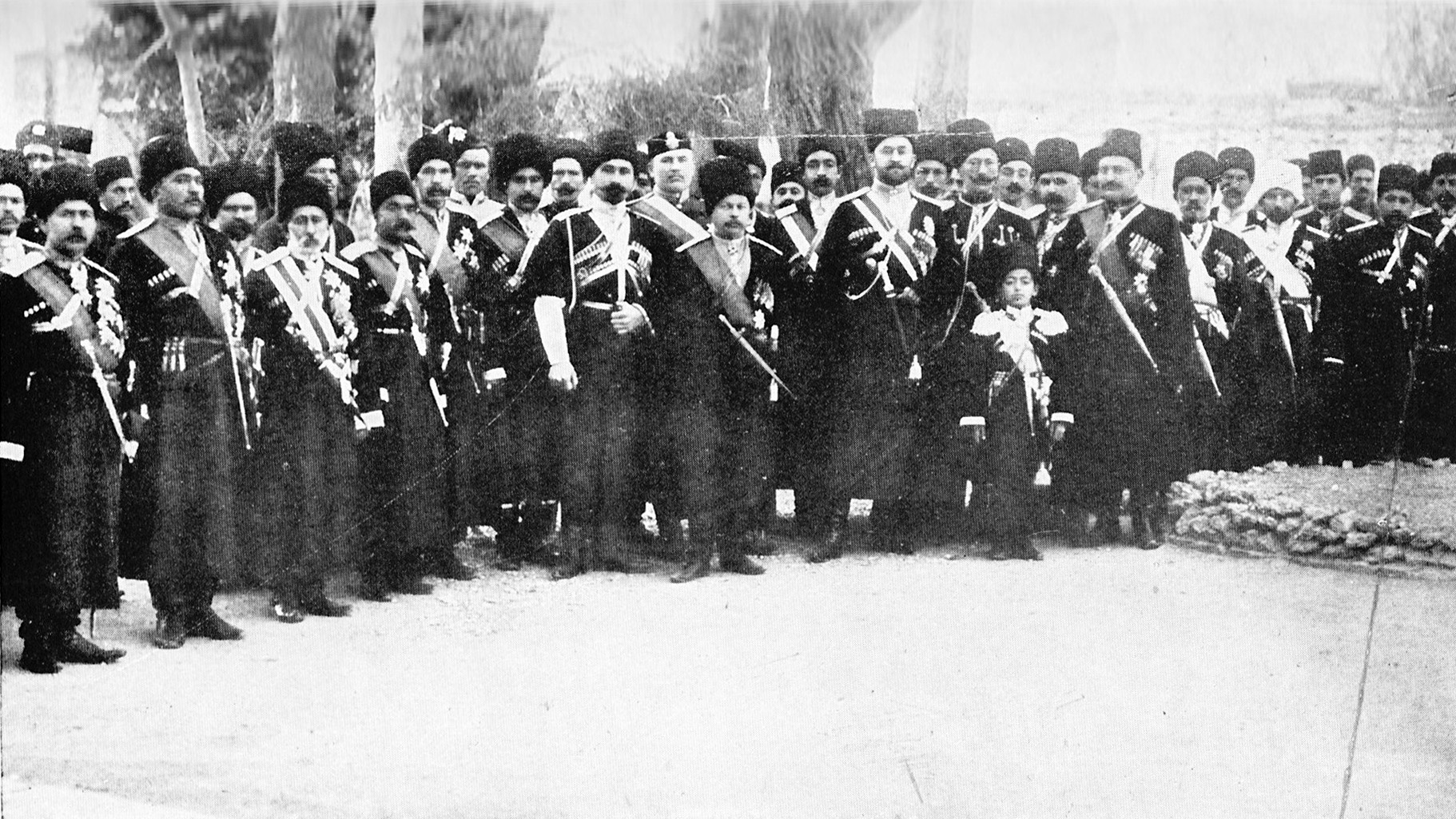
Persian Cossack Brigade (1909 photograph), the troops which lead the 1908 Tehran bombardment of Majles.

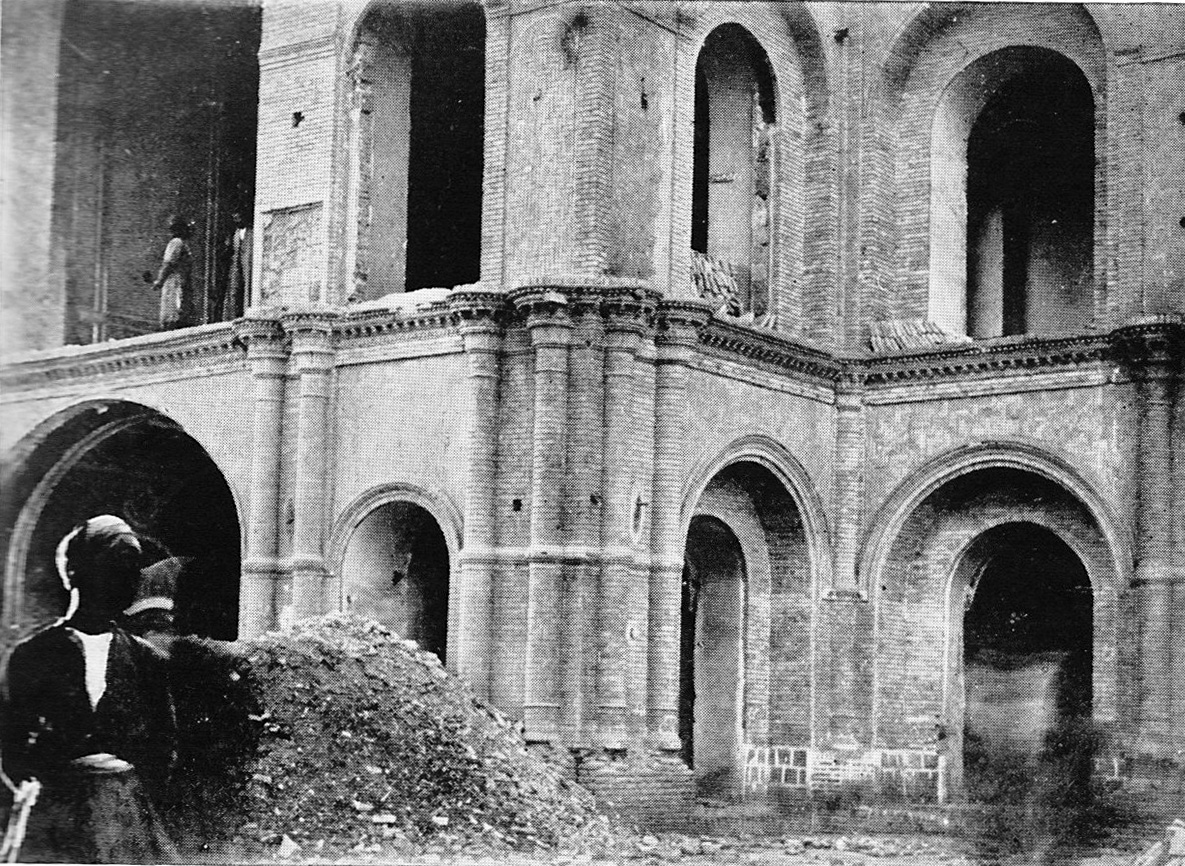
The Majlis building after the bombardment by the Cossack Brigade under the command of Colonel Liakhov, 1908

== See also ==
- Triumph of Tehran
