= Yakov Slashchov =

Russian general

Yakov Aleksandrovich Slashchov Krymsky
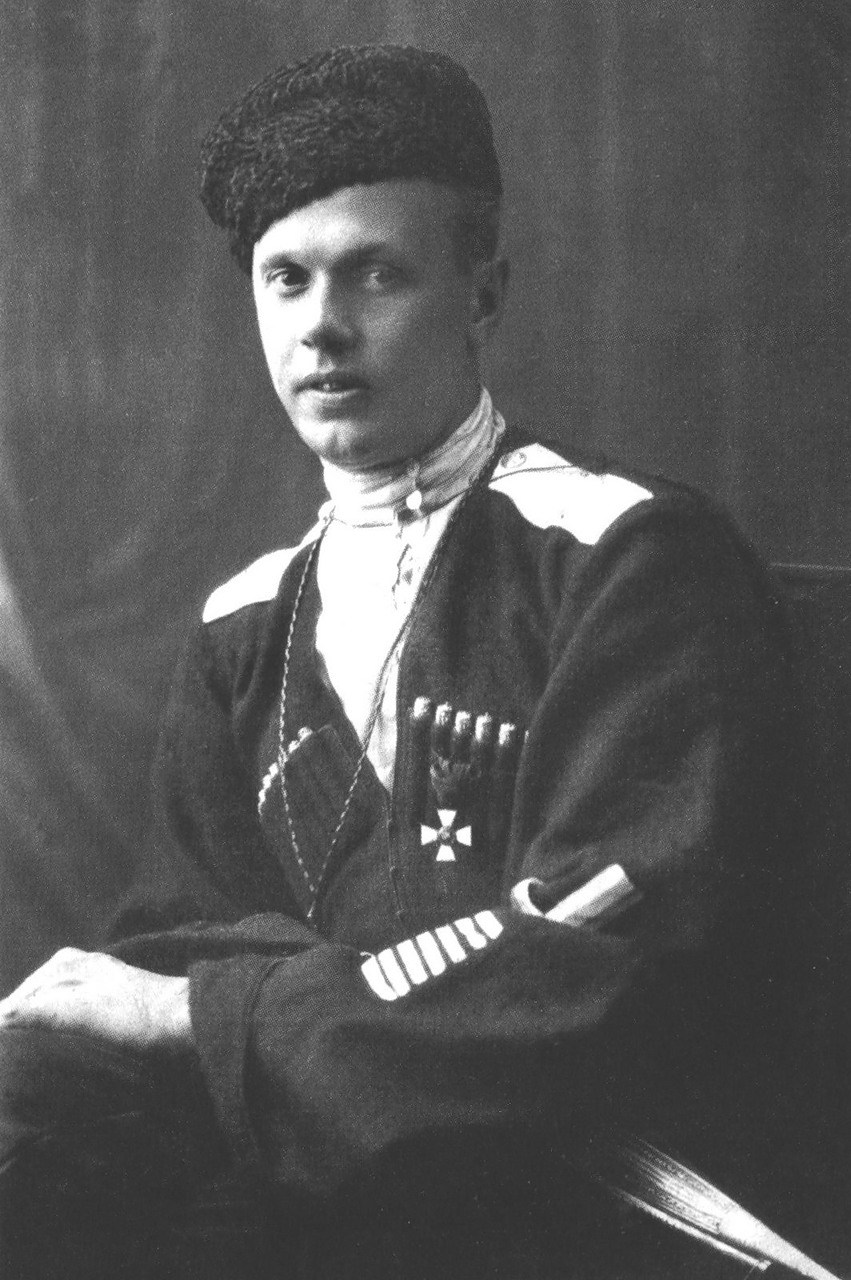
- Born: 29 December 1885; St. Petersburg, Russian Empire
- Died: 11 January 1929 (aged 43); Moscow, Russian SFSR, Soviet Union
- Cause of death: Assassination by gunshot
- Military career
- Allegiance: Russian Empire (Russia) White Movement; Russian SFSR
- Branch: Imperial Russian Army (Russia) Volunteer Army (Russian Soviet Federative Socialist Republic) Red Army
- Service years: 1905–1920; 1921–1929
- Rank: Lieutenant General
- Conflicts: World War I Russian Civil War

Yakov Aleksandrovich Slashchov-Krymsky (Russian: Яков Александрович Слащёв-Крымский; 29 December [O.S. 17 December] 1885 – 11 January 1929) was a Russian military officer, member of the White movement during the Russian Civil War. After leaving Crimea with the remnants of Baron Wrangel's forces, Slashchov eventually reconciled with the Soviets and returned from Constantinople to Moscow in 1921. In 1929 he was killed in his Moscow apartment by a Jewish man named Lazar Kalenberg, apparently in revenge for the execution of Kalenberg's brother, who'd been murdered under Slashchov's command during the Russian Civil War. After learning this, officials ruled that Kolenberg was "temporarily insane" when he killed Slashchov. He had his case archived and was released from custody.

Slashchov, known among his subordinates as "General Yasha", joined the Volunteer Army in December 1917 and was appointed Andrei Shkuro's chief of staff in May 1918. He was promoted to the rank of Major General in May 1919, and to that of Lieutenant General in May 1920, and was put in charge of the Crimean-Azov Corps of the Volunteer Army in December 1919. He succeeded in defending the Perekop Isthmus from the Red Army in late December 1919 and prevented the Bolsheviks from penetrating into the Crimean peninsula (January to March 1920).

Slashchov and his aide Sharov became notorious for their cruelty against the Jews and for looting the population (often against Wrangel's orders). In 1919, troops under his command were responsible for the murders of 200 Jews in Holovanivsk. Slashchov's sometimes bitter criticism of Wrangel's decisions led to him being convicted of insubordination and stripped of his rank. He retired to Constantinople, where he earned his living by gardening before returning to Soviet-ruled Crimea.

Slashov's example proved instrumental in bringing many other retired White Army officers back to Soviet Russia. He published a memoir entitled The Crimea in 1920 (1924) and delivered lectures at the Vystrel Higher Officers' Courses before he was killed by a man avenging a relative's death. The circumstances leading to his death are disputed. The central character of Mikhail Bulgakov's play Flight is allegedly based on Slashchov.
