= Nikolai Shilling =

Russian military officer (1870-1946)

- Николай Николаевич Шиллинг
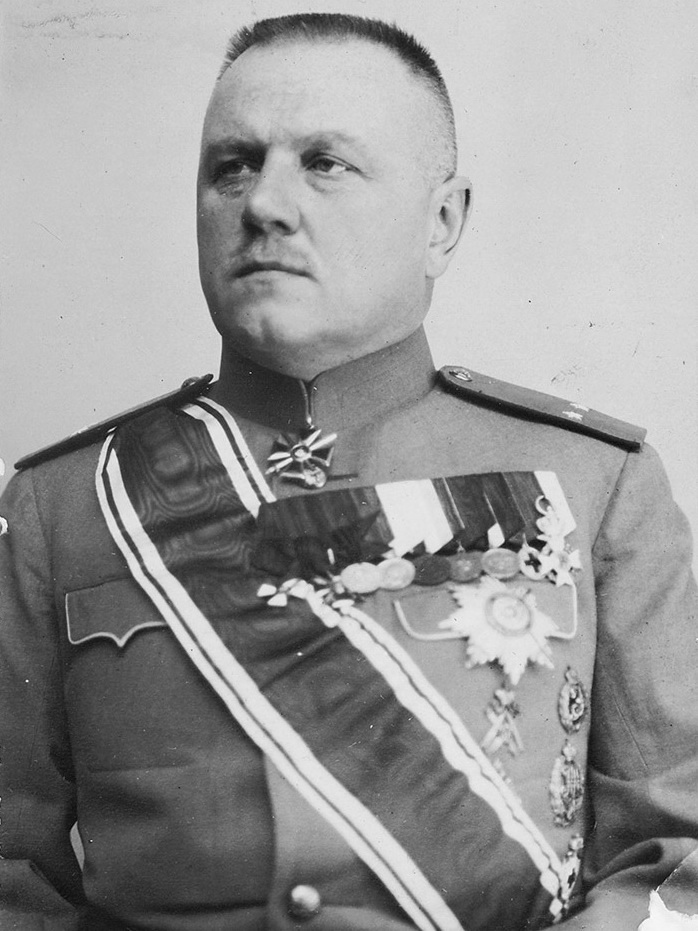
- Born: December 16, 1870
- Died: 1946 (aged 75–76); Prague
- Alma mater: 1st Pavel Military School
- Military career
- Allegiance: Russia
- Branch: Armed Forces of South Russia
- Rank: Major General
- Unit: Izmailovsky Regiment
- Commands: Izmaylovsky Regiment
- Conflicts: Russian Civil War

Nikolai Nikolayevich Shilling (Russian: Николай Николаевич Шиллинг; 16 December 1870 – 1946) was a Russian military officer and general in the White Armed Forces of South Russia during the Russian Civil War.

== Life ==
Shilling joined the Nikolai Cadet Corps in 1888 and the 1st Pavel Military School in 1890. He served in the elite guard, the Izmailovsky Regiment, between 1888 and 1913, and reached the rank of colonel in 1909. During the First World War he commanded the 5th Finnish Rifles Regiment, until he was promoted in 1915 to major general and put in command of a brigade of the 2nd Finnish Rifle Division. In 1916 he went to command the Izmaylovsky Regiment and between July 1917 and February 1918, the 17th Army Corps.

After the signing of the Brest-Litovsk Treaty, Shilling entered the service of the German-controlled Ukrainian State of Pavlo Skoropadskyi until its collapse in December 1918, when he joined the White Russian Volunteer Army. He commanded the 5th Infantry Division between February and June 1919, and then until August, the 3rd Army Corps. He distinguished himself in that period by taking Kherson, Nikolaev, and Odessa. Between September 1919 and February 1920, he was military commander and governor of Ukraine and the Crimea, until he was forced out of Odessa by the Red Army's Odessa Operation (1920). He was widely criticised for the disastrous evacuation of the city on 6 and 7 February 1920, when thousands of White soldiers and civilians were left behind to fall into the hands of the Red Army and the Cheka.

When Anton Denikin was replaced by Pyotr Wrangel at the head of the AFSR, Shilling was retired and emigrated to Czechoslovakia, where he temporarily led the Foreign Union of Russian War Veterans. When the Red Army entered that country in 1945, the SMERSH arrested him, although shortly after, he was released. He died the following year in Prague.

== Sources ==
- Smele, Jonathan D. (2015). Historical Dictionary of the Russian Civil Wars, 1916-1926. Rowman & Littlefield, pp. 1026-1027. ISBN 9781442252813.
