= Sardar Kandy =

Sardar Kandy سردار كندئ
- Village
- Location within Iran
- Coordinates: 38°30′37″N 46°44′36″E
- Country: Iran
- Province: East Azerbaijan
- County: Varzaqan
- Bakhsh: Central
- Rural District: Ozomdel-e Jonubi

Population (2006)
  - Total: 29
- Time zone: UTC+3:30 (IRST)
  - Summer (DST): UTC+4:30 (IRDT)

Sardar Kandy (Persian: سردار كندئ, also Romanized as Sardār Kandy; also known as Besheshai, Besh Shāy, Bīshak, and Byshechay) is a village in Ozomdel-e Jonubi Rural District, in the Central District of Varzaqan County, East Azerbaijan Province, Iran. At the 2006 census, its population was 29, in 7 families.
