= Gerrus province =

Historic province of Iran

Gerrus (Persian: گروس) was a small, mountainous province of Iran, situated between Zanjan province (formerly Khamseh province) and the Azarbaijan region in the north, and Kurdistan province and Hamadan province in the south. As of 1911, its population was estimated at 80,000, and its capital was Bijar. Gerrus is now incorporated within Zanjan and Kurdistan provinces.
