= Odessa Operation (1920) =

- Part of the Southern Front of the Russian Civil War
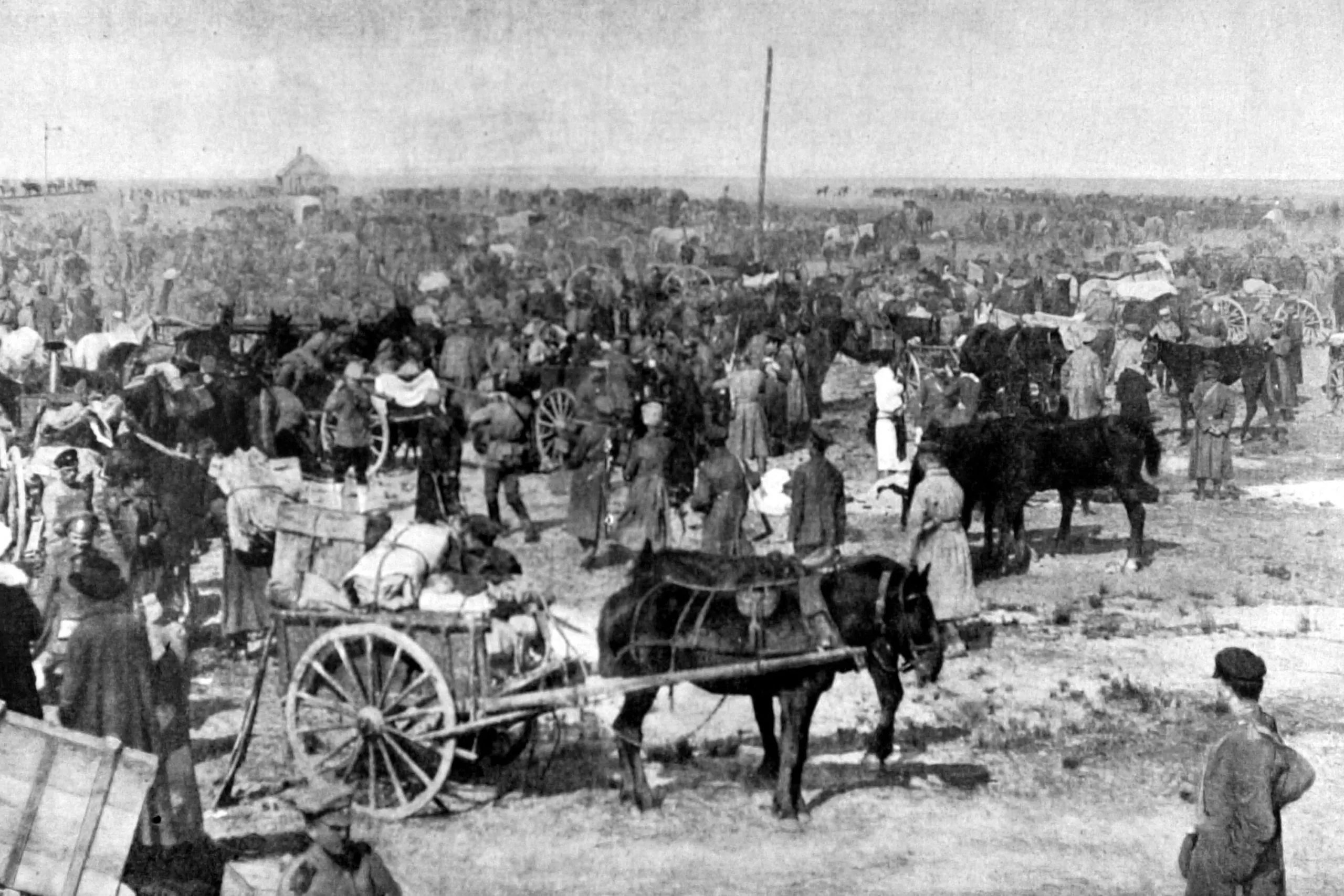
- Refugees of Odessa and White Army troops trying to flee from the Red Army.
Date	11 January – 8 February 1920
Location	South-Western Ukraine
Result	Red Army victory
Territorial changes	Right-bank Ukraine and Transnistria occupied by the Red Army.

Belligerents
Russian Soviet Federative Socialist Republic	Armed Forces of South Russia

Commanders and leaders
(Russian Soviet Federative Socialist Republic) Alexander Yegorov; (Russian Soviet Federative Socialist Republic) Sergei Mezheninov; (Russian Soviet Federative Socialist Republic) Ieronim Uborevich	(Russian Empire) Nikolai Shilling

Units involved
Southwestern Front: 12th Army; 14th Army	Novorossiysk Oblast Army Group

Casualties and losses
Unknown	13,000 prisoners

The Odessa operation (11 January – 8 February 1920) was an offensive operation during the Russian Civil War of the South Western Front of the Red Army against the Novorossiysk Oblast Army Group of the White Armed Forces of South Russia. The operation was a success for the Red Army, as Odessa was taken on 8 February and, despite an evacuation over the Black Sea supported by the British Royal Navy, many White soldiers and material were captured.

== Capture of Odessa ==
After the failed White Advance on Moscow in Summer 1919, the Red Army had started a counteroffensive in autumn 1919, which after several hard-fought battles, had by winter 1919-1920 turned into a rout of the White forces.

On 17 January 1920 the troops of the Red Army seized Krivoi Rog (now Kryvyi Rih) and Apostolove. On 24 January they captured Yelisavetgrad (now Kropyvnytskyi) and on 25 January, Uman. By the end of January, Kherson, Mykolaiv and Voznesensk were captured. On 3 February Olviopol (now Pervomaisk) and Ochakov (now Ochakiv) were captured.

On 6 February the Red Army approached Odessa. Early in the morning of 7 February they broke into the city, and on 8 February Odessa was completely captured by the Red Army. The Red Army was assisted in taking the city by Odessan workers who, on the orders of the Revolutionary Committee, took up arms and seized critical points in Odessa just before the approach of the regular units.

== Evacuation by the sea ==
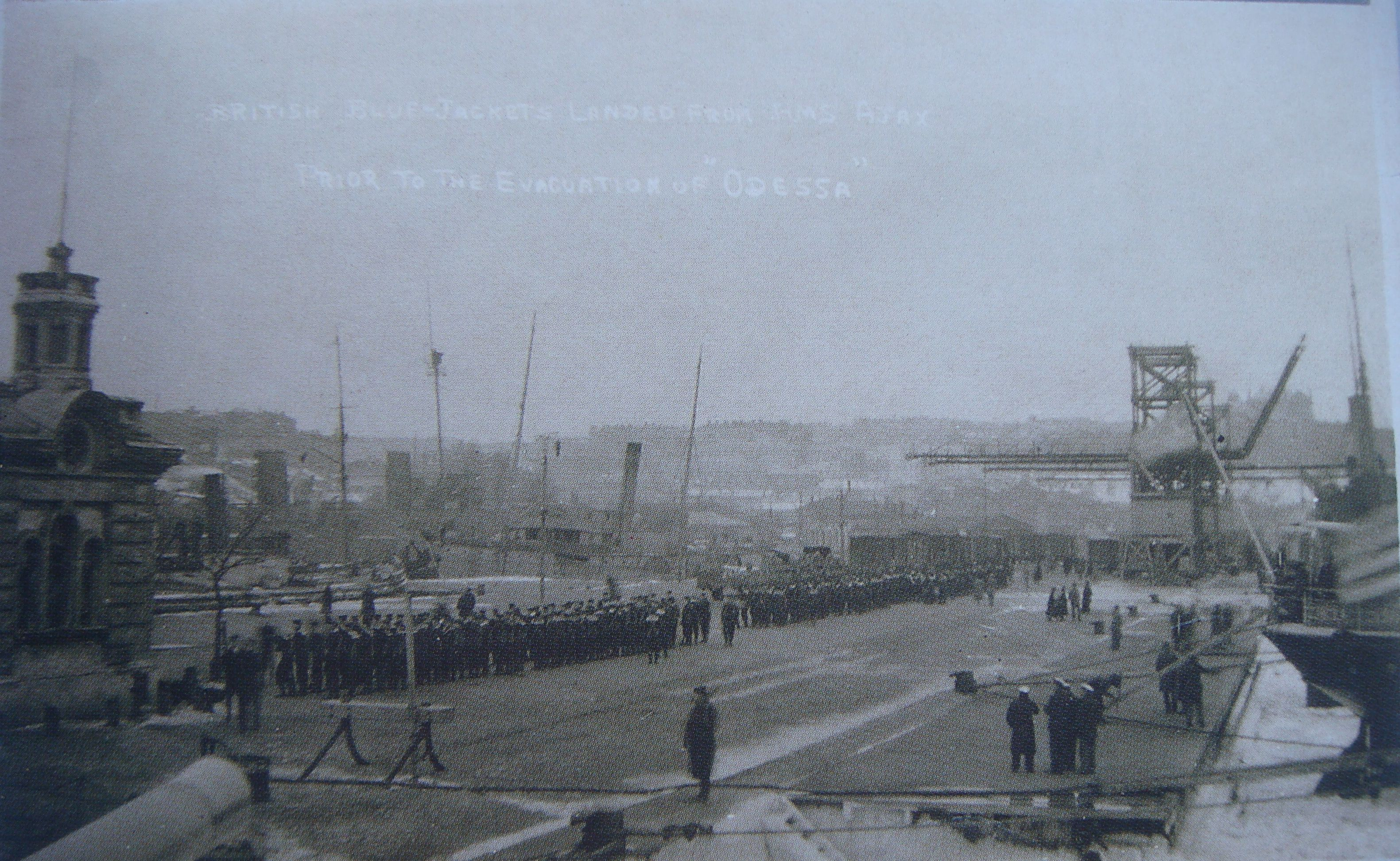
British troops in Odessa port, February 1920

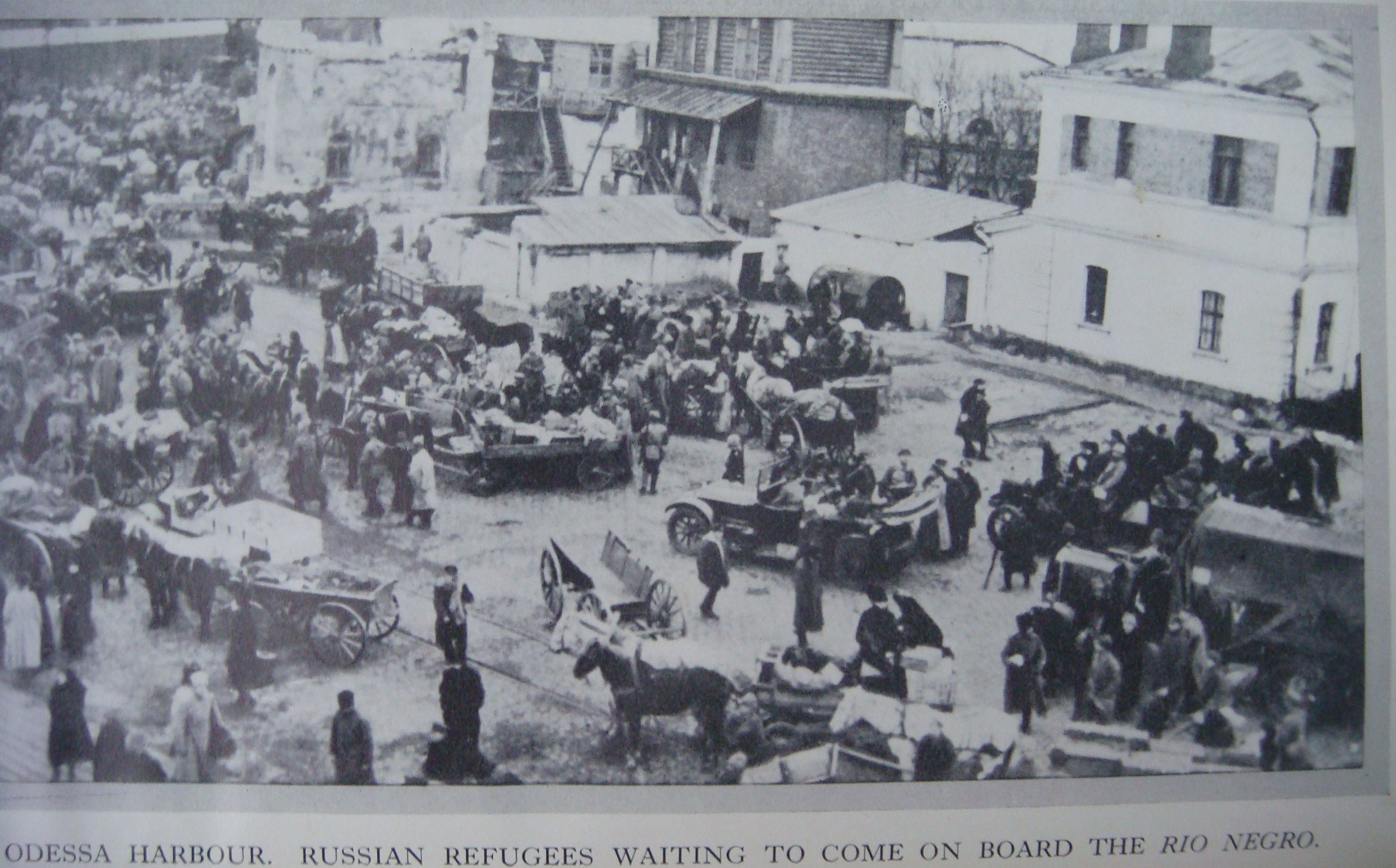
Russian refugees waiting to come on board the Rio Negro

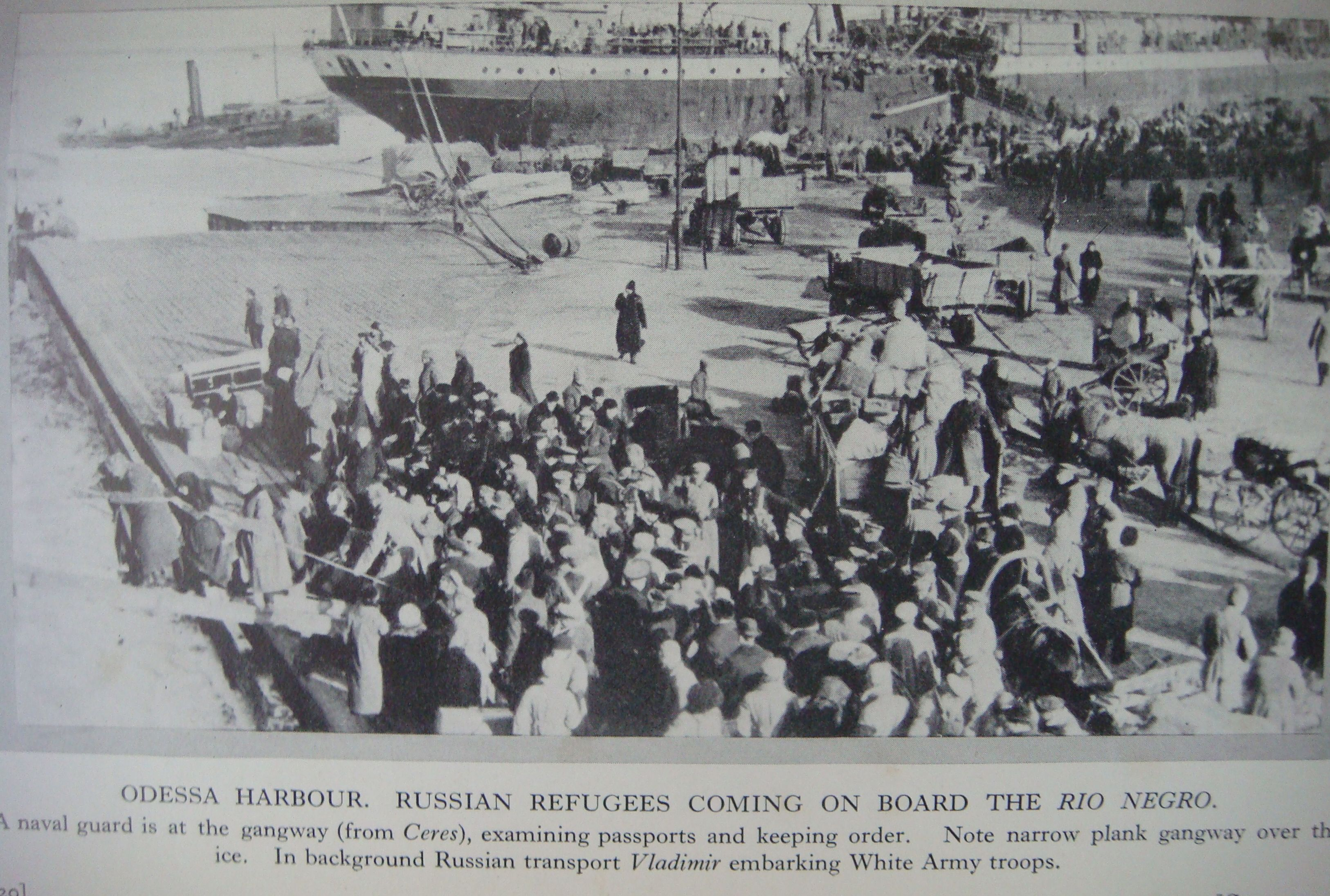
Russian refugees coming on board the Rio Negro

Aware of the desperate situation, the command of the AFSR in Odessa had started an evacuation over the Black Sea on 3 February. Contemporaries of events and historians called the Odessa evacuation of 1920, ill prepared and "mediocre". Only 1 in 3 could be evacuated. In the city of Odessa, 3 AFSR generals, about 200 officers and 3,000 soldiers (including 1,500 sick and wounded in hospitals) were taken prisoner.

According to reports of the Odessa Soviet newspapers of those days, 300,000 pounds of grain also remained in the port of Odessa, 50,000 pounds were found on barges moored in the quarantine harbor. On the ship "Alexandria" a load of brand new British motorcycles of the brand "Triumph" was found, sent by England to the AFSR and 3,000 pounds of coal. The Railroad tracks were clogged with abandoned wagons with a variety of goods evacuated from Kiev and current Southern Ukraine, including 130,000 pounds of firewood.

The total number of evacuees is difficult to calculate, as transport ships with evacuees dispersed to different ports and many refugees were evacuated privately. Soviet sources reported 3,000 evacuees, which did not correspond to reality. White Guard sources reported 16,000 as a reasonable minimum number of evacuees, with about 40,000 people willing to be evacuated. From the military equipment and supplies, it was possible to evacuate all the tanks that had arrived in Odessa from Nikolaev (now Mykolaiv), almost all serviceable armored vehicles and parts of the equipment of the technical troops, cars and aviation assets.

The British ships involved in the evacuation were :

- HMT Rio Negro, received about 1,400 refugees, wounded officers and cadets. Went to the port of Thessaloniki (Greece)
- HMT Rio Pardo, transported refugees to Greece
- HMS Ajax
- HMS Cardiff
- HMS Ceres
- HMS Emperor of India
- several destroyers
- Coalship Votan

The French sent

- French cruiser Jules Michelet
- French cruiser Waldeck-Rousseau

And the US sent the destroyer USS Talbot with Hugo W. Koehler on board.

== Ovidiopol detachment ==
The garrison of Odessa and other parts of the AFSR, which had previously retreated to the city, as well as various detachments of "militiamen" could not be evacuated by sea. They united in the "Ovidiopol detachment" and were ordered to march to the border with Romania. They were accompanied by a large number of civilians, families of officers of the Volunteer Army, foreigners, wounded and about 600 cadets of the Odessa Cadet Corps (most of which were junior grades - 10-12 years). About 16,000 people, of which no more than 3,000 were able to carry weapons, departed in mid-winter from Odessa on 7 February and moved to the Gross-Liebental - Ovidiopol area, from where they intended to go to Romania. But they were not admitted into Romania by the Romanian authorities and found themselves trapped as the Red units took Maiac and Tiraspol, thus depriving the "Ovidiopol detachment" of the possibility of uniting with the "Bredov detachment", and marching towards Poland.

The Ovidiopol detachment was not allowed by the Romanians into their territory. The Romanians did not even let the Cadet children enter, but fired their artillery when a Cadet column headed towards them over the ice across the Dniester. The trapped Ovidiopol detachment lost hundreds of people from attacks by the Red cavalry, shelling by Romanian troops and local marauders. After 5-7 days, the remaining 12,000 people capitulated. At that time, many officers (including General Vasiliev and Baron Maidel) committed suicide, preferring death to Bolshevik captivity.

== The Bredov detachment ==
The units of the AFSR under command of Lieutenant-General Nikolai Bredov and all troops in right-bank Ukraine, were ordered by Lieutenant-General Schilling to march towards Poland. Accompanied by numerous refugees and civilians, they carried out an unprecedented winter march, under constant pressure of superior Red forces, and reached Poland. This march became known as the Bredov Campaign.

== Results ==
By the end of February 1920, all White forces had been chased from Western-Ukraine. The AFSR now only held the Northern Caucasus and Crimea.

In total, about 1,200 officers were captured by the Reds. All of them were placed in concentration camps, where they were gradually shot. A mass shooting was held on 5 May 1920. In Odessa, 100 guns of different calibers, four armored vehicles, four armored trains, several hundred thousand shells and cartridges, some engineering, automobile, aviation and other property, and tons of food were captured by the Red Army.

== See also ==
- Bibliography of the Russian Revolution and Civil War
- Outline of the Russian Revolution and Civil War
- Index of articles related to the Russian Revolution and Civil War
- The "Russian" Civil Wars, 1916–1926: Ten Years That Shook the World
- Russia in Flames: War, Revolution, Civil War, 1914–1921
- Russia in Revolution: An Empire in Crisis, 1890 to 1928
- Russia: Revolution and Civil War, 1917—1921
- The Russian Revolution: A New History
