= Mirza Masoud Ansari Garmrudi =

Iranian politician (1790–1848)

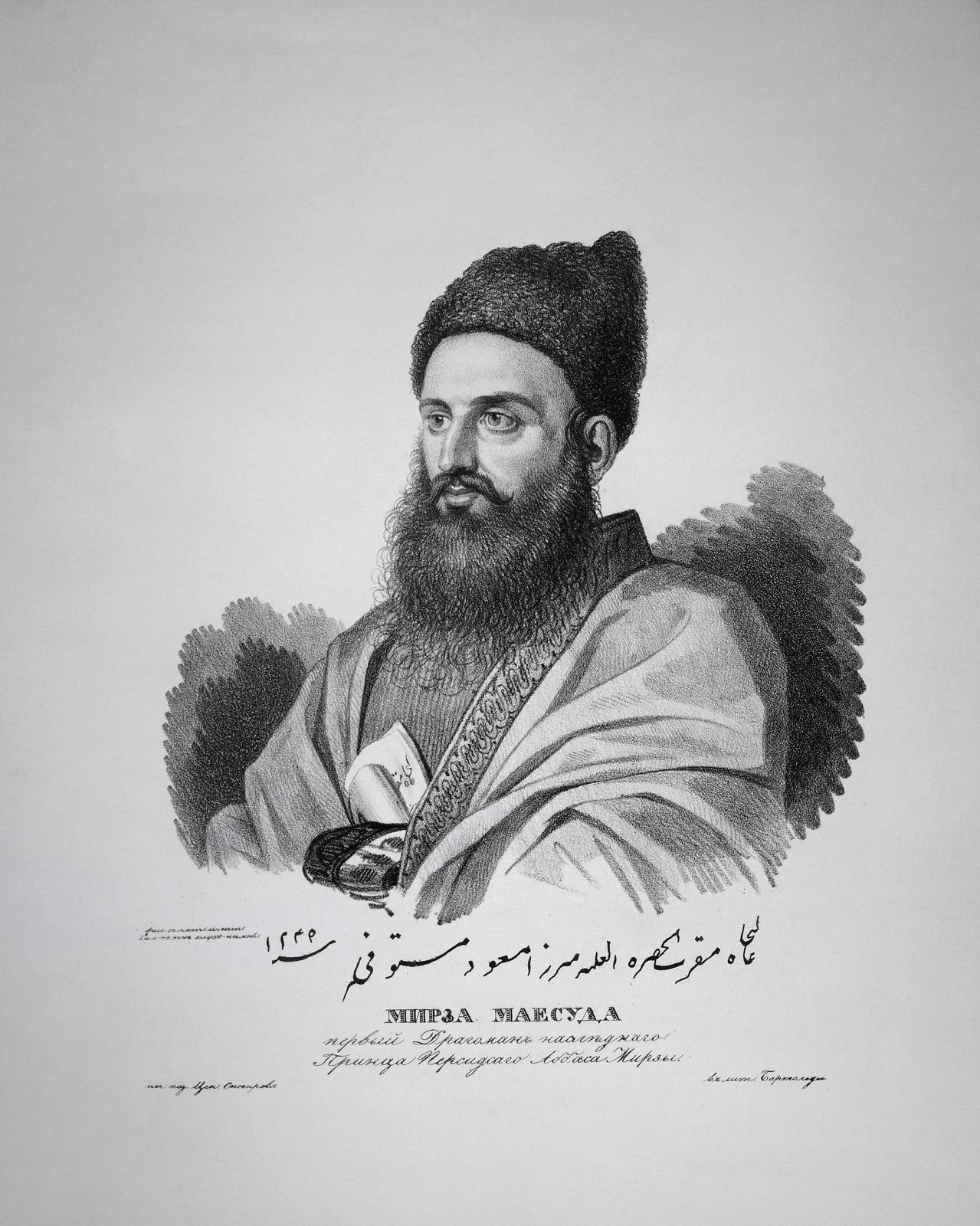
- Portrait of Mirza Masoud Ansari Garmrudi by Karl Hampeln, dated 1829.

Minister of Foreign Affairs
- In office 1835–1838
- Monarch: Mohammad Shah Qajar
- Preceded by: Mirza Ali Farahani
- Succeeded by: Mirza Abolhassan Khan Ilchi
- In office 1845/46–1848
- Monarch: Mohammad Shah Qajar
- Preceded by: Haji Mirza Aqasi
- Succeeded by: Amir Kabir

Personal details
- Born: 1790
- Died: 1848 (aged 57–58)
- Relations: Mirza Saeed Khan Ansari (cousin)
- Parent: Mirza Abdol Rahim Ansari (father)

Mirza Masoud Ansari Garmrudi (Persian: میرزا مسعود انصاری گرم‌رودی; died 1848) was an Iranian politician who served as the Minister of Foreign Affairs twice (1835–1838 and 1845–1848).

He was born in 1790. He was the son of Mirza Abdol Rahim Ansari and cousin of Mirza Saeed Khan Ansari. He became the secretary and translator of the crown prince Abbas Mirza since he was the first Iranian official to become fluent in French. In 1829, following the murder of the Russian diplomat Alexander Griboyedov by the people of Tehran, a delegation led by prince Khosrow Mirza was sent to the Russian capital Saint Petersburg to apologize. The delegation included Mirza Mohammad Khan Zangana, Mirza Masoud, Mirza Saleh Shirazi, Hossein Ali Beg (Khosrow Mirza's uncle), Mirza Taqi Khan Farahani (the future Amir Kabir), Hajji Baba Afshar, Fazel Khan Garrusi, Mohammad Hossein Khan, Magniago de Borea (Khosrow Mirza's French tutor) and Barthélémy Semino (a French military advisor). The delegation's journey to Saint Petersburg was recorded by Mirza Masoud's secretary Mirza Mostafa Afshar. He described how the Russian emperor was impressed by the French knowledge of Mirza Masoud. In 1835, Mirza Masoud was appointed as the Minister of Foreign Affairs by Mohammad Shah Qajar (r. 1834–1848), which he served as until 1838. Around the same period, Mirza Masoud married Zia ol-Saltaneh, the seventh daughter of Fath-Ali Shah Qajar (r. 1797–1834). Together, they had two daughters and two sons. From 1845 to 1848, Mirza Masoud served as the Minister of Foreign Affairs again. He died in 1848 and was buried in Najaf.

== Sources ==
- Bamdad, Mehdi (1972). شرح حال رجال ایران در قرن ۱۲ و ۱۳ و ۱۴ هجری [Biographies of [notable] personages of Iran in the 12th, 13th, and 14th/18th, 19th, and 20th centuries, vol. 4].
- Bournoutian, George (2015). "Ḵosrow Mirzā Qājār". In Yarshater, Ehsan (ed.). Encyclopædia Iranica (Online ed.). Encyclopædia Iranica Foundation. ISBN 978-0710090959.
- Brookshaw, Dominic Parviz (2006). "Żiāʾ-al-Salṭana". In Yarshater, Ehsan (ed.). Encyclopædia Iranica (Online ed.). Encyclopædia Iranica Foundation. ISBN 978-0710090959.
