= Jafar Khan Moshir od-Dowleh =

Iranian politician (1790s–1862)

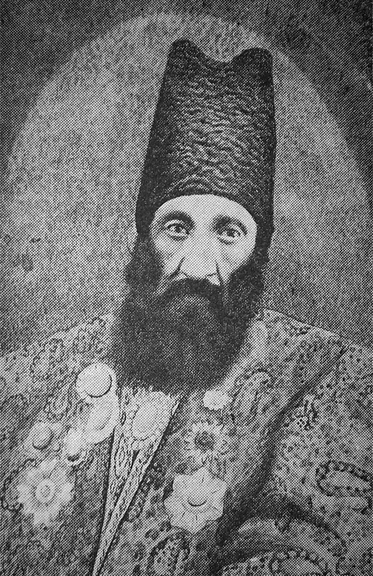

Head of the Council of state
- In office September 1858 – November 1862
- Monarch: Naser al-Din Shah Qajar
- Preceded by: Mirza Aqa Khan Nuri (prime minister)
- Succeeded by: Mirza Mohammad Khan Sepahsalar (prime minister)

Personal details
- Born: 1790s Farahan, Qajar Iran
- Died: November 1862 (aged 63–72) Mashhad, Qajar Iran
- Resting place: Imam Reza shrine, Mashhad
- Children: Mohammad-Sadeq Khan Sartip
- Relatives: Mirza Bozorg Qa'em-Maqam (cousin)

Mirza Jafar Khan Moshir od-Dowleh (Persian: میرزا جعفرخان مشیرالدوله; 1790s – November 1862), also known as Mohandes Bashi (مهندس‌باشی), was an Iranian politician, who was the head of the Council of state from September 1858 until his death in November 1862. His office was similar to the prime minister office, which was vacant during his tenure.

== Biography ==
=== Background and education ===
Jafar Khan was born in the 1790s in Farahan, a region in central Iran notable for its high literacy and proficiency in statesmanship. He was the son of Mirza Mohammad Taqi Vazir and nephew of Haji Mirza Hasan, who was the father of Mirza Bozorg Qa'em-Maqam, a bureaucrat who served as the chief minister of the crown prince Abbas Mirza. It was under Mirza Bozorg Qa'em-Maqam and his son Abol-Qasem Qa'em-Maqam that Jafar Khan received his education in the city of Tabriz.

In 1815, together with four other students, Jafar Khan was sent by Abbas Mirza to study in England. Their journey to England, referred to as a wanderjahren by the modern historian Nile Green, was an interchange of ideas, which had been made by possible by the diplomatic exchanges between Iran and Great Britain. Jafar Khan is often mentioned in the travelogue one of the students, Mirza Saleh Shirazi. Each student had an area of expertise, with Jafar Khan's being centered around mathematics and engineering. He became an expert in both general engineering and military engineering, including artillery and fort construction. The students returned to Iran in 1819, becoming known as the "first caravan of enlightenment".

=== Career ===
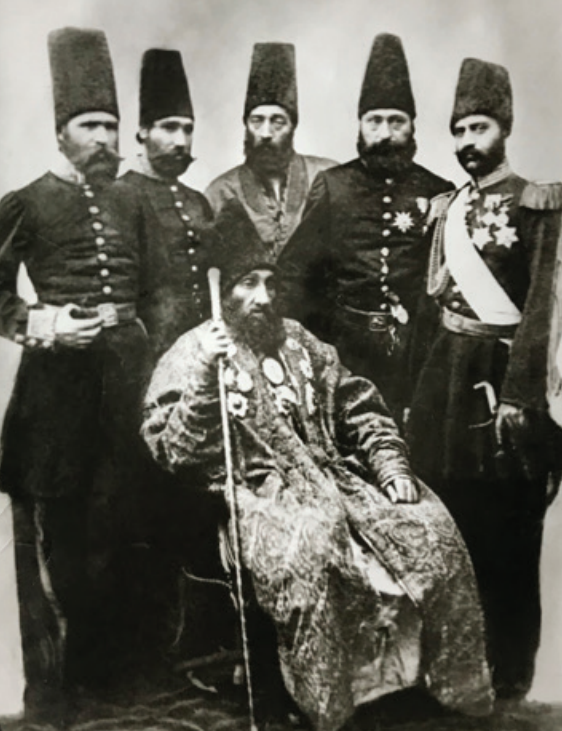
Jafar Khan Moshir od-Dowleh (seated) at the Court of St James's

Having returned to Iran, the goal of the students was to use their new knowledge to change Iran both internally and its relations with its neighbours. Their newly acquired information from outside was transferred into Iranian society. Jafar Khan became the nation's chief engineer and was granted the village of Varnakesh as his personal property. He spent several years in Tabriz until 1836, when he was appointed by Mohammad Shah Qajar (r. 1834–1848) as the Iranian ambassador to the Ottoman court in Constantinople. One of the events that occurred during this tenure was the attack on the Iranian town of Mohammerah by Ali Reza Pasha, the Ottoman governor of the Baghdad Eyalet. Jafar Khan protested to the Ottomans, who disregarded him, as they considered Mohammerah to be a part of the Baghdad Eyalet. As a result Jafar Khan went back to Iran, where he urged the prime minister Haji Mirza Aqasi to capture the city of Baghdad.

To avoid these types of occurrences, Iran and the Ottoman Empire agreed to start negotiations to demarcate their borders in 1844. Jafar Khan was chosen to represent Iran in a conference with the Ottomans in the town of Erzurum. However, Mirza Taqi Khan ended up going in his stead, as he had become severely sick upon reaching Tabriz. In 1848, Jafar Khan was appointed as an official of the Ministry of Foreign Affairs. After Mohammad Shah's death in the same year, his successor Naser al-Din Shah (r. 1848–1896) assigned Jafar Khan to handle foreign affairs in Tabriz.

To finalize a defined Ottoman-Iranian frontier, a commission from both sides was formed following the conclusion of the Erzurum conference. Jafar Khan represented the Iranian side, while Darvish Pasha represented the Ottoman side. The negotiations took place in Mohammerah, where British and Russian representatives were also present. In September 1858, Naser al-Din Shah dismissed Mirza Aqa Khan Nuri as his prime minister. Instead of appointing a new prime minister, he created six ministries which each had its own minister; interior, foreign affairs, war, finance, justice, and state duties, which together formed the Council of state. He appointed Jafar Khan as the leader of the Council of state, which was similar to the prime minister office. He would hold this position until his death.

In 1860–1861, Jafar Khan served as the ambassador to London. From this period henceforward, an Iranian ambassador maintained a permanent presence in London. In 1862, Jafar Khan was appointed as the custodian of the Imam Reza shrine in the city of Mashhad. He stayed there for a few months, until dying from an illness in November 1862. He was buried in the Dar ol-Hoffaz portico of the shrine.

Jafar Khan had one son named Mohammad-Sadeq Khan Sartip, who became a brigadier general during his father's lifetime.

== Sources ==
- Amanat, Abbas (2017). Iran: A Modern History. Yale University Press. ISBN 978-0300112542.
- Behrooz, Maziar (2023). Iran at War: Interactions with the Modern World and the Struggle with Imperial Russia. I.B. Tauris. ISBN 978-0-7556-3737-9.
- Davud, Seyyed Ali Al-i (2019). "جعفرخان مشیرالدوله". The Great Islamic Encyclopaedia (in Persian).
- Green, Nile (2009). "Among the dissenters: reciprocal ethnography in nineteenth-century Inglistan". Journal of Global History. 4 (2). Cambridge University Press: 293–315. doi:10.1017/S1740022809003167.
- Wright, Denis (2002). "Great Britain ii. An Overview of Relations: Safavid to the Present". In Yarshater, Ehsan (ed.). Encyclopædia Iranica (Online ed.). Encyclopædia Iranica Foundation. ISBN 978-0710090959.
- Ziai, Hossein. "Hossein Ziai Genealogy" (PDF). hosseinziai.com. pp. 17–37.
