= Khosrow Mirza =

Qajar prince (1813–1875)

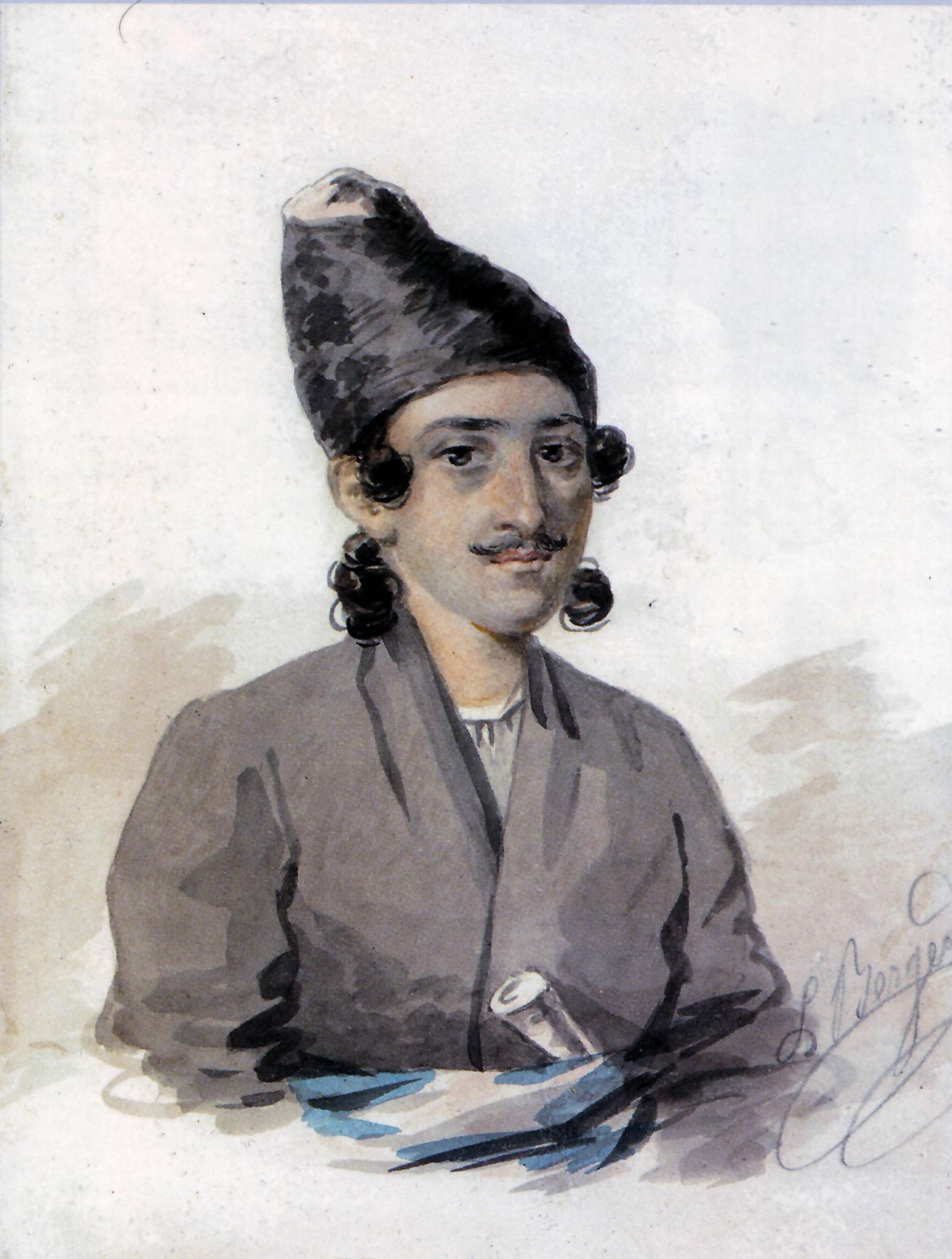
- Portrait of Khosrow Mirza by F. Breger, 1829, held at the State Literature Museum
- Born: 1813
- Died: 21 October 1875 (aged 62)
- House: Qajar dynasty
- Father: Abbas Mirza
- Mother: Khurde Khanum
- Religion: Islam
- Occupation: Prince of Qajar dynasty

Prince Khosrow Mirza Qajar (Persian: شاهزاده خسرو میرزا قاجار; 1813 – 21 October 1875) was the seventh son of Crown Prince Abbas Mirza and a grandson of Fath-Ali Shah Qajar.

After the death of Alexander Griboyedov, Russian diplomat in Tehran, by the hands of Iranian culprits, Khosrow Mirza was assigned by his father, Crown Prince Abbas Mirza, to an apology mission to the Russian Empire. In April 1829, the prince delivered Iran's apology to Tsar Nicholas I, and granted the Shah diamond to the Tsar. His travelogue details his travels and experiences in Russia. After his return to Iran, he was appointed as an advisor of his father Abbas Mirza, and as a financial advisor for Iran's Khorasan province.

After the death of Abbas Mirza in 1833, Khosrow Mirza's elder brother Mohammad Mirza became the crown prince, who would then inherit the throne from Fath-Ali Shah, their grandfather. As Abbas Mirza's favourite son, he posed the threat for the Shah and was imprisoned along with another of his brothers, Jahangir Mirza, in a castle in Ardabil on Mohammad Mirza's orders. In the first days of Mohammad Shah's reign, he blinded both of his brothers to prevent them from becoming pretenders to the throne. Khosrow Mirza was eventually released from the prison, and after spending his life with a number of his family in Hamadan, died on 21 October 1875.

== Early life ==
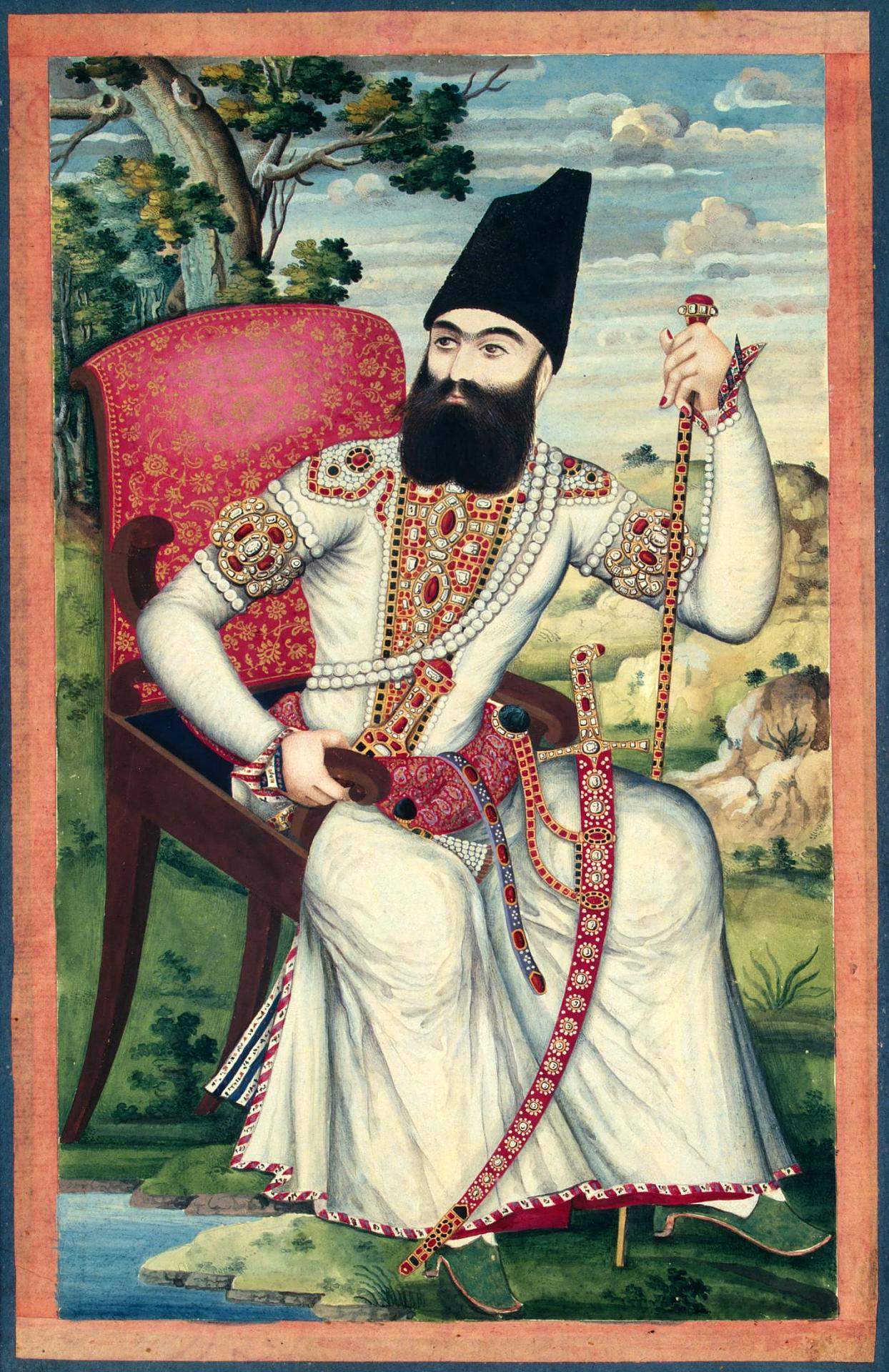
Portrait of Abbas Mirza (c. 1820s)

Prince Khosrow Mirza was born in early 1813 in the Shams ol-Emareh palace at Tabriz. His mother Khurde Khanum was a daughter of a Turkmen Bey. Khosrow Mirza spent his childhood with his mother and later with his three brothers Djahangir Mirza, Ahmad Mirza and Mostafa Gholi Mirza. He was Abbas Mirza's favourite son. Aged seven, Khosrow Mirza was entrusted to his uncle Hussein-Ali Bey; he was trained to ride and wield weapons. From the age of nine, Khosrow Mirza began to study Arabic and Azerbaijani languages, various sciences, the works of the great poets of the East and the princely etiquette. He was a fast learner and the ablest rider in his father's court.

In early 1826, Khosrow Mirza was enlisted to the guards battalion, a special battalion that was trained by British instructors. He fought in the Russo-Persian War of 1826-1828, witnessed major defeats of the Iranian army and was present in the peace negotiations. In July 1827, Alexander Griboyedov was sent to Abbas Mirza's camp near Tabriz, where he first met Khosrow Mirza. These negotiations were fruitless and the war continued until that October, when Lieutenant General Eristov captured Tabriz, the capital of the heir's province, and Abbas Mirza agreed to restart the peace negotiations. On 5 November 1827, Khosrow Mirza had a meeting with Count Ivan Paskevich. The count and the prince rode horses during a horse race and Khorsrow Mirza read Rumi poems for his guest. Paskevich liked Khosrow Mirza's "Noble behavior" and saw him as a "rightful prince". Abbas Mirza had deliberately send Khosrow Mirza to test his diplomatic abilities and, pleased with the results, appointed his son as the diplomatic secretary. On 8 February 1828, peace negotiations were resumed in the village Torkamanchay, where in the presence of Khosrow Mirza and his brother Djahangir Mirza, the Treaty of Turkmenchay was signed.

== The Persian mission ==
=== Griboyedov's death ===
On 6 October 1828, Alexander Griboyedov with his young wife Nino Chavchavadze and the whole board arrived in Tehran; the next day, Abbas Mirza wrote him a letter wishing him a good experience in Iran. Griboyedov was also greeted by Khosrow Mirza. In early January, Abbas Mirza wrote a letter to Count Paskevich to say he would like to travel to Saint Petersburg in February on a friendly visit to Tsar Nicholas I. Khosrow Mirza would accompany his father on this trip. Abbas Mirza's secretary Mirza Saleh arrived in Tiflis to see Paskevich on 7 February 1829 with this message and stayed there to wait for Abbas Mirza. Shortly after, however, a group of peasants attacked the Russian embassy and killed Griboyedov and most of his staff.

=== The trip ===
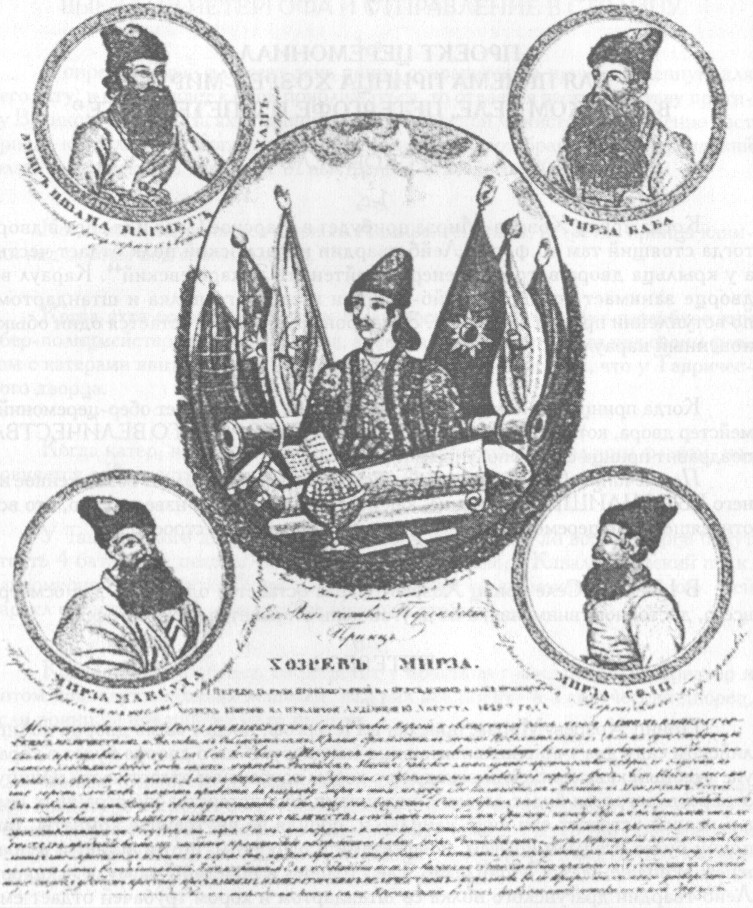
Khosrow Mirza and his group in a Russian newspaper report

Immediately after news of Griboyedov's death reached Tabriz, Abbas Mirza ordered Tabriz to be fortified in case of a war. Mindful of Khosrow Mirza's successful diplomatic negotiations with Count Paskevich, Fath-Ali Shah issued a firman to Abbas Mirza in which he ordered him to send a committee led by Khosrow Mirza to Saint Petersburg to apologize to the Tsar. Khosrow Mirza's mission was extremely important, not only for Iranian and Russian sides but for all participants in the Great Game, therefore, figures from both sides tried to execute this mission well. For example, Denis Davydov, who had been at Tabriz, lobbied the Tsar for a meeting with Khsorow Mirza, and enlisted the help of Count Paskevich to accomplish this goal.

Neither sides desire another war. Iran was devastated after their defeat, and the Russian army was encamped by the Ottoman border. An apology, quick and efficient, would put the affair into an end, which was exactly what Nicholas I wanted. Thus, in early April 1829, an acceptance letter with the Tsar's stamp reached Tabriz. Shortly after, a committee led by Khosrow Mirza accompanied with gifts left for Saint Petersburg. The committee included Mirza Mohammad Khan Zangana, Mirza Masoud Ansari Garmrudi, Mirza Saleh Shirazi, Hossein Ali Beg (Khosrow Mirza's uncle), Mirza Taqi Khan Farahani (future Amir Kabir), Mirza Baba Afshar, Fazel Khan Garrusi, Mohammad Hossein Khan, Magniago de Borea (Khosrow Mirza's French tutor) and Barthélémy Semino (a French military advisor).

The committee crossed the Aras River on 9 May and met Count Paskevich at Tiflis on 19 May. On 4 June, they left Tiflis and arrived in Moscow on 26 July. During the trip from Tiflis to Novgorod, they were joined by Count P. P. Sukhtelen and three translators, who were ordered to spy on Mirza. Once in Moscow, Khosrow Mirza visited Griboyedov's mother and shed tears with her. The people of Moscow admired him for this act. Mirza's group was housed at the Grand Kremlin Palace. During his time in Moscow, he visited attractions such as the Bolshoi Theater and Imperial Moscow University, and spoke to both scholars and commoners. Khosrow Mirza also met Nikolay Yusupov and had dinner with him. Yusupov found his inability to use knives and forks disrespectful, but still praised Khosrow Mirza and regarded him as the only Iranian prince who was deserving of a meeting with the Tsar.

On 11 August, the Persian committee arrived at Saint Petersburg and were housed at Tauride Palace. Khosrow Mirza visited Tsarskoye Selo, Peterhof Palace and the Winter Palace. He was welcomed by princes and princesses, and harangued for them. On 22 August, in an official ceremony, Khosrow Mirza read Fath-Ali Shah's letter for Tsar. Khosrow Mirza and his retinue were showered with gifts, including 12 state-of-the-art guns. Khosrow Mirza presented the Imperial family with gifts from the Shah, among which was a large 88.7-carat Shah Diamond, 20 precious manuscripts, two cashmere carpets, a pearl necklace for the Empress, a saber for the heir Alexander and jewelry for the Grand Princesses. Many of these gifts would arrive at St. Petersburg later, for they were not ready when the committee departed from Iran. Khosrow Mirza's natural wit and diplomatic experience made him extremely popular in the Russian court. He managed to reduce Iran's indemnity payment during his stay. Khosrow Mirza and his group left Saint Petersburg on 27 February 1830 returned to Tabriz on 15 March 1830. They were gloriously welcomed by Abbas Mirza.

=== The travelogue ===
Equestrian portrait by Edward Casper Hauser, 1829

Khosrow Mirza's travelogue to Saint Petersburg was written by Mirza Masoud's secretary Mirza Mustafa Afshar, who was with Khosrow Mirza throughout the trip. The book originally had six chapters but the final chapter has been lost. In the travelogue, there is a detailed report of the Iranian's opinion of the Russian factories, modern industries, balloons, lithography, museums, greenhouses, taxidermy, and much more. The author praises the Russian's technological progress and regrets the Iranians are deprived of these fields. He also suggests sending students from Iran to Russia and France to study the sciences.

He also compared the Russian treasury, which was based on the circulation of assets in the country's economic flow, to the traditional Iranian method of collecting taxes and revenues in the treasury. He also reported on the construction of a community church and the erection of its large columns with the help of cranes, and was amazed to see lithography and balloon flights. Other industries and inventions mentioned include theaters, academies, bladesmithing, glass production, thermometers, museums, and more.

He also mentions political details such as the borders of the Russian Empire, the occupations of the country, the number and characteristics of its citizens, and the products and animals of Russia. It is also the first work during the Qajar era that mentions Alaska, which he considers to be part of Russia. According to Ekhtiar, Mirza Taqi Khan Farahani, who was present on the trip, saw all of developments and after reading Mirza Mostafa's report, he was inspired to build Dar ul-Funun polytechnic.

== Later life ==
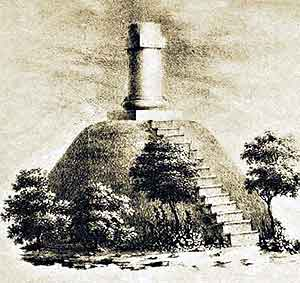
Khosrow Mirza's monument

Khosrow Mirza's success made him a firm contender for the throne, and both his father and grandfather placed him against his brother Mohammad Mirza. Though there was initially little rivalry between the two brothers, in 1831, Fath-Ali Shah granted Governorship of Kerman to Khosrow Mirza and Abbas Mirza made him his advisor. According to Nafisi, Mohammad Mirza developed a grudge against Khosrow Mirza out of fear of losing his chance to rule. After Abbas Mirza's death in 1833 and the illness of Fath-Ali Shah in 1834, Mohammad Mirza was granted a chance to remove Khosrow Mirza and his brother Djahangir Mirza from the line of succession. On Mohammad Mirza's order, Khosrow Mirza and Djahangir Mirza were imprisoned in a castle in Ardabil. Count Ivan Simonich, the new envoy, wanted to ensure Article VII of the Treaty of Turkmenchay was observed so he approved the succession of Mohammad Mirza. Khosrow Mirza, who had no desire for the crown, hoped the Tsar would release him from prison. With the death of Fath-Ali Shah and the coronation of Mohammad Shah, both brothers were blinded.

In 1835, after the death of Qa'em-Maqam and replacement of Haji Mirza Aqasi, Khosrow Mirza was freed and with the support of new prime minister, became the Royal Finance Administer. He was moved to the vicinity of Hamadan. Khosrow Mirza later fought in the Siege of Herat and recorded all of casualties of war. He died at the age of 62 in Hamadan on 21 October 1875.

== Appearance and skills ==
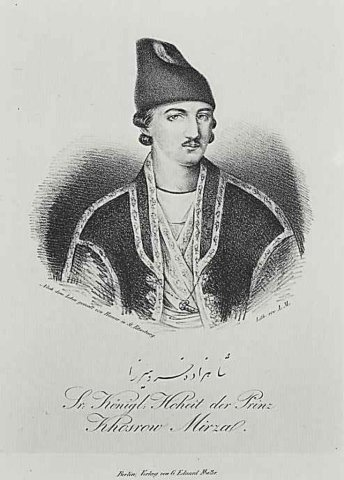
Khosrow Mirza by Adolph Menzel

According to Bournoutian; "During his stay [In Russia], [Khosrow Mirza] often visited Theaters – Russian and French – which in those days were full of the audience, eager to see their beloved guest; his happy physiognomy drew the attention of even the mob; the crowd always stood in front of the house where he was staying, and when he left he was accompanied by a run somewhere."

When Khosrow Mirza was 16 years old; according to contemporaries, he "was of average height, slender, had charming eyes and an unusually pleasant smile; possessed liveliness in conversation, and was remarkably affable in handling".

== In popular culture ==
- Khosow Mirza is shown as a colorful character in Nikolai Gogol's short story "The Nose" and in the opera "The Nose" by Dmitri Shostakovich, which is based on it.
- Khosrow Mirza's speech to the Tsar was recreated in the 2002 film "Russian Ark".
- The 1977 Iranian television series "Khosrow Mirza II" is based on a story about his descendants.

== Bibliography ==
- Afshar Far, Naser (2003). سرگذشت فتحعلی شاه [Life of Fath-Ali Shah] (in Persian). Tehran: Ahl-e-Qalam Publications. ISBN 9789645568489. OCLC 145133976.
- Andreev, A. Yu (2010). GRIBOEDOV Alexander Sergeevich. Moscow: ROSSPEN. ISBN 9785824314298.
- Balilan Asl, Lida (2012). "A study of the spatial structure of the city of Tabriz in the Qajar period with reference to the evolution of historical maps in this period". Journal of History of Iran after Islam. 8: 10–40.
- Belyakova, Zoia (1994). Grand Duchess Maria Nikolayevna and Her Palace in St. Petersburg. Hazar Publishing. ISBN 9781874371540.
- Bournoutian, George (2014). From Tabriz to St. Petersburg: Iran's Mission of Apology to Russia in 1829. Costa Mesa: Mazda Publishers. ISBN 9781568593289.
- Bournoutian, George (2015). "ḴOSROW MIRZĀ QĀJĀR". Encyclopædia Iranica, online edition. New York.
- Boyko, S. A. (2003), Persian Embassy in 1829, Moscow, Russia
- Busse, H. (1982). "ʿABBĀS MĪRZĀ QAJAR". Encyclopædia Iranica, online edition. New York.
- Ekhtiar, Maryam Dorreh (1994). The Dar al-Funun: Educational reform and cultural development in Qajar Iran. New York: Dissertation Abstracts. OCLC 873965340.
- Hopkirk, Peter (1980). The Great Game. New York: John Murray. ISBN 978-1-56836-022-5.
- Markelov, N. (2001), "Persian Prince Khosrow Mirza in Russia", Moscow magazine, Moscow, Russia (published 1 March 2001)
- Melville, Firuza (2013). "Khosrow Mirza's mission to Saint Petersburg in 1829". In Cronin, Stephanie (ed.). Iranian-Russian Encounters, Empires and Revolutions since 1800. Routledge. pp. 69–95. ISBN 9781138832268.
- Nafisi, Saeed (1963). Social and Political History of Iran in the Contemporary Period: From the Beginning of the Qajar dynasty to the End of Fath Ali Shah. Tehran: University of Tehran Press. ISBN 9786009387311. OCLC 1192488671.
- Rahnemai Shahsevari, Naser (2014). Tabriz in the era of Abbas Mirza. Tabriz. ISBN 9786008188186.
- Seyed Mohammadi, Seyed Morteza (1999). History of Iranian Cinema and Television 1930-1998. Tehran: Simro Publications. ISBN 964-5685-35-4.
