= 1852 in Iran =

- Decades
- See also: Other events of 1852; Years in Iran

The following lists events that happened during 1852 in Qajar era.

== Incumbents ==
- Monarch: Naser al-Din Shah Qajar

== Births ==
- ? – Rahimkhan Chalabianloo, Iranian politician.

== Deaths ==
- February 9 – Mirza Mohammad-Ali Khan Shirazi, Iranian politician.
- August 27 – Táhirih, influential poet and theologian of the Bábí faith in Iran.
- ? – Fazel Khan Garrusi, Iranian poet and secretary.
