= Zayn al-Abidin Shirvani =

Iranian philosopher (1779–1837)

- Born: 1779 Shamakhi, Shirvan Khanate, Zand Iran
- Died: 1837 (aged 57–58) Mecca, Ottoman Empire (present-day Saudi Arabia)
- Notable works: Bostan al-siaha

Zayn al-Abidin Shirvani (Persian: زین‌العابدین شیروانی; 1779/80—1837), was an Iranian scholar, mystic, and traveler, who composed the geography book Bostan al-siaha.

== Biography ==
Born in Shamakhi in the Shirvan region, Shirvani belonged to a Shia Muslim family. The region was then ruled by the Shirvan Khanate, a dependency of Zand Iran. At the age of five, Shirvani went to the city of Karbala along with his father Mulla Iskandar, where he studied for twelve years. It was there that Shirvani met the Ni'matullahi masters Ma'sum Ali Shah Dakani and Nur-Ali Shah Isfahani. When Shirvani returned to Iran in 1814, he attempted to find a home in several places, ultimately settling in city of Shiraz. He later died in 1837 during a pilgrimage to the city of Mecca.

Amongst the disciples of Shirvani was Reza-Qoli Khan Hedayat (died 1871), a literary historian, administrator, and poet.

Shirvani is notable for writing about the concept of Iran. Writing in 1813, he says that "from time immemorial" the lands of Iran reached from the Euphrates to the Jayhun (Amu Darya), and from Darband to the coast of Oman. Although Shirvani was not a nationalist, he showed his attachment to the ahl-i Furs (people of Persia), claiming that they were "a magnificent clan" who in "terms of intellect and aptitude are free of want from the people of the inhabited quarter of the world."

== Sources ==
- Bournoutian, George (2016). The 1820 Russian Survey of the Khanate of Shirvan: A Primary Source on the Demography and Economy of an Iranian Province prior to its Annexation by Russia. Gibb Memorial Trust. ISBN 978-1909724808.
- Bournoutian, George (2021). From the Kur to the Aras: A Military History of Russia's Move into the South Caucasus and the First Russo-Iranian War, 1801–1813. Brill. ISBN 978-9004445154.
- Kashani-Sabet, Firoozeh (2014). Frontier Fictions: Shaping the Iranian Nation, 1804–1946. Princeton University Press. ISBN 978-1850432708.
- Losensky, Paul E. (2003). "Hedayat, Reżāqoli Khan". In Yarshater, Ehsan (ed.). Encyclopædia Iranica. Vol. XII/2: Hedāyat al-mota'allemin–Herat VII. London and New York: Routledge & Kegan Paul. pp. 119–121. ISBN 978-0-933273-75-7.
- Richard, Y. (2002). "Zayn al- ʿĀbidīn S̲h̲īrwānī". In Bearman, P. J.; Bianquis, Th.; Bosworth, C. E.; van Donzel, E. & Heinrichs, W. P. (eds.). The Encyclopaedia of Islam, Second Edition. Volume XI: W–Z. Leiden: E. J. Brill. p. 484. ISBN 978-90-04-12756-2.
- Sirjani, Ali-Akbar Sa'idi (2020). "Bostān al-sīāḥa". Encyclopaedia Iranica Online. Brill. doi:10.1163/2330-4804_EIRO_COM_7099.
