= Vaqaye-e Ettefaqiyeh =

Newspaper in Qajar Iran

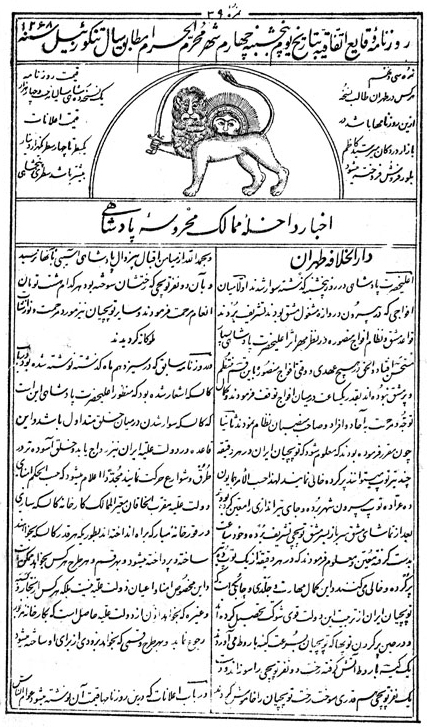
First page of the fourth issue of the newspaper

Vaqaye-e Ettefaqiyeh (Persian: وقایع اتفاقیه) was a weekly published newspaper in Qajar Iran. It was the second Persian-language newspaper in Iran and the third, after Kaghaz-e Akhbar and Zahriri de bohra, newspaper to be published in Iran.

Its first issue was published on 7 February 1851 on the orders of Amir Kabir and was printed by lithography.

== See also ==
- History of newspaper publishing in Iran
