= Mirza Saleh Shirazi =

Iranian court translator and diplomat

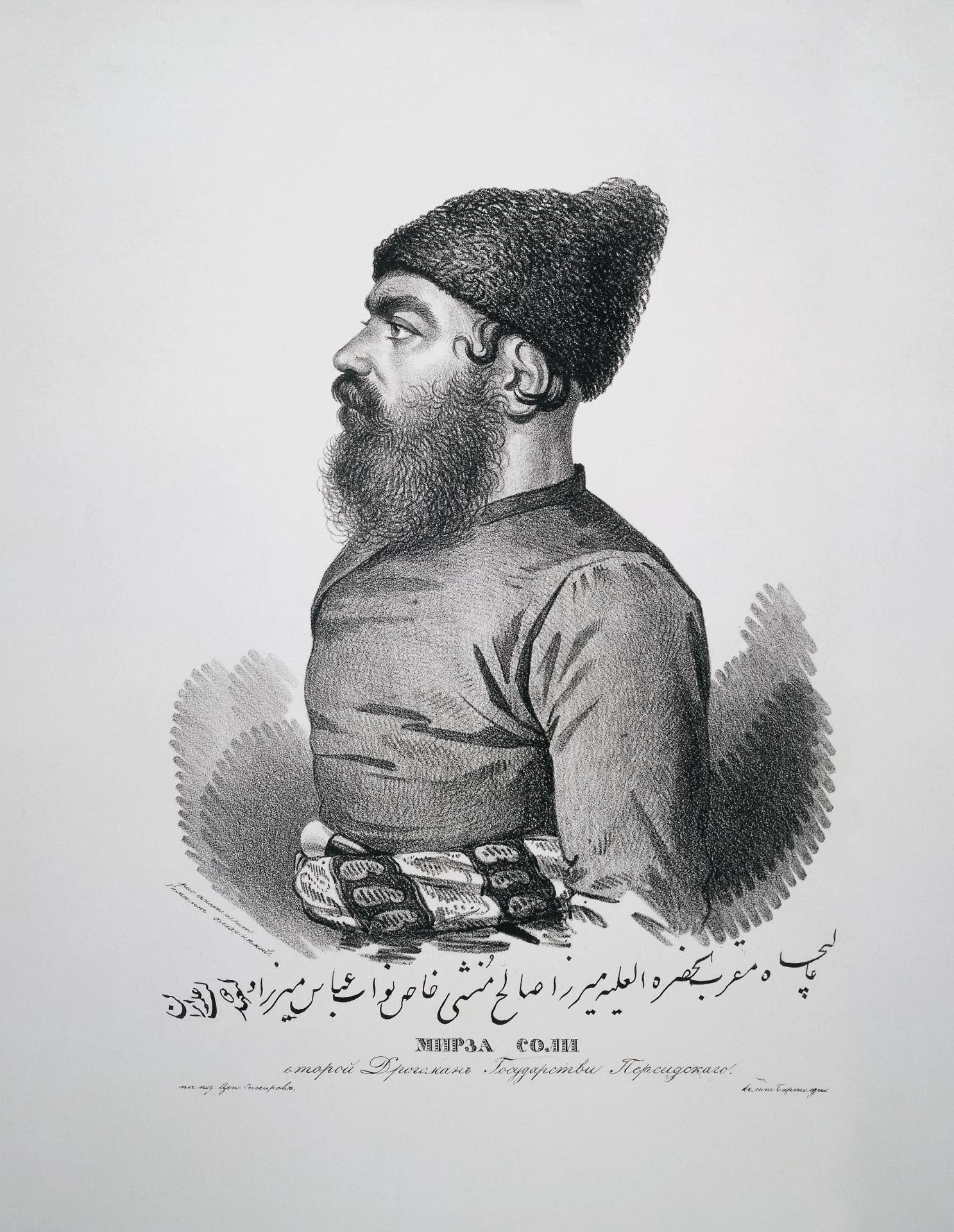
- Portrait of Mirza Saleh Shirazi by Karl Hampeln, dated 1829
- Born: c. 1790; Kazerun, Zand Iran
- Died: c. 1845; Qajar Iran
- Known for: Publishing the first newspaper in Iran
- Notable work: Safarnameh

Mirza Saleh Shirāzi (Persian: میرزا صالح شیرازی; c. 1790 – c. 1845) was an Iranian court translator and diplomat, who published the first newspaper in Iran in 1837, the Kaghaz-e Akhbar (lit. "paper of news").

The son of a merchant, Mirza Saleh spent his early career in Tabriz, where he worked for the Iranian crown prince Abbas Mirza and his vizier Mirza Bozorg Qa'em-Maqam. Mirza Saleh was one of five courtiers of Abbas Mirza who earned scholarships and went to London between 1815 and 1819 under the direction of Colonel Joseph D'Arcy. When Mirza Saleh returned to Iran, Abbas Mirza appointed him as his translator. Because of his familiarity with Europe, he was used by Abbas Mirza as a companion and adviser in foreign political matters as well as a point of contact for European missionaries in Iran. As a part of numerous political delegations, Mirza Saleh was also frequently dispatched abroad. He was appointed as a diplomat to Great Britain in 1822.

Mirza Saleh was part of the faction that opposed another war with Russia, fearing the comparatively superior capability of the Russian Empire, and wanted armed conflict to be avoided at all costs. However, the faction that advocated for war prevailed, leading to the second Russo-Iranian War in 1826. The Iranians lost the war, and were forced to sign the Treaty of Turkmenchay on 28 February 1828, in which they agreed to cede Erivan and Nakhichevan. Mirza Saleh was amongst the figures who participated in the treaty negotiations on behalf of Iran.

Under Mohammad Shah Qajar (r. 1834–1848), Mirza Saleh served as the mostowfi-ye nezam (state accountant).

== Biography ==
=== Background and early career ===
The son of a merchant named Hajj Baqer Khan Kazeruni, Mirza Saleh Shirazi was born in the city of Kazerun in c. 1790. He most likely grew up in the nearby city of Shiraz, as he is referred to as "Shirazi". Later, he relocated to the city of Tabriz, where he worked for the Iranian crown prince Abbas Mirza and his vizier Mirza Bozorg Qa'em-Maqam. Mirza Saleh served as Henry Lindsay Bethune's secretary from 1810 to 1813 as he served as the infantry commander of Abbas Mirza's new prototype army. Additionally, Mirza Saleh helped the British ambassador Gore Ouseley and Orientalist William Price explore Iran. Mirza Saleh wrote a series of dialogues in Persian at Price's request, which the latter then translated into English in his Grammar of three principle Oriental languages. Mirza Saleh learned up some English from his regular exchanges with British diplomats and officers.

=== Education in England ===
Mirza Saleh was one of five courtiers of Abbas Mirza who earned scholarships and went to London between 1815 and 1819 under the direction of Colonel Joseph D'Arcy. Their journey to England, referred to as a wanderjahren by the modern historian Nile Green, was an interchange of ideas, which had been made by possible by the diplomatic exchanges between Iran and Great Britain. Although Abbas Mirza was hesitant to allow Mirza Saleh to travel with the delegation, D'Arcy selected Mirza Saleh for a scholarship after learning that he was eager to study in England. Mirza Saleh applied for permission to study European languages, literature, and philosophy, in contrast to the other four courtiers who were anticipated to obtain degrees in technical fields.

Soon after arriving in England, Mirza Saleh understood that he needed to learn how to behave like an English gentleman in order to be accepted into the exclusive social circles of higher learning. Because of this, he started dressing in an English attire and attended the Reverend John Bisset's "gentlemen's academy" in the tiny town of Croydon to study. He studied Latin, French, and, to some extent, Anglican doctrine, particularly the popular writings of William Paley, and he also improved his English. The printing industry attracted Mirza Saleh's curiosity. He worked as a London printer's apprentice before returning to Iran in 1819, and with the support of Richard Watts, he was able to buy a printing machine that was brought to Iran.

=== Return to Iran and later career ===
Having returned to Iran, the goal of Mirza Saleh and the other students were to use their new knowledge to change Iran both internally and its relations with its neighbours. Their newly acquired information from outside was transferred into Iranian society: one of them, Jafar Khan, became the nation's chief engineer and in 1847 published the Khulasat al-Hisab, a mathematics textbook, while another named Mirza Reza authored a Persian history of the French military commander and political leader Napoleon. Abbas Mirza appointed Mirza Saleh as his translator. Because of his familiarity with Europe, he was used by Abbas Mirza as a companion and adviser in foreign political matters as well as a point of contact for European missionaries in Iran. As a part of numerous political delegations, Mirza Saleh was also frequently dispatched abroad. He was appointed as a diplomat to Great Britain in 1822.

In early 1825, the northern bank of Lake Gokcha, which the Iranians believed to be a part of their realm, was seized by the Russians under the orders of Aleksey Petrovich Yermolov, the governor of Georgia. The Russian army soon advanced further, capturing Balagh-lu as well. In Fath-Ali Shah's court, two factions had developed during the course of building policy toward Russia. One faction advocated for peace with Russia, and the other for war. Both were heavily lobbying Fath-Ali Shah and Abbas Mirza. The first question at hand was what to do if Russia did not stop their occupation of Gokcha and Balagh-lu. The state of the Muslim minority under Russian authority and, lastly, whether and to what extent Russia had been weakened as a result of its internal crises, were secondary concerns.

Mirza Saleh was amongst those who advocated for peace, alongside other prominent figures such as the chief scribe Neshat Isfahani; the head of the royal office Manuchehr Khan Gorji; and the foreign minister Mirza Abolhassan Khan Ilchi. In general, the peace party feared the capability of the Russian Empire and wanted armed conflict to be avoided at all costs. They were more accustomed to dealing with people from other cultures and knew more about Russia. To advise Fath-Ali Shah and formulate a course of action in this matter, the Council of Soltaniyeh gathered and finally resolved to launch full-scale warfare. Because of uncontrollable circumstances, the peace party at the shah's court was outmanoeuvred. In the summer of 1826, full-scale war erupted between Iran and Russia. The Iranians eventually lost, and were thus forced to sign the Treaty of Turkmenchay on 28 February 1828, in which they agreed to cede Erivan and Nakhichevan. Mirza Saleh was amongst the figures who participated in the treaty negotiations on behalf of Iran.

In 1829, following the murder of the Russian ambassador to Iran, Alexander Griboyedov, Mirza Saleh was selected to travel to Saint Petersburg with Prince Khosrow Mirza to offer an official apology. Under Mohammad Shah Qajar (r. 1834–1848), Mirza Saleh served as the mostowfi-ye nezam (state accountant). Using a press and other supplies brought from Russia, Mirza Saleh also founded a lithographic printing firm in Tabriz. Using the printing machinery he had brought from England in 1819, he published the first newspaper in Iran in 1837, the Kaghaz-e Akhbar (lit. "paper of news").

Mirza Saleh died in c. 1845 in Iran.

== Sources ==
- Behrooz, Maziar (2023). Iran at War: Interactions with the Modern World and the Struggle with Imperial Russia. I.B. Tauris. ISBN 978-0755637379.
- Sohrabi, Naghmeh (2012). Taken for Wonder: Nineteenth-Century Travel Accounts from Iran to Europe. Oxford University Press. ISBN 978-0199829705.
- Faridzadeh, Sara (2023a). "Mīrzā Ṣāliḥ Shīrāzī". Christian-Muslim Relations. A Bibliographical History Volume 20. Iran, Afghanistan and the Caucasus (1800-1914). Brill.
- Faridzadeh, Sara (2023b). "Safarnāma". Christian-Muslim Relations. A Bibliographical History Volume 20. Iran, Afghanistan and the Caucasus (1800-1914). Brill.
- Green, Nile (2009a). "Among the dissenters: reciprocal ethnography in nineteenth-century Inglistan". Journal of Global History. 4 (2). Cambridge University Press: 293–315. doi:10.1017/S1740022809003167.
- Green, Nile (2009b). "Journeymen, Middlemen: Travel, Transculture, and Technology in the Origins of Muslim Printing". International Journal of Middle East Studies. 41 (2). Cambridge University Press: 203–224. JSTOR 40206102.
- Pourjavady, Reza (2023). "Russo-Iranian wars 1804-13 and 1826-8". Christian-Muslim Relations. A Bibliographical History Volume 20. Iran, Afghanistan and the Caucasus (1800-1914). Brill.
