= Abdollah Mirza Qajar =

Iranian photographer (1850–1912)

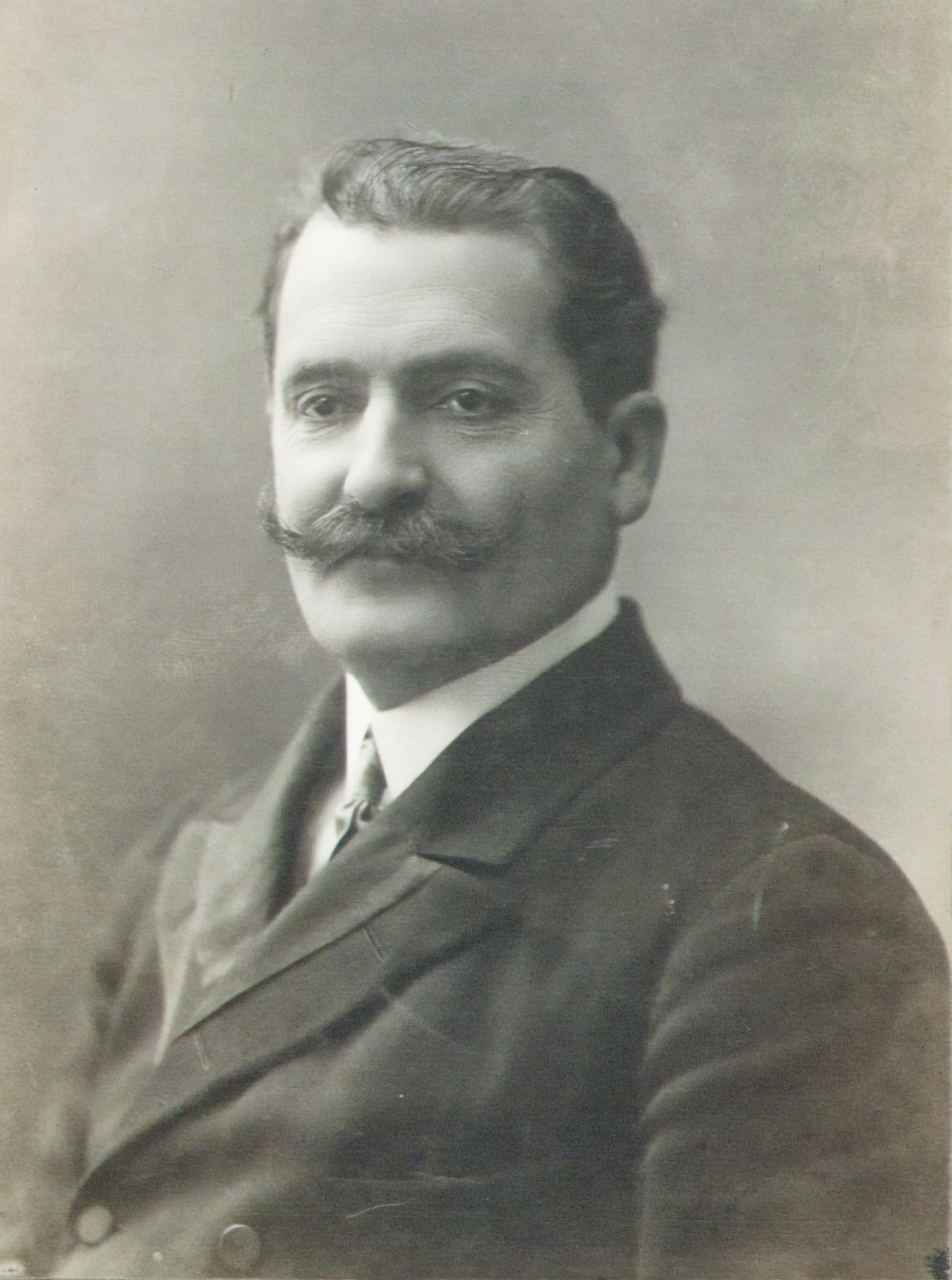
- Photograph of Abdollah Mirza Qajar
- Born: 1850; Qajar Iran
- Died: 1912 (aged 61–62); Tehran, Qajar Iran
- Dynasty: Qajar
- Father: Jahangir Mirza Qajar
- Religion: Twelver Shia Islam
- Occupation: Photography
- Education: Dar al-Fonun

Abdollah Mirza Qajar (Persian: عبدالله میرزا قاجار; 1850 – 1912) was an Iranian photographer from the Qajar dynasty. He was the son of Jahangir Mirza Qajar. He was closely associated with the Dar al-Fonun college, where he graduated, and was appointed as its teacher of photography in 1883. From then until 1896, Naser al-Din Shah and his close companion, Mirza Ali Asghar Khan Amin al-Soltan, often assigned Abdollah Mirza on journeys devoted to photography.

Abdollah Mirza Qajar died in 1912 in Tehran.

== Sources ==
- Helbig, Elahe (2017). "Geographies Traced and Histories Told: Photographic Documentation of Land and People by ʿAbdollah Mirza Qajar, 1880s–1890s". In Markus Ritter; Scheiwiller, Staci G. (eds.). The Indigenous Lens?: Early Photography in the Near and Middle East. De Gruyter. pp. 79–110. ISBN 978-0300112542.
