= Kaghaz-e Akhbar =

Iranian newspaper

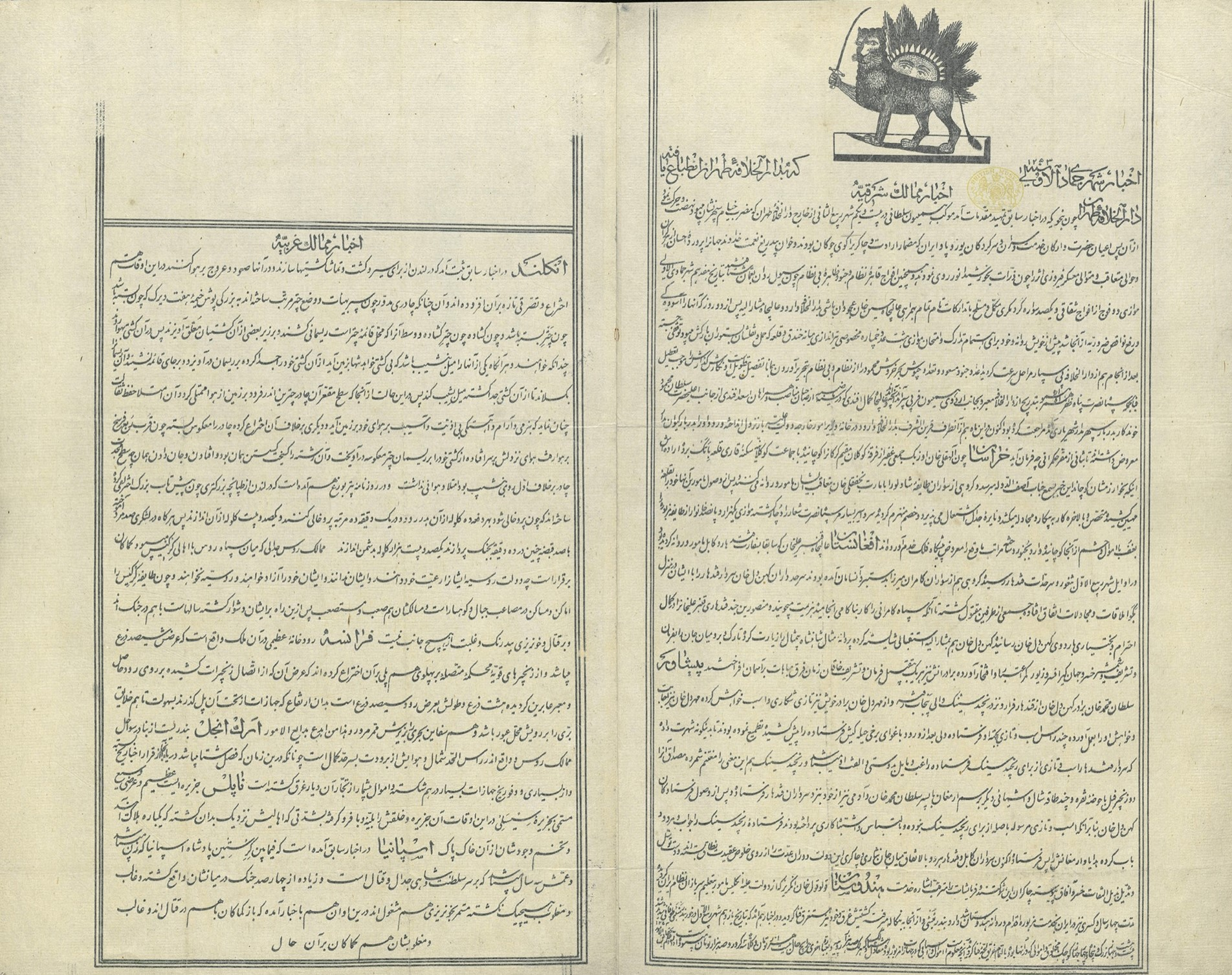
- The Jumada al-Ula 1253 (3 August 1837 – 1 September 1837) issue of Kaghaz-e Akhbar
- Type: Monthly newspaper
- Founder(s): Mirza Saleh Shirazi
- Founded: 1 May 1837
- Language: Persian
- City: Tehran

Kaghaz-e Akhbar (Persian: کاغذ اخبار; lit. "paper of news") was a monthly newspaper published in Qajar Iran.

Publishing its first issue on 1 May 1837, it was the first newspaper to be published in Iran.

The newspaper's creation was ordered by Mohammad Shah Qajar and was directed by Mirza Saleh Shirazi in Tehran. It did not have a specific name and was a direct translation of the English word "newspaper" into Persian. The first issue included news such as the actions of the Shah, the defeating of the Turkmen Gokalan and Yomut tribes and forced migration of their women and children to the Iranian capital of Tehran.

Although the newspaper was published every month without an interruption for at least three years, only a few scattered copies remain, with only two copies held in the British library.

== See also ==
- History of newspaper publishing in Iran
- Mirat-ul-Akhbar, the first newspaper published in the Persian language in India
