= Abol-Qasem Qa'em-Maqam =

Iranian official and prose writer

Abol-Qasem Qa'em-Maqam ابوالقاسم قائم‌مقام
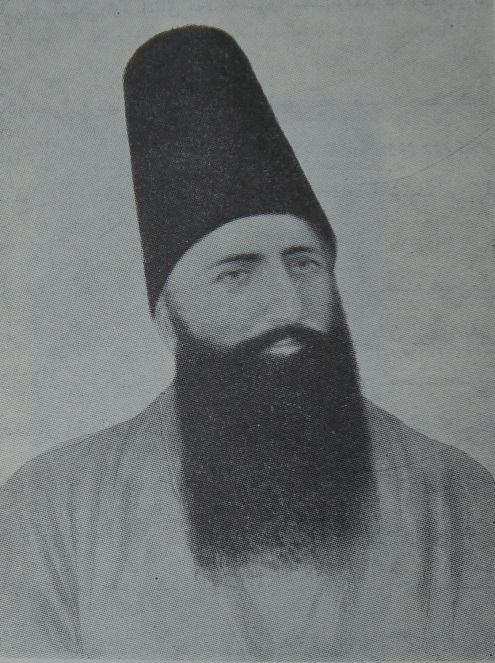

Prime Minister of Qajar Iran
- In office 1834–1835
- Monarch: Mohammad Shah Qajar
- Preceded by: Abdollah Khan Amin ol-Dowleh
- Succeeded by: Haji Mirza Aqasi

Personal details
- Born: 1779 Tehran, Zand Iran
- Died: 26 June 1835 (aged 56) Tehran, Qajar Iran
- Parent: Mirza Bozorg Qa'em-Maqam (father)

Mirza Abol-Qasem Qa'em-Maqam Farahani (also spelled Qa'im Maqam; Persian: میرزا ابوالقاسم قائم‌مقام فراهانی; 1779 – 1835), also known as Qa'em-Maqam II, was an Iranian official and prose writer, who played a central role in Iranian politics in the first half of the 19th century, as well as in Persian literature.

Belonging to a family of bureaucrats from Farahan, Abol-Qasem was the son of Mirza Bozorg Qa'em-Maqam (died 1821), a leading statesmen under the Qajars, who served as the minister of the crown prince Abbas Mirza. After the death of his father, Abol-Qasem inherited his titles and offices. He accompanied Abbas Mirza in his wars and was the architect behind his attempted reforms. Abol-Qasem also engaged in the diplomatic affairs of Iran, being part of the negotiations that led to the Treaty of Erzurum with the Ottomans, and the Treaty of Turkmenchay with the Russians.

He served as the grand vizier of the Qajar king (shah) Mohammad Shah Qajar (r. 1834–1848) from 1834 to 1835.

== Background ==
Abol-Qasem was born in 1779 in the city of Tehran to a family of bureaucrats. He was the son of Mirza Isa Farahani (better known as Mirza Bozorg Qa'em-Maqam), a former official of the Zand rulers and one of the leading statesmen under the Qajars. The family was native to Farahan in central Iran, a region notable for its high literacy and proficiency in statesmanship. From an early age, Abol-Qasem showed his skill in poetry, writing qasidas under the pen name of Thana'i.

"Qa'em-Maqam" (lit. adjutant or deputy) was a honorific title first received by Mirza Bozorg when he was appointed deputy of the grand vizier Mirza Shafi Mazandarani (died 1819) in 1809/10, which Abol-Qasem inherited after his father's death.

== Life ==
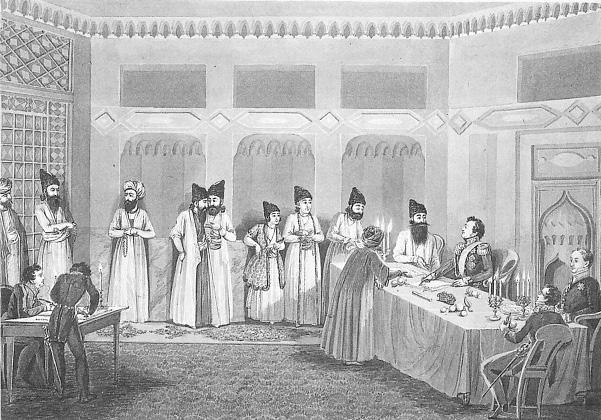
Signing of the Treaty of Turkmenchay by Karl Petrovich Beggrov, 1828

After the death of his father in 1821, Abol-Qasem succeeded him as the minister of the crown prince Abbas Mirza (died 1833), whose broad-minded and progressive outlook appealed to Abol-Qasem. Serving the crown prince with much loyalty and determination, Abol-Qasem accompanied Abbas Mirza in his wars and was the architect behind his attempted reforms. In 1823, Abol-Qasem played a part in negotiating a peace treaty with the Ottoman Empire, leading to the Treaty of Erzurum. Later in the same year, Abol-Qasem was compelled to retire due to suspicions of friendship with the Russian Empire. He was later restored to his former position in 1825, but soon fell out of favour with shah (king) Fath-Ali Shah Qajar (r. 1797–1834) due to his opposition against a war with Russia. As a result, Abol-Qasem was exiled in Mashhad during the entirety of the Russo-Persian War of 1826–1828. He was eventually reinstated once again and assigned to negotiate a peace treaty with Russia, who had inflicted a crushing defeat on the Iranians during the war, occupying parts of the Caucasus and most of Azerbaijan (including its provincial capital Tabriz).

The almost total annihilation of the Iranian army and the taxing Russian demands caused further difficulties to Fath-Ali Shah and Abbas Mirza. Ali Mirza Shaja ol-Saltaneh, a son of Fath-Ali Shah and governor-general of Khorasan, took advantage of the situation by forcing his father to acknowledge him as the new crown prince, albeit this lasted briefly. This made Abbas Mirza and Abol-Qasem speed up the peace negotiations with Russia, leading to the Treaty of Turkmenchay. Most of Russia's demands were accepted, which included the cession of the Iranian provinces Iravan, Nakhjavan and Talesh. Another term in the treaty was that Abbas Mirza was to become the indisputably legitimate heir to the Iranian throne. During the negotiations, Abol-Qasem had been determined to recover as much land as possibly, even agreeing to financially reimburse the Russians in order to keep Azerbaijan. The Iranian defeat changed Abol-Qasem's outlook on the Russians, as demonstrated in one of his qasidehs, where he regrets the change of Iran's fortune. He had now acknowledged that it was no longer the Iranians who were the superior force in the region but the Russians.

In the same year, Fath-Ali Shah appointed Abol-Qasem as the atabak-e azam (the principal tutor or guardian) of one his favourite sons, Farrokh-Siyar Mirza. The Qajars had most likely been acquainted with this former Safavid office through statesmen such as the Qa'em-Maqam family. The works of Abol-Qasem indicate that he saw the Persian vizier of the Seljuk Empire, Nizam al-Mulk (died 1092) as his rolemodel during his term as atabak-e azam and later grand vizier. In 1833, Abbas Mirza died, which led to his eldest son Mohammad Mirza being declared the new heir to the throne. In 1834, Abol-Qasem was assigned to lead the besiegement of the Afghan city of Herat. After the death of Fath-Ali Shah later in the same year, Abol-Qasem assured Mohammad Mirza's (who became known as Mohammad Shah Qajar) accession to the throne.

In order to secure Mohammad Shah's accession, Abol-Qasem had five of his brothers jailed in the city of Ardabil. A few months later, Abol-Qasem had the brothers Khosrow Mirza and Jahangir Mirza blinded due to suspicions of plotting against the shah. Abol-Qasem became the first grand vizier of Mohammad Shah, but he had already started to gain additional adversaries as well lose his influence. He was already disliked by the British and Russian legations due to his opposition to foreign and domestic pressure, and by the Davalu faction of the Qajars for his policy of centralization. Through the instigation of Mohammad Shah's tutor Haji Mirza Aqasi (died 1849), the shah had Abol-Qasem strangled in the crypt of the Negarestan palace of Tehran on 26 June 1835. Aqasi was subsequently made the new grand vizier.

The founder and editor of the weekly newspaper Adab ("Culture"), Adib al-Mamalek Farahani (died 1917), was a descendant of Abol-Qasem through both his parents.

== Literary career ==
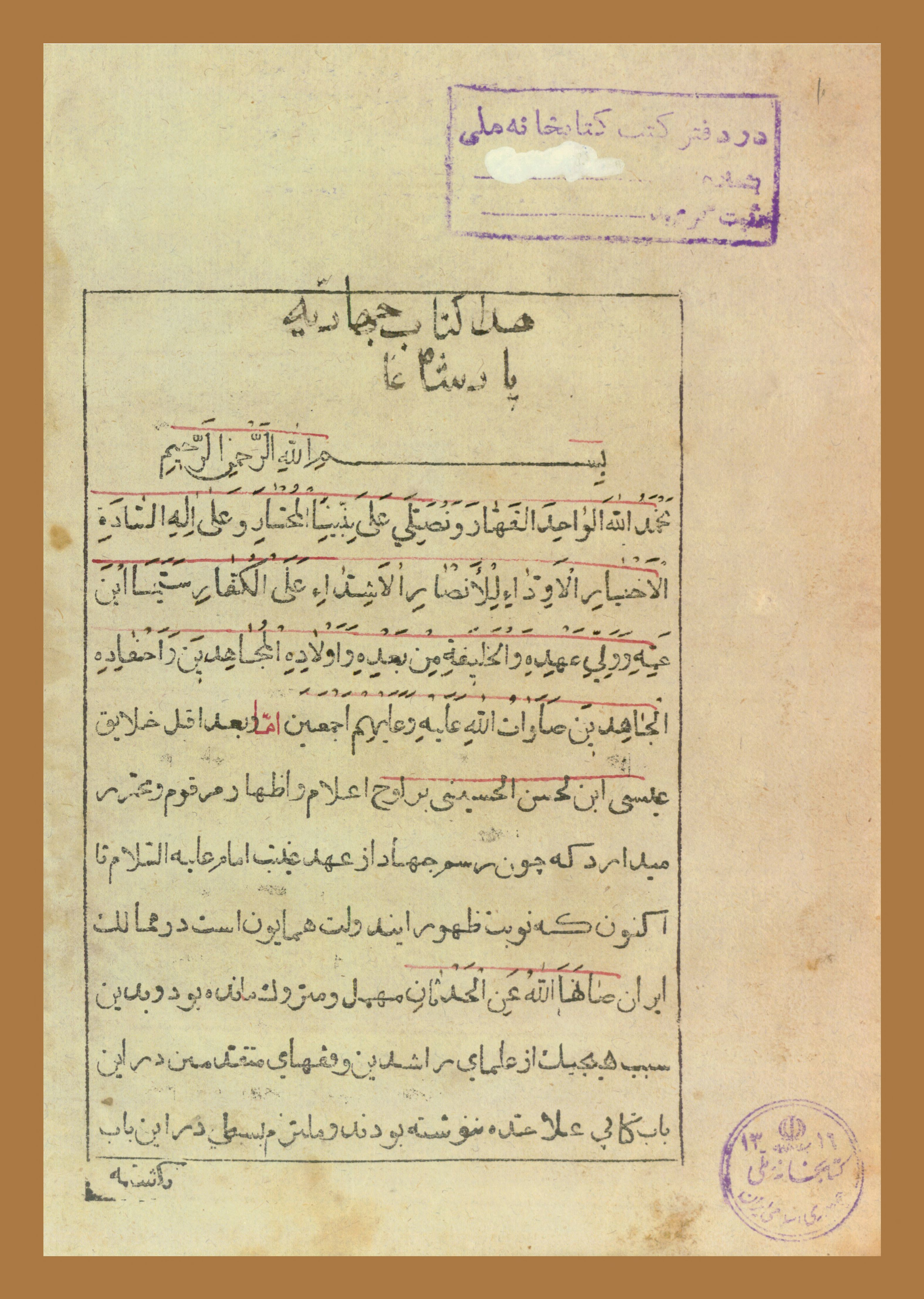
1817 manuscript of Qa'em-Maqam's Jehadiyeh ("Treatise on holy war"). Written in Persian and printed in Tabriz, the book covers all the fatwas ("decrees") that the religious leaders of Iran had issued about the necessity of performing jehad (holy war) against the Russians during their invasion of Iranian territory amidst the 1804-1813 War

Abol-Qasem was a prominent prose-writer, with his most notable works being his divan, Shir Qa'em-Maqam, and the Monsha'at Qa'em-Maqam. The concept of the Guarded Domains of Iran developed a new political meaning during the Russo-Persian Wars, when it was adopted as a practical means of demanding the defense of Iranian territory against foreign invasion. In Tabriz, a book compiled from a fatwa on jihad, authored by two distinguished Shia jurists from Iraq, includes an introduction where Abol-Qasem emphasized the importance of jihad. He argued that it was a collective religious duty to counter the "disorder brought by the Russian nation within the Guarded Domain."

In order to create prose that resembled a political slogan and acted as a encouragement to defend Iran, Abol-Qasem experimented with words that rhymed with mahrus. The threat posed by Russia (Rus) to the Qajar domains was considered ominous (manhus). This threat jeopardized not only the territorial integrity of the Qajars but also their honor (namus).

== Legacy and assessment ==
Abol-Qasem is viewed in a positive light in both contemporary and modern historiography. The Scottish traveler and writer James Baillie Fraser (died 1856) refers to him as "a true Persian diplomatist, acute and far-sighted". The Czech orientalist Jan Rypka (died 1968) calls him an "uncommonly intelligent young man", as well as "incorruptible, noble and loyal."

The distinguished and progressive politician Amir Kabir (died 1852) entered government service through the patronage of Abol-Qasem, who had trained him.

== Sources ==
- Algar, H. (1989). "Amīr Kabīr". In Yarshater, Ehsan (ed.). Encyclopædia Iranica. Vol. III: Ātaš–Bayhaqī, Ẓahīr-al-Dīn. London and New York: Routledge & Kegan Paul. pp. 959–963. ISBN 978-0-71009-121-5.
- Amanat, Abbas (1997). Pivot of the Universe: Nasir Al-Din Shah Qajar and the Iranian Monarchy, 1831-1896. I.B.Tauris. ISBN 978-1845118280.
- Amanat, Abbas (2017). Iran: A Modern History. Yale University Press. ISBN 978-0300112542.
- Ashraf, Assef (2024). Making and Remaking Empire in Early Qajar Iran. Cambridge University Press. ISBN 978-1009361552.
- Calmard, Jean (2004). "Moḥammad Shah Qājār". Encyclopaedia Iranica. London and New York.
- Cronin, Stephanie, ed. (2013). Iranian-Russian Encounters: Empires and Revolutions since 1800. Routledge. ISBN 978-0415624336.
- Garthwaite, Gene Ralph (2005). The Persians. Oxford & Carlton: Blackwell Publishing, Ltd. ISBN 978-1-55786-860-2.
- Hambly, Gavin R. G. (1991). "Iran during the reigns of Fath 'Alī Shāh and Muhammad Shāh". In Avery, Peter; Hambly, Gavin R. G.; Melville, Charles Peter (eds.). The Cambridge History of Iran: From Nadir Shah to the Islamic Republic. Vol. 7. Cambridge: Cambridge University Press. pp. 144–173. ISBN 0-521-20095-4.
- Kamshad, H. (2011). Modern Persian Prose Literature. Cambridge University Press. ISBN 978-0936347721.
- Kashani-Sabet, Firoozeh (2014). Frontier Fictions: Shaping the Iranian Nation, 1804–1946. Princeton University Press. ISBN 978-1850432708.
- Rahman, Munibur (1983). "Adīb-al-mamālek Farāhānī". In Yarshater, Ehsan (ed.). Encyclopædia Iranica. Vol. I/5: Adat–Afghanistan. London and New York: Routledge & Kegan Paul. pp. 380–381. ISBN 978-0-71009-094-2.
- Rypka, Jan (1968). History of Iranian Literature. Springer Netherlands. ISBN 978-9401034814.
- Zarrinkoob, A.H. (1978). "Ḳāʾim-Maḳām-i Farāhānī". In van Donzel, E.; Lewis, B.; Pellat, Ch. & Bosworth, C. E. (eds.). The Encyclopaedia of Islam, Second Edition. Volume IV: Iran–Kha. Leiden: E. J. Brill. p. 462. ISBN 978-90-04-05745-6. OCLC 758278456.
