= Fazel Khan Garrusi =

Iranian poet and secretary

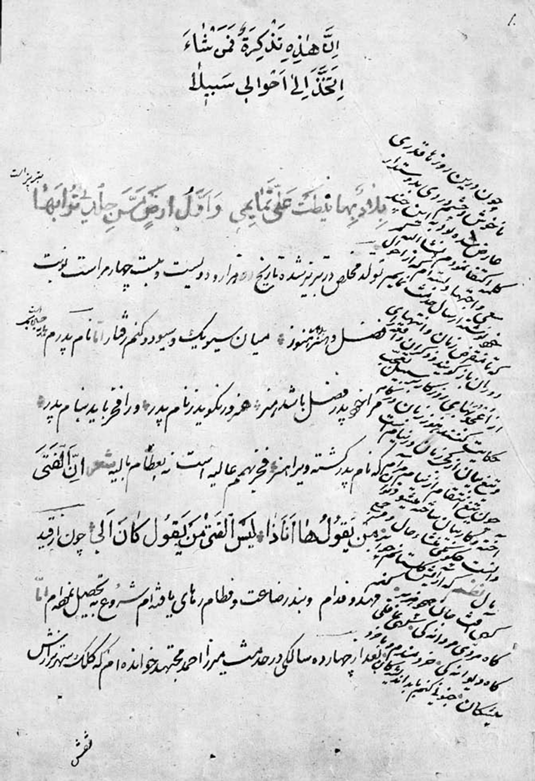
- Fazel Khan Garrusi's autobiography. Located in the National Library of Russia
- Born: 29 October 1784; Bijar, Iran
- Died: 1 March 1852 (aged 67); Tiflis, Russian Empire
- Occupations: Poet and secretary
- Writing career
- Language: Persian; Arabic
- Notable work: Tadhkara-ye anjoman-e Khaqan

Fazel Khan Mohammad Garrusi (Persian: فاضل خان گروسی; 29 October 1784 – 1852) was a poet and secretary in Qajar Iran, active under Fath-Ali Shah Qajar (r. 1797–1834) and Mohammad Shah Qajar (r. 1834–1848). From 1838, he spent his remaining years in Tiflis in the Russian Empire, having fled the country due to the schemes of the vizier of Mazandaran, Asadollah Navai.

== Biography ==
Born on 29 October 1784, he was from a branch of the Turkoman Bayandur tribe that lived in Bijar, the administrative capital of Garrus. He had temporarily thought about a career as a cleric in his youth. He made a lot of trips, especially to Iraq, where he demonstrated great proficiency in Arabo-Persian calligraphy. In order to seek revenge against the governor of Garrus for his actions, he ultimately went to Tehran. There, the poet laureate Fath-Ali Khan Saba noticed Fazel Khan's literary ability, refined calligraphy, and especially his strong memory, and thus invited him to the court. In 1819/20, he was appointed as the chief herald of the court. In the summer of 1829, he was part of the retinue of the Qajar prince Khosrow Mirza, who had been dispatched to Russia to formally apologize for the killing of the Russian diplomat Alexander Griboyedov in Tehran. During the journey, he met the Russian poet Alexander Pushkin near Mount Kazbek. Pushkin, who was impressed by Fazil Khan's manners, described the meeting in his travelogue A Journey to Arzrum and wrote the unfinished poem "Fazil-Khanu" (To Fazil Khan).

Information on Fazel Khan's last post is provided by his later friend, the Russian orientalist Nicholas Khanikov. According to him, Fazel Khan worked in the Mazandaran as a court poet of the prince Ardashir Mirza for several years. However, Asadollah Navai, the vizier of Mazandaran, considered Fazel Khan's influence over Ardashir Mirza to be excessive and sought help from the new premier Haji Mirza Aqasi, who as a result summoned Fazel Khan to Tehran. Fearing the worst, Fazel Khan escaped by sea to Baku, where he encountered the new Russian viceroy Yevgeny Golovin, and then traveled on to Tiflis with him.

Among the other Iranians in Tiflis was the hereditary shaykh al-Islam of Tabriz, the mojtahed Agha Mir Fattah Tabataba'i, who surrendered Tabriz to the Russians in 1827 during the war of 1826–1828 and was an opponent of Fath-Ali Shah. In 1842, he returned to Tabriz after losing his position as Paskevich's main Islamic religious authority. Another was the Russian contender for the Iranian throne, the Qajar prince Bahman Mirza, who left for Tiflis in 1848, and went to Shusha in 1860. Fazel Khan died on 1 March 1852.

== Works ==
Fazel Khan's pen name was Ravi ("story teller") and Sheyda/Shayda ("madly in love"). He was a prolific poet and epistolary prose writer, although only a portion of his works have survived. His epistolary prose goes against established norms. Together with the statesman and prose writer Abol-Qasem Qa'em-Maqam, he played an important role in establishing Persian prose. According to the modern historian Marina Alexidze; "It is obvious from these letters that Garrusi was a highly popular and estimated writer among the Iranian intellectuals of his time."

Fazel Khan has been mostly ignored by Iranian and European scholars, despite having a significant impact on the growth of Persian literature in general and especially modern Persian prose. Reza-Qoli Khan Hedayat was the first Iranian writer to mention Fazel Khan. Two works by Fazel Khan has survived; the collection of his letters, which is kept in the Tabriz National Library; the biographical work Tadhkara-ye anjoman-e Khaqan ("The Gathering of Rulers"), which was finished in 1818/19, and has four chapters on the lives of Fath-Ali Shah, the Qajar princes, and panegyrists at Fath-Ali Shah's court along with portions of their poetry. A biography of Fazel Khan is included in the epilogue. The library of the Sepahsalar Mosque in Tehran has a manuscript of the work that was copied in 1820/21. Fazel Khan showed his admiration for Fath-Ali Shah by expressing high regard for the panegyrists in the latter's court and by placing Saba's epic poem Shahanshah-nameh above the Shahnameh by Ferdowsi, a remark which Fath-Ali Shah's son Aliqoli Mirza Qajar ridiculed.

Fazel Khan is known to have authored a number of textbooks and instructional guides for the Muslim school in Tiflis, such as; the Persian Grammar, a compilation of core Shia Muslim beliefs; an introduction to the Arabic language; and commentary on the Qur'anic passages that are complex.

== Sources ==
- Afshar, Iraj (1999). "Fāżel Khan Garrūsī, Moḥammad". In Yarshater, Ehsan (ed.). Encyclopædia Iranica. Vol. IX/5: Fauna III–Festivals VIII. London and New York: Routledge & Kegan Paul. p. 1999. ISBN 978-0-933273-33-7.
- Alexidze, Marina (2003). "Fazel-Khan Garrusi and Tbilisi". Iran and the Caucasus. 7 (1/2): 125–131. JSTOR 4030972. (registration required)
- Davis, Derek (2022). "A Journey to Arzrum during the 1829 Campaign by A. S. Pushkin: Translation with Commentary". Journal of the Royal Asiatic Society. 32 (1). Cambridge University Press: 3–117. doi:10.1017/S1356186322000104.
- Haidari, A. A. (2013). A Modern Persian Reader. Routledge. ISBN 978-0728600065.
- Melville, Firuza I. (2013). "Khosrow's mission to St Petersburg in 1829". In Cronin, Stephanie (ed.). Iranian-Russian Encounters: Empires and Revolutions since 1800. Routledge. pp. 69–94. ISBN 978-0415624336.
