= History of newspaper publishing in Iran =

Iranian media

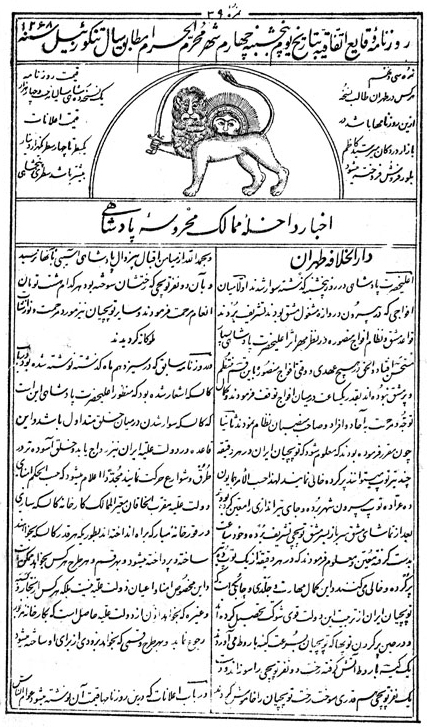
First page of an issue of the Vaqâye'-e Ettefâqiyye

The history of newspaper publishing in Iran goes back to the 19th century, under the Qajar dynasty. The first newspaper in Iran, Kâghaz-e Akhbâr (Persian: کاغذ اخبار, lit. 'The Newspaper'), was created for the government by Mirza Saleh Shirazi in 1837. Shirazi had been sent to study in England by the crown prince Abbas Mirza in 1815. It was during his stay that Shirazi became interested in the printing press, which he imported to Iran. The Kâghaz-e Akhbâr was short-lived.

In 1851, the Vaqâye'-e Ettefâqiyye (Persian: وقایع اتفاقیه) was created as the official gazette of Iran. It was inspired by the Ottoman Takvim-i Vekayi. In 1860, its title was changed to Ruznâme-ye Dowlat-e 'Aliyye-ye Irân (Persian: روزنامهٔ دولت علیهٔ ایران, lit. 'The Newspaper of the Sublime State of Iran').

Ettela'at (established in 1926) and Kayhan (established in 1942), the two longest running national daily newspapers in Iran, were founded during the twentieth century and have remained in continuous publication since their establishment.

== Journalism education in Iran ==
Journalism education in Iran began in the early nineteenth century when Mirza Saleh Shirazi received journalistic training in England. For several decades thereafter, however, journalism was taught primarily through practical experience and the master apprentice system. In the 1930s, the first formal institutions for journalism education were established, followed in subsequent decades by the expansion of university programmes and short term professional training courses.

Following the 1979 Iranian Revolution, journalism education continued in universities and other educational institutions. Today, journalism is offered at institutions including the University of Tehran, Allameh Tabataba'i University, IRIB University, Soore University, Islamic Azad University, and Payame Noor University, as well as at a number of other higher education institutions and specialised media training centres.

== Iranian Journalism ==
Iranian journalism, also referred to as Iranian national journalism, is a concept introduced by Abolfazl Fateh to describe a model of journalism shaped by Iran's historical, cultural, and civilizational context. According to Fateh, just as terms such as Iranian architecture, Iranian literature, Iranian music, and Iranian cinema denote nationally distinctive traditions within broader universal disciplines, journalism may likewise develop characteristics that reflect Iran's own historical experience, language, culture, values, and collective identity. In this view, while adhering to the universal principles and professional standards of journalism, Iranian journalism possesses features that distinguish it as a national tradition.

Fateh distinguishes "journalism in Iran" from "Iranian journalism". He defines the former as a geographical term referring to journalism practiced within Iran, whereas the latter denotes a distinct journalistic paradigm characterized by features that, in his view, give it an Iranian identity and national character

== See also ==
- Akhtar (magazine), a magazine published in the Ottoman Empire for Iranians
- Official Gazette of Iran

== Sources ==
- Tavakoli-Targhi, Mohamad (2001). Refashioning Iran: Orientalism, Occidentalism and Historiography. Palgrave.
- Nabavi, Negin (2009). "JOURNALISM i. Qajar Period". Encyclopaedia Iranica.
