= Bijar (city) =

City in Kurdistan province, Iran

Bijar بیجار
- City
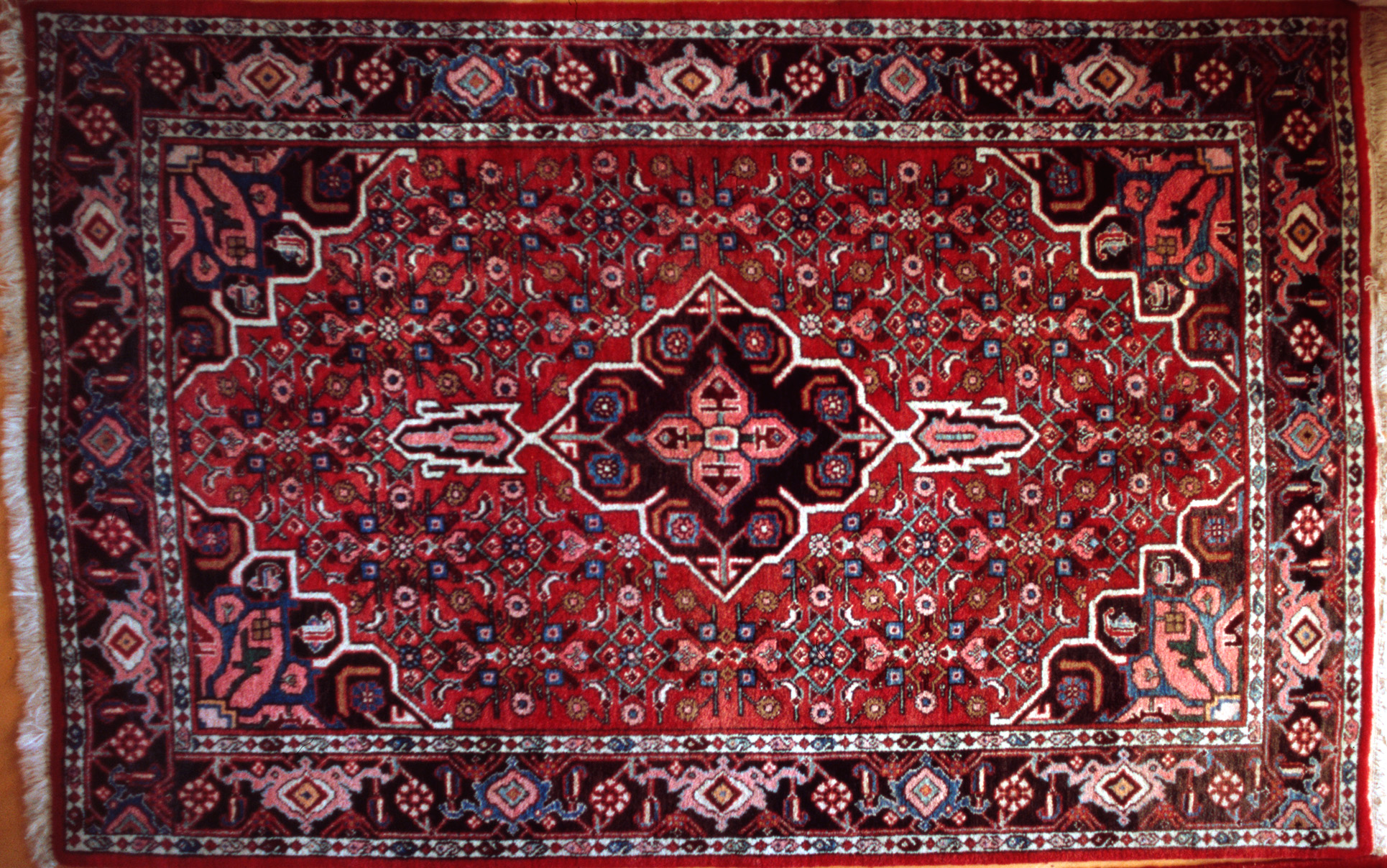
- A modern Bijar rug

- Location in Iran Bijar (Iran Kurdistan)
- Coordinates: 35°52′20″N 47°36′11″E
- Country: Iran
- Province: Kurdistan
- County: Bijar
- District: Central

Population (2016)
  - Total: 50,014

Bijar (Persian: بیجار) (Note: Also romanized as Bîcar and Bījār; Kurdish: بیجاڕ) is a city in the Central District of Bijar County, Kurdistan province, Iran, serving as capital of both the county and the district.

== History ==
The city was mentioned in the 15th century as a village belonging to Shah Ismail, the first ruler of the Safavid dynasty; Bijar became a town during the 19th century. During World War I it was besieged and occupied by Russian, British, and Ottoman troops who, with the aid of the 1918 famine, halved the pre-war population of 20,000.

== Demographics ==
=== Language and ethnicity ===
The city is predominantly populated by Kurds who speak Southern Kurdish, while a significant minority speak Sorani.

Bijar linguistic composition
language	percent
Southern Kurdish	90%
Central Kurdish	7.9%
New Persian	2%
Aramaic	0.1%

=== Population ===
At the time of the 2006 National Census, the city's population was 46,156 in 12,312 households. The following census in 2011 counted 47,926 people in 13,738 households. The 2016 census measured the population of the city as 50,014 people in 15,705 households.

== Geography ==
With an elevation of 1,940 metres, Bijar has been called the Roof of Iran.

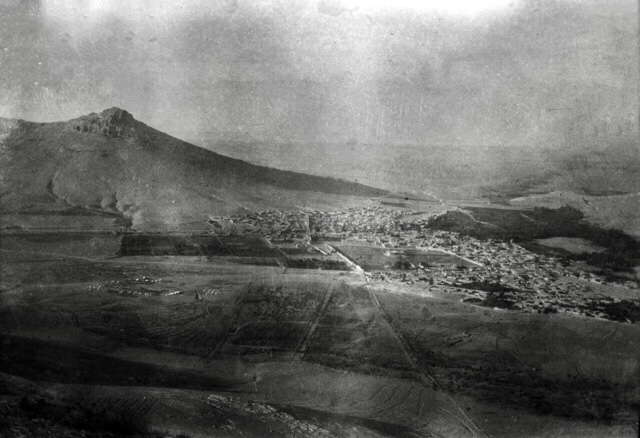
Bijar in the First World War

=== Climate ===
Bijar has a cold semi-arid climate (BSk) according to the Köppen climate classification.

Climate data for Bijar (1987-2010 normals), elevation: 1,883.4 m (6,179 ft)
Month	Jan	Feb	Mar	Apr	May	Jun	Jul	Aug	Sep	Oct	Nov	Dec	Year
Daily mean °C (°F)	−3.6 (25.5)	−1.3 (29.7)	4.4 (39.9)	10.3 (50.5)	14.9 (58.8)	20.6 (69.1)	24.1 (75.4)	24.0 (75.2)	19.4 (66.9)	13.2 (55.8)	6.0 (42.8)	0.7 (33.3)	11.1 (51.9)
Record low °C (°F)	−24.5 (−12.1)	−28.5 (−19.3)	−17.2 (1.0)	−7.4 (18.7)	−1.0 (30.2)	3.2 (37.8)	7.3 (45.1)	8.4 (47.1)	3.2 (37.8)	−1.7 (28.9)	−9.5 (14.9)	−23.5 (−10.3)	−28.5 (−19.3)
Average precipitation mm (inches)	35.6 (1.40)	34.6 (1.36)	55.6 (2.19)	62.2 (2.45)	30.4 (1.20)	6.8 (0.27)	4.3 (0.17)	4.5 (0.18)	2.5 (0.10)	25.1 (0.99)	40.3 (1.59)	37.4 (1.47)	339.3 (13.37)
Source: Iran Meteorological Organization (temperatures), (records), (precipitation)

== Architecture ==
The historic fort of Qam Cheqay (45 km NE of Bijar) probably dates back to the Median era and is the oldest castle in Kurdistan province. The castle had been used until the Sasanian era and it is an example of the ancient architecture of Kurdistan.

Another historical building, Emamzadeh Aqil, located in Hasan Abad (Yasukand) 45 km east of Bijar, is one of the remaining Seljuk buildings. This square building (6*6.5 m) with a collapsed dome houses Islamic religious texts written in Kufic script.

During the Mongol invasion of Iran in the 13th century, Genghis Khan (1162–1227) occupied Bijar and built Genghis Castle near the city. It is now a ruin on the Bijar—Sanandaj road.

Bijar's bazaar, with its unique design, is one of the attractions of the city. The roofed bazaar built in the Qajar era is much younger than the old Safavid-era bazaar of Sanandaj, the Kurdistan capital. The bazaar of Bijar consists of a main north–south roofed pathway, an eastern section (Timcheh-e Haj Shahbaz) and a western section (Timcheh-e Amir Toman).

== Rugs ==
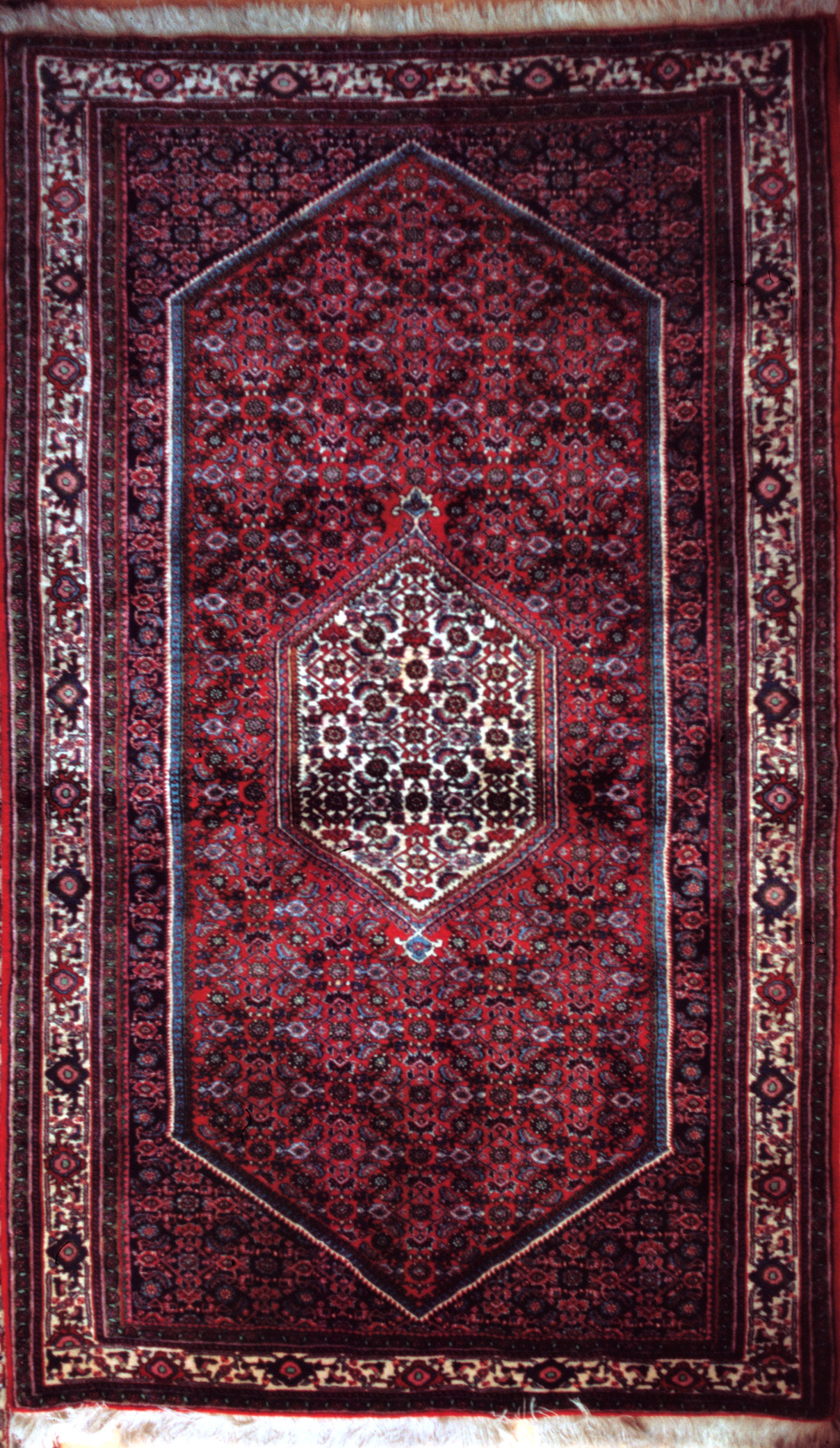
A fine quality modern Bijar rug with a central medallion, herati motifs on a dark red ground and a seven-band border

Bijar has enjoyed fame for its carpets since the Achaemenid era (550–330 BCE). Present day carpets and rugs have 100–200 Turkish knots per inch and are distinguished by their stiff and heavy wool foundation, created by "wet weaving" and beating the threads together with a special metal tool. Bijar carpets are famously stronger and longer-lasting than any others. They are made by Kurdish women in the villages around the town. The loom is set vertically against the side of the house. The designs have strong clear colours and have never been out of fashion with overseas buyers. Nowadays dyes are high quality synthetics.

The motifs are mainly floral adaptations of classical Persian designs. Herati and boteh motifs are common, as are central medallions and sometimes representations of animals and willows. These are set against a dark background of blue, red or green. In relation to the size of the carpet, borders are small, with up to eight bands.

== Notable people ==
Prominent politicians and army officers in the Iranian army have come from Bijar. Amir Nezam Garrusi (1820–1900) was born in Bijar to a Kabudvand family. As colonel of the Garrus Regiment, he took part in Mohammad Shah Qajar's unsuccessful Herat Campaign. As a diplomat in Paris, he had dinners with Napoleon III. He later acted as an Iranian diplomat to the Sublime Porte. General Garrusi joined in the 1880 suppression of the Kurdish uprising by the Sheikh Ubeydullah of Neri. He also played a part in the murder of Cewer Agha, the predecessor of Simko, the Kurdish leader.

The family of Rear Admiral Gholamali Bayandor (1898–1941) came from Bijar.

Among academic figures from Bijar is Dr Kamran Nejatollahi (1953–1978), a young civil engineering professor in the Polytechnic University of Tehran (now Amirkabir). He was killed during a peaceful sit-in at the university, presumably by Savak snipers. He is now regarded as an early martyr of the Islamic revolution and is buried among "political dissidents" in Behesht-e Zahra in Teheran.

The poet Fazel Khan Garrusi (1784–1843) was born into a Bijar family before moving to Tehran.

Abdollah Ramezanzadeh, the spokesman of the former Khatami government, was born and raised in Bijar. He was the governor of Kurdistan Province 1997–2001, but has been in prison since the disputed 2009 presidential election.

Farhad Aslani (1966– ) the actor was born in Bijar.

Other prominent Bijaris include bodybuilding champion Baitollah Abbaspour (1979– ) and footballer Eshaq Sobhani (1984– ).

In June 2008, 21-year-old Hana Abdi, former student of Payame Noor University in Bijar and a member of the Azarmehr Organization of Women of Sanandaj, was sentenced to prison for five years but released after 15 months. The Iranian Revolutionary Court had charged her with "enmity against God" and "gathering and colluding to harm national security".

== See also ==
- Khosrow Abad Gerrus Mosque
