= Hajji Baba Afshar =

Iranian medical doctor

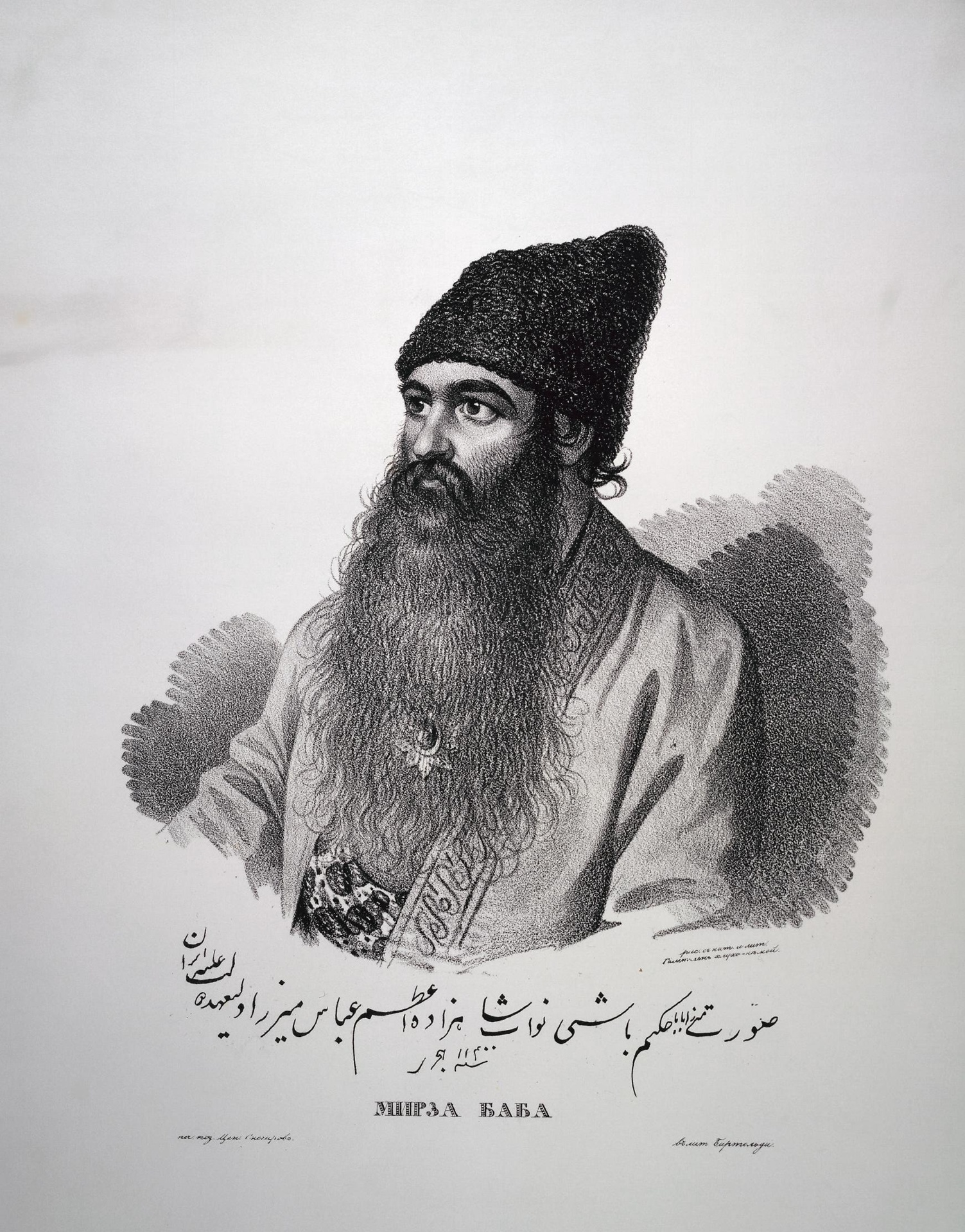
- Portrait of Hajji Baba Afshar by Karl Hampeln, dated 1829
- Died: 1842/43; Qajar Iran
- Occupation: Doctor
- Children: Mirza Mohammad Mostawfi; Mirza Ali
- Relatives: Jafar-qoli Beg (brother)

Hajji Baba Afshar (also spelled Haji; Persian: افشار، حاجی بابا) was an Iranian doctor, who was the first from his country to apply modern European medicine. He was the chief physician at the courts of the Qajar crown prince Abbas Mirza and the latters son Mohammad Shah Qajar (r. 1834–1848).

Since "Hajji Baba" is a name typically given to a child in celebration and remembrance of his grandfather or great-grandfather, his true name is unknown.

He was sent in 1811 together with a number of others to study medicine and chemistry in England at the expense of the crown prince and under the supervision of Sir Harford Jones-Brydges.

Although he stayed for eight years in England, he did not receive a degree. Upon return he was the court physician under Mohammad Shah Qajar. He died in 1842 or 1843. He had two sons, Mirza Mohammad Mostawfi and Mirza Ali. He also had a brother named Jafar-qoli Beg, who was a mining engineer in Russia.

Hajji Baba may have been the inspiration for the best-selling novels, The Adventures of Hajji Baba of Ispahan (1824) and The Adventures of Hajji Baba of Ispahan in England (1828), written by James Justinian Morier. According to Stuart, Hajji Baba was extremely annoyed at Morier’s use of his name for the title of his novel The Adventures of Hajji Baba of Ispahan.

== Sources ==
- Ardakani, H. Mahbubi (1984). "Afšār, Ḥāǰǰī Bābā". In Yarshater, Ehsan (ed.). Encyclopædia Iranica. Vol. I/6: Afghanistan–Ahriman. London and New York: Routledge & Kegan Paul. p. 586. ISBN 978-0-71009-095-9.
- Cronin, Stephanie, ed. (2013). Iranian-Russian Encounters: Empires and Revolutions since 1800. Routledge. ISBN 978-0415624336.
- Ebrahimi, Zahra (2022). "Ḥājī Bābā Āfshār". In Madelung, Wilferd; Daftary, Farhad (eds.). Encyclopaedia Islamica Online. Brill Online. ISSN 1875-9831.
