= Firoozeh Kashani-Sabet =

American-Iranian historian

- Born: Tehran, Iran

Academic background
- Education: University of North Carolina at Chapel Hill (B.A., 1989); Yale University (M.A., M.Phil., Ph.D.)
- Thesis: Frontier Fictions: Land, Culture, and Shaping the Iranian Nation, 1804-1946 (1997)

Academic work
- Institutions: University of Pennsylvania
- Main interests: Iranian-Afghan relations, Iraqi-Iranian relations, Modern Islam

Firoozeh Kashani-Sabet is an American-Iranian historian. She serves as Walter H. Annenberg Professor of History at the University of Pennsylvania. Her research focuses on boundary disputes, borderland histories, gender, and identity politics in the Middle East.

== Early life and education ==
Born and raised in Tehran, Iran, Kashani-Sabet attended the Community School in Tehran. During the Iran-Iraq War, Kashani-Sabet moved to Paris, France and lived there for approximately a year before immigrating to the United States.

== Career ==
She attended the University of North Carolina at Chapel Hill on a Morehead scholarship and graduated in 1989. Subsequently, she attended graduate school in history at Yale University. After earning her doctorate at Yale, Kashani-Sabet joined the faculty of the University of Pennsylvania in 1999. Shortly thereafter, she published "Frontier Fictions: Shaping the Iranian Nation, 1804-1946," which analyzed the significance of land and border disputes as it related to identity and nation formation. In 2006, she was appointed director of The Middle East Center at Penn. Kashani-Sabet published a novel called "Martyrdom Street," which focused on life in Iran and America during the Revolution and after the Iran-Iraq War. The next year, she published "Conceiving Citizens: Women and the Politics of Motherhood in Iran" by Oxford University Press. The book, which won the 2012 Journal of Middle East Women's Studies Book Award, focused on the history of reproductive health and the politics of motherhood in Iran, and how these themes have influenced politics. The next year, Kashani-Sabet was named the Robert I. Williams Term Professor of History in the School of Arts and Sciences.

In 2014, Kashani-Sabet and Beth S. Wenger co-edited "Gender in Judaism and Islam: Common Lives, Uncommon Heritage", and, the following year, in 2015, she received a fellowship at the Institute for Advanced Study in Princeton. The next year, she was appointed Walter H. Annenberg Professor of History.
