= Jahangir Mirza Qajar =

Iranian prince (1810/11–1853)

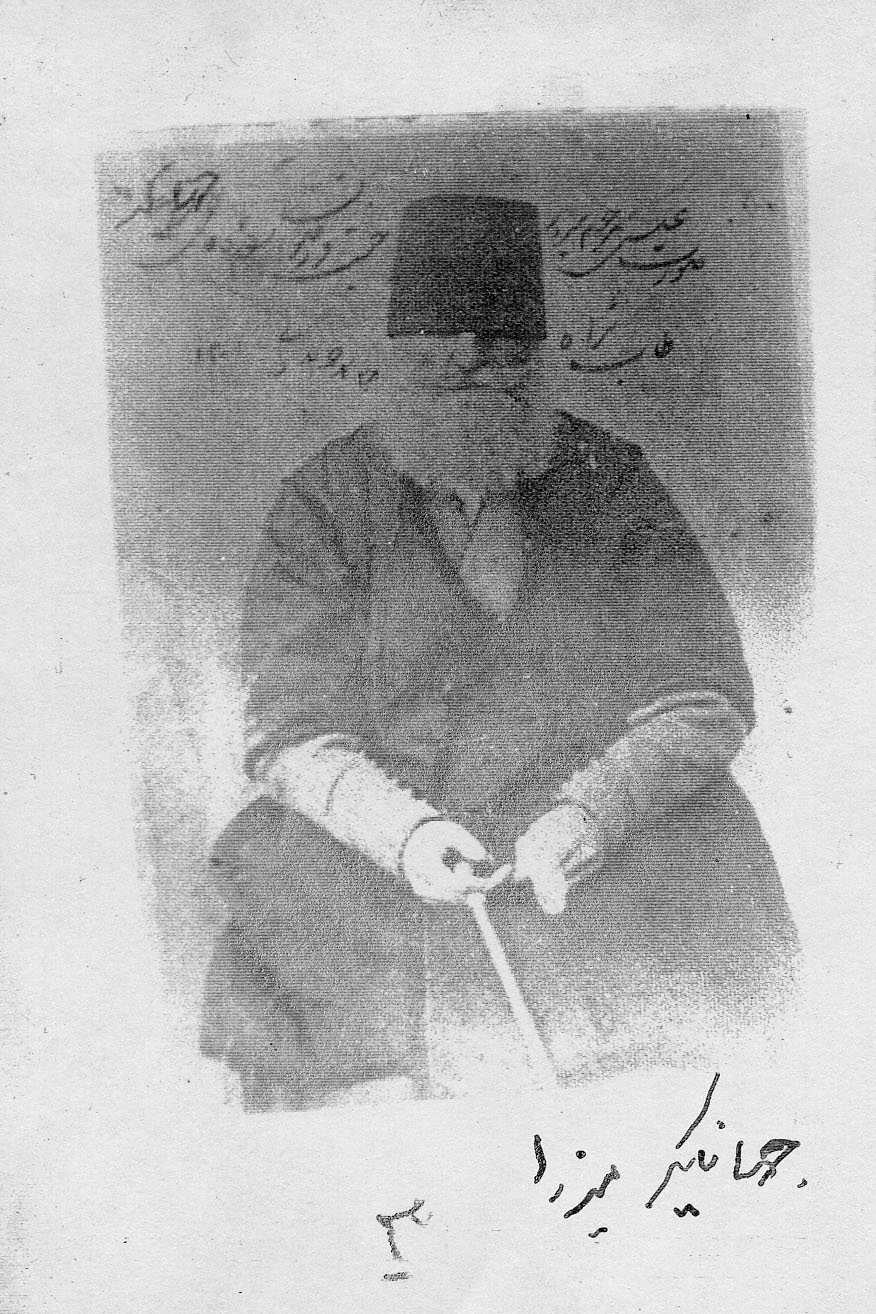
- Jahangir Mirza Qajar, blinded by the order of Mohammad Shah Qajar, his half-brother. Photograph taken circa 1852. Parvaresh Family Collection
- Born: 1810/11
- Died: 1853
- Issue: Abdollah Mirza Qajar
- Dynasty: Qajar
- Father: Abbas Mirza
- Religion: Twelver Shia Islam
- Writing career
- Language: Persian
- Notable works: Tarikh-e No

Jahangir Mirza Qajar (Persian: جهانگیرمیرزا; 1810/11 – 1853) was a Qajar prince and historian in Iran, who was the author of the Tarikh-e No ("New History"), a history of the Qajar dynasty. He was the third son of the crown prince Abbas Mirza, and the father of the photographer Abdollah Mirza Qajar.

== Sources ==
- Amanat, Abbas (1997). Pivot of the Universe: Nasir Al-Din Shah Qajar and the Iranian Monarchy, 1831–1896. I.B. Tauris. ISBN 978-1845118280.
- Beigi, Fahimeh Ali (2014). "Jahangir Mirza". Encyclopaedia of the World of Islam (in Persian). Vol. 11. Encyclopaedia Islamica Foundation. ISBN 9789644470127.
- Helbig, Elahe (2017). "Geographies Traced and Histories Told: Photographic Documentation of Land and People by ʿAbdollah Mirza Qajar, 1880s–1890s". In Markus Ritter; Scheiwiller, Staci G. (eds.). The Indigenous Lens?: Early Photography in the Near and Middle East. De Gruyter. pp. 79–110. ISBN 978-0300112542.
