= Haji Mirza Aqasi =

Iranian politician (1783–1849)

- حاجی میرزا آقاسی
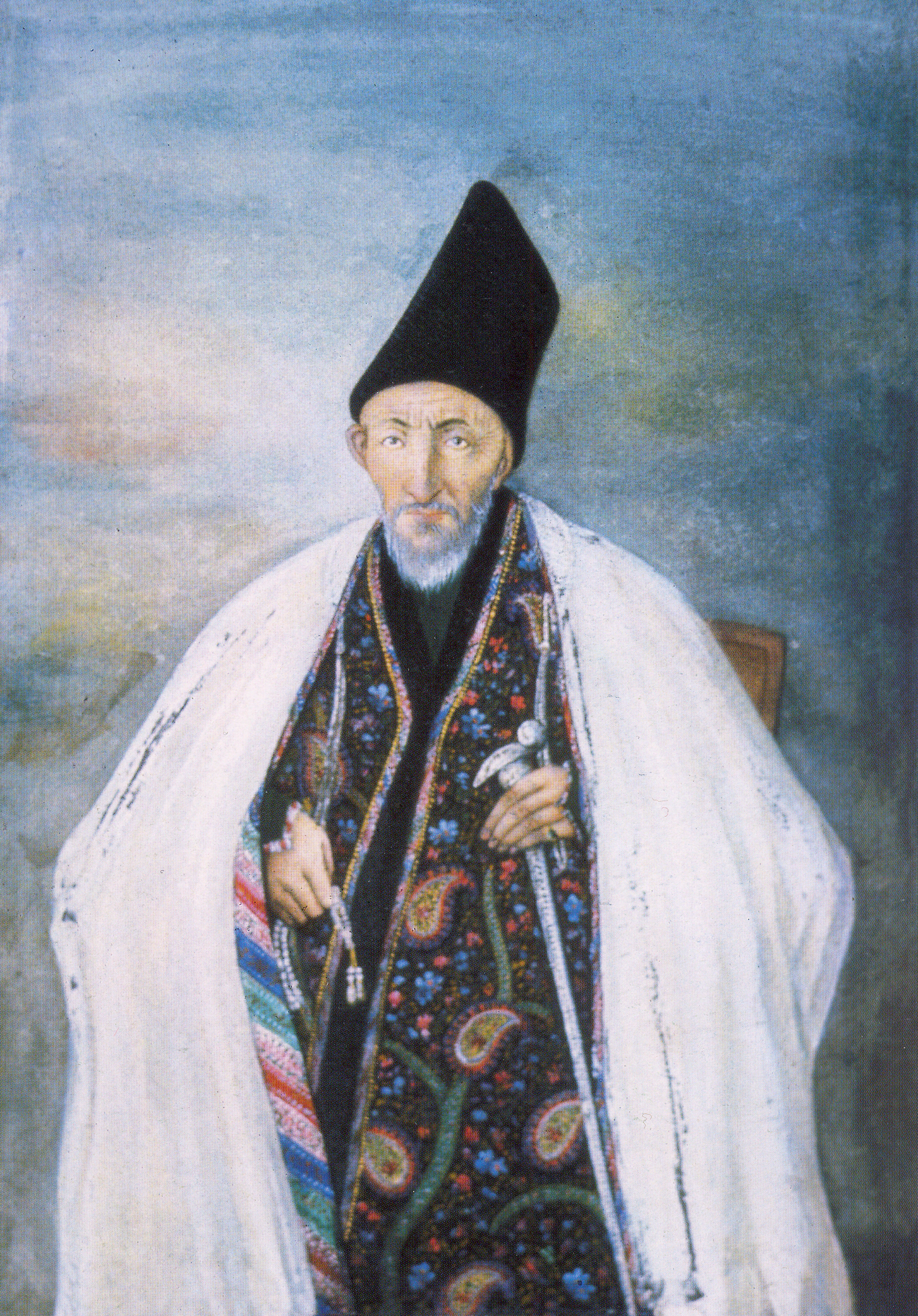
- Portrait of Aqasi by Sani al-Mulk, ca. 1846

Prime Minister of Qajar Iran
- In office 1835–1848
- Monarch: Mohammad Shah Qajar
- Preceded by: Mirza Abu'l-Qasem Qa'em-Maqam
- Succeeded by: Amir Kabir

Minister of Foreign Affairs

Acting
- In office 1845–1846
- Monarch: Mohammad Shah Qajar
- Preceded by: Mirza Abolhassan Khan Ilchi
- Succeeded by: Mirza Masoud Ansari Garmrudi

Personal details
- Born: Abbas c. 1783 Iravan, Iravan Khanate, Qajar Iran
- Died: 1849 Ottoman Iraq, Ottoman Empire (present-day Iraq)
- Spouse: Ezzat Nesā Khanum
- Occupation: Politician

Haji Mirza Abbas Iravani (Persian: حاجی میرزا عباس ایروانی), better known by his title of Aqasi (آقاسی; also spelled Aghasi), was an Iranian politician who served as the grand vizier of the third Qajar shah, Mohammad Shah Qajar (r. 1834–1848) from 1835 to 1848.

== Early life ==
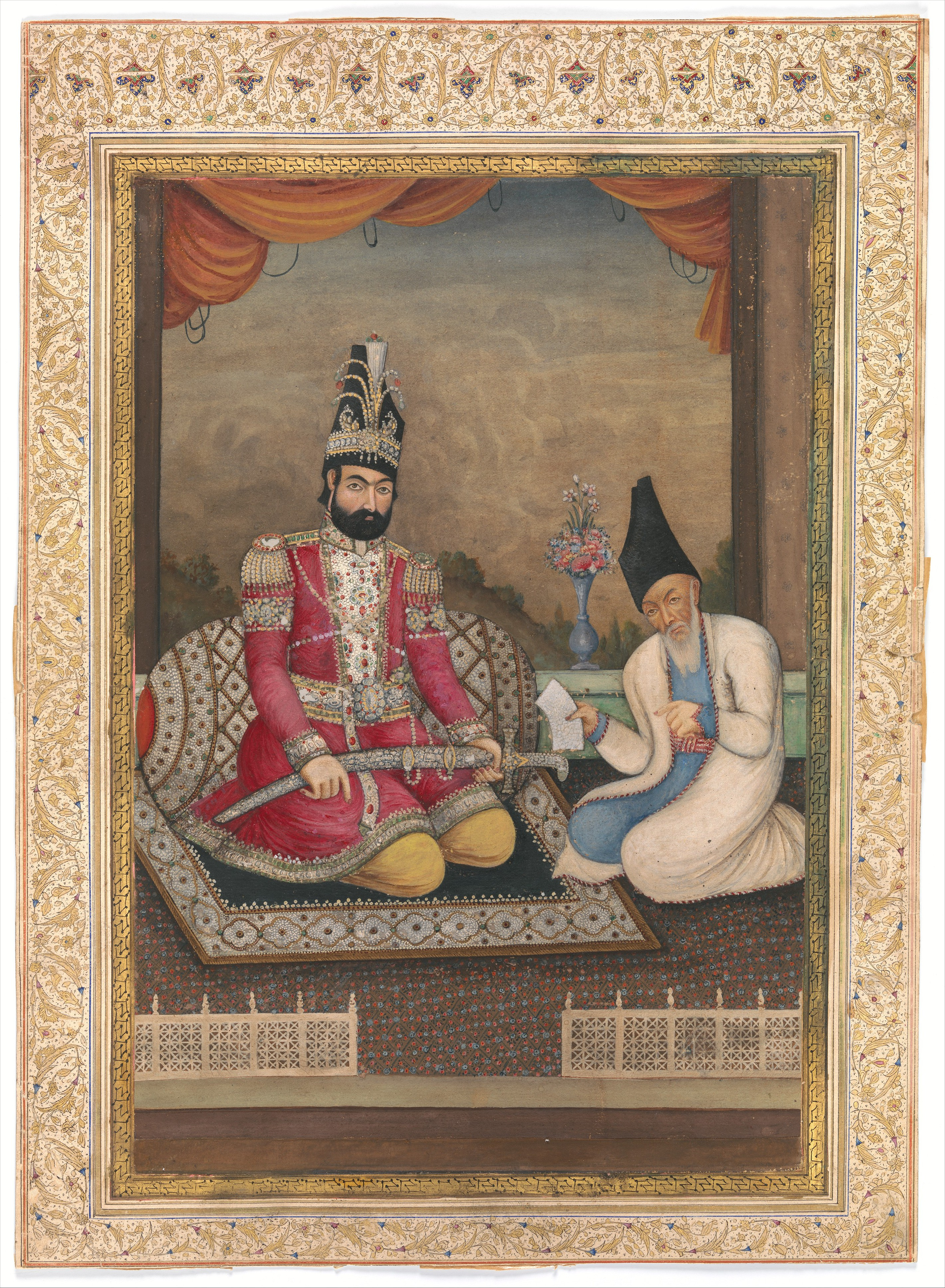
Portrait of Mohammad Shah Qajar and Aqasi, second quarter of the nineteenth century, Ink, opaque watercolor and gold on paper, Iran, collection of the Metropolitan Museum of Art

Abbas was born in c. 1783 in Iravan (Yerevan), a city located in the Iravan Khanate, a khanate (i.e. province) located in the northwestern part of Qajar Iran. He was a son of Moslem ibn Abbas, a wealthy landowner, and a member of the Bayat clan. During his youth, Abbas spent his time with his father in the holy Shi'ite sites in Ottoman Iraq, where he was tutored by the Ne'matallahi Sufi teacher Molla 'Abd-al-Samad. There he stayed until 1802, when Molla 'Abd-al-Samad was killed during the Wahhabi sack of Karbala. For a period, Abbas embraced the life of a homeless dervish and made pilgrimage to Mecca, until he finally returned to his hometown, where reportedly served as a clerk to the Armenian patriarch of Iravan. After some time, he left for Tabriz, where he entered into the service of Mirza Bozorg Qa'em-Maqam, a Sufi advocate and the minister of crown prince Abbas Mirza. With the support of Mirza Bozorg, Abbas dressed up as a mullah and became the teacher of his son Musa. He eventually rose up further in rank, receiving toyuls (land) around Tabriz, and the title of Aqasi.

However, Mirza Bozorg's death in 1821 soon jeopardized the position of Aqasi; the conflict between Mirza Bozorg's sons, Musa and Abol-Qasem renewed the long-lasting strife in Tabriz between the Persians and Turks, which forced Aqasi—himself of Turkic stock and closely associated with the Turko-Kurdish Bayat chieftains of Maku—to flee from the victorious Abol-Qasem and take refuge in Khoy with its powerful leader, Amir Khan Sardar. With the help of the latter, Aqasi to enter into the service of Abbas Mirza, who by 1824 had appointed him as the tutor of several of his sons, including Fereydoun Mirza, and not long after, Mohammad Mirza (the future Mohammad Shah Qajar). This increased Aqasi's influence, thus strengthening his position despite Abol-Qasem's heavy criticism of his uncommon character and tutoring style. Mohammad Mirza ascended the throne November 1834, appointing Abol-Qasem as his minister, which essentially consolidated the power of the newly crowned shah during a period of difficulty. Nevertheless, the following year (June 1835), through the instigation of Aqasi, Mohammad Shah had Abol-Qasem dismissed and executed. Aqasi was subsequently made his new minister. Aqasi refrained from using the traditional vizier title of Sadr-e azam, instead referring himself by the title of Shakhs-e awwal (meaning "the first person" or "premier").

== Vizeriate ==
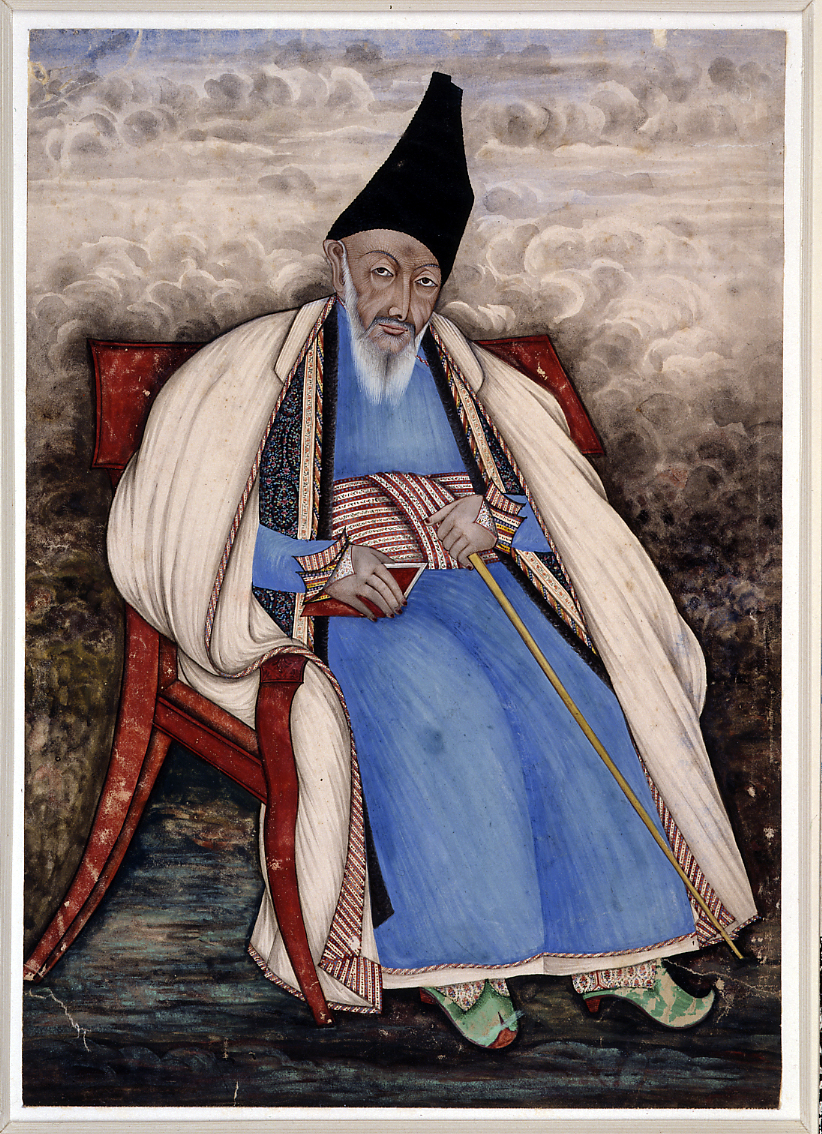
Portrait of Haji Mirza Aqasi, ca. 1840

The main reason behind Aqasi's appointment was not only due to the shah's fondness and absolute trust in him, but also because of Mohammad Shah's continuation of the early Qajar policy of retaining weak ministers with no autonomous political authority. Aqasi saw this as an advantage, using it in his favour to be able to maintain his office and perform actions while avoiding attention. In 1835/6, Aqasi had successfully eliminated all supporters of Abul-Qasem and replaced them with mainly allies from Azerbaijan.

Aqasi initiated Mohammad Shah into Sufi mysticism, and the two men "came to be known as two 'dervishes'." While he has often been criticised for contributing to the disasters of the reign, it is possible that he was attempting to use Sufism as a weapon against the growing hold of the official representatives of religion, the mullahs, who were opposing both modernisation and foreign influence. In foreign affairs, he managed to "prevent Iran disintegrating either into autonomous principalities or appanages of Russia, and Britain," and internally he "revived the cultivation of the mulberry tree in the Kerman region, to feed silkworms; and he envisaged the diversion of the waters of the River Karaj for Tehran's water-supply." The failure of Aqasi's countrymen to praise him for his enterprise was partly no doubt due to an equally shrewd appreciation on their part that new economic alignments emerging during his period as Prime Minister were not destined to enrich the people, but only to make a rapacious aristocracy more powerful, while the situation of the cultivator became little better than slavery.

Shoghi Effendi, head of the Baháʼí Faith in the first half of the 20th century, described Aqasi as "the Antichrist of the Bábí Revelation".

== Sources ==
- Peter Avery, Modern Iran, Praeger, 1965.
- Effendi, Shoghi (1944). God Passes By. Wilmette, Illinois: US Baháʼí Publishing Trust.
- Amanat, A. (1986). "ĀQĀSĪ". Encyclopaedia Iranica, Vol. II, Fasc. 2. pp. 183–188.
- Momen, Moojan (1981). The Bábí and Baháʼí Religions 1844-1944: Some Contemporary Western Accounts. G. Ronald. ISBN 978-0853981022.
- Amanat Abbas : « Iran, a modern history », Yale University Press, 2017
