= Mirza Bozorg Qa'em-Maqam =

Iranian official

Mirza Bozorg Qa'em-Maqam میرزابزرگ قائم‌مقام
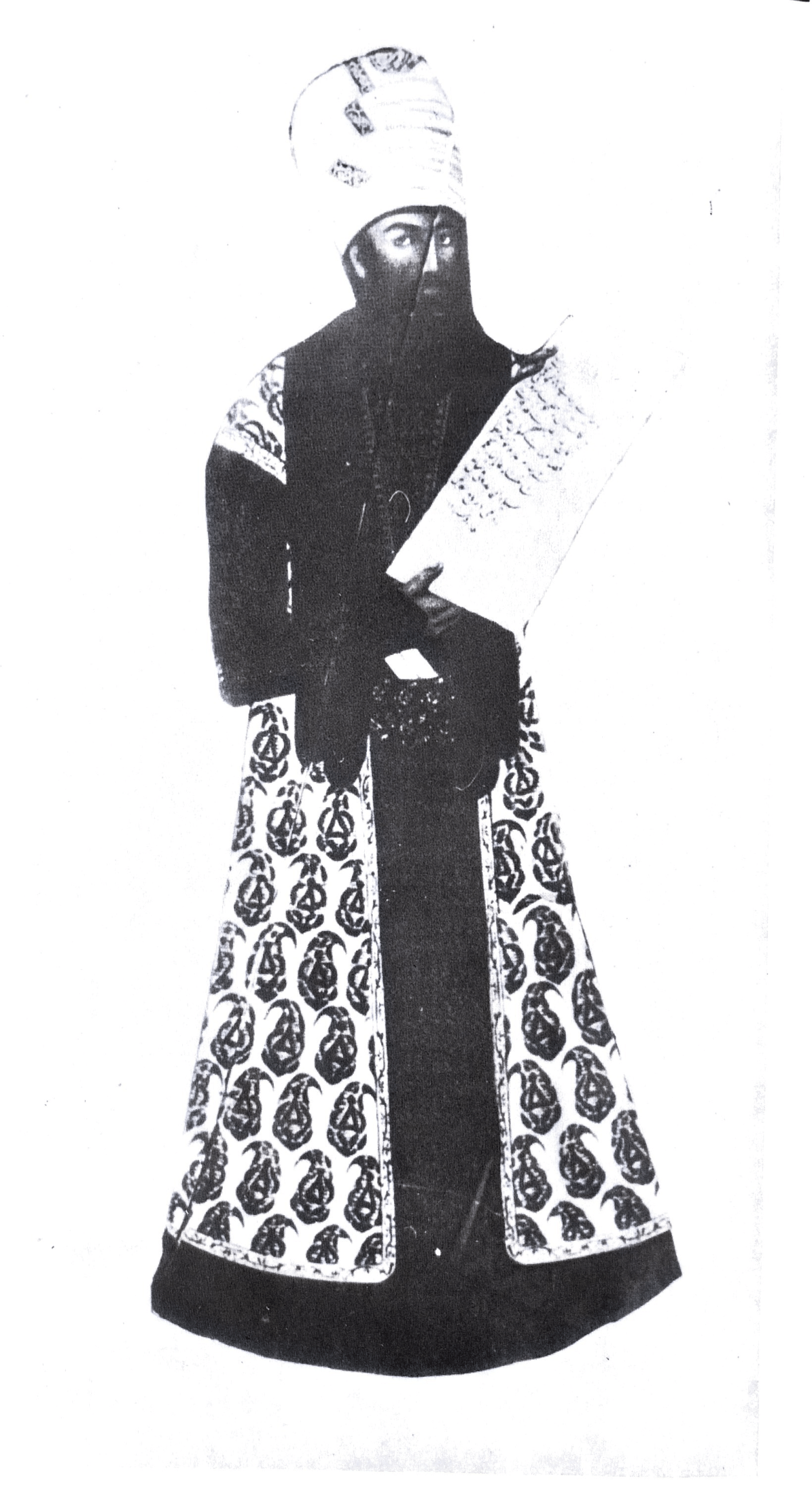
- Painting of Mirza Bozorg Qa'em-Maqam in a 1979 edition of the Risala-ye jihadiyya
- Born: 1754; Hazava, Zand Iran
- Died: 1822/23; Tabriz, Qajar Iran
- Occupation: Bureaucrat
- Notable work: Ahkam al-jihad wa-asbab al-rishad Ithbat l-nubuwwa
- Relatives: Abol-Qasem Qa'em-Maqam (son); Jafar Khan Moshir od-Dowleh (cousin)

Mirza Isa Farahani (Persian: میرزا عیسی فراهانی), commonly known as Mirza Bozorg Qa'em-Maqam (میرزابزرگ قائم‌مقام) (also spelled Qa'em-Maqam I; died 1822/23), was an Iranian official, who played a leading role in the politics of early 19th-century Qajar Iran. He was the father of the distinguished politician and writer Abol-Qasem Qa'em-Maqam (died 1835).

== Biography ==
Born in 1754, Mirza Bozorg was from the village of Hazava in the Farahan County, near the city of Arak. His family were part of the intellectual and literary aristocracy that had long served Iran's ruling dynasties. Mirza Bozorg first started working for the Zand dynasty with the encouragement of his uncle Mirza Husayn, who was in charge of managing his upbringing. Mirza Bozorg later began serving as a secretary in the divan of Agha Mohammad Khan Qajar (r. 1789–1797), the founder of the Qajar dynasty (1789–1925). When Mirza Bozorg finished his study at Najaf in Ottoman Iraq, he went back to Iran and joined the court of Agha Mohammad Khan's successor Fath-Ali Shah Qajar (r. 1797–1834). There he initially served as a secretary of the prime minister Hajji Ebrahim Shirazi, and later as the minister of the prince Hossein Ali Mirza, who governed the capital of Tehran. In 1798, Mirza Bozorg became the minister of the newly elected crown prince Abbas Mirza, as well as the deputy to the prime minister Mirza Shafi Mazandarani. As a sign of Mirza Bozorg's important position as the crown prince's minister, Abbas Mirza gave him the honorific title of qa'em maqam-e sedarat-e uzma ("deputy to the grand chancellor", Qa'em-Maqam I for short) in 1810.

Mirza Bozorg is well known for having backed Abbas Mirza's early modernization initiatives in the Azerbaijan region, particularly with relation to military changes. The Russo-Iranian War of 1804–1813 left Mirza Bozorg devastated by the heavy losses and convinced him that a modern Iranian force was required. Mirza Bozorg and Abbas Mirza, who were inspired by the Ottoman Empire, set out to develop a new military force that was trained in the European style of warfare and to lessen Iran's reliance on tribal and local forces. The development of a modern army, however, required more radical adjustments, such as administrative and economic reforms, which in turn demanded substantial adjustments to the entire structure of the state.

The military reforms that began in Azerbaijan served as a catalyst for the implementation of additional reform measures like sending students overseas (most often for military and technical education), adopting the printing press, and translating books into European languages. Mirza Bozorg was a key contributor to the design and execution of these reform initiatives. Abbas Mirza's jealous brothers, especially Mohammad-Ali Mirza Dowlatshah, as well as conservative court members criticized Abbas Mirza and Mirza Bozorg for their ideas of military reform being based on a European model. Accusations of professing Christianity was even made towards Mirza Bozorg, who was the main driving force behind the reforms. Besides taking part in the political world, Mirza Bozorg also composed some writings. His main contribution included two significant treatises, one on jihad and the other an apologetic treatise in defense of Islam. The rest of his work are poems, anthologies, and correspondences.

In 1822 or 1823, Mirza Bozorg died of cholera in the city of Tabriz. According to the Iranian-American historian Maziar Behrooz: "Among the Tabriz leadership Qa'em Maqam I was by far the ablest, not only in Azarbaijan but also in all of Iran."

== Sources ==
- Amanat, Abbas (2017). Iran: A Modern History. Yale University Press. ISBN 978-0300112542.
- Behrooz, Maziar (2023). Iran at War: Interactions with the Modern World and the Struggle with Imperial Russia. I.B. Tauris. ISBN 978-0755637379.
- Faridzadeh, Ghazaleh (2023). "Mīrzā ʿĪsā Qāʾim-Maqām Farahānī". Christian-Muslim Relations. A Bibliographical History Volume 20. Iran, Afghanistan and the Caucasus (1800-1914). Brill.
- Pourjavady, Reza (2023). "Russo-Iranian wars 1804-13 and 1826-8". Christian-Muslim Relations. A Bibliographical History Volume 20. Iran, Afghanistan and the Caucasus (1800-1914). Brill.
