= Karl Hampeln =

Austrian artist (1794–1880)

Karl von Hampeln
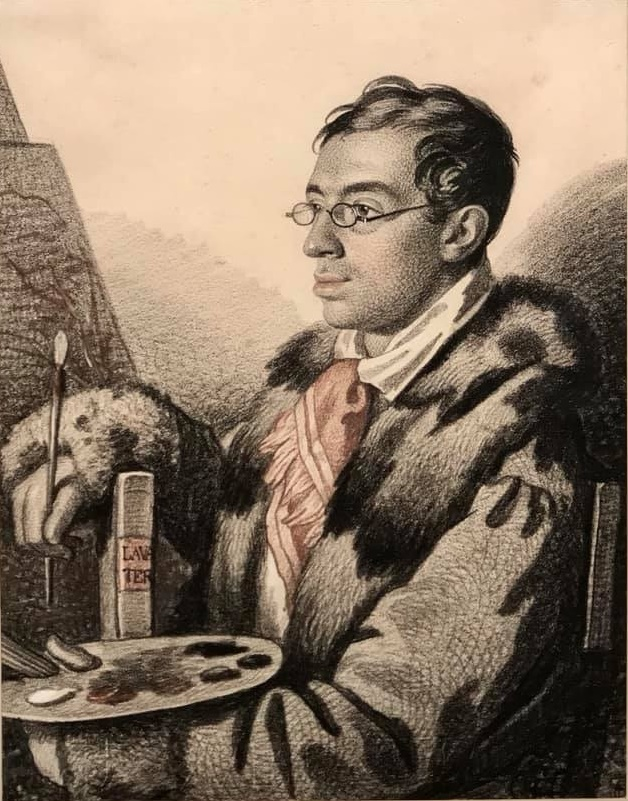
- Self portrait, 1820–1826
- Born: 1794; Moscow or Saint Petersburg, Russian Empire
- Died: 1880s Vienna, Austria-Hungary
- Known for: Portrait painting
- Patrons: Empress Maria Feodorovna

Karl von Hampeln, also known as Carl or Charles (Russian: Карл Карлович Гампельн, romanized: Karl Karlovich Gampeln; 1794 – after 1880), was an Austrian watercolour and miniature painter, graphic artist, portraitist, engraver, and lithographer active in the Russian Empire and Vienna.

Some sources mention that he was born in 1808 in Saint Petersburg.

== Biography ==
Karl von Hampeln was born deaf and mute into an Austrian family residing in the Russian Empire. With the scholarship granted by Empress Maria Feodorovna, he was first admitted to a school for the deaf in Vienna and later studied at the Academy of Fine Arts Vienna. During the Congress of Vienna in 1815, he was introduced to Tsar Alexander I, who financed his continued stay in Vienna.

In 1816, he received a second-class court award as an Engraver. In 1817, he returned to Russia, and after 1825, he became a drawing teacher at the St Petersburg College for the Deaf. He gained recognition in the Russian capital as a portraitist. After a temporary short stay in London, he spent his final years in Vienna.

== Sources ==
Hampeln, Carl von (Charles de, Russian: Гампельн). In: Ulrich Thieme, Fred C. Willis (eds.): Allgemeines Lexikon der Bildenden Künstler von der Antike bis zur Gegenwart. Founded by Ulrich Thieme and Felix Becker. Volume 15: Gresse–Hanselmann. E. A. Seemann, Leipzig, 1922, pp. 573–574. (Internet Archive).
