= Mohammad Shah Qajar =

Shah of Iran from 1834 to 1848

Mohammad Shah Qajar محمد شاه قاجار
- Shahanshah; Khaqan son of Khaqan; Ghazi
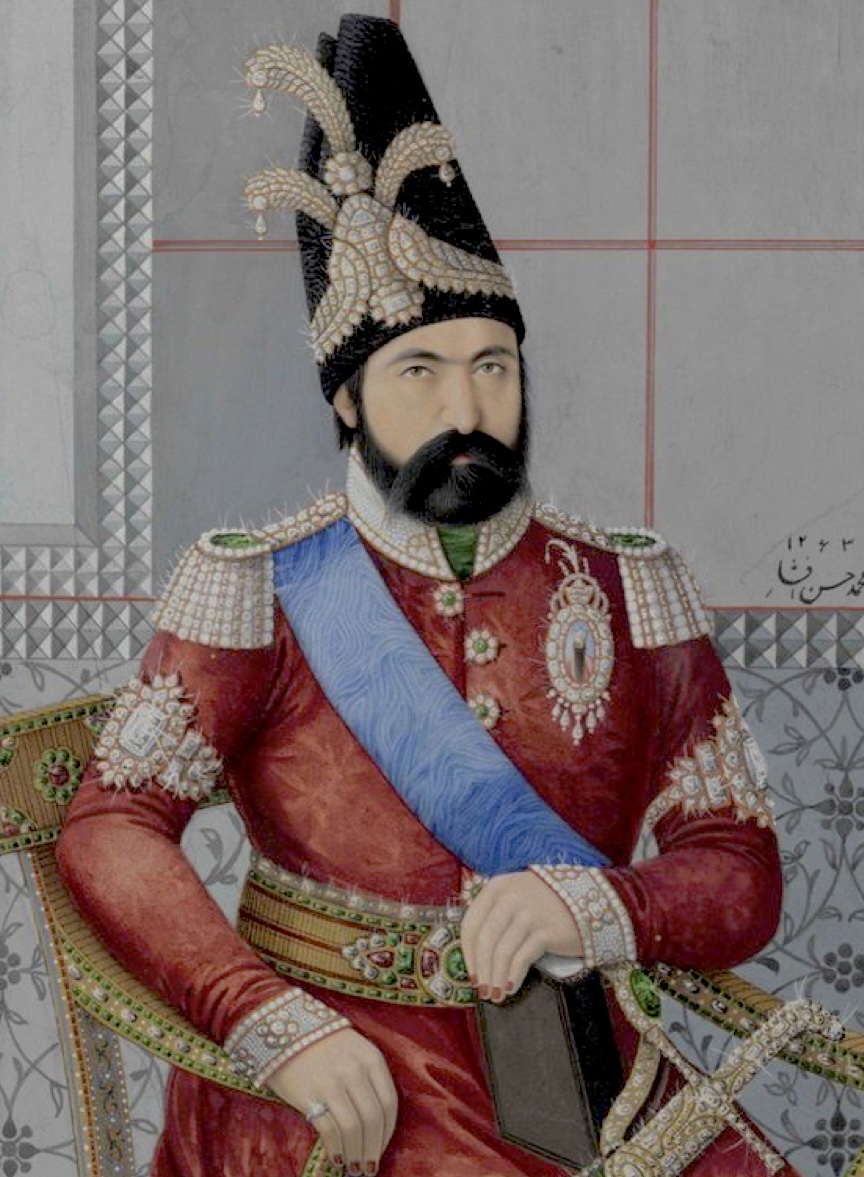
- Mohammad Shah by Sani al-Mulk c. 1840

Shah of Iran
- Reign: 23 October 1834 – 5 September 1848
- Coronation: 14 January 1835
- Predecessor: Fath-Ali Shah Qajar
- Successor: Naser al-Din Shah
- Premiers: Qa'em-Maqam; Haji Mirza Aqasi
- Born: Mohammad Mirza محمد میرزا; 5 January 1808; Tabriz, Qajar Iran
- Died: 5 September 1848 (aged 40); Tehran, Qajar Iran
- Burial: Fatima Masumeh Shrine, Qom
- Wives: Seven, among them, Malek Jahan Khanom
- Issue Detail: See Below
- Dynasty: Qajar
- Father: Abbas Mirza
- Mother: Galin Khanum
- Religion: Shia Islam (Note: Sufi order: Nematollahi)
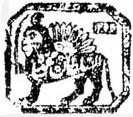
- Tughra

Mohammad Shah Qajar (Persian: محمدشاه قاجار; born Mohammad Mirza; 5 January 1808 – 5 September 1848) was the third Qajar shah of Iran from 1834 to 1848, inheriting the throne from his grandfather, Fath-Ali Shah. From a young age, Mohammad Mirza was under the tutelage of Haji Mirza Aqasi, a local dervish from Tabriz whose teachings influenced the young prince to become a Sufi-king later in his life. After his father Abbas Mirza died in 1833, Mohammad Mirza became the crown prince of Iran and was assigned with the governorship of Azarbaijan. After the death of Fath-Ali Shah in 1834, some of his sons including Hossein Ali Mirza and Ali Mirza Zel as-Soltan rose up as claimants to the throne. Mohammad Shah soon suppressed the rebellious princes and asserted his authority.

Mohammad Shah dismissed and executed his tactful premier, Abol-Qasem Qa'em-Maqam, and appointed his favourite, Haji Mirza Aqasi, as the grand vizier. The new shah's main goal was to reestablish the rule of the Iranian government in the rebellious city of Herat. In 1837 he marched to Herat and laid a futile siege on the city, which was eventually withdrawn when the British government threatened to invade Iran. On his return, Mohammad suppressed a revolt in Isfahan led by the major clergy figure Mohammad Bagher Shafti. Through British-Russian mediation, he concluded the Second Treaty of Erzurum with the Ottoman Empire, after initially wanting retaliation for the sack of Khorramshahr by the Ottoman governor of Baghdad in Ottoman Iraq.

Due to British pressure, Mohammad Shah reluctantly prohibited the slave trade through the Persian Gulf, but still allowed the possession and trade of slaves in the country. During the rise of the Bábism faith and its prophet Báb, Mohammad refused to persecute them despite the fatwa (decree) imposed by Shiite clerics. Diplomatic relations between France and Iran recommenced during his reign. Mohammad suffered from gout, which overshadowed his reign. In the final years of his life, his physical health deteriorated, leading to his death from a combination of gout and erysipelas on 4 September 1848 at the age of 40 after fourteen years of reign. He was buried at the Fatima Masumeh Shrine in Qom and was succeeded by his son, Naser al-Din Shah.

As a ruler, Mohammad Shah did not receive praise. He was labeled as a figurehead king for Aqasi, whom he was highly dependent on. Mohammad was devoted to both Aqasi and his teachings on Sufism; he became a willing sustainer of Sufis, and sought spiritual guidance in mystical rituals instead of the marji'i taqlīd (Shiite clerics). The ulama grew as his firmest rivals, who challenged his legitimacy and authority throughout his reign. Mohammad enlarged the Qajar bureaucracy, and filled governmental positions with Aqasi's Sufi friends and companions, thus establishing a corrupt administration that saw its peak during his son's reign. Mohammad Shah was the last Qajar king who attended the battlefield in a foreign war, and was also the last to use the title Ghazi (warrior of Islam) for his activity in the Russo-Iranian war and for suppressing the rebellion in Isfahan.

== Background ==
The Russian Empire invaded the Caucasus in 1795, when Agha Mohammad Khan, the founder of the Qajar dynasty, was reconquering the eastern provinces of Iran. Thus, Agha Mohammad was forced to withdraw his army and march towards the Caucasus without consolidating his rule in the east, including in Herat. The Russian army retreated before he could reach the Caucasus, and Agha Mohammad was assassinated in 1797 in Shusha. His realm never reached the far east of Greater Khorasan. Agha Mohammad Khan was succeeded by his nephew, Fath-Ali Shah. During the reign of Fath-Ali Shah, tensions in Iranian-Russian relations escalated and turned into two full scale wars which saw the defeat of Iran in several stages. According to the treaties of Gulistan and Turkmenchay, large parts of the realm were ceded and Iran was forced to make many concessions to Russia. The war also tarnished Iran's global image as being a weak state with unstable borders.

In Europe, the British Empire had emerged, gained sovereignty over India and viewed Iran as a strong barrier to prevent Russia from gaining access to the region. On the other hand, it was well known that the Russian Empire, in its quest to reach the open waters in southern Iran, intended to expand its sovereignty over Iranian territory. Thus, during the reign of Fath-Ali Shah, the Iranian political stage was a competition between the Russian and British governments to receive numerous concessions and expand political influence.

In the years between the two wars with Russia, a conflict broke out between Iran and the Ottoman Empire in 1821, which ended with the military victory of Iran and the conclusion of the First Treaty of Erzurum in 1823. The treaty did not resolve fundamental differences, the most important of which was the unclear borders of the two nations. There were also disputes such as the persecution of Iranian pilgrims to Shiite holy sites by the Ottomans and the citizenship of border tribes. Another contentious issue was the trade rivalry between Khorramshahr and Basra.

From the beginning of his reign, Fath-Ali Shah tried to present himself as a pious king in the eyes of the Shiite clerics and went so far as to declare his monarchy a subrogation for the ulama. During his reign, Isfahan once again took on the image of the religious capital of Iran, and the government left Shiite clerics free to persecute religious minorities. Sufis suffered the most. Fath-Ali Shah took it upon himself to lead their persecution, for example, ordering the "suffocation" of the Sufi leaders of Tabriz.

== Early life ==
=== Childhood ===
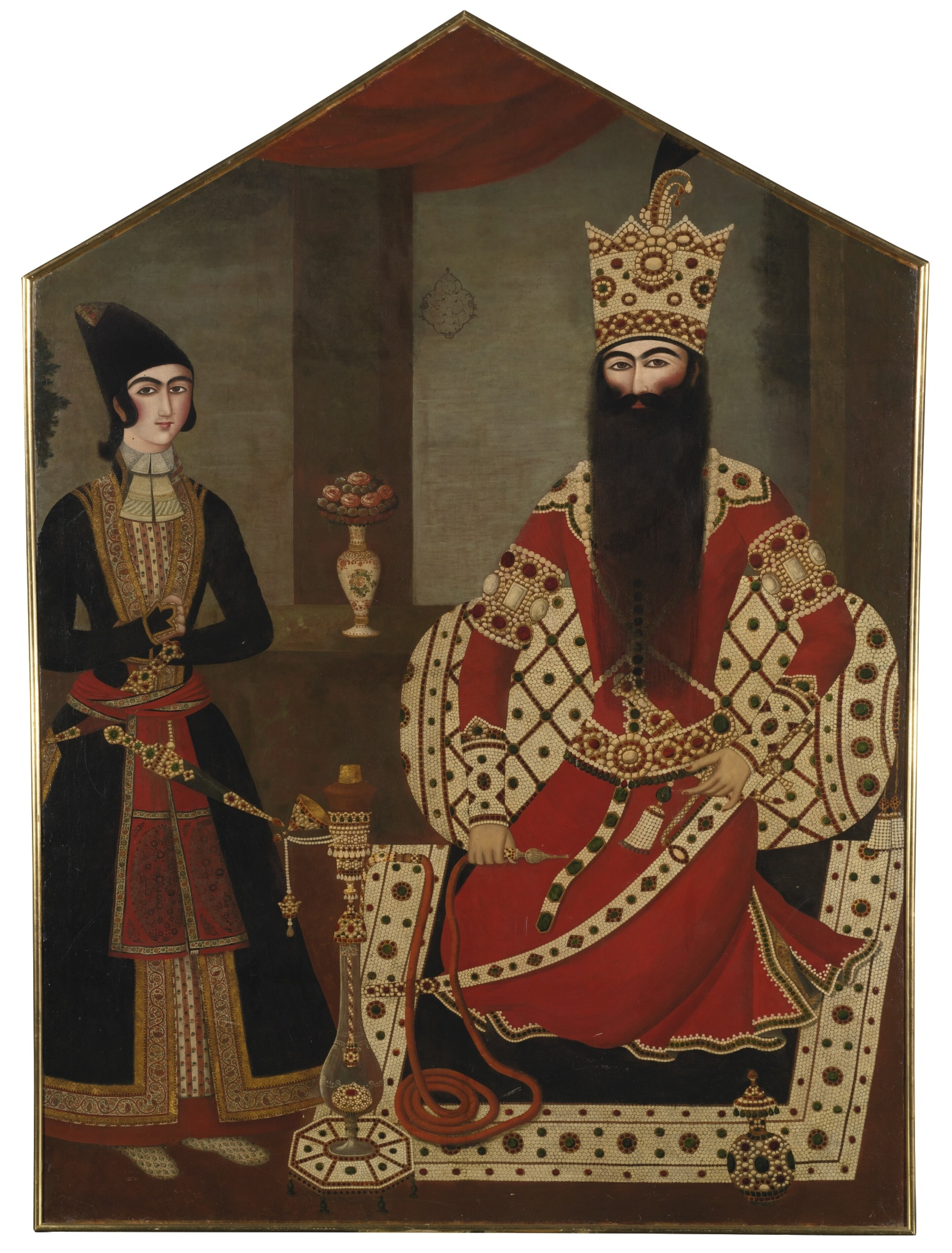
Fath-Ali Shah (right) attended by a prince (almost certainly Mohammad Mirza), attributed to Mihr 'Ali, circa 1820.

Mohammad Mirza was born on 5 January 1808 in Tabriz. He was the eldest son of crown prince Abbas Mirza and Galin Khanum, daughter of Mirza Mohammad Khan Qajar Davallu. During his childhood and youth, Mohammad Mirza was a "quiet" and "shy" boy with no apparent political ambitions. He completed his traditional princely education in Tabriz and became a skilled calligrapher and painter, he learned the latter from the Scottish artist Robert Ker Porter. His level of knowledge, however, was limited compared to that of his brothers, especially Djahangir Mirza and Farhad Mirza, who excelled in writing and other "branches of science". A turning point in his life was the arrival of the local dervish, Haji Mirza Aqasi, in his father's household. By the orders of Abbas Mirza's majordomo, Mirza Bozorg Qa'em-Maqam, Aqasi was appointed the chief tutor to Mohammad, who quickly became a devotee of his Sufi teachings. Abol-Qasem Qa'em-Maqam, another of Mohammad's tutors, tried to dissuade Mohammad from studying under Aqasi, but Aqasi's influence on Mohammad increased.

When Mohammad Mirza was 12 years old, Fath-Ali Shah summoned him to Tehran to marry Malek Jahan Khanom, the daughter of Mohammad Qasim Khan Zahir al-Dawla, to establish solidarity between the royal family and the Davallu cadet branch of the Qajar dynasty. The marriage, which took place in September 1819, was loveless. As a result of the recurring deaths of their infants, Mohammad Mirza developed resentment towards Malek Jahan. Of their children, only Naser al-Din Mirza, who later became the crown prince and then king of Iran; and Ezzat ed-Dowleh, who married Amir Kabir, later the chief minister of Naser al-Din Shah; survived into adulthood.

=== Early military career ===
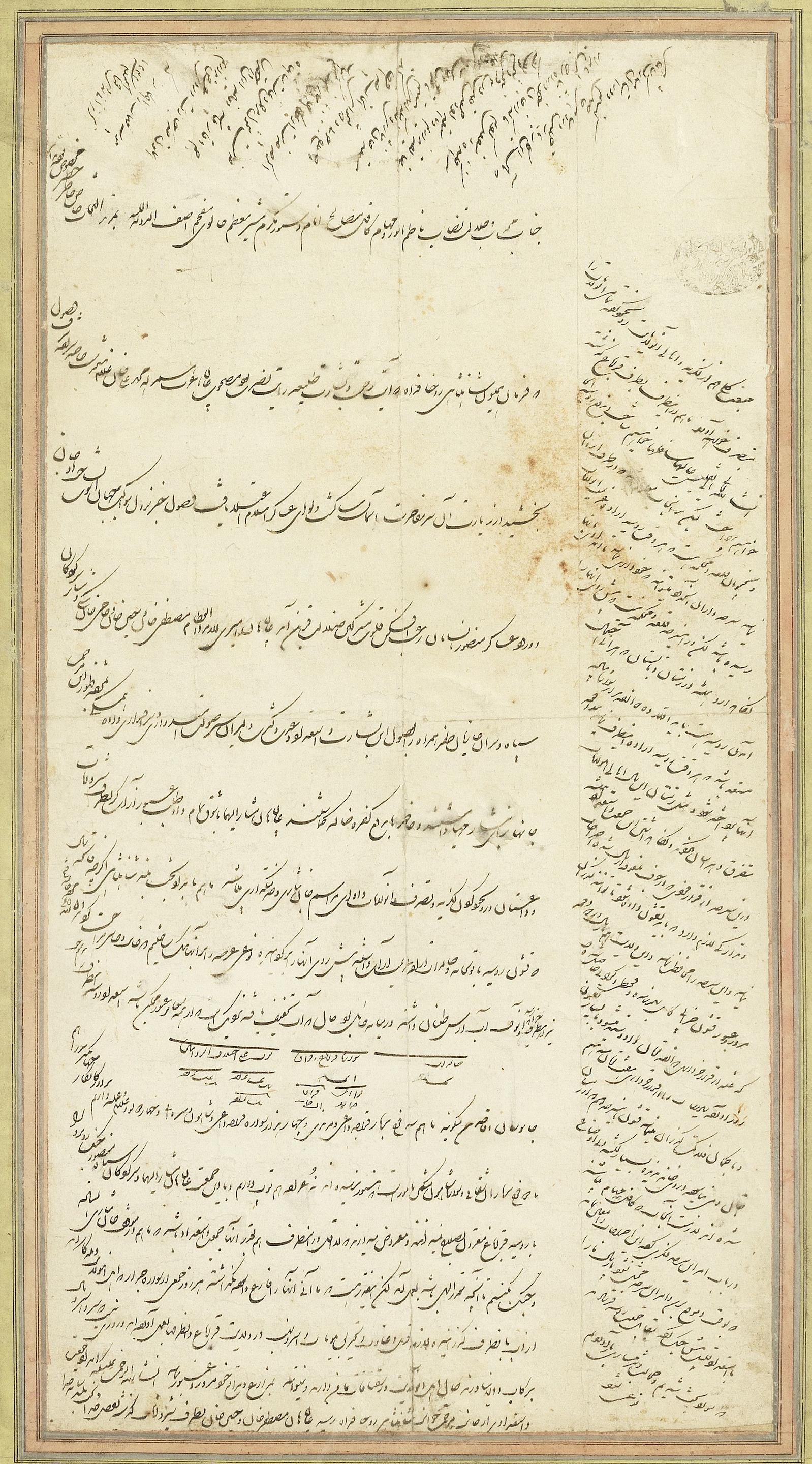
June–July 1827 letter from Prince Mohammad Mirza in Persian to his uncle Allahyar Khan (Asef ol-Dowleh), reporting on all the events in the north-west regions around Karabakh and asking for additional troops to protect the border from the Russians

The Second Russo-Iranian War began with the declaration of jihad by the Shiite clerics. During the war, Abbas Mirza sent Mohammad Mirza with an army consisting of the tribes of Khajevandi and Abdul Maliki to protect the fortress of Ganja. There, under the command of Amir Khan Sardar, Abbas Mirza's maternal uncle, Mohammad launched an attack on the Russian army. In the resulting battle, Amir Khan was killed and Mohammad was severely defeated and forced to retreat; he, however, was praised for his efforts during the war and was nicknamed a Gazi (warrior of Islam). After the war, Fath Ali Shah appointed Abbas Mirza to rule Khorasan and regulate the security of that area, which suffered constant raids by Prince Kamran, whom the Iranian government had previously appointed as the governor of Herat and who now styled himself "Shah". Mohammad Mirza also accompanied his father on this trip. In one of his missions, Mohammad released nearly 20,000 Iranians held captive by Central Asian Sunni tribes; in honor of this victory, he named his newborn child "Naser al-Din" (defender of the faith).

Abbas Mirza spent two years in Khorasan suppressing rebel khans; Khiva and Herat supported these revolts and promised aid but Mohammad's victories discouraged them. In 1832, Abbas Mirza summoned Kamran Shah, the ruler of Herat, to pay tribute, but Kamran instead sent his vizier Yar Mohammad Khan. Feeling insulted, Abbas Mirza sent Mohammad Mirza with an army to Herat. Mohammad Mirza advanced directly to Herat and prepared for a siege. Meanwhile, Abbas Mirza was on his way with reinforcements when he suddenly died in Mashhad. (Note: In his farewell letter to his son, Abbas Mirza advised Mohammad Mirza to remain loyal to Fath-Ali Shah. He also reminded him to have forgiveness, justice, and compassion, respect the ulama and the descendants of the prophet (the sayyids), and lastly, reward the servants of his household.) Upon hearing the news, Mohammad Mirza and Abol-Qasem Qa'em-Maqam, who was also a leading figure in the siege, were forced to negotiate with Kamran. It was agreed that Kamran would accept the sovereignty of Iran, pay 15,000 tomans in gold and fifty Kashmir shawls, and release the Iranian prisoners who had been captured during the war. Mohammad appointed his brother Ghahreman Mirza as the governor of Khorasan and, with Qa'em-Maqam, went to Tehran to claim the title of crown prince.

== Accession ==
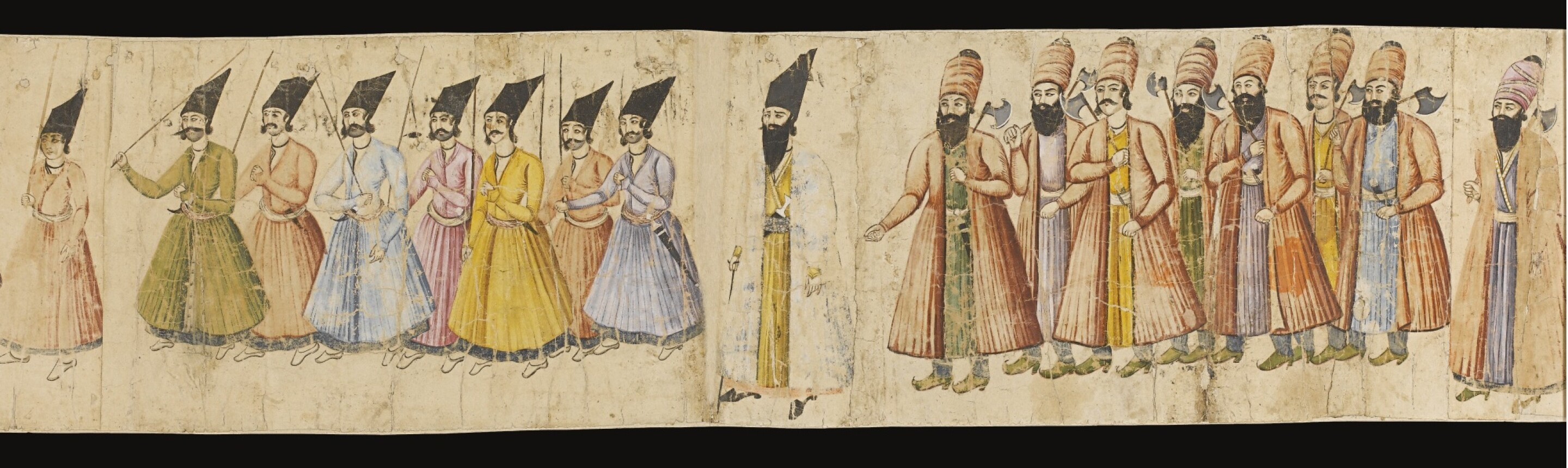
A pictorial scroll depicting the coronation procession of Mohammad Shah Qajar, dated 1835

At Nowruz (Iranian New Year, which is held at the March equinox) of 1834, Mohammad Mirza was appointed the crown prince and took the governorship of Azarbaijan—the office of his father—and left Tehran for Tabriz. As crown prince, Mohammad Mirza was under the complete influence of Qa'em-Maqam, on whose orders, he imprisoned four of his brothers, including Djahangir Mirza and Khosrow Mirza, in Hamadan and later blinded them to invalidate their claims to the throne. (Note: Mohammad Mirza later awarded the man who blinded his brothers with the title of Khan and a piece of land.) The appointment of Mohammad as the crown prince angered Fath-ali Shah's fifth son Hossein Ali Mirza, the Prince-Governor of Fars, who thought the appointment would deprive him of his rights and was a sign of submission to Russian demands.

In October 1834, Fath-Ali Shah, with the intention of collecting 200,000 tomans of tax arrears from Hossein Ali Mirza, went to Fars but died en route at Isfahan. Couriers were quickly sent to Tabriz but otherwise, the shah's death remained secret. His body was then taken to the Fatima Masumeh Shrine for burial; only then was the death publicly announced. As expected, his death sparked revolts across the country, and a number of princes, including Hossein Ali Mirza in Shiraz and Ali Mirza Zel as-Soltan in Tehran, proclaimed themselves kings.

In early November, John Campbell and Comte Ivan Simonich, the British and Russian envoys, arrived in Tabriz to proclaim their support for Mohammad Mirza. They provided him an army led by Col. Henry Lindsay Bethune that set off for Tehran, where Ali Mirza had proclaimed himself king. Mohammad's army met 15,000 of Ali Mirza's men, who were led by Ali's brother Emamverdi Mirza, at Takestan, west of Qazvin. After a brief confrontation, Emamverdi Mirza sought to surrender and pledge fealty to Mohammad. The new king agreed to waive his uncles' punishment. In early 1835, Mohammad entered the capital with Qa'em-Maqam, his courtiers and Russian and British ambassadors, and was crowned king on 14 January.

In February 1835, Mohammad sent an army under the command of Manuchehr Khan Gorji to liberate Isfahan from Hossein Ali Mirza's forces, who were under the command of his brother Shoja al-Saltanah. After reconquering Isfahan, Manuchehr Khan Gorji marched to Shiraz, where he captured Hossein Ali Mirza and ended his rebellion. Hossein Ali was imprisoned in Ardabil and soon died of cholera; with his defeat, the other rebel princes surrendered their claims and recognized Mohammad as the king of Iran.

== Reign as Shah ==
=== Early years ===
Mohammad Shah appointed Qa'em-Maqam as his grand vizier. Qa'em-Maqam's efforts in budgeting and his disdain for the courtiers made him an unpopular figure in the court. As soon as he had become the grand vizier, Qa'em-Maqam had the royal princes swear an oath of fealty to Mohammad, otherwise he would have them imprisoned. This fate befell many Qajar princes, such as Mahmud Mirza, the governor of Kashan, who refused to relinquish his claim and thus lost his title and wealth. Soon, Qa'em-Maqam was attacked by rivals, the most prominent being Allahyar Khan Asef ol-Dowleh—Mohammad Shah's uncle from the Davallu tribe—and a coalition led by Aqasi. Qa'em-Maqam's adversaries soon included British envoy John Campbell, who had expected grand privileges for his contribution to Mohammad's enthronement but had been denied by Qa'em-Maqam. To reduce British influence over the court, Qa'em-Maqam had tried to improve Iran's relations with the Ottoman Empire. His rivals, with slanderous accusations, urged Mohammad to have Qa'em-Maqam ousted from his position and Mohammad eventually agreed to do so. On 22 June 1835, he arrested and imprisoned Qa'em-Maqam in Negarestan Palace, and four days later he ordered Qa'em-Maqam's execution.

Mohammad Shah then spent a few months without a grand vizier. Campbell expressed his support for Mirza Abolhassan Khan Ilchi while his courtiers supported Abdollah Amin al-Dowleh, an erstwhile grand vizier of Fath-Ali Shah, but Mohammad chose Aqasi, who filled this position for most of Mohammad's reign. By this time, Mohammad's health had become a concern for the kingdom's future and the four-year-old Naser al-Din Mirza was appointed the crown prince. Mohammad Shah granted the governorship of Azarbaijan, which the Qajar kings bestowed upon their heir apparent, to his firstborn son Naser al-Din and appointed his brother Ghahreman Mirza as Naser al-Din's regent. Ghahreman Mirza was in close contact with the Russian government. After he died in 1841, Mohammad appointed his last-surviving full-brother, Bahman Mirza as his son's regent in 1842.

In 1837, a rebellion broke out in Kerman, led by Hassan Ali Shah, better known as Agha Khan I, the leader of the Nizari Ismailis. The Nizari Muslims, though few in number, lived in Iran under the leadership of Hassan Ali Shah, who asserted his power by marrying Fath-Ali Shah's daughter Sarveh Jahan Khanum, and acquiring the title of Aga Khan. When Mohammad Shah ascended the throne, on the advice of Qa'em Maqam, he had appointed Agha Khan as the governor of Kerman, a rebellious state that was governed by Shoja al-Saltanah, a brother of Hossein Ali Mirza. Agha Khan pacified the state but his governorship was short-lived; in 1837, he was recalled to Tehran and was replaced with Firouz Mirza, the shah's brother. Agha Khan declared a rebellion against the shah, and withdrew with his forces to Bam. Mohammad Shah sent an army under the command of Sourab Khan; they besieged Bam and took the severely injured brother of Agha Khan prisoner. After eight months, Agha Khan surrendered and was imprisoned; his belongings were plundered and he was not allowed to receive his religious dues sent from India, Khurasan and Badakhshan. Agha Khan was a prisoner of the shah until 1838, when he was allowed to retreat to his familial lands in Mahallat.

=== Herat campaign ===
After asserting his authority, Mohammad Shah's main objective was to annex Herat. This alarmed Kamran Shah and prompted him to attempt to gather the neighboring tribes such as the Jamshidi, Tumani and Hazara in Herat to fight Mohammad in the event of a military campaign. These mobilizations alarmed the British government, which sent Alexander Burnes and Eldred Pottinger to Kabul and Herat respectively. Iran wanted to retake Herat partly because of Mohammad's desire to liberate the Iranians who had been taken prisoner by the Sunni tribes who lived near Khorasan. Conquest of Herat was also the first step in a plan to extend Iran's influence up to the Amu Darya river. In late 1836, Mohammad ordered his army to be mustered for the following spring. This gave John McNeill, the British envoy in Iran, time to arrange a treaty in which Herat would resume paying tributes. Yar Mohammad Khan, however, would not tolerate Iranian sovereignty, and Mohammad Shah would not withdraw unless the city was conquered.

In 1837, Mohammad Shah marched on Herat. British officers were expelled from the Iranian army and the British embassy was closed. Mohammad took personal command of Iran's 80,000 troops, while Kamran Shah had gathered a few thousand poorly equipped soldiers. The ruler of Herat had little hope of resisting Mohammad Shah, because the city's population, who had been terrorized by their overlord and dispirited by economic decline, were unlikely to put up any fight. Also, the crumbling fortifications of the city's walls were in disrepair and would not withstand an assault. Kamran Shah's only source of hope was the support of Sher Mohammad Khan Hazara, the Amir of Qala e Naw, who vowed to fight to the death for Kamran Shah, and brought about 4,000 foot soldiers and numerous horsemen to Herat's army. Sher Mohammad Khan Hazara also organized an alliance between the Aimaq, Uzbek and Turkman tribes under the banner of Sunni Islam. Thus, under the leadership of Sher Mohammad and Kamran Shah's son Nader Mirza, ten to twelve thousand horsemen had assembled around Qala-e Naw and threatened to attack Iran's borders.

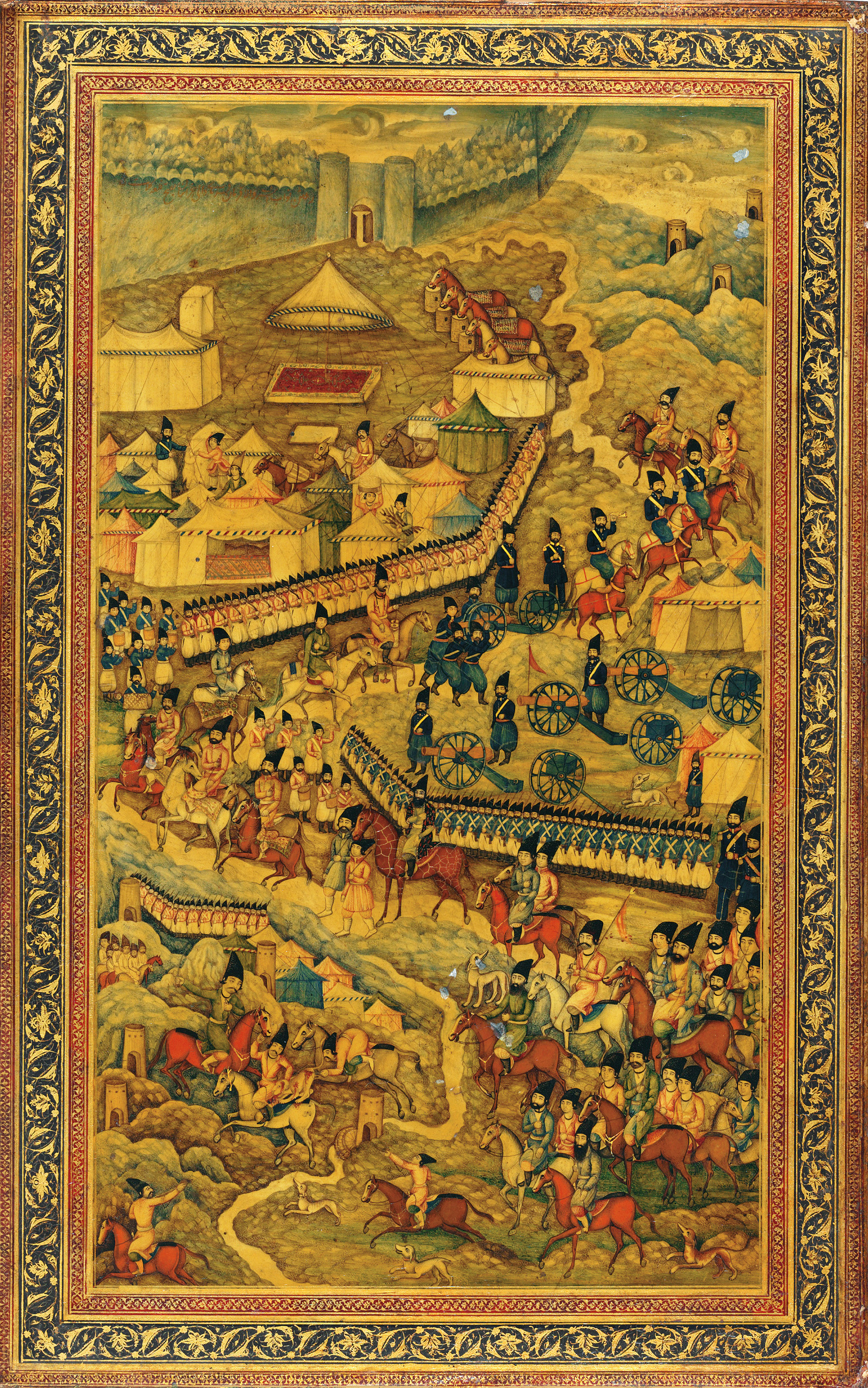
A Qajar lacquer book cover, attributable to the painter Muhammad Ismail, depicting preparations for the Siege of Herat.

On 28 October, Mohammad Shah camped at Torbat-e Jam, and in order to counterattack, he ordered 12,000 of his best soldiers under the command of Mohammad Khan Asef al-Dowleh, the governor of Khorasan, to march to Qala e Naw. By the middle of November, he had seized the city and its surroundings, dividing Sher Mohammad's army into two; one part was camped in Kushk under the command of Mohammad Zaman Jamshidi and the other was already retreating to Herat. The Jamshidi army faced Asef al-Dowleh's men and were scattered in a desperate fight; two to three hundred men were killed and as many taken prisoner. Despite their victory, the Iranian army faced difficulties, suffering from the winter cold that reached the mountains much earlier than it reached Herat, and a shortage of supplies that could only be purchased at high prices. Eventually, Asaf al-Dowleh and his men marched through the mountains to Bala Murghab and from there to Maymana, where he defeated another host of the Afghan army under the command of Sher Mohammad Khan. After this victory, Asaf al-Dowleh sent an ambassador to his opponent's camp, and promised them freedom and wealth if they surrendered to Mohammad Shah. His offer was received positively and Sher Mohammad agreed to send two of his sons to Herat to proffer their submission to Mohammad Shah.

On 23 November, Mohammad Shah with a part of his army reached the outskirts of Herat, where they faced fierce resistance from the defenders but eventually forced them to retreat behind the city walls. Mohammad Shah set up his camp south-east of Herat and began a long siege of the city. The Iranian army were divided in opinion; Aqasi wanted to wait for Russian aid whereas Mirza Aqa Khan Nuri had argued for crushing the city walls. Mohammad Shah faced problems feeding his men; his army quickly ran out of supplies, and the lines back to Mashhad were insecure and often impassable. The fields around Herat had already been harvested by the residents and the remains had been destroyed. The problem was only solved after the spring of 1838, when Mohammad Shah ordered his men to plant their crops.

In March 1838, John McNeill arrived at Mohammad Shah's camp as the British representative; he failed to dissuade Mohammad and thus on 7 June 1838, he withdrew from Herat. Ten days later, the British Indian fleet from Bombay occupied Kharg Island and threatened further military action. Under pressure to end the campaign, Mohammad Shah ordered a full-scale assault on Herat, which failed with many casualties. The British sent an ultimatum threatening war if the siege continued. The Russians abandoned Mohammad Shah's cause and withdrew their support. These circumstances, along with news of rebellions, led Mohammad Shah to give up his campaign and end the siege. Although he had failed to conquer Herat, Mohammad's army still occupied Ghurian and other forts; and a number of Afghan members of the Barakzai dynasty such as Kohan Dil Khan of the Principality of Kandahar would remain loyal to Mohammad Shah.

=== Rebellion in Isfahan ===
Mohammad Bagher Shafti was one of the most distinguished religious figures of his time; with a fortune of two and a half million francs (equivalent to 2809.43 million French francs in 2025). Shafti rebelled against Mohammad Shah in 1834, when he tried to seize the city Isfahan from its Prince-Governor Sayf ol-Dowleh. Over four years, Shafti took control of the city's Luti population, and in 1838, he rebelled against the governor of the city, Gholam Hossein Khan Sepahdar, and therefore Mohammad Shah. Shafti's men, who were known for their acts of murder, robbery and rape, looted the city and took the booty to the Jameh Mosque of Isfahan. There, Shafti declared their leader Ramazan as Ramazan Shah and ordered the striking of coins in his name. The roots of this revolt lay in a letter from McNiell to Shafti, in which he implied the cause of the war in Herat was the Shah's warmongering and obduracy. The rebellion was supported by a Safavid descendant called Nawab Safavi, which further encouraged the rebels to kill the city's deputy governor.

As a result, between 1838 and 1840, Isfahan was in the hands of rebels, especially the Lutis, whose numbers were increasing as the city's poor population joined their cause. To end their rebellion, Mohammad Shah went to Isfahan with 60,000 troops on the return journey from Herat. It was unprecedented for the shah to take arms against the state's clergy, especially Shafti, who was considered a clergy leader and because Isfahan was regarded as the religious capital of Iran. Modern historian Homa Nategh argued that this act was a "coup d'état".

Upon reaching the city, Mohammad Shah ordered the cannons to bombard Isfahan. Shafti, fearing great losses, opened the city's northern gate and the Lutis deserted from the southern gate. Mohammad Shah triumphantly entered the city and instantly ordered the execution of the remaining Lutis. He could not punish Shafti with any extreme measures but had exiled his son to Astrabad. The Luti leader Ramazan Shah died under torture, and of his men, 240 were killed and 400 were arrested. Mohammad Shah set up a court for people to recount the Lutis' crimes. He took the lands and the properties Shafti and the Lutis had usurped, and incorporated them in his demesne lands. Harsh penalties were imposed to ensure stability and fear, and to prevent future rebellions. Mohammad Shah celebrated his victory greatly, trying to erase the memory of his failure in Herat. To declare Shafti's cause blasphemy, Mohammad Shah reaffirmed the title Ghazi (the warrior of Islam).

=== The Second Treaty of Erzurum ===
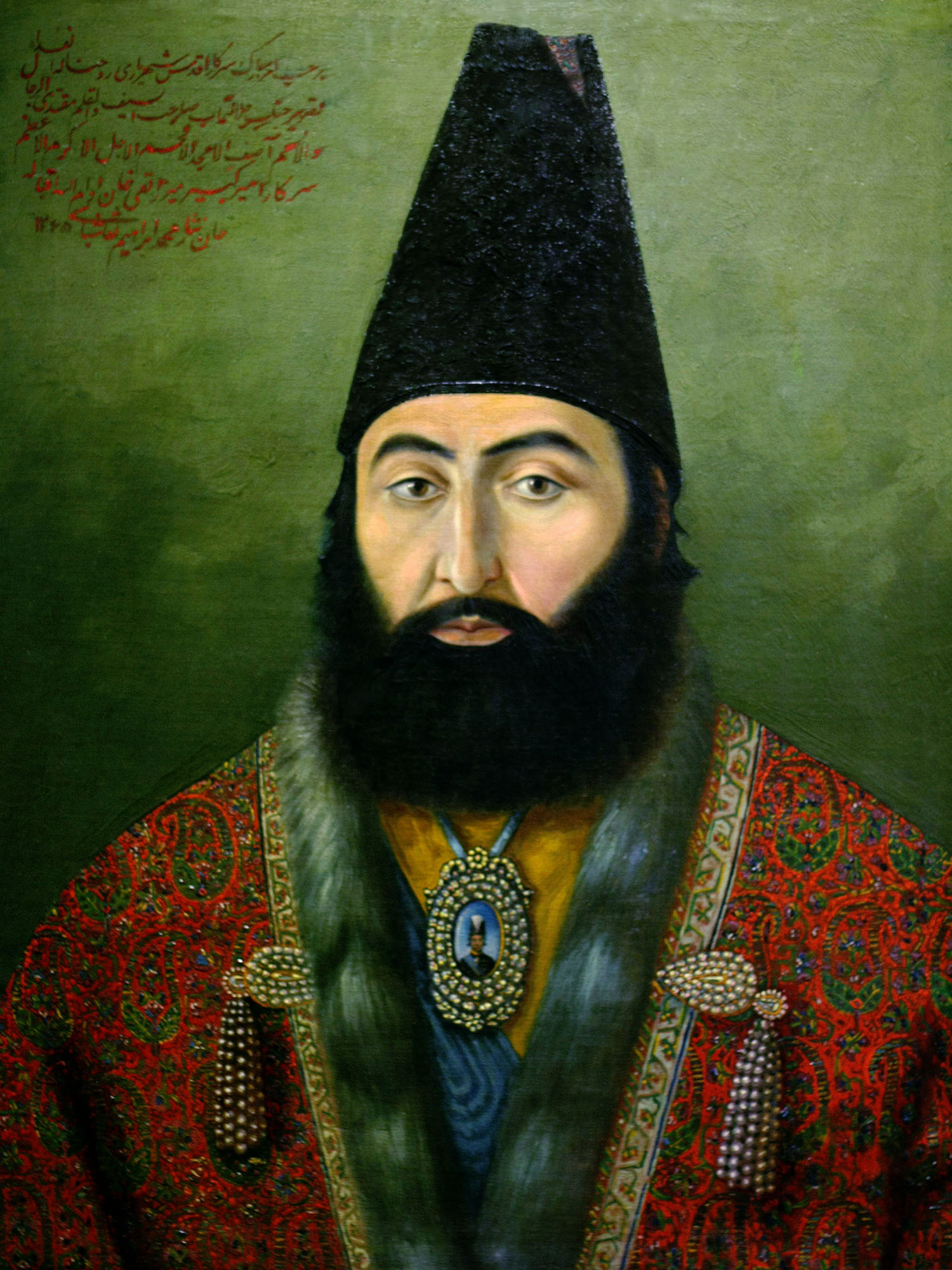
Mirza Taghi Khan Farahani, later known as Amir Kabir, the leading Iranian figure in the negotiations.

Hostilities with the Ottomans and tensions over the borderlands of the two empires had not been resolved by the treaty of Erzurum and later led to incidents during Mohammad Shah's reign that pushed him to start a war, such as the sack of Khorramshahr by Ali Reza Pasha, the governor of Baghdad, in 1837. In the early 1840s, peace in the frontier of Iran and the Ottoman Empire became a prioritized European project. Negotiations between the two nations began in 1842 in Erzurum, a sizeable frontier town. The Iranian commission included Mirza Taqi Khan Farahani, later known as Amir Kabir, whose involvement in the treaty got him the attention of political circles. On the Ottoman side was Enveri Sadullah Efendi, a member of the Supreme Council of Justice, whose arrogance and occasional undiplomatic language created so many problems that he was once considered to be replaced. Negotiations began on 15 May 1843; Mohammad Shah had demanded that the Iranian plenipotentiaries resolve the negotiations quickly or he would raise arms against the Ottoman Empire. Negotiations lasted for four years, mostly because of delays caused by political and military crises such as the Ottoman massacre of 22,000 Shi'i Iranian pilgrims on the road to Karbala that caused the suspension of the negotiations for three months.

Negotiations were resumed by British and Russian mediators. Territorial restitution was confined to the cities of Khorramshahr, Zohab and Sulaymaniyah, and the Iranian dominance over the Shatt al-Arab river. Ownership of Zohab was a heated argument between negotiators; the town, which was insignificant in itself, had been captured by Mohamad Ali Mirza Dowlatshah, the firstborn son of Fath-Ali Shah, during the Ottoman-Persian war of 1821. Iran had retained sovereignty over it even though it had agreed to cede it in the First Treaty of Erzurum. Farahani suggested that Zohab be divided between the two nations, but the Iranian party later agreed to cede the town to the Ottomans who, in return, would forsake their desire to dominate the Shatt al-Arab's trade route. When the commissioners began discussing Khorramshahr, Farahani declared that the town had always been part of Khuzistan and demanded £1 million (equivalent to £101 million in 2025) in compensation for the 1837 sack of the city. Despite the Ottoman protests and arguments, Khorramshahr was determined to be a part of Iran after Farahani's firm efforts.

In May 1846, the first drafts of the treaty were written. Russia and Britain were to draw up a map of the border areas, and both parties would accept it. In the meantime, Farahani fell ill and a riot broke out in Erzurum, his house was looted and two of his companions were killed by rebels. Negotiations were suspended for several months. The Ottoman government formally apologized to Iran, imprisoned 300 rioters and paid 15,000 tomans in compensation. Afterwards, negotiations resumed and resulted in a treaty with nine articles. The Ottoman party, however, were unsatisfied with the outcome and threatened to leave the negotiations. The mediators, determined to avoid such results, secretly gave assurances to the Ottomans. On 31 May 1847, Farahani and Efendi signed the treaty and left Erzurum, and on 26 June, Mohammad Shah also ratified the treaty.

While the tensions seemed to be resolved, the Ottoman government had secretly added three more articles to the treaty with the support of British and Russian ambassadors. Based on these articles, Iran's rights to the Shatt al-Arab were revoked and those to Khorramshahr were reduced. Contrary to the agreements, control of Shatt al-Arab, except for a few islands, was handed to the Ottoman Empire. At the end of January 1848, Mirza Javad, a courier from Tehran, arrived in Constantinople with Mohammad Shah's ratified copies of the treaty; the Ottoman government insisted they would not ratify the treaty unless the shah agreed to the new articles. Not wanting to make Mohammad Shah suspicious, the British and Russian ambassadors persuaded Mirza Mohammad-Ali Khan Shirazi, Iran's envoy to France who was in Constantinople at the time, to ratify the new articles, alternatively called the "Explanatory Note". Mirza Mohammad-Ali agreed, but only if the ambassadors signed an official statement in which they would inform Mohammad Shah that the new articles were necessary for maintaining the treaty. Mohammad Shah did not accept the new terms and declared the treaty false and invalid. The tensions between Iran and the Ottomans persisted even after the fall of the Ottoman Empire when the newly established country of Iraq inherited the Ottoman claims against Iran.

=== Prohibition of slavery in the Persian Gulf ===
In the 1840s, an estimated four to five thousand slaves were sold in the Persian Gulf each year. When Justin Sheil succeeded John McNiel as the envoy to Iran in 1844, he and his wife decided to act against the slavery. He sent a letter to Aqasi and pleaded for an abolition. Mohammad Shah, however, did not respond to this diplomatic pressure, so Sheil brought up the moral aspect of slavery, emphasizing its negative impacts on the African population. Mohammad Shah remained unmoved and said abolition would contradict the Islamic tradition. Sheil further argued his points but Mohammad responded that such interference would undermine the diplomatic relations between the two nations.

In late 1847, Sheil was recalled to London and replaced with Colonel Francis Farrant, who also negotiated for abolition with Aqasi. Farrant was more successful, especially due to the newly signed treaty of Erzurum that had put him in a good light for the grand vizier. Farrant argued that if the Ottoman Empire could abolish slavery in their nation, Iranians could do the same. The argument appealed to Aqasi, who suggested it to Mohammad Shah. Mohammad wrote this to Farrant regarding the abolition of slavery in the Ottoman Empire:

Between the religions of Europe and our religion there is great distinction and difference, and we cannot observe or join in matters which are in accordance with their religion and in opposition to ours, why we wrote that the exalted English government should make enquiries of the Turkish government on this subject, was because that government being a Mahomedan state and in that country the traffic in slaves being much more extensive than any where else, we might observe what answer it will give, that then we may give a reply which should not be opposed to tenets of the Mahomedan faith.

Mohammad Shah agreed to the abolition of the slave trade through the Persian Gulf, but owning slaves and trading them over land was still allowed. On Mohammad's behest, Aqasi sent three letters to the governors of Fars, Kerman, and Isfahan, ordering the governors not to partake in the slave trade in the Persian Gulf. On the advice of both Sheil and Farrant, Aqasi also approached the major ulama of Tehran to ask their consent should the slave traders accuse them of blasphemy. The results were unfavorable; most of the ulama regarded slavery as legal according to Mohammedan law. Mohammad's order to prohibit the slave trade was not impactful and the trade continued until final abolishment in 1929.

=== Last years and death ===
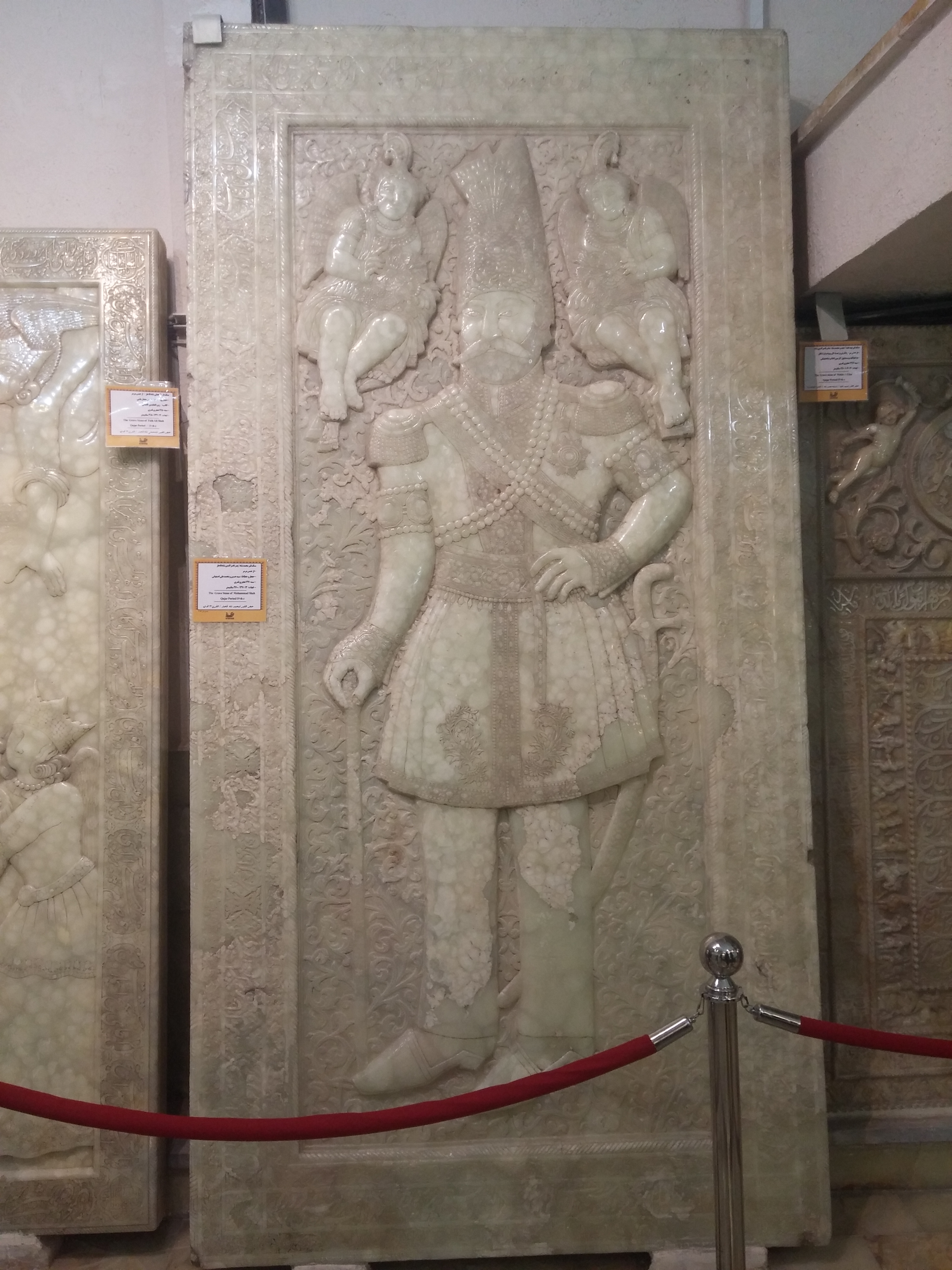
Mohammad Shah's grave stone at the Fatima Masumeh Shrine

Throughout his life, Mohammad Shah had suffered from gout and endured its recurrent attacks. Influenced by Aqasi, he had refused to be treated by European doctors, and instead trusted the traditional treatment of a fraudster, which gave him a severe paroxysm, due to which Mohammad became so weak that rumours of his impending death spread throughout Tehran. He recovered but lost the use of one leg. Aqasi, however, refused to let any foreign-trained physicians, especially English ones, approach Mohammad; only two French doctors, Dr. Labat and Dr. Ernest Cloquet, were allowed to treat him. Under Labat's care, Mohammad recovered somewhat but was still so feeble that he could only move with the help of two persons. Becoming infirm and debilitated, Mohammad lost the will to rule; he handed over the government to Aqasi, leading to political and social turmoil.

Mohammad's dire health prompted the foreign powers to declare their support for Mohammad's eldest son Naser al-Din Mirza in February 1842. Bahman Mirza, who had previously served as the regent for Naser al-Din Mirza, began mobilizing forces at Tabriz, in hopes of becoming Naser al-Din's regent once again after Mohammad's death. Bahman Mirza had support from Count Medem and John McNeill, the Russian and British envoys respectively, but the British withdrew their support when Sheil succeeded McNeill; but the Russians continued to consider Bahman Mohammad's successor. To counteract the Russians, in 1845, Aqasi arranged a marriage for Naser al-Din Mirza with the daughter of Ahmad Ali Mirza, a son of Fath-Ali Shah. This wedding brought the young prince into the political spectrum. Mohammad's health slightly improved, and the realm and its succession seemed stable and secure. Rebellions, however, broke out in Khorasan, one of which was led by Hasan Khan Salar in support of Bahman Mirza's claim; another was led by Allah-Qoli Khan Ilkhani, a grandson of Fath-Ali Shah through his mother and a protégé of Aqasi to press his own claim. Both rebellions continued after Mohammad's death into the early years of Naser al-Din Shah's rule.

After Mohammad abdicated his role in the government, Aqasi's influence on him increased. Aqasi, now Iran's most powerful figure, was also becoming avaricious in his position and was less inclined to govern because he was addicted to opium. Mohammad, thinking highly of Aqasi, was happy to let him govern as he liked. In mid-to-late 1848, Mohammad suffered a combination of gout and erysipelas, from which it was clear he would not recover. Mohammad Shah Qajar died at around 21:00 on 4 September 1848. He was buried at the Fatima Masumeh Shrine located in Qom and his tomb was placed near the shrine's sanctuary.

== Policies ==
=== Religion ===
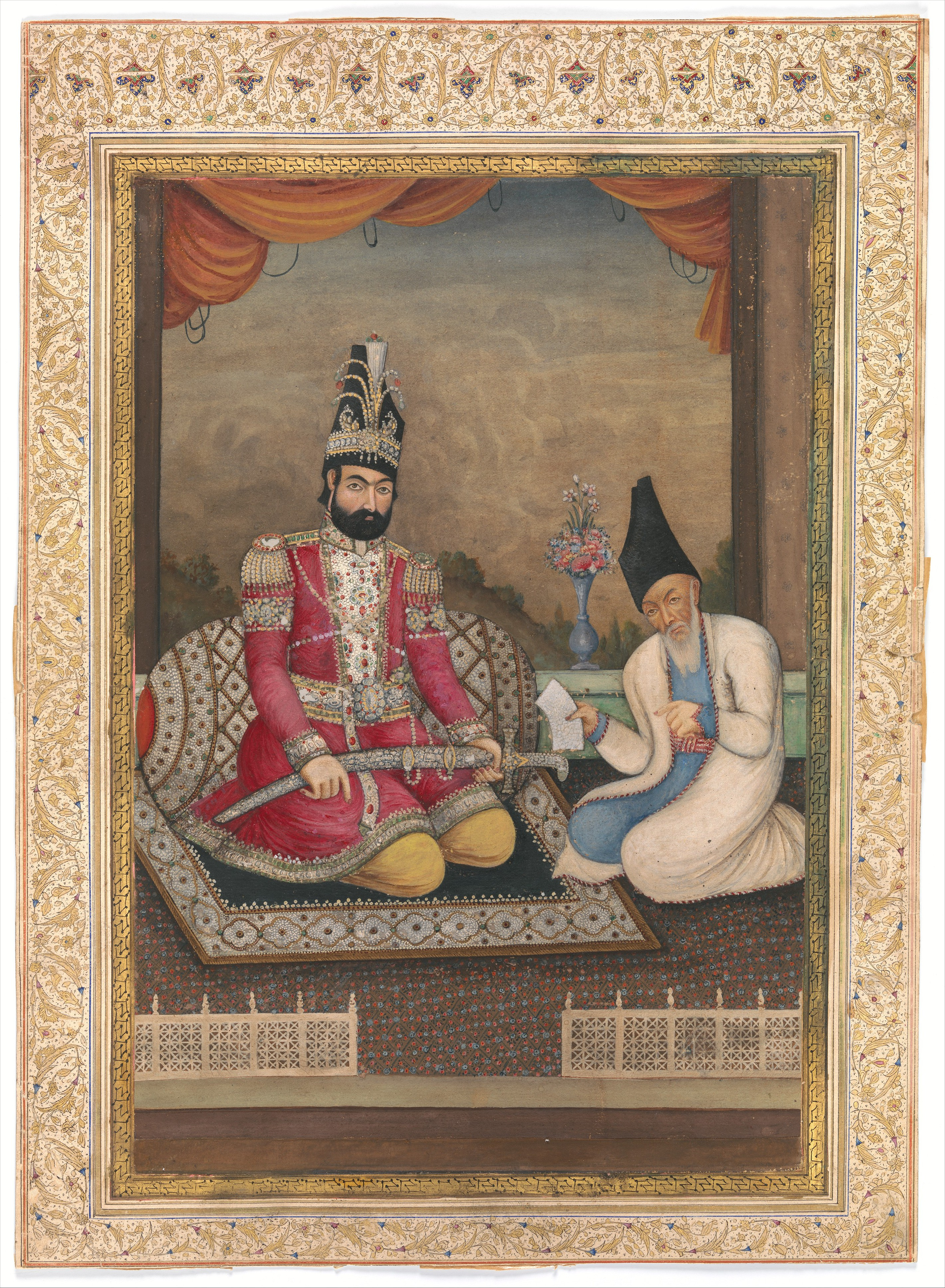
Portrait of Mohammad Shah and Haji Mirza Aqasi, second quarter of the nineteenth century. In the eyes of the shah, he was a murid (novice) and Aqasi his murshid (teacher).

For his patronage of Sufism, Mohammad Shah was compared to Ismail I, the Safavid shah who had made Twelver Shi'ism the official religion of Iran. Mohammad denoted Sufi Islam as the rival of the Shi'ia and ulama. The Sufis, who were persecuted during Fath-Ali Shah's reign, could now freely promote their beliefs. Mohammad was very dependent on his Sufi teacher Aqasi and gave court positions to Aqasi's Sufi friends like Mirza Mahdi Khui, who became chief scribe of the court. Concurrent with their new patronage, Sufis took the idea of the Hidden Imam from the Shi'ia and connected it to their Sufi saints. Figures such as Safi-ad-din Ardabili became messengers of the Hidden Imam and the Sufi murshids (spiritual guides) were the only knowledgeable people who could read these communications, often through dreaming. The Sufis despised acts of torture and violence; when Aqasi became the grand vizier, he pleaded for their reduction. Mohammad would not accept these requests in his early years, arguing that a culprit does not deserve sympathy, but as he aged and grew weaker from gout, he ordered the complete abolition of torture.

Mohammad's approach to the Shi'ia clergy was one of hostility and conflict. He abandoned Fath-Ali Shah's attempts to meet the demands of the clergy. He never asked for a theoretical acknowledgment of his coronation and was more inclined to search his spiritual guide among the dervishes and Sufis than among the ulama of the state. On 24 November 1842, Mohammad issued a firman abolishing the rights of taking shelter in sanctuaries. He would constantly try to undermine the orthodox ulama's position through the promotion of Sufism, and with the rise of Báb and Bábism. When Sayyid Ali Muhammad Shirazi first claimed to be the Báb (gateway to the Hidden Imam), the ulama declared a fatwa saying that he must be killed. Mohammad, however, called Báb to Tehran and promised him shelter. This alarmed Aqasi, who had Báb sent to Maku in Azerbaijan, where he was kept under confinement. Facing dissent from Mohammad, however, Aqasi took no drastic measures against Báb and his followers.

Although Mohammad had no enmity towards any branches of Christianity, he preferred to allow the French Lazarist missionaries into Iran rather than the English Anglicans. In the hope of bringing modern education to the nation, he issued an edict that allowed missionaries to open schools. The head of the Lazarists was Eugène Boré, who in 1839 opened a school in Tabriz with both Christian and Muslim students. Boré's school provoked unrest among the ulama of Tabriz, but as he was under the protection of Mohammad, they could not harm Boré.

=== Education ===
During his tenure as the governor of Azerbaijan, Abbas Mirza sent several students to France, mainly with the goal of improving the military. Mohammad Shah took his father's path and sent seven students of noble birth to Europe, among whom were Mirza Hosein Khan Sepahsalar, the future grand vizier of Naser al-Din Shah; and Mirza Malkam Khan, a prominent figure in the Iranian Enlightenment. These students were to master skills in military, painting, medicine, and geometry. Another 10 people were to be sent to France in 1847 but it is uncertain if they were ever sent.

In 1837, on the orders of Mohammad, Mirza Saleh Shirazi published the first Iranian newspaper in Tehran. This newspaper was untitled and was referred to as the Kaghaz-e Akhbar (literary news-paper). Many lithographic printing presses were established in Tehran, Urmia, Tabriz and Isfahan on the orders of Mohammad.

=== Administration ===
As a result of various wars and the continual unrest throughout Iran, Mohammad Shah's treasury was virtually empty. In the hope of improving financial conditions, he sought to revive barren fields that had been burned during the wars with Russia and the local insurgencies. He asked the French foreign minister for a French irrigation expert but nothing came of it. With Mohammad's efforts, however, 1,438 villages—which were part of the royal domain—were made habitable. Mohammad inherited many domain lands from Fath-Ali Shah and Agha Mohammad Khan, and he greatly increased the number of such lands. He confiscated the properties of Aqasi and the properties seized by the Lutis during the Isfahan rebellion, an act which was disliked by major landowners. On his orders, the number of the royal domains were recorded in the Raqabat-e Mohammadshahi, which also included all previous inventories.

Most of these domains were given to the villagers and the nomads who wanted settlements. A part of Nader Shah's personal domains were returned to the Afshar tribe, who had inherited the claims to these lands once the Afsharid dynasty died out. Despite granting two crores of land per person, many of these lands still belonged to the crown and were under the purposeful maladministration of the contemporary Mostowfi ol-Mamalek (royal treasurer). Mohammad was unable to return more of them and his successor, Naser al-Din Shah, completely ignored the Afshar people's pleas and petitions. The same Mostowfi ol-Mamalek secretly extorted money and forced villagers to pay taxes.

Mohammad reinstated governmental positions that had once been part of the Safavid bureaucracy. They bore mixed results; improving the state's efficiency but leading to a corrupt administration that reached its peak during Naser al-Din Shah's reign. Positions such as the Mostowfi ol-Mamalek became hereditary and many holders of these offices accepted bribes for the lack of a regular salary. Aqasi enlarged governmental titles and promoted his kinsmen, thuz the once-rudimentary bureaucracy of Agha Mohammad Khan became filled with positions with the same duties but under different names.

=== Military ===
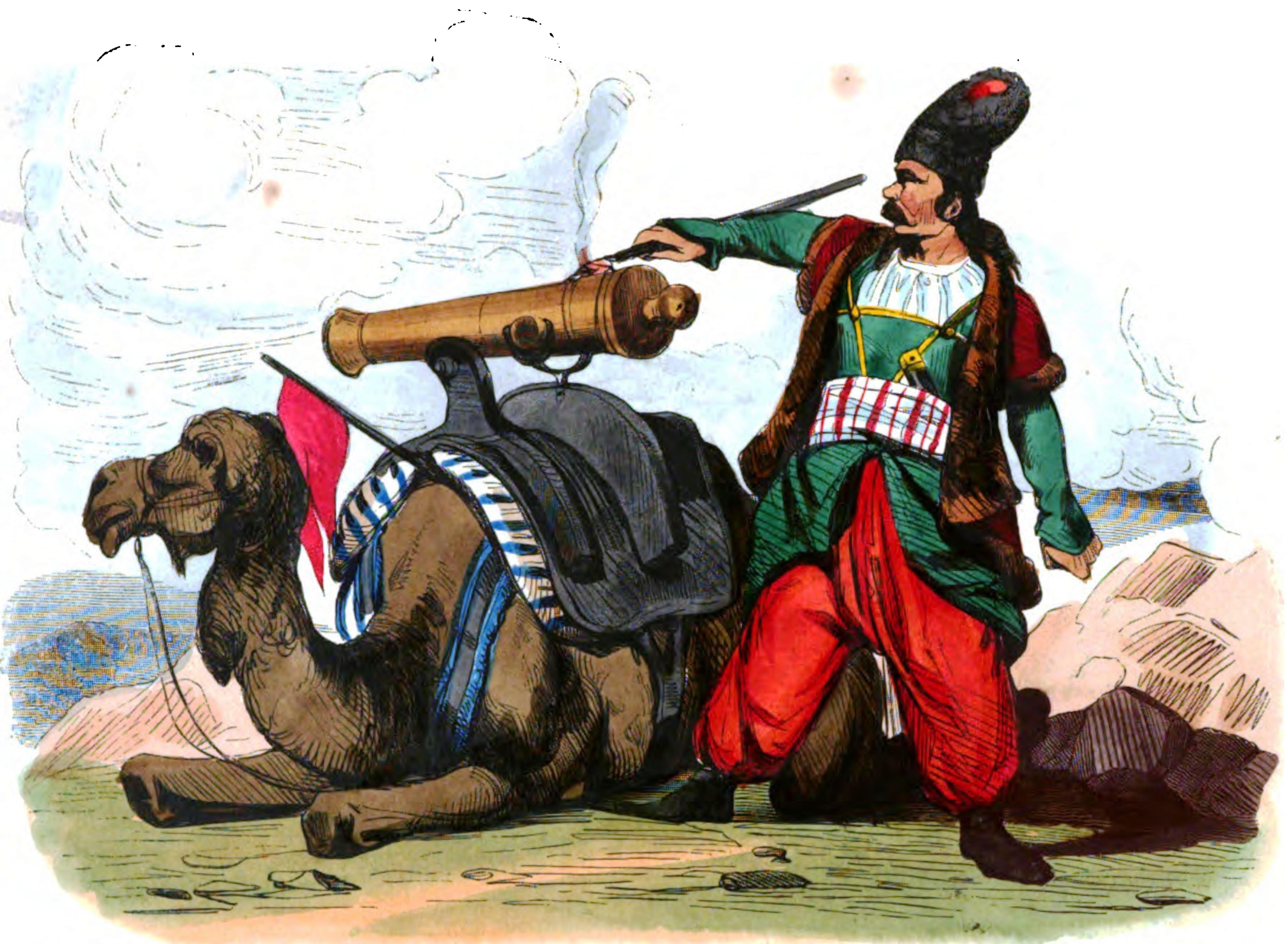
An Iranian gunner and a Zamburak, 1843

Mohammad Shah continued the military reforms his father had started; these included abolishing tribal cavalry and modeling it on Frederick the Great's cavalry using Western military technology on a very small scale with Abbas Mirza's personal army of 1,000 regular infantry and 500 regular cavalry.

When Mohammad Shah ascended the throne, the Iranian army was disorganized, undisciplined and rigidly hierarchical. Mohammad could hardly muster more than 20,000 men, and they were in poor shape. Instead of carts and wagons, transportation took place on mules, camels and horses. Other than Abbas Mirza's cavalry, the army was filled with tribal cavalry who recognized only their tribal chief. To counter these problems, Mohammad Shah and Aqasi put forth a three-staged plan which would centralize the command, create arsenals, and recover from the losses suffered in the wars with Russia. To create arsenals, he established the Tehran foundry, which provided his army with 600 bronze cannons, 200 mortars; and rifles, muskets and Zamburaks.

On Mohammad's request, Henry Rawlinson was sent to Kermanshah in April 1835 to train Bahram Mirza's troops in the style of the Nezam-e Jadid. The Italian F. Colombari reformed the Zamburak units of the Iranian army with the new cannon saddles and falconets he had designed for them.

=== Diplomacy ===
Despite his short reign, Mohammad Shah left a lasting mark on Iran's foreign policy. He had resentment towards Russia and Britain, even though both nations had supported him during his accession. The threat of the Russian military bordering Azerbaijan and their navy anchoring in the port of Anzali Lagoon put Mohammad Shah in a state of paranoia at the thought of another war. The Russians argued that per the Treaty of Turkmenchay they were free to anchor their ships in the Caspian Sea but neither Mohammad nor Aqasi considered Anzali part of the sea. To keep the Russian navy away, Mohammad ordered the troops at Anzali to shoot at the Russians if they approached. These events led to Nicholas I exchanging letters with Mohammad. From a diplomatic perspective, Mohammad had allowed the Russian navy to anchor at Anzali as a result of these exchanges. Another source of tension was the Russian merchants in Tabriz and Tehran who owed money to the Iranians but would not pay them in full. In 1843, Mohammad issued a firman ordering full payments of the debts by the Russians to prevent fraudulent bankruptcies.

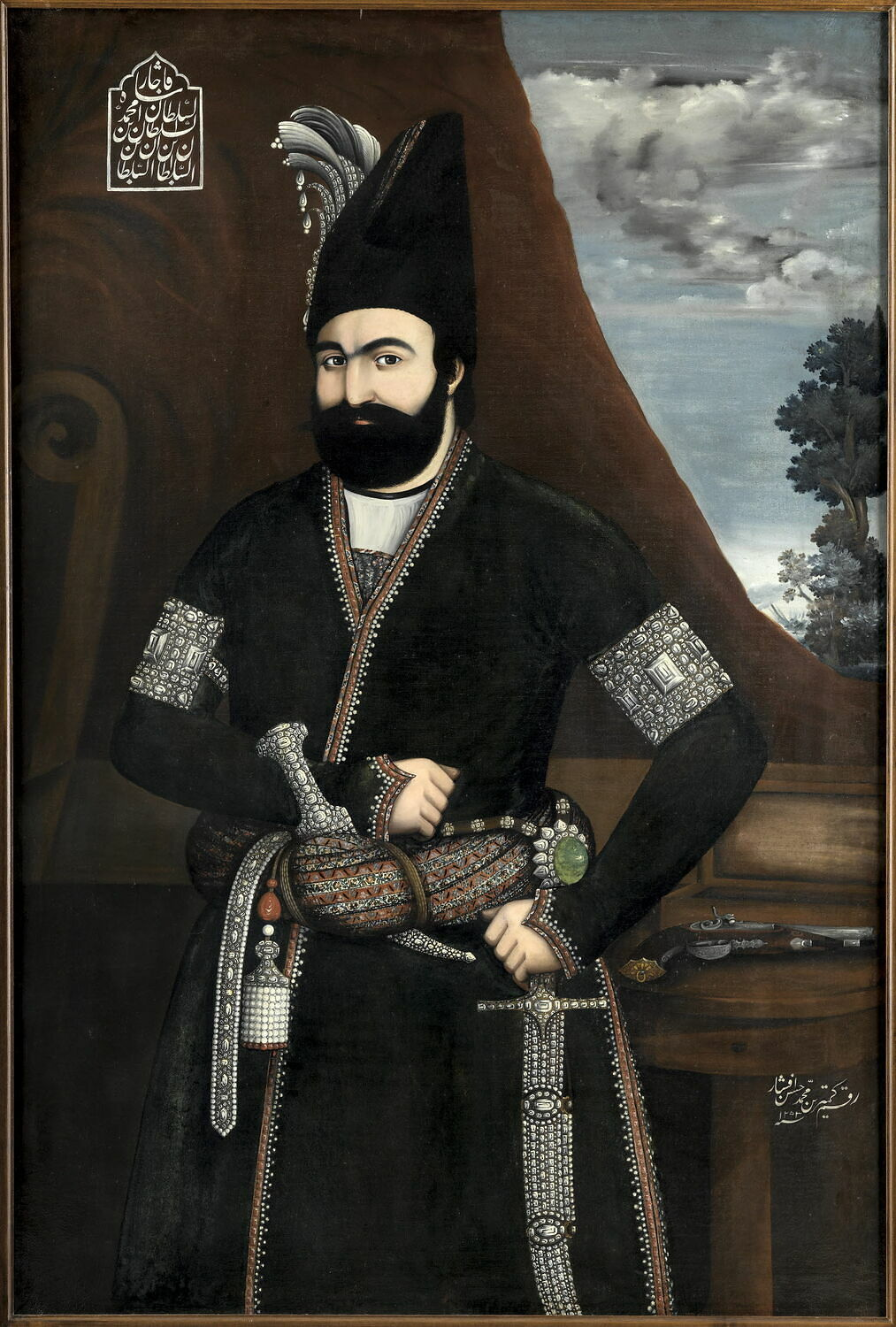
Portrait of Mohammad Shah, offered to King Louis Phillippe I in 1839 by Mirza Hossein Khan.

During his reign, various matters disturbed Anglo-Iranian relations, the most troublesome of which was Mohammad's campaign to Herat which led to the British, for the first time in their relations with Iran, invading Iran's southern islands in the Persian Gulf. In 1841, Mohammad signed a treaty with the British ambassador under which Britain could reopen their consulates in Tehran, Tabriz and Bushehr but had to withdraw from Kharg Island. This treaty was not ideal for either side; the British did not have the right to reside outside the three cities and their goal was to establish a consulate in Gilan near the Russian border. For Mohammad, the treaty was considered shameful and a surrender to his enemy's demands. After the signing of the agreement, inexpensive British goods entered Iran through the Tabriz-Trabzon trade zone and filled the country's markets, causing the bankruptcy of a number of Iranian businessmen in Tabriz. In 1844, Iranian merchants petitioned Mohammad to prohibit the import of European merchandise. The following year, traders from Kashan implored Mohammad to defend their manufacturers against European merchandise. Both cases were rejected.

Mohammad Shah was an avid Francophile and most excited to build diplomatic relations with France in lieu of Britain and Russia. As a child, Mohammad learned French from Madame de la Marininere, a tutor in the court of Abbas Mirza. He denoted French as the diplomatic language of Iran and ensured diplomats and ambassadors from other nations were fluent in French. In 1839, to resume political relations with France, Mohammad sent Mirza Hossein Khan to Paris, where Hossein Khan was brought before King of France Louis Philippe I. The Iranian delegation took with them numerous gifts to France, including a translation of the Shahnameh and the portrait of Mohammad, which is now kept in the Louvre Museum. On Mohammad's insistence, the French embassy in Iran was reopened and France–Iran relations resumed, resulting in Iran sending students to France, a tradition that has continued throughout modern Iranian history.

== Family ==
Ancestors of Mohammad Shah Qajar

8. Hossein Qoli Khan
4. Fath-Ali Shah
9. Agha Baji
2. Abbas Mirza
10. Fath-Ali Khan Davalu
5. Asyieh Khanum
1. Mohammad Shah
6. Mohammad Khan Davalu
3. Galin Khanum

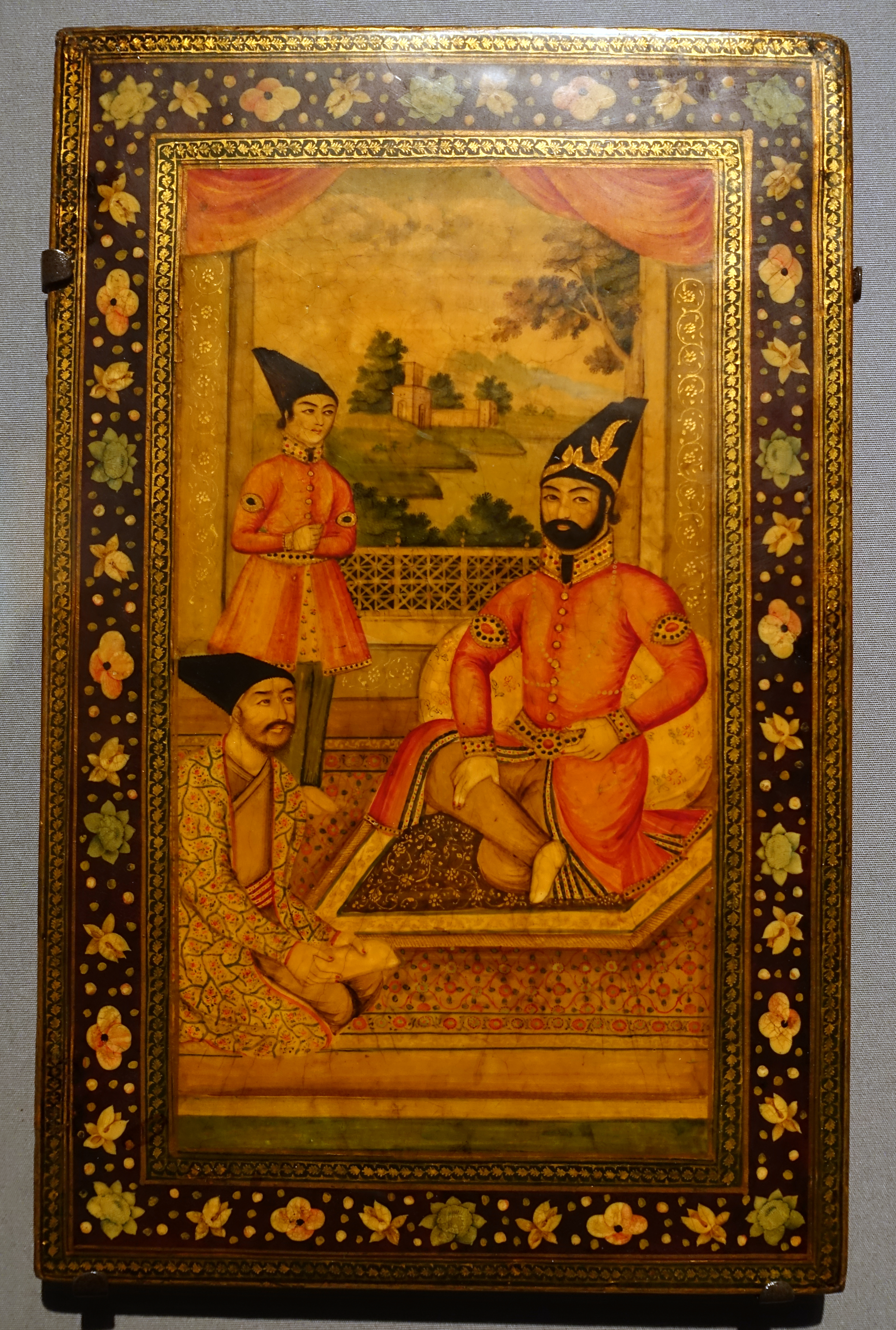
Mohammad Shah and Haji Mirza Aqasi attended by a young Naser al-Din Mirza, c. 1835–1840.

Mohammad Shah had a large harem, although his harem was smaller than that of other Qajar kings, either due to disliking sex with women or because of his severe illness. By the time he died, he had seven wives, with whom he had sired four sons and five daughters. Of his consorts, a woman named Khadija was Mohammad's favourite; they had his best-loved son Abbas Mirza III, who was named after Mohammad's father Abbas Mirza and a deceased son of the same name. Mohammad, however, never showed fatherly affection to his son with Malek Jahan Khanom, the future king Naser al-Din. In 1839, Mohammad summoned Naser al-Din to Tehran and treated him coldly. For most of his early childhood, Naser al-Din was no more than a nuisance for Mohammad and his grand vizier.

Of Mohammad Shah's seven wives, three of them are known to history:

- Malek Jahan Khanom (26 February 1805 – 2 April 1873); mother of Naser al-Din Shah and Malek Zadeh Khanum.
- Bolour Khanum Zandieh, the granddaughter of Karim Khan Zand. Mother of two daughters.
- Khadija, daughter of a Naqshbandi chief. Mother of Abbas Mirza III.

He had five sons:

- Naser al-Din Shah (16 July 1831 – 1 May 1896); Shah of Iran (r. 1848 – 1896)
- Abbas Mirza II, died in childhood.
- Abbas Mirza III (November 27, 1839 – April 13, 1897); known as Mulk Ara.
- Mohammad Taqi Mirza (d. 1901); known as Rokn ed-Dowleh, governor of several provinces.
- Abdol-samad Mirza (May 1843 – 21 October 1929); known as Ezz ed-Dowleh.

He had five daughters, four of whom are known:

- Malek Zadeh Khanum, (1834-35 – 27 June 1905); known as Ezzat ed-Dowleh, married five times, and was the grandmother of Mohammad Ali Shah.
- Ozra, daughter of Bolour Khanum Zandieh.
- Effat al-Dowleh, daughter of Bolour Khanum Zandieh.
- Aziz ol-Dowleh, married Fath-Ali Khan Saheb Divan.

== Historiography and personality ==
Mohammad Shah's 14-year reign resembles an interregnum between the reigns of Fath-Ali Shah and Naser al-Din Shah. During his reign, the ulama possessed little influence over the crown. Mohammad was heavily influenced by Sufi theology as a result of his close friendship with and reliance on Aqasi. His corresponding negligence of his relations with the Shi'ia ulama was the most lasting aspect of his reign. Mohammad had a passive character, was withdrawn from everyday life, and most of the time was physically unwell; he relied on Aqasi to govern while taking a ceremonial role himself. The extent of Aqasi's influence over Mohammad increased in Mohammad's last years, when he became very dependent on his grand vizier; Aqasi, however, proved to be a poor ruler, and mismanaged the economy and military. Mohammed's reign saw costly wars and maladministration, and by the end of it Iran suffered from instability, turmoil, and chaos.

Most historians present Mohammad as sedentary and aloof from governmental matters, an image that is accurate when applied to his later years. In his youth, though, Mohammad was an active soldier like his father and his grandfather. He was more Europeanised than his ancestors; Mohammad's dress contrasted the more traditional appearance of Fath-Ali Shah, who wore Persian ornamented long robes, high heels and a long beard. Mohammed wore semi-Europeanised dress and maintained a short beard. Travel writer James Baillie Fraser, who met Mohammad in 1834, described him as "the worthiest of all the numerous descendants of Fath-Ali Shah, particularly in the points of moral and private character". Mohammad was the last Qajar shah to lead his army into war. He was praised for his bravery; the contemporaneous historian Mohammad Taqi Sepehr wrote: "Until now, in Shiʿite realms, I never heard about a sovereign endowed with such a pure nature and so perfect manners and natural perfection. Bravery and firmness perfectly appeared in his demeanours." Still, most contemporary historians were unimpressed with his rulership and character. Some British writers accused him of being a Russian pawn for his instigation of the First Herat War.

== Coinage and titles ==
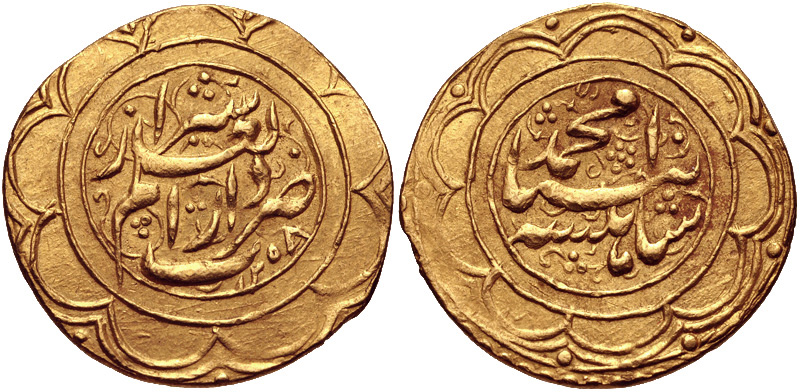
Gold coin of Mohammad Shah, struck at the Shiraz mint.

On his seal is the text "al-Sultan ibn al-Sultan Mohammad Shah Ghazi" and on a portrait that was painted between 1836 and 1837, he is identified as "al-Sultan b. al-Sultan b. al-Sultan b. al-Sultan", an effort to legitimate his right of rule by remarking on his lineage. Mohammad used the titles "Khaqan son of Khaqan", a Turko-Mongol title; and Shahanshah, an ancient Iranian title, to follow the styles of Fath-Ali Shah, who had used both Khaqan and Shahanshah.

His coins bear the inscription "Mohammad, Shahanshah-i Anbiya" (Mohammad, King of the Prophets). Mohammad Shah's coins display artistic aestheticism that is different to the coins of Fath-Ali and Naser al-Din, both of them had displayed a love for glitter.

Mohammad Shah Qajar Qajar dynasty Born: 5 January 1808 Died: 5 September 1848
Iranian royalty
Preceded by Fath-Ali Shah Qajar	Shah of Iran; 1834–1848	Succeeded by Naser al-Din Shah Qajar
