= Colombari =

Colombari is an Italian surname. Notable people with the surname include:

- Diego Colombari (born 1982), Italian cyclist
- Enrico Colombari (1905–1983), Italian footballer and manager
- F. Colombari, Italian military officer and painter
- Martina Colombari (born 1975), Italian actress, model and television presenter
