= Boret =

Surname list

Boret or Boreth is a both a given name and a surname. Notable people with the names include:

- Long Boret (1933–1975), Cambodian politician
- Vadim Boreț (born 1976), Moldovan football player and manager
- Micheal Boret (1713–?), landed in Pennsylvania in 1738.

== See also ==
- Bore (surname)
- Doret
