= Emamverdi Mirza =

Qajar Prince and head of the royal guards

- Ilkhani
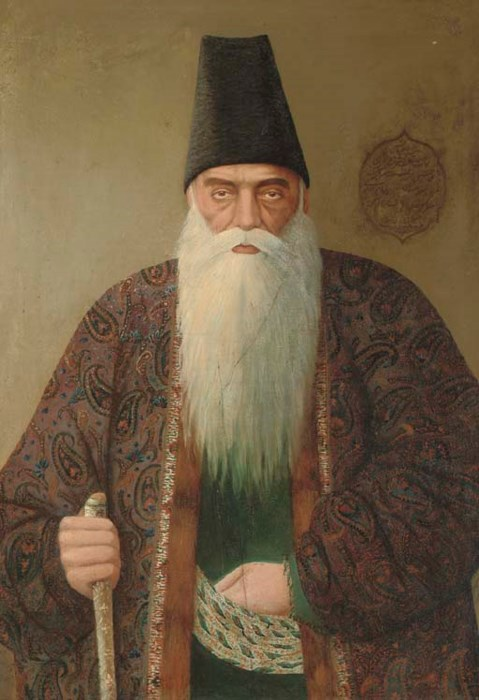
- Portrait of Emamverdi Mirza. Made in Qajar Iran, dated second half of the 19th-century
- Born: 9 March 1796
- Died: unknown
- Dynasty: Qajar
- Father: Fath-Ali Shah Qajar
- Mother: Begum Jan Khanom
- Religion: Islam

Emamverdi Mirza Ilkhani (Persian: امام وردی میرزا) was a Qajar prince who served as the sarkeshikchi-bashi (head of the royal guards) from 1807 until the death of his father Fath-Ali Shah Qajar in 1834.

Born on 9 March 1796, Emamverdi Mirza's mother was Begum Jan Khanom. After the death of Fath-Ali Shah, Emamverdi Mirza sided with his brother Ali Mirza Zel as-Soltan, who had declared himself the rightful heir to the throne of crown prince Mohammad Mirza. At Takestan, Emamverdi Mirza led a group of 15,000 soldiers in an attack on Mohammad Mirza's army. However, Emamverdi Mirza's army was destroyed, and he soon shifted his allegiance to Mohammad Mirza, now known by his regnal name of Mohammad Shah. In 1836, Emamverdi Mirza and the other Qajar princes that had opposed Mohammad Shah were apprehended and deported to the city of Ardabil.

== Sources ==
- Ardakani, Hosayn Mahbubi (1998). "Emāmverdī Mīrzā Īl-ḵānī". In Yarshater, Ehsan (ed.). Encyclopædia Iranica. Vol. VIII/4: Elam VI–English IV. London and New York: Routledge & Kegan Paul. pp. 394–395. ISBN 978-1-56859-053-0.
