= Bore (surname) =

Bore or Boré is a surname. Notable people with the surname include:

- Albert Bore (born 1946), British nuclear physicist and politician
- Etienne de Boré (1741–1820), first mayor of New Orleans
- Eugène Boré (1809–1878), Roman Catholic missionary and linguist
- Florence Bore, Kenyan politician
- Michael Bore (1947–2017), English former cricketer
- Peter Bore (born 1987), English footballer
- Thor Bjarne Bore (1938–2019), Norwegian newspaper editor and politician

== See also ==
- Bores (surname)
