= Doret =

Doret is a surname. Notable people with the surname include:

- Gustave Doret (1866–1943), Swiss composer and conductor
- Michael Doret (born 1946), American designer and illustrator
- Thomas Doret (born 1996), Belgian actor

== See also ==
- Boret (surname)
- Jules Doret Ndongo, Cameroonian politician
- Saint-Cyr-du-Doret, Nouvelle-Aquitaine, France
