= Abus gun =

Early Ottoman artillery design

The Abus gun (Turkish: Obüs meaning howitzer) is an early form of artillery created by the Ottoman Empire. They were small, but often too heavy to carry, and many were equipped with a type of tripod. They fired projectiles weighing between 3 and 9 caps (in modern measures, between 3.8 and 11.5 kilograms (8.4 and 25.4 lb)). Abus guns, despite being a form of howitzer, were primarily used as an anti-infantry weapon.

== Development ==
Its origins are not known. Early artillery such as this gun opened the way for the developments in artillery made across the ages, and spawned more recent and familiar types of artillery. By the Napoleonic era:

Each regiment of foot artillery was made up of 10 cannons; four of the older, heavy Balyemez and Sahi cannons, two of the older, lighter Abus guns and four of the new French-designed field guns... each of which came in a bewildering range of sizes. The Balyemez were massive, long-range guns...Şahi was the Ottoman word for "field," and therefore Şahi artillery meant simply field artillery... The Abus guns were a form of howitzer and came in 10- and 7-centimeter diameter bores. The French-design guns were known as Sürat Topçusu (speed artillery) because of their greater mobility."

== Mechanics ==
Abus guns were a short-barreled artillery machine that fired shots about the size of a human fist. They also had many varieties of artillery, from large siege bombard to the mobile Abus guns in question. Though light enough to carry, they needed to be equipped with a tripod of sorts. This movability was opposed to locating them in a guarded artillery emplacement, where versatility of the weapon would have been considerably restricted. The design remained unchanged until 1830 when the Prussian military advisers appointed by the sultan made a few minor improvements, standardising the weapons in order to improve efficiency.

== In popular culture ==
Abus guns are used by the Ottomans in Age of Empires III, serving as a form of light artillery.

== See also ==
- Camel gun
- Jezail
- Wall gun
- Ottoman Empire
- Napoleonic Era
- Howitzer
