= Zamburak =

Early modern period camel mounted cannons

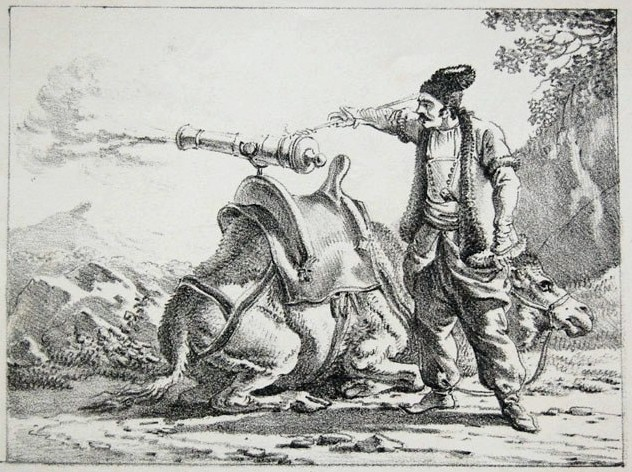
- Seventeenth-century Persian artilleryman operating a Zamburak
- Active: 17th century – early 20th century
- Country: Mughal Empire; Afsharid Iran; Durrani Empire; Dzungar Khanate; Kazakh Khanate; Maratha Empire
- Branch: Cavalry
- Equipment: Arquebus; Musket; Artillery

Zamburak (Persian: زنبورک, romanized: zanburak, lit. 'culverin', lit. 'little wasp') was a specialized form of self-propelled artillery from the early modern period featuring small swivel guns mounted on and fired from camels. Its operator was known as a zamburakchi. It was used by the gunpowder empires, especially Safavid Iran, the Timurid Empire, Afsharid Iran, and the Afghan Durrani Empire, due to the ruggedness of the Iranian plateau, which made typical transportation of heavy cannons difficult.

The zamburak became a popular mode of warfare in the eighteenth century in the Indian subcontinent. The Pashtuns used it in the Battle of Gulnabad, routing a numerically superior imperial Safavid army. It was also used successfully in the campaigns of Nader Shah when the shah and military genius Nader Shah utilized a zamburak corps in conjunction with a regular corps of conventional cannon to devastating effect in numerous battles, such as at the Battle of Damghan (1729), the Battle of Yeghevārd, and the Battle of Karnal. A large number of zamburaks were also successfully employed by Ahmad Shah Durrani during his raid in the North Indian plain in the Third Battle of Panipat against the Maratha Confederacy.

In the nineteenth century, the Sikh Khalsa Army utilised the zamburak with significant success to expel Afghan forces from the Punjab and trans-Indus regions. Hari Singh Nalwa, the Commander-in-Chief of the Sikh frontier, deployed zamburak units to consolidate control over the rugged territories of Hazara and the Peshawar Doab. These mobile units were instrumental in managing the militant tribes of the Pashtun belt and played a key role in the Battle of Jamrud (1837).

While the zamburak's mobility made it indispensable in the craggy terrain of the frontier, its prominence declined following the annexation of the Sikh Empire by the East India Company in 1849. The introduction of more sophisticated horse artillery, influenced by European military hardware and capable of traversing similarly difficult landscapes, eventually superseded the camel-mounted swivel gun. By the late 19th century, the zamburak had been largely phased out of frontline service, relegated to ceremonial roles or irregular warfare in the more remote regions of Central and South Asia.

== Use ==
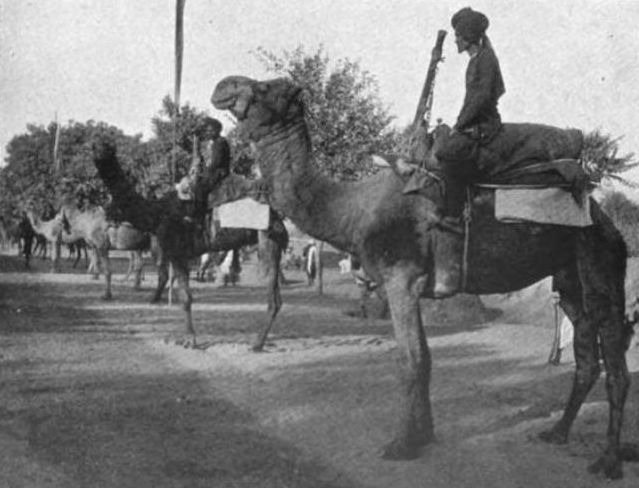
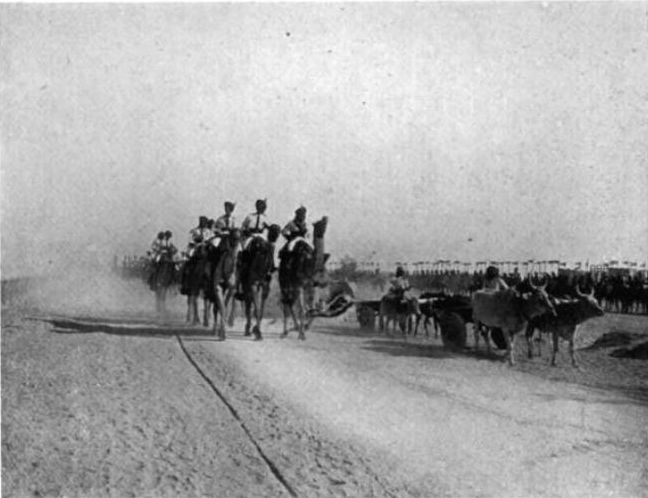
Camel guns in use by Indian cavalry at some time after 1850

Zamburaks were one of the royal guard units in the Qajar Army. A Persian zamburak regiment was accompanied by musicians with huge camel-mounted drums, to further intimidate the enemy. Zamburaks were also used during the First Anglo-Afghan War and the First and Second Anglo-Sikh Wars.

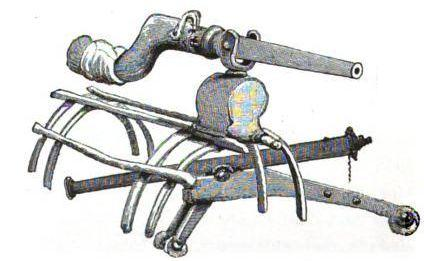
Zamburak, South Asia

By the eighteenth century, usage of Zamburak became popular in the Indian subcontinent as well. In 1761, the Durrani conqueror Ahmed Shah Durrani (also Ahmed Shah Abdali) used around 2000 camel guns in a battle against the Marathas, which proved to be a decisive factor in routing the Maratha forces near Panipat.

A zamburak consisted of a soldier on a camel with a mounted swivel gun (a small falconet) hinged on a metal fork-rest protruding from the camel's saddle. To fire it, the camel was put on its knees. The name is derived from the Persian word for wasp zambur (زنبور), possibly in reference to the sound earlier camel-mounted crossbows made. The camel's mobility combined with the swivel gun's flexibility and heavy firepower made an intimidating military unit, although the cannon's accuracy and range were rather low. The light cannon was also not particularly useful against heavy fortifications.

The Dzungar Khanate used camel-mounted miniature cannons in battle. Gunpowder weapons like guns and cannons were used by both sides during the Dzungar–Qing Wars.

After their invention in 1861, Gatling guns were mounted on camels as well.

== See also ==
- Zamburak (Iran)
- Jezail
- Abus gun
- Tofangchi
