= Bores (surname) =

Bores is a surname, and may refer to:

- Alex Bores (born 1990), American politician from New York
- Francisco Bores (1898–1972), Spanish artist
- María Bores (born 1997), Spanish footballer
- Silvano Bores (1855–1903), Argentine politician
- Tato Bores, stage name of Mauricio Borensztein (1925–1996), Argentine comedian

== See also ==
- Bore (surname)
