= F. Colombari =

Italian painter and officer 1833 to 1848

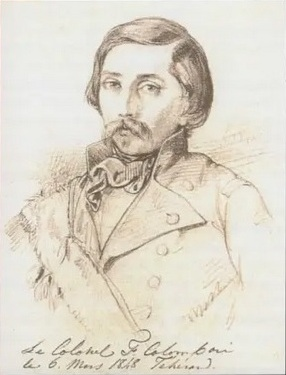
Self-portrait

Franz Colombari was an Italian officer and painter who served at the Qajar court and military between 1833 and 1848.

== Biography ==
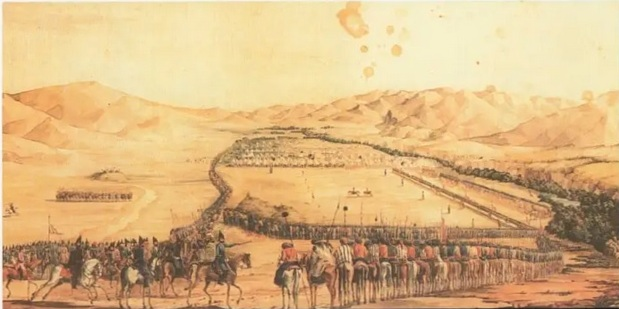
1836 review of troops by Ghahreman Mirza, son of Abbas Mirza, in the plain of Leydjan near Rawanduz. Watercolour by Colombari

Colombari was an engineer and watercolour artist, and originally hailed from Piedmont. In 1833, after gaining the rank of colonel, he moved to Qajar Iran. While in Iran, he served in the army between 1833-1848, and also belonged to a circle of artists close to the young crown prince Naser al-Din. Colombari himself, in particular, was a close confidant of the latter.

During the tenure of prime minister Haji Mirza Aqasi, Colombari assisted him in reorganizing the army and the production of weapons at the Tehran arsenal. Colombari made numerous paintings and may have personally known Hasan Ghaffari, better known as Sani ol molk. In 1844, Colombari made a watercolour painting of the future Naser ad-din Shah Qajar. In 1847, he made a watercolour portrait of Mohammad Shah Qajar, the predecessor of Naser ad-din Shah.

== Sources ==
- Fuess, Albrecht; Hartung, Jan-Peter (2014). Court Cultures in the Muslim World: Seventh to Nineteenth Centuries. Routledge. p. 412. ISBN 978-1136917806.
