= Zamburak (Iran) =

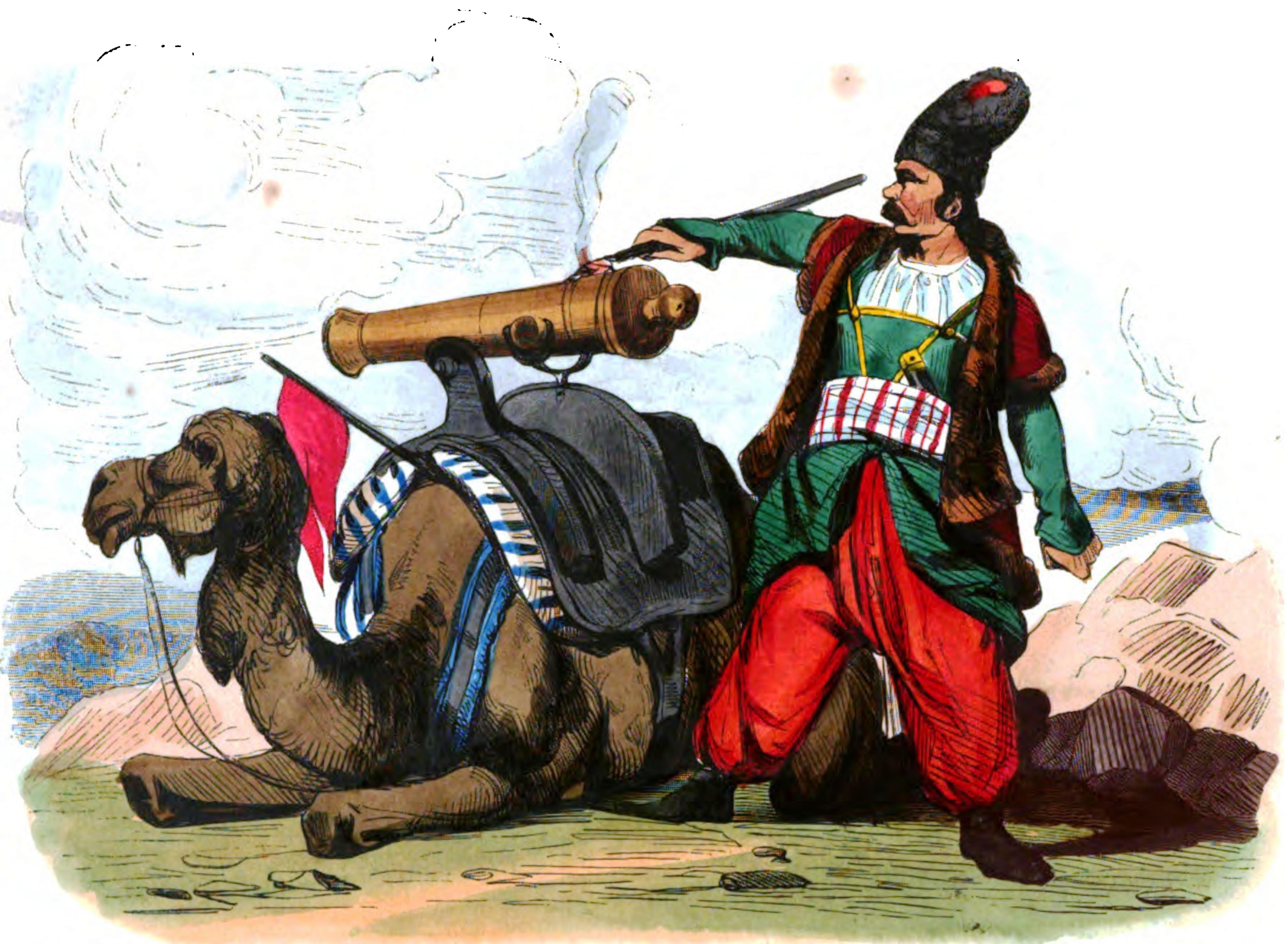
- An Iranian zamburak by the Belgian typographer Auguste Wahlen, dated 1843
- Active: early 17th century – early 20th century
- Country: Iran
- Type: Cavalry
- Role: Artillery; Military band
- Size: 1,500 (c. 1800)
- Equipment: Cannon

Insignia
- Banner (Qajar era)

A zamburak (also spelled zanburak; Persian: زنبورک, lit. 'little wasp') was a small cannon mounted on a one-humped or two-humped camel and fired by its rider, the zamburakchi. This form of artillery was used in the Iranian army from the 17th century to the early 20th century.

== History ==
A zamburak (lit. 'little wasp') was a small cannon mounted on a one-humped or two-humped and fired by its rider, the zamburakchi. Although they could also be used from a moving camel, zamburaks were often fired from a sitting one. Its origin is uncertain. Camels were widely used for transport and as military mounts across Asia, from Anatolia to China, making these areas possible origins of the zamburak. The zamburak represented foreign military technology adapted to local conditions, as it was mounted directly on camels rather than on a carriage, allowing for greater mobility and versatility. Before the introduction of firearms to Iran, the word zamburak had already been used by poets such as Nezami Ganjavi (died 1209) and Amir Khusrow (died 1325) in an expressive way, to describe arrows piercing the enemy's chest like a beehive.

Although the weapon may have been in use in Safavid Iran as early as the 16th century, the earliest foreign eyewitness reports of its use came from the late Safavid period. It first appears in Iranian writings during the reign of Shah Abbas I (r. 1587–1629). The zamburak, like other cannons, was used to honor foreign dignitaries. A unit called the zamburak-khana was eventually formed and was commanded by a zamburakchi-bashi. During the late Safavid period, there were 3,000 zamburaks. The Afsharid ruler Nader Shah (r. 1736–1747) used zamburaks during his invasion of India between 1738–1739. In a military parade in 1739/40, 1,700 zamburaks were present.

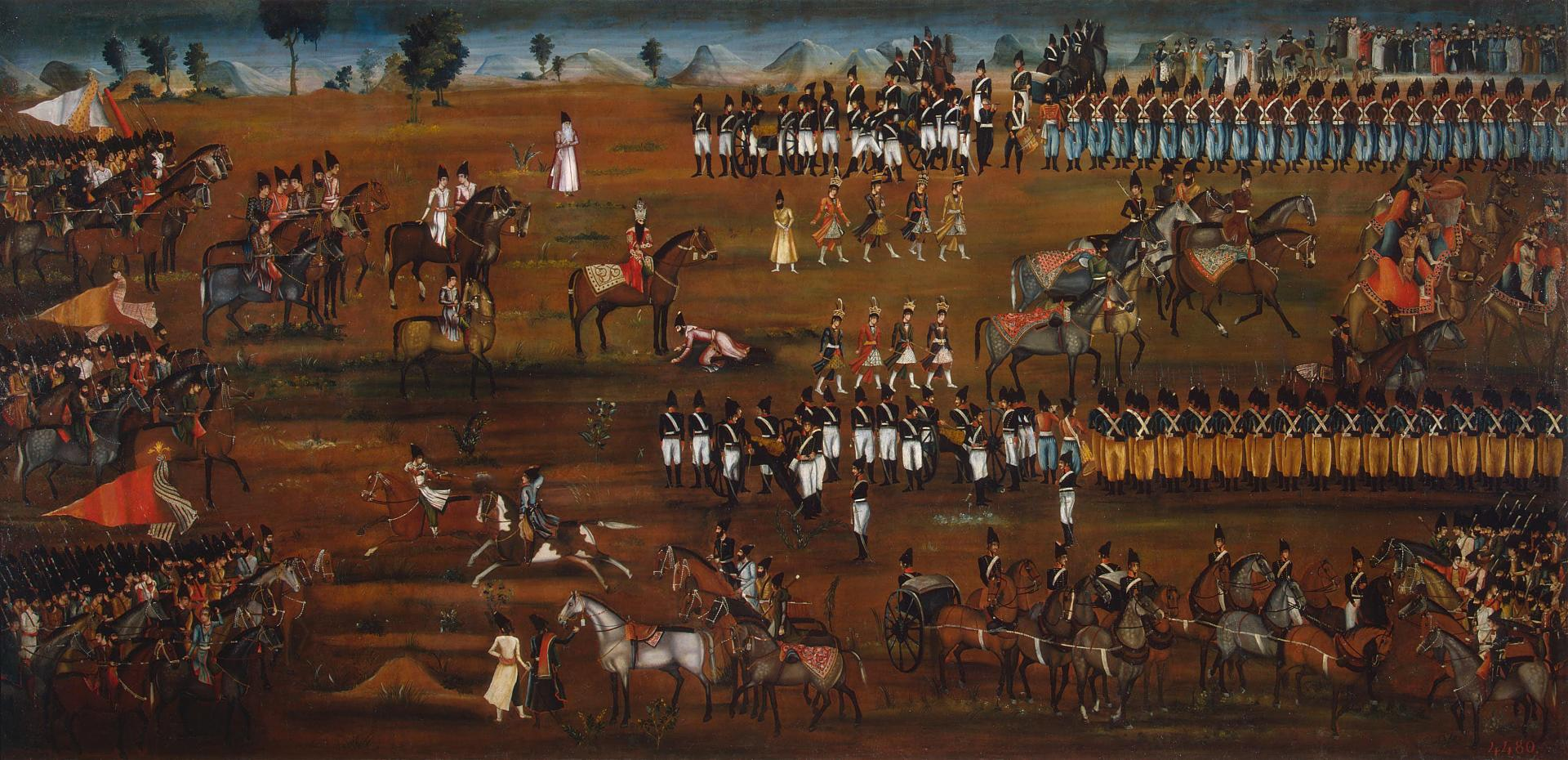
Oil painting illustrating a military review with Fath-Ali Shah and Abbas Mirza, dated 1815/16. The zamburak and zamburakchi are depicted on the upper right.

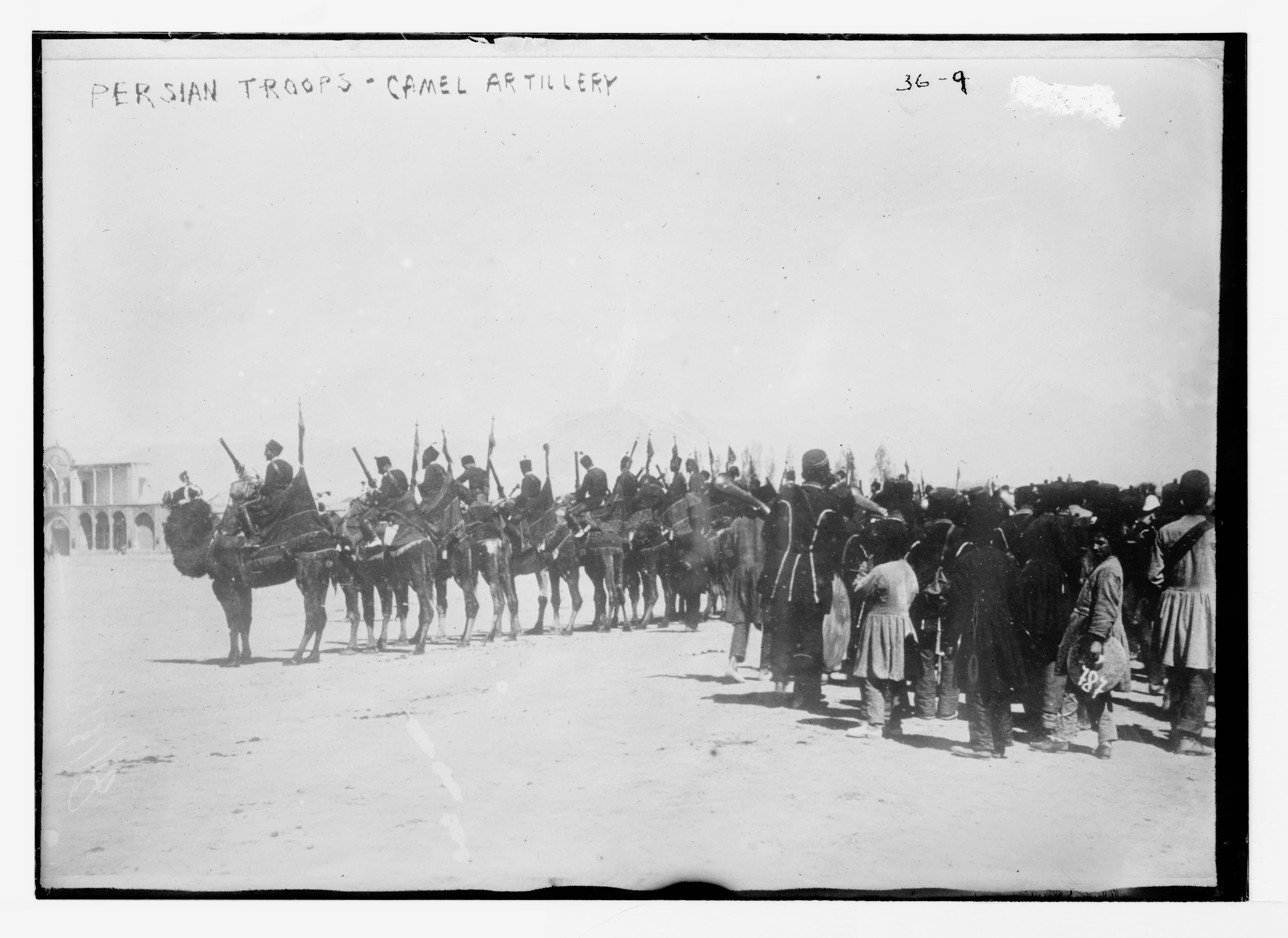
Photograph of zamburaks, dated 1910

During the early Qajar period, Iran remained behind other powers in weapon technology and usage. Rifles continued to be supplied by the soldiers themselves. Other than the zamburak, the artillery of the nation consisted mainly of weapons captured from the Portuguese in 1622 and from the Russians during the 18th-century wars. The zamburakchi wore the same uniform as other pre-modern Iranian soldiers; Astrakhan hat, sleeveless fur-lined jacket, tunic, cloth belt, dagger, pantaloons and leather boots. In c. 1800, during the reign of Fath-Ali Shah Qajar (r. 1797–1834), there were around 1,500 zamburaks. By then, the zamburak had lost its significance and had become outdated.

Inspired by the Europeans, Fath-Ali Shah's son and heir Abbas Mirza abolished the use of the zamburak on the battlefield, instead using heavier artillery pulled by horses or mules, similar to Europe. The musical and artillery branches of the zamburak were preserved solely for ceremonial purposes. Compared to those in the West, the musical branch of the zamburakchis played a different role. In Western armies, soldiers often marched in rhythm to drumbeats during battles, sometimes accompanied by martial tunes that helped them maintain pace and coordination. Meanwhile, the purpose of the musical branch of the zamburakchis was to irritate the enemy soldiers. After Naser al-Din Shah's visit to Vienna in 1878, Iran started mainly buying weapons from Austria-Hungary, including artillery for the zamburaks.

A neighborhood in Tehran near the Sar-e Qabr-e Agha mausoleum was originally named Goud Zanburkhaneh ("the Zanburkhaneh pit"). According to local folklore, the name arose in the Qajar era because camels and weapons used for the zamburaks were stored there. The camel carrying the zamburak became proverbial during this period. The expression mesl-e shotor-e zanburkhaneh ast ("he/she is like the zanburkhaneh camel") was used to describe someone acclimatized to loud noises, suggesting that the camel had endured so many blasts on its back that it no longer reacted.

== See also ==
- Zamburak

== Sources ==
- Behrooz, Maziar (2023). Iran at War: Interactions with the Modern World and the Struggle with Imperial Russia. I.B. Tauris. ISBN 978-0755637379.
- Eskandari-Qajar, Manoutchehr (2005). "Mohammad Shah Qajar's Nezam-e Jadid and Colonel Colombari's Zambourakchis". International Qajar Studies Association. 5: 53–79. ISBN 9056130706.
- Floor, Willem (2021). "The Safavid Army: Continuity and Change". In Matthee, Rudi (ed.). The Safavid World. Taylor & Francis. pp. 224–244. ISBN 978-1138944060.
- Karimi, Asghar (2020). "بهار شیروانی". The Great Islamic Encyclopaedia (in Persian).
- Matthee, Rudi (1999). "Firearms i. History". In Yarshater, Ehsan (ed.). Encyclopædia Iranica (Online ed.). Encyclopædia Iranica Foundation. ISBN 978-0933273719.
