= Eugène Boré =

French missionary and linguist

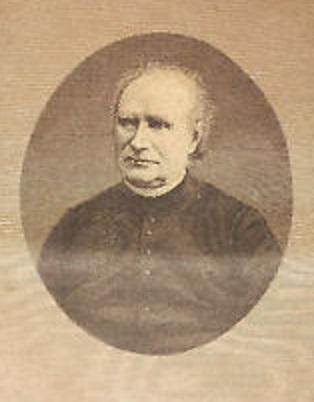
Eugène Boré

Eugène Boré, CM (1809– 1878) was a French Vincentian missionary, linguist and translator.

== Biography ==
Eugène Boré was born on 15 August 1809 in Angers, France. In 1829, he joined the inner circle of Fr Félicité de Lamennais.

Member of the Asiatic Society in 1833, he won fame in the Journal Asiatique. He was professor of Armenian (1833–34) at the Collège de France. Sent to Venice, he published the results of his literary labours there in the convent of the Mekhitarists. Spending six months of 1837 in study at Constantinople, he went with the Vincentian (Lazarist) priest M. Scaffi to Erzerum in what was then Armenia.

In 1839, Boré created the first French school in Tabriz, Qajar Iran, as an opening wedge for Christianity. The Shah of Persia honoured him for the excellence of his school. In addition to many learned studies sent to France, his interesting letters were published as "The Correspondence of a Traveller in the Orient". In 1841, Boré secured Lazarist missioners for Persia. For services to France in that land he was given the cross of the Legion of Honour. Pope Gregory XVI made him a Knight of the Golden Militia in 1842 and Knight of St. Gregory the Great in 1843.

Knowing forty Oriental languages, most of them thoroughly, Boré published in some of these works. He worked towards the reunification of Eastern Christians with the Catholic Church and was helped in his mission by his wide acquaintance with the most learned and influential men of France and Italy. Boré published an illuminating report of the condition of the Holy Land when he was sent by France to investigate in 1847.

Entering the Congregation of the Mission (the Lazarists) in January 1849 at Constantinople, Boré was ordained there on April 7, 1850, and made his vows in Paris in January 1851. Sent to Constantinople as head of the College of Bebek, he remained 15 years doing work for Muslims and Christians, especially on the battlefield during the Crimean War.

In Paris, he was made secretary general of the Congregation of the Mission (1866) and then elected superior general on September 11, 1874. His mandate was cut short at the end of four years by a sudden illness. He died at Maison-Mere in Paris on 3 May 1878.
