= Sahabi (name) =

Sahabi is a surname. Notable people with the surname include:

- Ezzatollah Sahabi (1930–2011), Iranian politician and journalist
- Fereydun Sahabi (born 1937), Iranian academic, writer, translator, and social activist
- Haleh Sahabi (1958–2011), Iranian humanitarian and democracy activist
- Yadollah Sahabi (1905–2002), Iranian scholar, writer, reformist, and politician
