= Presidency of Abolhassan Banisadr =

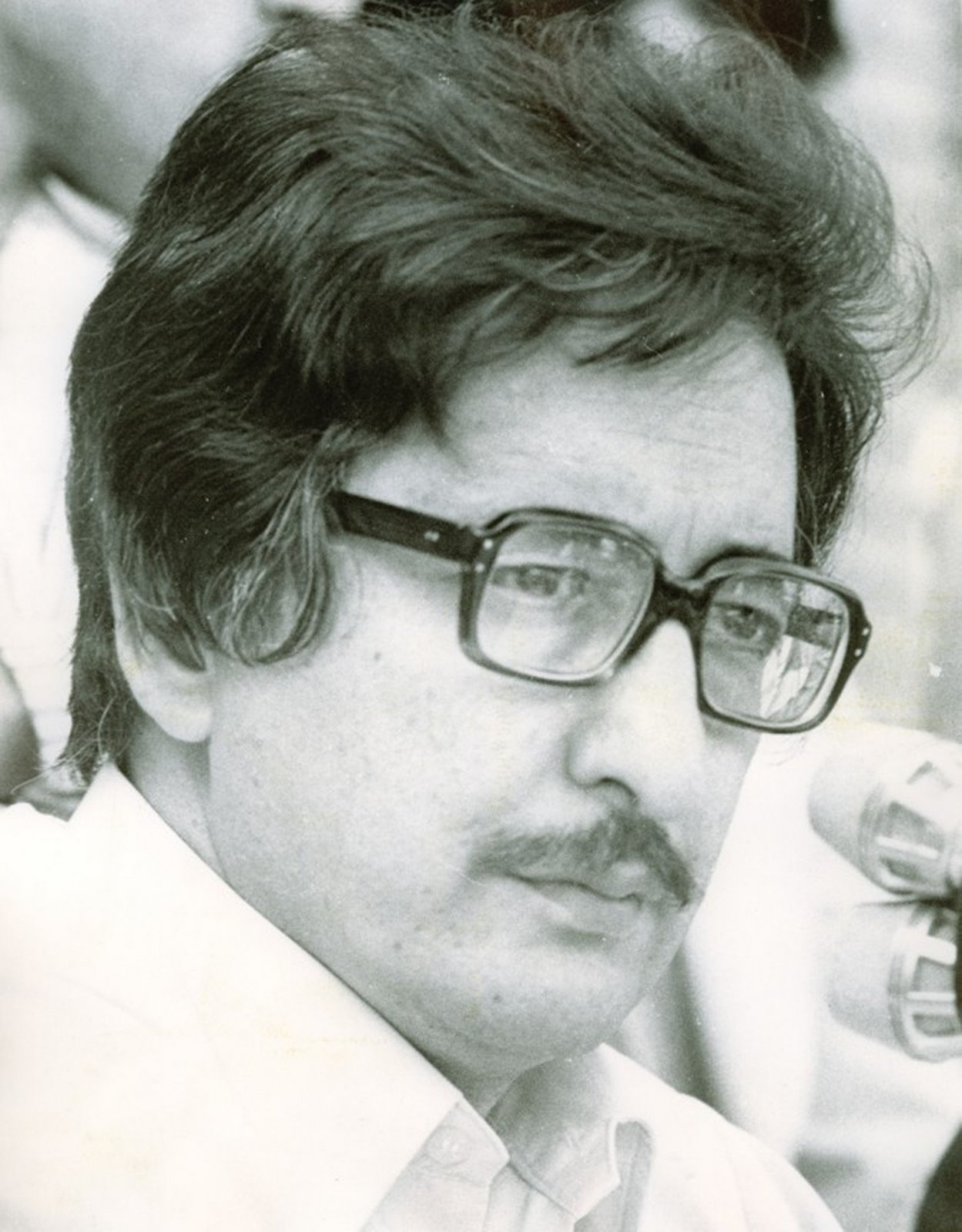
- Banisadr in 1979
- Presidency of Abolhassan Banisadr; 4 February 1980 – 22 June 1981
- Premier: Mohammad-Ali Rajai (from August 12)
- Cabinet: See list
- Party: Office for the Cooperation of the People with the President
- Election: 1980
- Emblem/Coat of Arms of Iran since May 1980

Abolhassan Banisadr's tenure as the first President of Iran began with his inauguration on 4 February 1980 following a major victory in the 1980 elections until he was impeached and removed from office on 22 June 1981 which resulted in him being forced into Exile in France and a month after he was removed from office and forced into exile, Banisadr would form the PMOI-affiliated National Council of Resistance of Iran (NCRI). During his presidency, Mohammad-Ali Rajai was also the Prime minister of Iran, serving from 12 August 1980 until Banisadr's Presidency Ended.

== Banisadr's presidency ==
He was elected to a four-year term as president on 25 January 1980, receiving 78.9 percent of the vote in a competitive election against Ahmad Madani, Hassan Habibi, Sadegh Tabatabaee, Dariush Forouhar, Sadegh Ghotbzadeh, Kazem Sami, Mohammad Makri, Hassan Ghafourifard, and Hassan Ayat, and inaugurated on 4 February. Khomeini remained the Supreme Leader of Iran, with the constitutional authority to dismiss the President. The inaugural ceremonies were held at the hospital where Khomeini was recovering from a heart ailment.

Banisadr was not an Islamic cleric; Khomeini had insisted that clerics should not run for positions in the government. In August and September 1980, Banisadr survived two helicopter crashes near the Iranian border with Iraq.

Banisadr soon fell out with Khomeini, who reclaimed the power of Commander-in-Chief on 10 June 1981.

== Rajai's prime ministership ==
After the Iranian Revolution in 1979, he became Minister of Education in the Interim Government of Mehdi Bazargan. When Abolhassan Banisadr was elected as president, The parliament elected him as the new prime minister. He was prime minister of Islamic Republic of Iran from 1980 to 1981. He was also Minister of Foreign Affairs for five months, 11 March 1981 to 15 August 1981, while he was prime minister.

== Members of the cabinet ==
During the nomination process, there were serious tensions between Rajai and Banisadr due to the latter's objections over the candidates.

List of members of Rajai's cabinet was as follows:

Ministry	Minister
President	Abolhassan Banisadr
Prime Minister	Mohammad-Ali Rajai
Agricultural	Mohammad Salamati
Commerce	Hossein Kazempur
Post	Mahmoud Ghandi
Culture and Islamic Guidance	Abbas Duzduzani
Defense and Armed Forces Logistics	Javad Fakoori
Economy	Hossein Namazi
Education	Mohammad-Javad Bahonar
Energy	Hassan Abbaspur
Foreign Affairs	Karim Khodapanahi; Mohammad-Ali Rajai (acting); Mir-Hossein Mousavi
Health	Hadi Manafi
Housing and Urban Development	Mohammad-Shahab Gonabadi
Industries	Mohammad-Reza Ne'matzadeh
Interior	Mohammad-Reza Mahdavi Kani
Justice	Ebrahim Ahadi
Labour and Social Affairs	Mir-Mohammad Sadeghi
Petroleum	Mohammad Javad Tondguyan
Roads	Mousa Kalantary
Science and Culture	Hassan Arefi

== See also ==
- Cabinet of Iran

Cabinet of Iran
Preceded by Interim Cabinet of Revolutionary Council	Cabinet of Rajai; 1980–1981	Succeeded by Government of Bahonar
