= Interim Government of Iran (1981) =

- Provisional cabinet of Islamic Republic of Iran
- Prime Minister
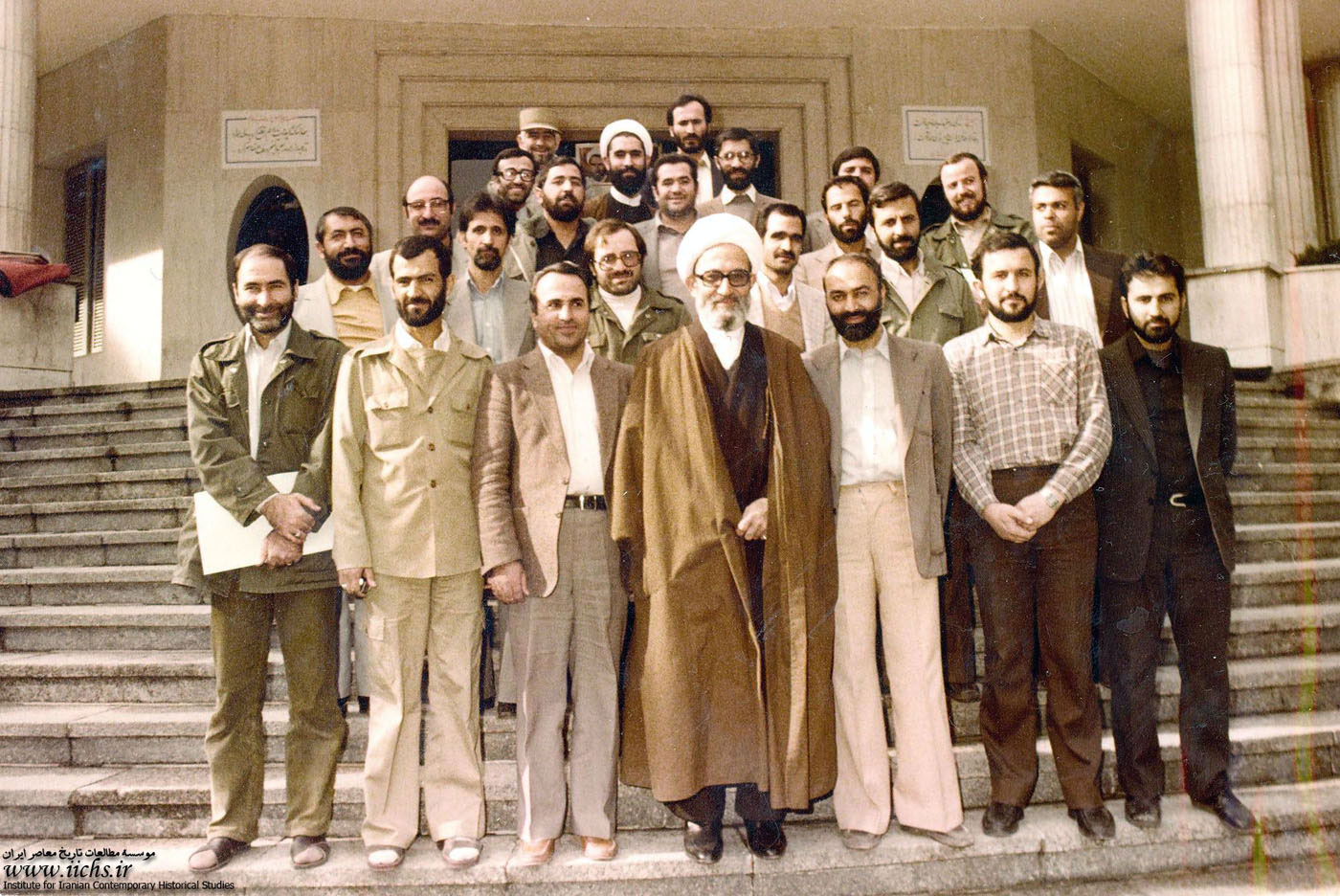
- Interim cabinet of Mahdavi Kani
- Date formed: 2 September 1981
- Date dissolved: 29 October 1981

People and organisations
- Supreme Leader: Rouhollah Khomeini
- Prime Minister: Mohammad-Reza Mahdavi Kani
- Prime Minister's history: Minister of Interior (1980–81) Minister of Justice (1980)
- President: Presidential Council; Ali Khamenei
- No. of ministers: 18
- Ministers removed: 1
- Total no. of members: 19

History
- Predecessor: Bahonar
- Successor: Mousavi I

The interim government of the Islamic Republic of Iran (21 September 1981 – 29 October 1981) was established after the assassination of Mohammad-Ali Rajai (President) and Mohammad Javad Bahonar (Prime Minister) on 30 August. In accordance with the constitution, a Provisional Presidential Council formed the same day and proposed Mohammad-Reza Mahdavi Kani as prime minister to the Majlis. Majlis voted in favour of him on 2 September. His cabinet also received approval of the Majlis on 3 September. The main responsibility of this government was holding presidential elections. On 13 October, Ali Khamenei officially became president. His prime minister, Mir-Hossein Mousavi received Majlis's approval on 29 October (after Majlis' negative vote to Khamenei's first candidate, Ali Akbar Velayati) and then the new government replaced Mahdavi-Kani's interim government.

== Cabinet members ==
Portfolio	Minister	Took office	Left office	Party
Prime Minister	Mohammad-Reza Mahdavi Kani	2 September 1981	29 October 1981	CCA
Spokesperson	Behzad Nabavi	2 September 1981	29 October 1981	Mojahedin of the Islamic Revolution Organization
Ministers
Agricultural Minister	Mohammad Salamati	3 September 1981	2 November 1981	Mojahedin of the Islamic Revolution Organization
Commerce Minister	Habibollah Asgaroladi	3 September 1981	2 November 1981	IRP
Post Minister	Morteza Nabavi	3 September 1981	2 November 1981	IRP
Islamic Guidance Minister	Abdolmajid Moadikhah	3 September 1981	2 November 1981	IRP
Defense Minister	Mousa Namjoo	3 September 1981	29 September 1981	Military
Defense Minister	Mohammad Salimi	October 1981	2 November 1981	Military
Finance Minister	Hossein Namazi	3 September 1981	2 November 1981	IRP
Education Minister	Ali Akbar Parvaresh	3 September 1981	2 November 1981	IRP
Energy Minister	Hassan Ghafourifard	3 September 1981	2 November 1981	IRP
Foreign Minister	Mir-Hossein Mousavi	3 September 1981	2 November 1981	IRP
Health Minister	Hadi Manafi	3 September 1981	2 November 1981	IRP
Housing Minister	Mohammad Shahab Gonabadi	3 September 1981	2 November 1981	Mojahedin of the Islamic Revolution Organization
Heavy Industries Minister	Mostafa Hashemitaba	3 September 1981	2 November 1981	Non partisan
Interior Minister	Kamal Nikravesh	3 September 1981	2 November 1981	IRP
Justice Minister	Mohammad Asghari	3 September 1981	2 November 1981	IRP
Labour Minister	Mohammad Mir-Mohammad Sadeghi	3 September 1981	2 November 1981	IRP
Petroleum Minister	Mohammad Gharazi	3 September 1981	2 November 1981	Non partisan
Roads Minister	Hadi Nejad-Hosseinian	3 September 1981	2 November 1981	IRP
Culture Minister	Mohammad-Ali Najafi	3 September 1981	2 November 1981	Non partisan
Ministers without portfolio
Plan and Budget Organization	Mohammad-Taghi Banki	3 September 1981	2 November 1981	IRP
Executive Affairs	Behzad Nabavi	3 September 1981	2 November 1981	Mojahedin of the Islamic Revolution Organization
State Welfare Organization	Mahmoud Rouhani	3 September 1981	2 November 1981	IRP
National Steel Company	Hossein Mousaviani	3 September 1981	2 November 1981	IRP

== See also ==
- 1979 Iranian Interim Government
- Iran transition government in waiting

Cabinet of Iran
Preceded by Government of Bahonar	Cabinet of Mahdavi Kani; 1981	Succeeded by First Government of Mousavi
