= Abolished administration of Mohammad-Javad Bahonar (1981) =

The Government of Mohammad-Javad Bahonar was the second government of Iran after the Iranian Revolution. During that time, Mohammad-Ali Rajai was president and Mohammad-Javad Bahonar was prime minister.

== Rajai's Presidency ==
On August 15, 1981, Rajai was elected as second president of Iran. He introduced Mohammad-Javad Bahonar as prime minister to parliament and parliament voted him. Rajai was the President of Iran for 15 days. On August 30, 1981, President Rajai held a meeting of Iran's Supreme Defense Council, along with Prime Minister Mohammad Javad Bahonar. Witnesses later stated that a trusted aide brought a briefcase into the conference room, setting it between the two leaders, then left. Another person opened the case, triggering a bomb that set the room ablaze and killed Rajai, Bahonar, and three others.

== Bahonar's Prime Ministership ==
When Rajai became President on August 4, 1981, he chose Bahonar as his prime minister.

After Mohammad Beheshti was assassinated on June 28, 1981, Bahonar became the secretary-general of the Islamic Republic party, but he didn't last long in that position, nor in the position of Prime Minister, as he was assassinated after less than two months in these offices, along with Rajai and other party leaders, when a bomb exploded at his office in Tehran.

== Members of the cabinet ==
List of members of Bahonar's cabinet was as follows:

Cabinet members
Portfolio	Minister	Took office	Left office	Party
Prime Minister	Mohammad-Javad Bahonar	5 August 1981	30 August 1981	IRP
Ministers
Agricultural Minister	Mohammad Salamati	17 August 1981	3 September 1981	Mojahedin of the Islamic Revolution Organization
Commerce Minister	Habibollah Asgaroladi	17 August 1981	3 September 1981	IRP
Post Minister	Morteza Nabavi	17 August 1981	3 September 1981	IRP
Islamic Guidance Minister	Abdolmajid Moadikhah	17 August 1981	3 September 1981	IRP
Defense Minister	Mousa Namjoo	17 August 1981	3 September 1981	Military
Finance Minister	Hossein Namazi	17 August 1981	3 September 1981	IRP
Education Minister	Ali Akbar Parvaresh	17 August 1981	3 September 1981	IRP
Energy Minister	Hassan Ghafourifard	17 August 1981	3 September 1981	IRP
Foreign Minister	Mir-Hossein Mousavi	17 August 1981	3 September 1981	IRP
Health Minister	Hadi Manafi	17 August 1981	3 September 1981	IRP
Housing Minister	Mohammad-Shahab Gonabadi	17 August 1981	3 September 1981	Mojahedin of the Islamic Revolution Organization
Heavy Industries Minister	Mostafa Hashemitaba	17 August 1981	3 September 1981	Nonpartisan
Interior Minister	Kamal Nikravesh	17 August 1981	3 September 1981	IRP
Justice Minister	Mohammad Asghari	17 August 1981	3 September 1981	IRP
Labour Minister	Mohammad Mir-Mohammad Sadeghi	17 August 1981	3 September 1981	IRP
Petroleum Minister	Mohammad Gharazi	17 August 1981	3 September 1981	Nonpartisan
Roads Minister	Ahmad Amri (head of ministry)	5 August 1981	3 September 1981	Nonpartisan
Culture Minister	Mohammad-Ali Najafi	17 August 1981	3 September 1981	Nonpartisan
Ministers without portfolio
Plan and Budget Organization	Mohammad-Taghi Banki	17 August 1981	3 September 1981	IRP
Executive Affairs	Behzad Nabavi	17 August 1981	3 September 1981	Mojahedin of the Islamic Revolution Organization
State Welfare Organization	Mahmoud Rouhani	17 August 1981	3 September 1981	IRP
National Steel Company	Hossein Mousaviani	17 August 1981	3 September 1981	IRP

== See also ==
- Cabinet of Iran

Cabinet of Iran
Preceded by Government of Rajai	Cabinet of Bahonar; 1981	Succeeded by Interim Government of Mahdavi Kani
