= Amir Khosrow Dalirsani =

Amir Khosrow Dalirsani (Persian: امیرخسرو دلیرثانی, also spelled Amir Khosro Dalirsani), an Iranian national-religious activist and a member of the Committee Against Arbitrary Arrests, has been arrested after Iranian presidential election in 2009.

== Arrest ==
Dalirsani was arrested on January 3, 2010, following the popular protests on December 27, 2009 (Ashura). Judge Mogheyseh of the 28th branch of the Revolutionary Court charged him with "gathering and collusion with the intent to commit crimes against national security" to 4 years in prison. His trial was held on May 16, 2010. The decision has been communicated to Dalirsani who is currently detained at ward 350 of Evin Prison.

Amir Khosro Dalirsani who is serving his 4-year prison sentence, is deprived of prison leaves and prison visits since March 2010, with his 5 years old child.

== Hunger Strike ==
On June 2, 2011, Amir Khosrow Dalirsani went on a hunger strike along with Hoda Saber after Haleh Sahabi was assaulted at her father's funeral which resulted in her death. Saber died of a heart attack during the hunger strike.

From June 18, 2010, Amir Khosrow Dalirsani along with 11 political prisoners went on the second hunger strike after Saber's dead. Kalame reports Abdollah Momenei and Amir Khosrow Dalirsani have been treated very harshly by Evin personnel. Interrogators have chastised Amir Khosrow Dalirsani telling him that his hunger strike along with Hoda Saber's hunger strike has caused all of these problems.
