= Mirza Mahmoud Khan Naser ol-Molk =

Iranian Foreign Minister (c.1828/29–)

Mirza Mahmoud Khan Farmanfarma
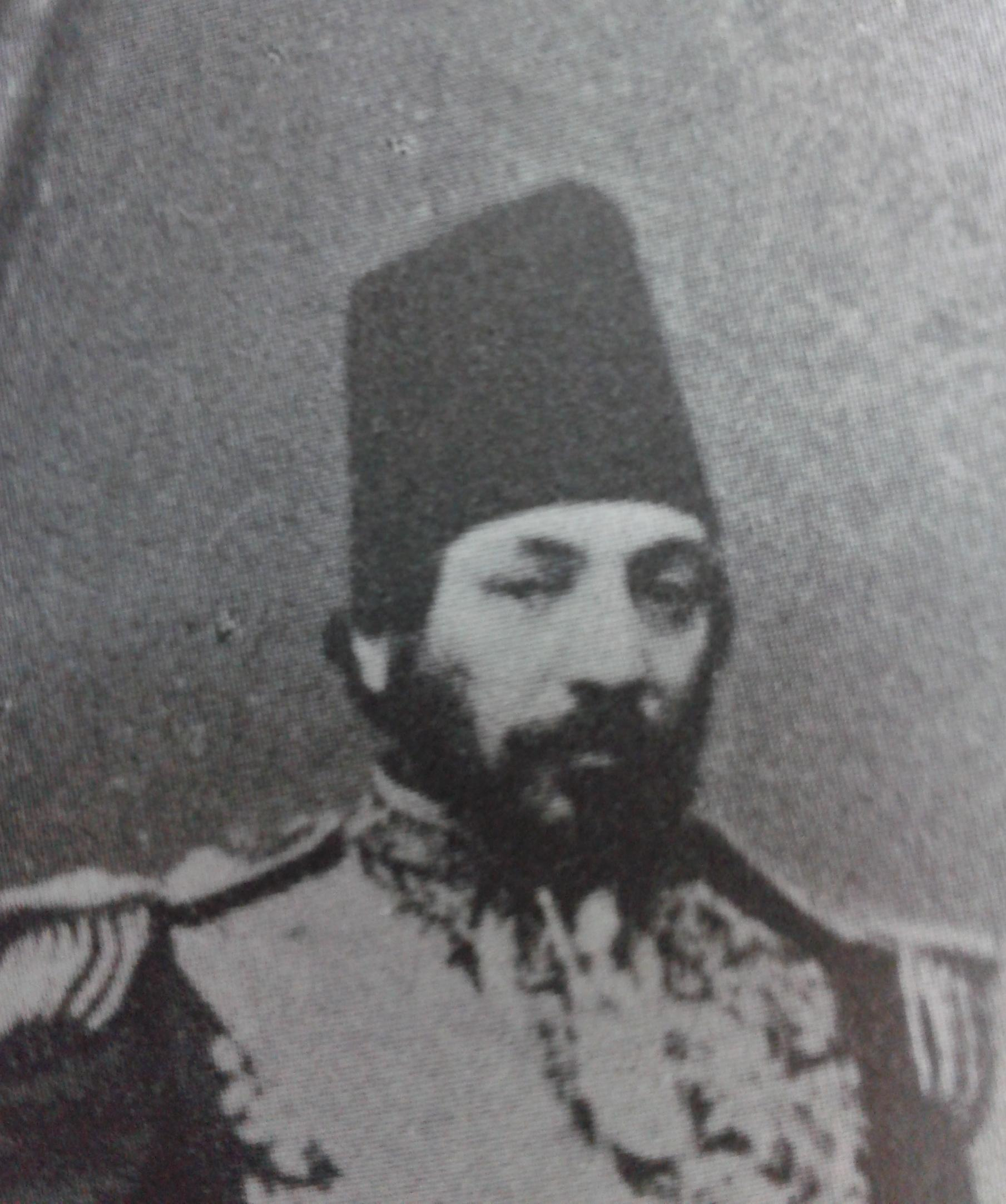

Minister of Foreign Affairs
- In office 1884–1886
- Monarch: Naser al-Din Shah Qajar
- Preceded by: Mirza Saeed Khan Ansari
- Succeeded by: Mirza Yahya Khan Moshir od-Dowleh

Chargé d'affaires
- In office 1854–1855

Ambassador of Iran to Russia
- In office 1854–1855
- Monarch: Naser al-Din Shah Qajar
- Succeeded by: Abbasqoli Khan Sayf ol-Molk

Personal details
- Born: c. 1828–1829
- Died: 12 December 1887 Tehran, Iran

Mirza Mahmoud Khan Naser ol-Molk (Persian: میرزا محمود خان نصیرالملک) also known as Mahmoud Qaragozlu (Persian: محمود قراگوزلو; c. 1828–29 – 12 December 1887), was a Qajar era official who occupied high positions under Naser al-Din Shah Qajar (r. 1848–1896).

== Biography ==
Mahmoud Khan was an member of the Qaragozlu tribe, which resided near Hamadan and produced many statesmen, especially in the Qajar era.

=== Career ===
Mahmoud Khan was already a high army commander when he was appointed first deputy ambassador to Russia in 1854, shortly after his arrival in Saint Petersburg he became Chargé d'affaires. In 1855, when Abbasqoli Khan Sayf op-Molk was appointed ambassador, Mahmoud Khan returned to Iran. In 1858 or 1859 he was put in charge of the royal cavalry, armory and ordnance. and received the title Naser ol-Molk. On next year he became minister of commerce and state industries, and a member of the government consultative assembly; about in same time he was appointed special adviser to shah. In 1862 or 1864 he served as Persian minister to the Court of St James's in England. In 1871, Shah reorganised the consultative assembly, Mahmoud Khan was again one of its members, on following year he became head of the military council. At that time new Grand Vizier, Mirza Hosein Khan Moshir od-Dowleh, gived all military affairs under his charge.

During Naser al-Din Shah's first journey to Europe, Mahmoud Khan was named Commander-in-chief of the army and deputy Minister of War. Two years later he was appointed governor of Gilan. He accompanied the shah on his second European journey in 1878.

Illustration of Naser ol-Molk by Abu Torab Ghaffari, dated 1883

In 1882, Mahmaoud Khan became the governor of Kermanshah and Kurdistan, wresting control of the Iraqi border areas from Naser al-Din Shah's son Mass'oud Mirza Zell-e Soltan, governor of Fars and in control of most of Southern and Western Iran. Between 1884 and 1886 he served as foreign minister, then became governor of Khorasan, receiving the title Farmanfarma, traditionally reserved for Qajar princes serving as governors of Fars; the granting of this title to Mahmoud Khan thus caused some discontent. About 18 months later, Naser al-Din shah's brother Mohammad Taqi Mirza Rokn ed-Dowleh replaced him.

== Sources ==
- E'temad al-Saltaneh, Mohammad Hasan Khan (1966). Ruz-nama-ye khaterat-e E'temad al-Saltaneh [The Diary of E'temad al-Saltaneh] (in Persian). Tehran: Amir Kabir Publishers.
- Bamdad, Mahdi (1968). شرح حال رجال ايران در قرن ١٢ و١٣ و ١٤ هجرى [Biography of the Notables of Iran in the 12th, 13th, and 14th Hijri Centuries] (in Persian). Vol. 4. Tehran: Zavvar.
- E'temad al-Saltaneh, Mohammad Hasan Khan (1988b). Rezvani, Mohammad Esma'il (ed.). Tarikh-e Montazam-e Naseri [The Naseri History] (in Persian). Vol. 3. Tehran: Donya-ye Ketab.
- Nava'i, Abd-al-Hosayn (1999). "Farmānfarmā, Maḥmūd Khan Nāṣer-al-Molk". In Yarshater, Ehsan (ed.). Encyclopædia Iranica. Encyclopædia Iranica Foundation.
- E'temad al-Saltaneh, Mohammad Hasan Khan (1988c). Rezvani, Mohammad Esma'il (ed.). Tarikh-e Montazam-e Naseri [The Naseri History] (in Persian). Vol. 2. Tehran: Donya-ye Ketab.
- Mardukh Kordestani, Mohammad (1972). Tarikh-e Kord o Kordestan o Tavabe' ya Tarikh-e Mardukh [History of Kurds and Kurdistan and Dependencies or History of Mardukh] (in Persian). Vol. 2. Sanandaj: Ghani/Zivar.
- Divanbeygi, Ahmad (1987). Nava'i, Abd-al-Hosayn (ed.). Hadiqat al-sho'ara [Garden of Poets] (in Persian). Vol. 2. Tehran: Zarrin.
