= 1864 in Iran =

- Decades
- See also: Other events of 1864; Years in Iran

The following lists events that happened during 1864 in Qajar era.

== Incumbents ==
- Monarch: Naser al-Din Shah Qajar

== Births ==
- January 17 – Mehdi Qoli Hedayat, Prime Minister of Iran.
- February 28 – Hovhannes Masehyan, Iranian politician, writer and translator.
- ? – Ali Khan Zahir od-Dowleh, Iranian politician.
- ? – Hussein Kuli Khan Nawab, Iranian politician.
- ? – Keikhosrow Shahrokh, Iranian politician.

== Deaths ==
- November 18 – Morteza Ansari, Iranian Shia jurist.
