= Masoud Keshmiri =

Iranian militant and undercover politician

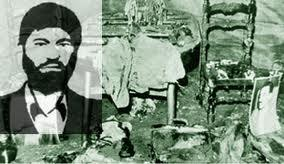
- Killing of Mohammad-Ali Rajai and Mohammad-Javad Bahonar in 1981 by Masoud Keshmiri
- Born: 1950; Kermanshah, Pahlavi Iran
- Died: June 11, 2023 (aged 72–73); Paris, France (alleged by some Iranian media)
- Political party: Islamic Republican Party (1979–1981)
- Wanted by: Iran
- Wanted since: 1981

Masoud Keshmiri (Persian: مسعود کشمیری) was an Iranian militant and "anti-government secret agent", according to Tehran Radio. He infiltrated the Islamic Republican Party (IRP) and came up through the ranks, reaching the position of secretary of the Supreme National Security Council, before planting an incendiary bomb in his briefcase that blew up the Prime Minister's office in 1981. Victims of the explosion were President Mohammad-Ali Rajai and Prime Minister Mohammad-Javad Bahonar among others.

On September 14, Iranian authorities acknowledged the extent of infiltration within the regime by revealing that Massoud Keshmiri—formerly a trusted aide to the late President Muhammad Ali Rajai and serving as secretary of the Supreme Security Council—had orchestrated the August 30 bombing of the Prime Minister's office. At first, it was thought that Keshmiri himself died in the explosion, however it was later revealed that he slipped through the dragnet.

Iranian state media claimed that Keshmiri was killed in a June 11, 2023, attack on an Mujahedeen-e-Khalq (MEK) site in a Paris suburb.

== See also ==
- List of fugitives from justice who disappeared
