= Treaty of Akhal =

1881 agreement between Iran and Russia

Akhal-Khorasan Boundary Convention
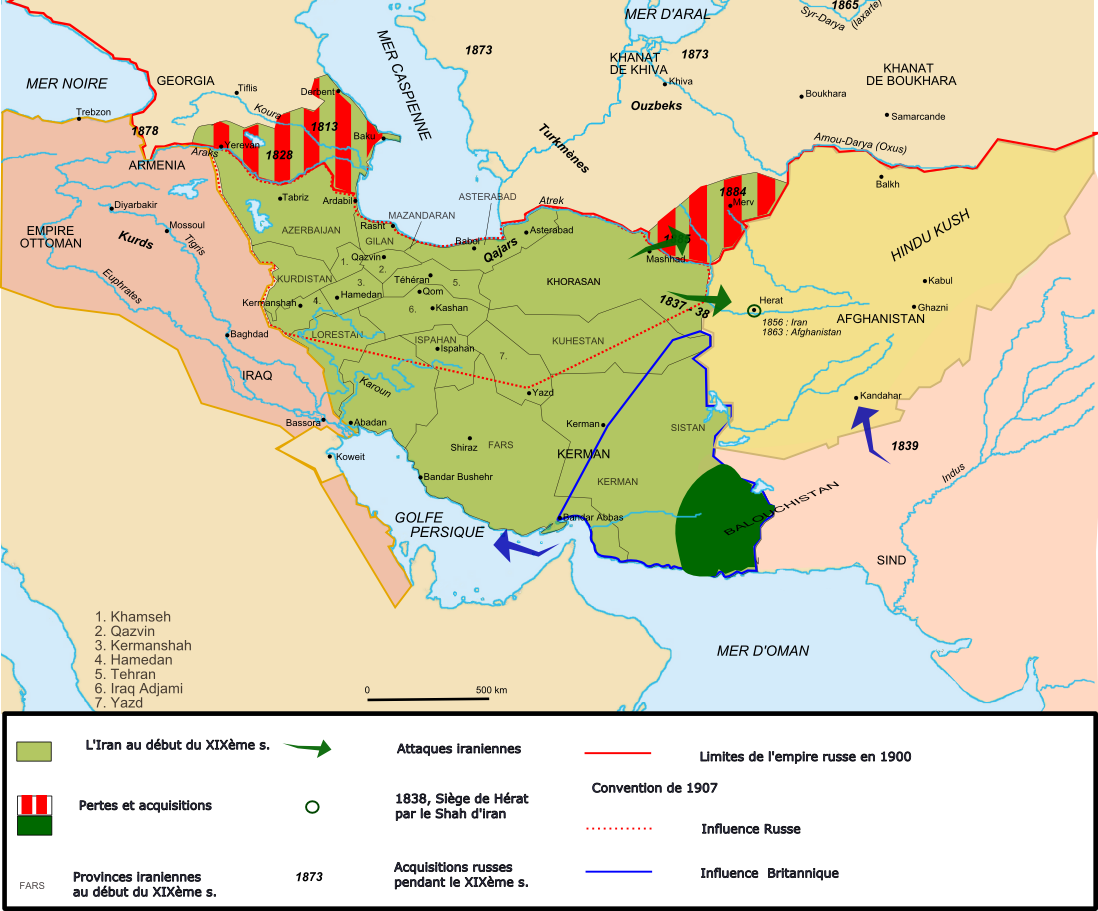
- Qajar Iran's loss of territories across the 19th century
- Location: Tehran
- Effective: 21 September 1881
- Signatories: (Russian Empire) Ivan Zinovyev; Mirza Saeed Khan Ansari

The Treaty of Akhal (Russian: Ахалский договор, Persian: پیمان آخال), also known as Akhal-Khorasan Boundary Convention, was an agreement signed between Qajar Iran and Imperial Russia on 21 September 1881 to mark Iran's official recognition of Khwarazm's (mostly the territory of present-day Turkmenistan) annexation by the Russian Empire.

The title of the treaty is derived from the name of the vast region north of Khorasan where the Turkmen tribe of Tekke lived – Akhal.

== Background ==
In 1856, Russia was defeated in the Crimean War by the coalition of British, French and Ottoman forces, which altered the direction of Russian expansion from Europe to Central Asia. Pursuing their policy of territorial expansion, Russians first captured Tashkent in 1865 before establishing a protectorate over the Emirate of Bukhara in 1868. Russia also gained Samarqand and was paid war reparations as a result of its victory over Bukhara. In 1869, Russia marked its presence in the south-east coast of the Caspian sea by founding a naval base in Krasnovodsk (present-day Turkmenbashy, Turkmenistan) and fortifying it. Subsequently, Russian diplomats in Tehran assured the Persian court that Russia recognized Iran's border along the entire length of Atrek river and did not contemplate to establish military bases there.

Russia's imperialistic ambitions soon led to the seizure of Khiva and Khoqand in 1873 and 1876 respectively, and later to the capture of the fortress of Geok-tepe after two military expeditions against Turkmens in 1879 and 1881. With the fall of the last stronghold of Turkmens, Russia enforced the Akhal Treaty on Qajar Iran.

Naser al-Din Shah Qajar sent foreign secretary Mirza Saeed Khan Ansari to meet Russian envoy Ivan Zinovyev and sign a treaty in Tehran.

== Treaty ==
Akhal Treaty, also known as Akhal-Khorasan Treaty, was signed on 21 September 1881 and marked Persia's official recognition of Khwarazm's (mostly the territory of present-day Turkmenistan) annexation by the Imperial Russia. The title of the treaty is derived from the name of the region north of Kopet Dag mountains in Khorasan where the Turkmen tribe of Tekke lived – Akhal.

Akhal Treaty consisted of 9 Articles. However, the signatories also signed a separate document with 5 secret clauses in addition to the Treaty on the same day. By virtue of the Treaty, Iran would henceforth cease any claim to all parts of Turkestan and Transoxiana, setting the Atrek River as the new boundary. Hence Merv, Sarakhs, Eshgh Abad, and the surrounding areas comprising modern-day Turkmenistan were transferred to Russia, where they would be the Transcaspian Oblast.

== See also ==
- Akhal-Teke
- Battle of Geok Tepe
- List of treaties
- Treaty of Turkmenchay
- Treaty of Gulistan
