= Hoda Saber =

- هدی صابر
- Born: Hoda Rezazadeh Saber; Persian: هدی رضازاده صابر; March 19, 1959; Tehran, Iran
- Died: June 10, 2011 (aged 52); Tehran, Iran
- Occupations: Intellectual, Economic scholar and social activist, Journalist
- Political party: Nationalist-Religious movement
- Spouse: Farideh (Roghayyeh) Jamshidi
- Children: 2

Hoda Rezazadeh Saber (Persian: هدی رضازاده صابر; 19 March 1959 – 10 June 2011) was an Iranian intellectual, economic scholar, journalist and social-political activist. He served several prison terms since 2000, and died while on a hunger strike in prison protesting the death of Haleh Sahabi.

== Career ==
Saber played a leading role in the magazine Iran-e Farda (Iran of Tomorrow), which was published from 1992 to 2000. Saber was devoted to social justice. In later years he worked in Sistan and Baluchestan, both major drug-trafficking routes from neighbouring Pakistan and Afghanistan. Saber’s employability-training programme, aimed to help over a thousand underprivileged young people escape the poverty of their drug infested surroundings.

== Arrests ==
Saber was arrested several times, often with two other nationalist-religious journalist/activists, Reza Alijani and Taghi Rahmani. He was first arrested on 28 January 2000, and released a month and a half later after posting bail. On 12 April 2003, Saber was sentenced to ten years of imprisonment and banned from any "social activity" for ten years. After being released on appeal, Saber (along with Alijani and Rahmani) was arrested again in June 2003 and spent three months in solitary confinement. On 14 October 2003, the judiciary spokesman, announced that Saber, Alijani and Rahmani had begun serving their sentences. In August 2006, an appeals court sentenced Rahmani and Saber to eight months in jail for "helping to found an illegal NGO", though, according to Tehran Bureau journalist Muhammad Sahimi, the organization in question had been registered with the Ministry of Interior. Saber was arrested again on 23 July 2010 to complete the serving of his old sentence of ten years. According to Sahimi, this was "despite the fact that his appeal had never been taken up and so much time had passed since the original verdict that, according to the law, the case should have been closed."

== Hunger strike and death ==
On 2 June 2011, Saber and another nationalist-religious figure, Amir Khosrow Dalirsani, stopped eating food and later stopped drinking water to protest "the conditions that led to the death of Haleh Sahabi", and the government's crackdown against protesters. Saber was in imprisoned in Ward 350 of Evin Prison at the time. According to Muhammad Sahimi, eyewitnesses have said that during the six hours between the time he first complained of chest pain early Friday morning and when he was finally taken for medical treatment, Saber was screaming loudly in agony, but prison staff paid no attention to him. According to Melli Mazhabi, Saber's cellmates announced their readiness to testify in any court as to how his condition and cries were ignored.

Saber died of a heart attack at Tehran's Modarres Hospital on 10 June 2011, aged 52. He was brought to the hospital for surgery to open his clogged arteries, but the hunger strike had damaged his heart and prevented a successful surgery. Saber's wife, Farideh Jamshidi, told The Guardian: "My husband died two days ago, but we were unaware of his death until today when someone in the hospital informed one of our friends." Jamshidi demanded that the hospital turn the body of her husband over to her, as his corpse had reportedly been taken to the morgue for an autopsy. Eyewitnesses said that during the six hours between the time he first complained of chest pain early Friday morning and when he was finally taken for medical treatment, Saber was screaming loudly in agony, but prison staff paid no attention to him. According to Melli Mazhabi, the website of the Nationalist-Religious Coalition, Saber's cellmates announced their readiness to testify in any court as to how his condition and cries were ignored.

She said Saber stopped eating food and later stopped drinking water in protest at the death of his fellow dissident Haleh Sahabi, She died of a heart attack during scuffles with security forces at the funeral of her father, Ezatollah Sahabi, the leader of the Nationalist-Religious alliance of politicians, on 1 June.

Jamshidi accused prison officials of negligence toward her husband, saying she received reports that they delayed transferring him to hospital for six hours.

"Doctors told us later that they could have saved his life by taking him to the hospital earlier. We were supposed to visit him in the prison tomorrow and now we have to visit his dead body in the cemetery."Hours after his death his sister, Firouzeh Saber, complained to Radio Farda of three concerns: "First of all, why was he in prison? He had been in prison without having been sentenced. Second, why did a tragedy such as [Sahabi's] death happen, leading [Saber] to go on hunger strike? And third, why were [authorities] so careless that it took them several hours to take him to the hospital" after he complained of chest pains.

On 12 June 2011, Reporters Without Borders issued a statement accusing the government of the Islamic Republic of responsibility for the death of Hoda Saber by neglecting his medical needs and by arbitrarily arresting him in the first place.

Iran's Fars news agency denied the family's allegations and said Saber had received medical care before his death. It accused the opposition of politicising his death.

== See also ==
- Ezatollah Sahabi
- Haleh Sahabi
