= Karim Khodapanahi =

Iranian politician (born 1941)

- کریم خداپناهی

Acting Minister of Foreign Affairs
- In office 3 August 1980 – 11 March 1981
- Prime Minister: Mohammad-Ali Rajai
- Preceded by: Sadegh Ghotbzadeh
- Succeeded by: Mohammad-Ali Rajai (acting)

Personal details
- Born: Mohammad Karim Khodapanahi; 1941 (age 84–85)

Mohammad-Karim Khodapanahi (Persian: محمدکریم خداپناهی; born 1941) is an Iranian politician. He was the acting foreign minister of Iran between 1980 and 1981.

== Biography ==
Khodapanahi served as the acting minister of foreign affairs from 3 August 1980 to 11 March 1981 in the cabinet led by Prime Minister Mohammad-Ali Rajai. He replaced Sadegh Ghotbzadeh in the post. Mohammad-Ali Rajai succeeded Khodapanahi as acting foreign minister.
