= Mirza Mohammad-Ali Khan Shirazi =

Iranian politician

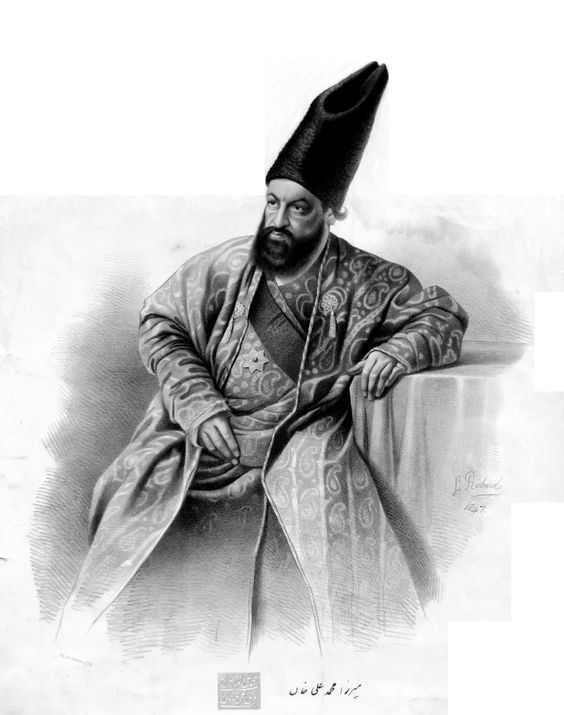
- Drawing of Mirza Mohammad-Ali Khan Shirazi in 1847

Minister of Foreign Affairs
- In office July 1851 – 9 February 1852
- Monarch: Naser al-Din Shah Qajar
- Preceded by: Amir Kabir
- Succeeded by: Mirza Saeed Khan Ansari

Head of the Dar ul-Funun
- In office 29 December 1851 – 9 February 1852
- Succeeded by: Aziz Khan Mokri

Personal details
- Born: c. 1780 Shiraz, Zand Iran
- Died: 9 February 1852 (aged 71–72) Tehran, Qajar Iran
- Relatives: Mirza Abolhassan Khan Ilchi (uncle)

Mirza Mohammad-Ali Khan Shirazi (Persian: میرزا محمدعلی خان شیرازی; c. 1780 – 9 February 1852) was an Iranian diplomat who served as the minister of foreign affairs from July 1851 to 9 February 1852. He also served as the ambassador to France in 1847, confirmed the Second Treaty of Erzurum with the Ottoman Empire in 1848, and from 29 December 1851 served as the head of the Dar ul-Funun, whose establishment marked the start of modern education in Iran.

Born in c. 1780 in Shiraz, Mohammad-Ali Khan was the nephew of Mirza Abolhassan Khan Ilchi, and served as his main secretary during his diplomatic missions to Russia in 1815 and to Britain in 1818–1819. When Mohammad-Ali Khan returned from Europe in 1824, he became the secretary of the Foreign Ministry in the capital of Tehran. In 1847, he was appointed as Iran's ambassador to France, aiming to improve trade relations, inquire about the situation of the five Iranian students there, and make the French envoy Eugene de Sartiges gain permission to represent the French government as an envoy extraordinary in Tehran.

During this period, Mohammad-Ali Khan was also tasked with confirming the Second Treaty of Erzurum with the Ottoman Empire, which eventually happened in 1848. In July 1851, he was appointed the minister of foreign affairs, and on 29 December 1851, he became the first head of the Dar ul-Funun college. He died of illness on 9 February 1852.

== Biography ==
=== Background and early career ===
A son of Mohammad Esmail, Mirza Mohammad-Ali Khan Shirazi was born in c. 1780 in the city of Shiraz in the Fars province of southwestern Iran. During this period, the city served as the capital of the Zand dynasty, but in 1791, it was conquered by the Qajar shah (king) Agha Mohammad Khan Qajar (r. 1789–1797). Mohammad-Ali Khan was also the nephew of the Iranian diplomat Mirza Abolhassan Khan Ilchi, under whom he served as his main secretary during his diplomatic missions to Russia in 1815 and to Britain in 1818–1819. The British envoy Gore Ouseley had promised to help return some of the lands lost to Russia at the time of the Treaty of Golestan in October 1813, and the goal of these missions was thus to negotiate this goal with Russia and Britain. While traveling through France en route to Britain, Mohammad-Ali Khan was so fascinated by Paris that he composed a poem praising the city. After that, he spent a year living in Paris and made extensive trips around Europe.

Following his return from Europe in 1824, Mohammad-Ali Khan was named secretary of the Foreign Ministry in the capital of Tehran, where he was in charge of receiving foreign envoys. The Foreign Ministry was headed by Mirza Abolhassan, whom Mohammad-Ali Khan became deputy to during the reign of Mohammad Shah Qajar (r. 1834–1848). Following Mirza Abolhassan's death in 1845, Mohammad-Ali Khan gained his seat at the public assembly of the shah and was given the title khan by Mohammad Shah.

=== Diplomatic mission to France and confirmation of the Second Treaty of Erzurum with the Ottoman Empire ===
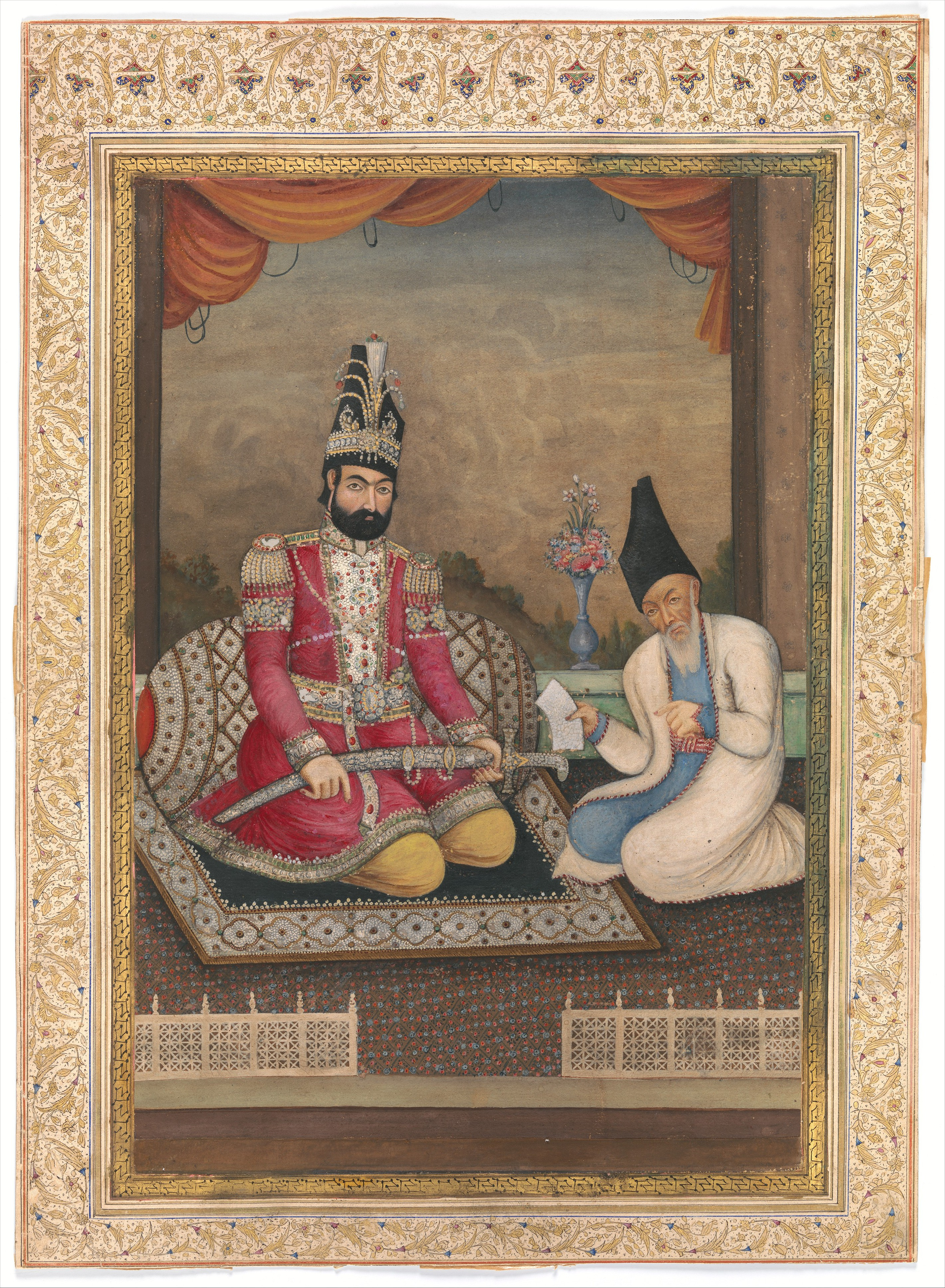
Portrait of Mohammad Shah Qajar and Haji Mirza Aqasi, second quarter of the 19th-century

To improve relations between Iran and France, the grand vizier Haji Mirza Aqasi dispatched Mohammad-Ali Khan as an ambassador to France in June 1847. As a way of enhancing Mohammad-Ali Khan's prestige as the ambassador to France, Mohammad Shah gave him the Order of the Lion and the Sun. A month before this, Eugene de Sartiges, the French envoy in Tehran, received a farman (decree) that benefitted French merchants. This farman stated that French nationals were entitled to trade benefits in Iran, but Iranian merchants in France did not get the same benefits. Therefore, the primary responsibility of Mohammad-Ali Khan was to ensure that Iranian merchants in France enjoyed the same benefits as the French did in Iran. He also had other smaller objectives; to discuss the livelihood and educational circumstances of five Iranian students who were sent to France in 1845 by Aqasi to pursue their studies under Alix Desgranges's tutelage; and make Eugene de Sartiges—who had been dispatched to Iran without an official title—gain permission to represent the French government as an envoy extraordinary in Tehran.

Before travelling to France, Mohammad-Ali Khan was also given the objective to confirm the Second Treaty of Erzurum with the Ottoman Empire, which was signed on 31 May 1847. He was ordered to stay in the Ottoman capital Constantinople for two weeks to negotiate a number of problems including the status of Iranian pilgrims and merchants passing through Ottoman lands, the definition the frontiers, and tribes spanning the Ottoman-Iranian borders. The delegates of Russia and Britain urged Mohammad-Ali Khan to stay longer so that the Iranians and Ottomans could exchange the confirmed treaty, which he did not have with him. Aqasi dispatched the confirmed treaty to Mohammad-Ali Khan, giving him permission to make the exchange in response to pressure from the mediating British and Russian diplomats in Tehran. However, Mohammad-Ali Khan was advised not to postpone his trip to Paris by Eugene de Sartiges and the French envoy in Constantinople, François-Adolphe de Bourqueney, as he was not supposed to stay in Constantinople for longer than two weeks. After several months of waiting, on 26 August 1847, Mohammad-Ali Khan finally left for France.

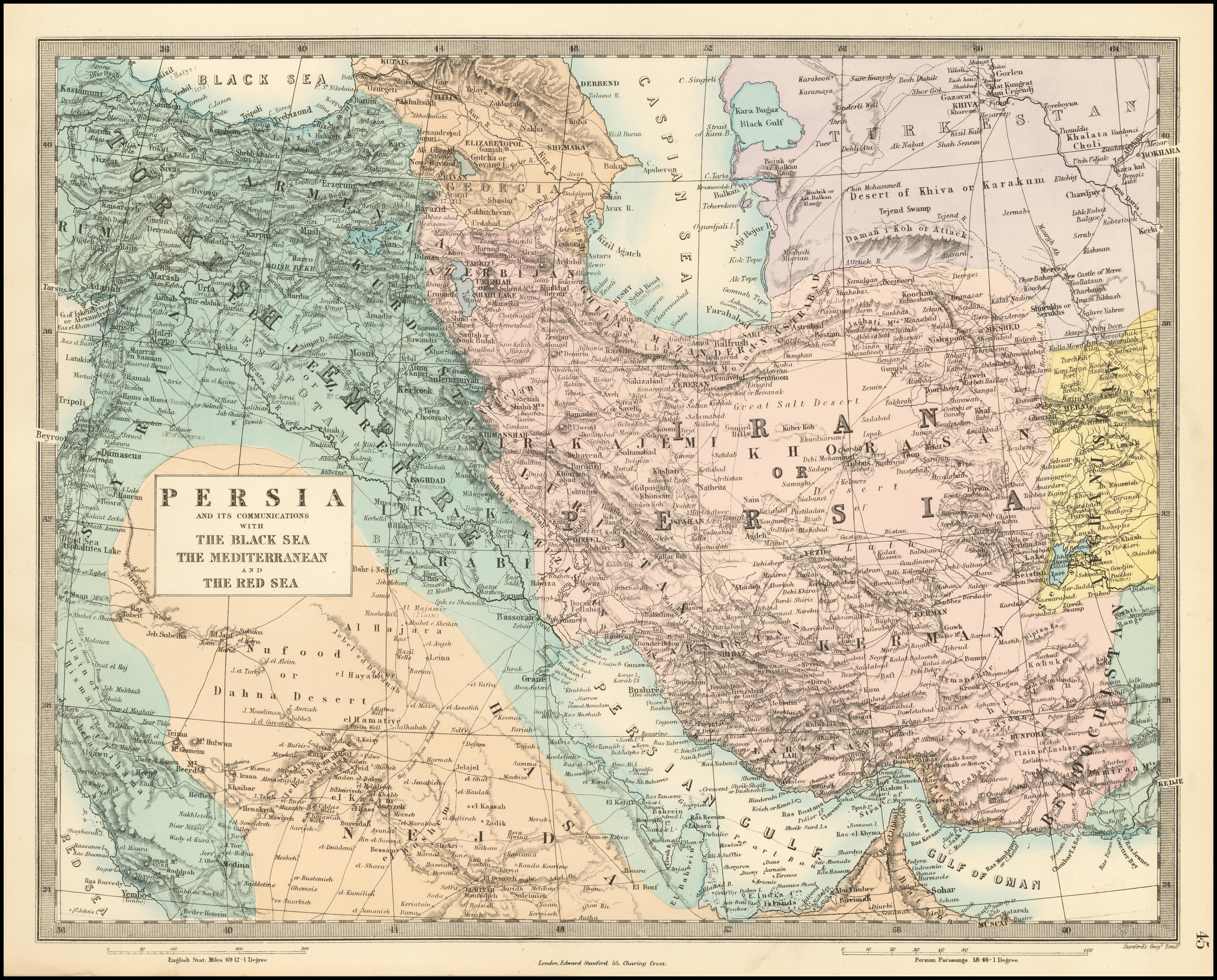
Map of the Near East in 1860, showing the borders of Iran (purple) and the Ottoman Empire (blue)

A letter of Mohammad Shah and royal gifts—including a diamond-studded portrait of Mohammad Shah—were presented by Mohammad-Ali Khan to the French king Louis Philippe I (r. 1830–1848) during an audience in the Château de Compiègne in northern France on 23 September 1847. During his time in Paris, Mohammad-Ali Khan placed orders for a large shipment of books on science, literature, encyclopedias, dictionaries, maps, and scientific equipment to be sent to Iran, all on the advice of Jules Richard (known in Persian as Rishar Khan), a Frenchman working for the Iranian government.

Mohammad-Ali Khan was frequently ordered by Aqasi (who was still under British and Russian pressure) to return to Constantinople to finish the confirmation of the Second Treaty of Erzurum. Mohammad-Ali Khan departed Paris on 25 December 1847, having spent four months in France. After a three-month negotiation period in Constantinople, at his own risk Mohammad-Ali Khan ultimately signed a note of clarification to the treaty intended to alleviate Ottoman concerns about some parts of the treaty's provisions, most notably the one about sovereignty over the river of Shatt al-Arab and its left bank, which was ambiguously defined in Article 2.

Jafar Khan Moshir od-Dowleh, the Iranian delegate to the Erzurum delimitation commission in 1850, later claimed that Mohammad-Ali Khan had accepted an Ottoman bribe of 4,000 toman in the guise of a royal gift for his signature on the note of clarification, which the Iranian government had not supported. However, Mohammad-Ali Khan gave Aqasi thorough updates on his discussions with mediating British and Russian delegates in Constantinople and told him that if he had not signed the note, the Ottomans might have dropped the treaty. The diplomats were also told by Mohammad-Ali Khan that his approval of the note was "a short-term measure to prevent the failure of negotiations" and that the Iranian government's consent was the only reason it was acknowledged.

In the years after the signature of the treaty, the Ottoman and Iranian governments both took advantage of the ambiguity in Article 2. This also continued between Iran and Iraq, who both differently interpreted the article's reference to Iranian vessels having "free navigation rights", an issue that reached its zenith in 1920s and 1930s, and would infrequently occur afterwards.

=== Tenure as Minister of Foreign Affairs and death ===
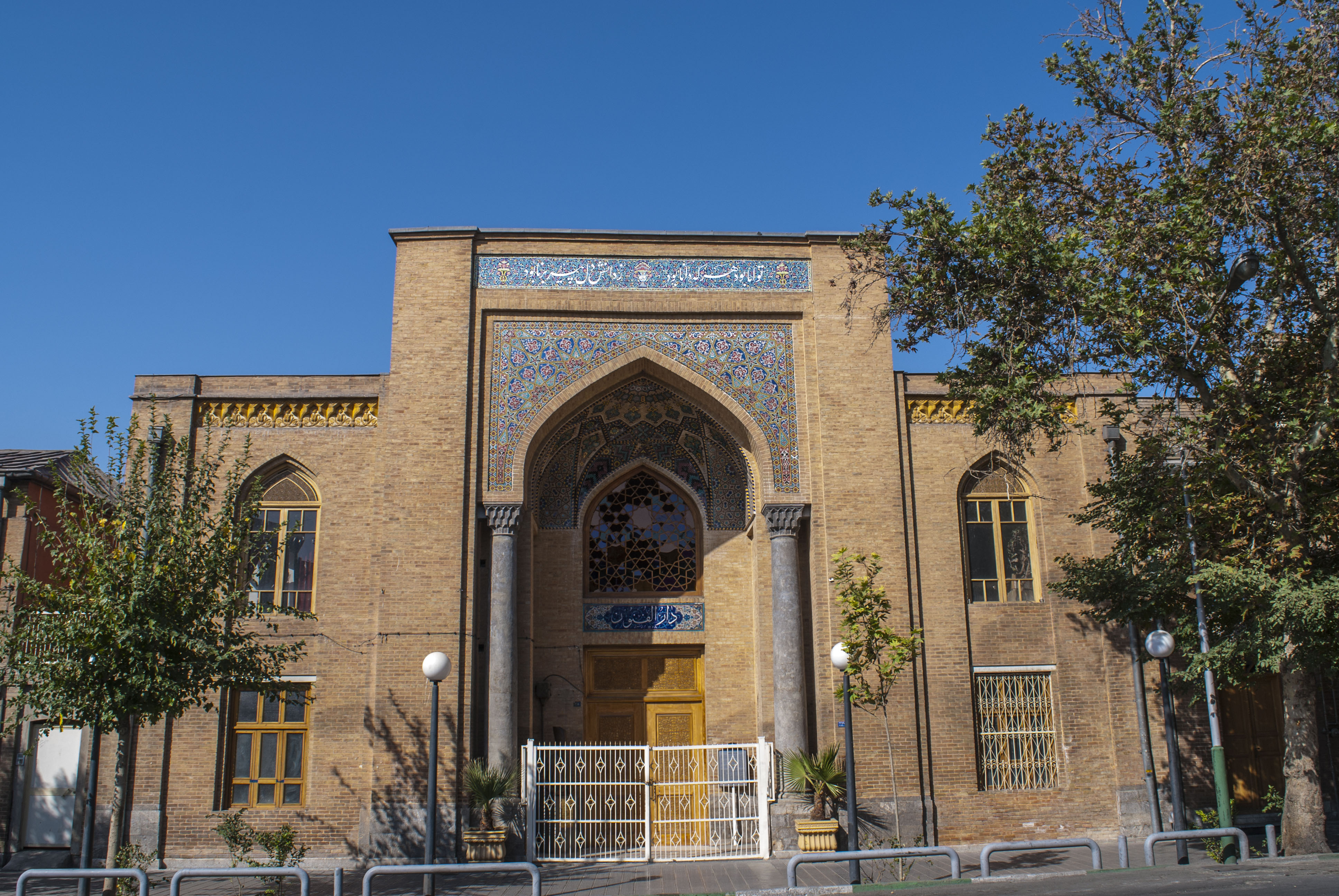
The Dar ul-Funun college in Tehran

During the reign of Naser al-Din Shah Qajar (r. 1848–1896), Mohammad-Ali Khan continued to serve as the deputy of the Foreign Ministry, which was controlled by the premier Amir Kabir. In July 1851, Naser al-Din Shah appointed Mohammad-Ali Khan as the new minister of foreign affairs. On 29 December 1851, Amir Kabir chose Mohammad-Ali Khan to be the first head of the new Dar ul-Funun college in Tehran, whose foundation marked the start of modern education in the country. Approximately a month before this took place (18/19 November), Mirza-Mohammad Ali wrote a letter to the kalantar (mayor) of Tehran, Mahmud Khan, and the military commander Aziz Khan Mokri. The name of Dar-ul Funun is first attested in that letter, which also says that Mirza-Mohammad Ali had, with the approval of Naser al-Din Shah, sent thirty aristocratic and princely children to the newly established college.

Mohammad-Ali Khan died of illness on 9 February 1852 in Tehran. Aziz Khan Mokri succeeded him as the head of Dar-ul Funun.

== Sources ==
- Gurney, John; Nabavi, Negin (1993). "Dār al-fonūn". In Yarshater, Ehsan (ed.). Encyclopædia Iranica. Vol. VI/6: Daf(f) and Dāyera–Dārā. London and New York: Routledge & Kegan Paul. pp. 662–668. ISBN 978-1-56859-004-2.
- Mousavi, Mehdi (2022). "Moḥammad-ʿAli Khan Širāzi, Mirzā". In Yarshater, Ehsan (ed.). Encyclopædia Iranica (Online ed.). Encyclopædia Iranica Foundation.
- Shahbazi, A. Shapur (2004). "Shiraz i. History to 1940". Encyclopaedia Iranica.
- Schofield, Richard (2004). Potter, Lawrence G.; Sick, Gary G. (eds.). Iran, Iraq, and the Legacies of War. Palgrave Macmillan New York. doi:10.1057/9781403980427. ISBN 978-1-4039-6450-2.

Preceded by Amir Kabir	Minister of Foreign Affairs; July 1851 – 9 February 1852	Succeeded by Mirza Saeed Khan Ansari
