= Minister of Foreign Affairs (Iran) =

Government official in Iran

Minister of Foreign Affairs of the Islamic Republic of Iran
- وزیر امور خارجه ایران
- Logo of the Ministry of Foreign Affairs

- Incumbent; Abbas Araghchi since 21 August 2024
- Ministry of Foreign Affairs
- Nominator: The president
- Appointer: Iranian Parliament
- Formation: October 1821 (original); 1 April 1979 (current form)
- First holder: Neshat Esfahani
- Website: www.mfa.gov.ir

The minister of foreign affairs of Iran (Persian: وزیر امور خارجه ایران, romanized: Vazir Amor Kharjeh Iran) is the head of the Ministry of Foreign Affairs of Iran and a member of the Cabinet. The office is currently held by Abbas Araghchi since 2024.

== Duties ==
Functions of the minister have largely been moved to the Strategic Council on Foreign Relations.

== List of ministers ==
=== Qajar Iran ===
No.	Portrait	Name (Birth–Death)	Term of office		
No.	Portrait	Name (Birth–Death)	Took office	Left office	Duration
1		Mirza Abdolvahab Khan Mo'tamed od-Dowleh Neshat (1759–1829)	1821	1823	1–2 years
2		Mirza Abolhassan Khan Ilchi (1776–1845)	1823	1834	10–11 years
3		Mirza Ali Farahani	1834	1835	0–1 years
4		Mirza Mas'ud Khan Ansari	1835	1838	2–3 years
5		Mirza Abolhassan Khan Ilchi (1776–1845)	1838	1845	6–7 years
—		Haji Mirza Aqasi (c. 1783–1849); Acting	1845	1846	0–1 years
6		Mirza Mas'ud Khan Ansari	1846	1849	2–3 years
—		Amir Kabir (1807–1851); Acting	1849	1851	1–2 years
7		Mirza Mohammad-Ali Khan Shirazi (c. 1780–1852)	18 July 1851	9 February 1852	206 days
8		Mirza Saeed Khan Ansari (1816–1884)	1853	1873	19–20 years
9		Mirza Hosein Khan Sepahsalar (1828–1881)	11 December 1873	1880	7–8 years
10		Mirza Saeed Khan Ansari (1816–1884)	1880	1884	3–4 years
11		Mirza Mahmoud Khan Naser ol-Molk	1884	1886	1–2 years
12		Mirza Yahya Khan Moshir od-Dowleh (1832–1892)	5 February 1886	1 August 1887	1 year, 177 days
13		Mirza Abbas Khan Qavam od-Dowleh	1887	29 June 1896	8–9 years
14		Mirza Mohsen Khan Moshir od-Dowleh	1896	1899	2–3 years
15		Mirza Nasrullah Khan (1840–1907)	1899	1906	6–7 years
16		Mohammad-Ali Ala ol-Saltaneh (1829–1918)	1906	15 September 1907	0–1 years
17		Javad Sad od-Dowleh	1907	1907	0 years
18		Hussein Kuli Khan Nawab (1864–1946)	1910	1911	0–1 years
...

=== Pahlavi Iran ===
No.	Portrait	Name (Birth–Death)	Term of office		
No.	Portrait	Name (Birth–Death)	Took office	Left office	Duration
1		Nosrat-ed-Dowleh (1889–1937)	1 October 1925	1 October 1938	13 years
2		Ali Soheili (1895–1958)	1 October 1938	7 March 1939	157 days
3		Mozaffar Alam (1882–1973)	7 March 1939	20 April 1943	4 years, 44 days
4		Hossein Ala' (1881–1964)	25 April 1943	2 March 1945	1 year, 311 days
5		Mahmoud Salehi	2 March 1945	2 May 1945	61 days
6		Mohsen Rais (1895–1975)	2 May 1945	4 May 1945	2 days
7		Bagher Kazemi (1892–1977)	4 May 1945	7 April 1946	338 days
8		Hossein Navab (1897–1972)	7 April 1946	13 January 1950	3 years, 281 days
9		Ali Akbar Siassi (1896–1990)	13 January 1950	24 February 1950	42 days
10		Hossein Navab (1897–1972)	24 February 1950	28 April 1951	1 year, 63 days
11		Bagher Kazemi (1892–1977)	28 April 1951	16 July 1952	1 year, 79 days
12		Hossein Navab (1897–1972)	21 July 1952	16 September 1952	57 days
13		Hossein Fatemi (1917–1954)	16 September 1952	19 August 1953	337 days
14		Abdol-Hossein Meftah	23 August 1953	20 September 1953	28 days
15		Abdollah Entezam (1895–1983)	20 September 1953	25 December 1955	2 years, 96 days
16		Aligholi Ardalan (1900–1986)	25 December 1955	10 May 1958	2 years, 136 days
17		Ali-Asghar Hekmat (1892–1980)	10 May 1958	11 June 1959	1 year, 32 days
18		Jalal Abdoh (1906–1996)	13 June 1959	3 August 1959	51 days
19		Abbas Aram (1906–1985)	3 August 1959	29 August 1960	1 year, 26 days
20		Yadallah Adhdi	31 August 1960	21 February 1961	174 days
—		Hossein Ghods-Nakhai (1894–1977); Acting	11 March 1961	31 March 1962	1 year, 20 days
21		Abbas Aram (1906–1985)	1 April 1962	12 January 1967	4 years, 286 days
22		Ardeshir Zahedi (1928–2021)	12 January 1967	12 September 1971	4 years, 243 days
23		Abbas Ali Khalatbari (1912–1979)	13 September 1971	16 September 1978	7 years, 3 days
24		Amir Khosrow Afshar (1919–1999)	16 September 1978	6 January 1979	112 days
25		Ahmad Mirfendereski (1918–2004)	6 January 1979	11 February 1979	36 days

=== Islamic Republic of Iran ===
No.	Portrait	Name (Birth–Death)	Term of office			Political party	Government
No.	Portrait	Name (Birth–Death)	Took office	Left office	Duration	Political party	Government
1	Karim Sanjabi	Karim Sanjabi (1904–1995)	11 February 1979	1 April 1979	49 days	NF	Interim Government
–	Mehdi Bazargan	Mehdi Bazargan (1907–1995); Acting	1 April 1979	12 April 1979	11 days	FMI	Interim Government
2	Ebrahim Yazdi	Ebrahim Yazdi (1931–2017)	12 April 1979	12 November 1979	214 days	FMI	Interim Government
–	Abolhassan Banisadr	Abolhassan Banisadr (1933–2021); Acting	12 November 1979	29 November 1979	17 days	Independent	Interim Government
3	Sadegh Ghotbzadeh	Sadegh Ghotbzadeh (1936–1982)	29 November 1979	3 August 1980	248 days	Independent	Interim Government
–	Karim Khodapanahi	Karim Khodapanahi (born 1944); Acting	3 August 1980	11 March 1981	220 days	FMI	Rajai
–	Mohammad-Ali Rajai[citation needed]	Mohammad-Ali Rajai (1933–1981); Acting	11 March 1981	15 August 1981	157 days	IRP	Rajai
4	Mir-Hossein Mousavi	Mir-Hossein Mousavi (born 1942)	15 August 1981	15 December 1981	122 days	IRP	Rajai; Bahonar; Interim Government; Mousavi I
5	Ali Akbar Velayati	Ali Akbar Velayati (born 1945)	15 December 1981	20 August 1997	15 years, 248 days	IRP; IAPI; ICP	Mousavi I–II; Rafsanjani I–II
6	Kamal Kharazi	Kamal Kharazi (1944–2026)	20 August 1997	24 August 2005	8 years, 4 days	Independent	Khatami I–II
7	Manouchehr Mottaki	Manouchehr Mottaki (born 1953)	24 August 2005	13 December 2010	5 years, 111 days	FFLIL	Ahmadinejad I–II
–	Ali Akbar Salehi	Ali Akbar Salehi (born 1949); Acting	13 December 2010	30 January 2011	48 days	Independent	Ahmadinejad II
8	Ali Akbar Salehi	Ali Akbar Salehi (born 1949)	30 January 2011	15 August 2013	2 years, 197 days	Independent	Ahmadinejad II
9	Mohammad Javad Zarif	Mohammad Javad Zarif (born 1960)	15 August 2013	25 August 2021	8 years, 10 days	Independent	Rouhani I–II
10	Hossein Amir-Abdollahian	Hossein Amir-Abdollahian (1964–2024)	25 August 2021	19 May 2024	2 years, 268 days	Independent	Raisi
–	Ali Bagheri Kani	Ali Bagheri Kani (born 1967); Acting	20 May 2024	21 August 2024	93 days	Independent	Interim Government
11	Abbas Araghchi	Abbas Araghchi (born 1962)	21 August 2024	Incumbent	2 years, 63 days	Independent	Pezeshkian

== See also ==
- Ministry of Foreign Affairs
- Cabinet of Iran
