= Mirza Saeed Khan Ansari =

Iranian foreign minister (1853–1873)

Mirza Saeed Khan Ansari Sa'id Mo'tamen ol-Molk
- میرزا سعید خان انصاری
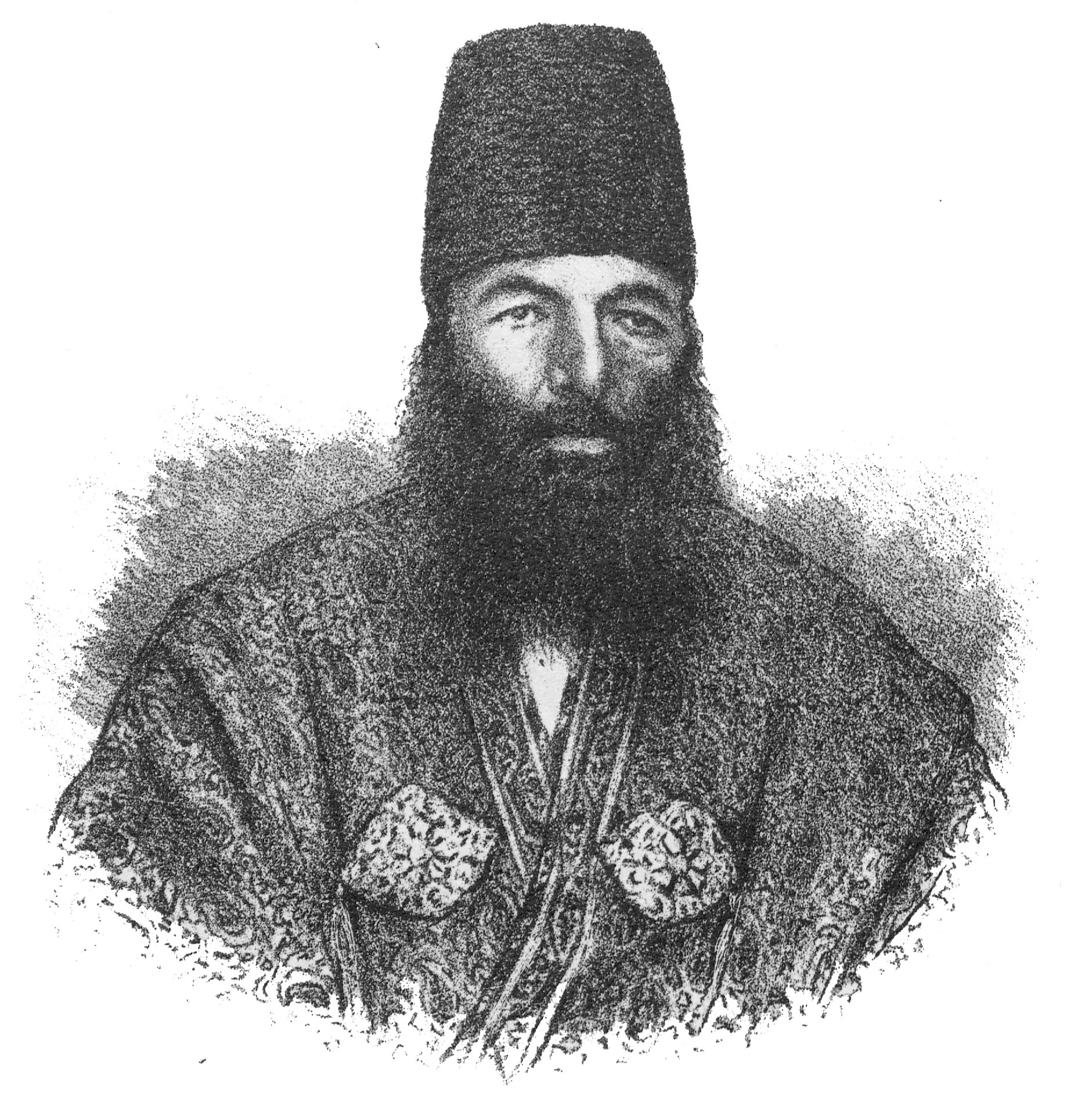
- Portrait of Sa'id Mo'tamen ol-Molk by Abu Torab Ghaffari, dated 1883.

Minister of Foreign Affairs
- In office 1853–1873
- Monarch: Naser al-Din Shah Qajar
- Preceded by: Mirza Mohammad-Ali Khan Shirazi
- Succeeded by: Mirza Hosein Khan Sepahsalar
- In office 1880–1884
- Monarch: Naser al-Din Shah Qajar
- Preceded by: Mirza Hosein Khan Sepahsalar
- Succeeded by: Mirza Mahmoud Khan Naser ol-Molk

Personal details
- Born: 1816 Meyaneh (Ishlaq), Qajar Iran
- Died: 1884 (aged 67–68) Tehran, Qajar Iran
- Known for: Treaty of Akhal

Mirza Saeed Khan Ansari (Persian: میرزا سعید خان انصاری), or simply Sa'id Mo'tamen ol-Molk (Persian: سعید مؤتمن‌الملک) (1816 in Meyaneh (Ishlaq) – 1884 in Tehran), was the foreign minister of Iran (Persia) during the Qajar era under Naser ed-Din Shah Qajar between 1853 and 1873. He is probably best known as a signatory of the 1881 Akhal Treaty.
