= Haleh Sahabi =

Iranian humanitarian activist (1958–2011)

Haleh Sahabi هاله سحابی
- Born: 4 February 1958; Tehran, Iran
- Died: 1 June 2011 (aged 53); Tehran, Iran
- Political party: Nationalist-Religious
- Spouse: Taghi Shamekhi
- Children: Yahya, Amene, Asie

Haleh Sahabi (Persian: هاله سحابی, 4 February 1958 – 1 June 2011) was an Iranian humanitarian and democracy activist. She was the daughter of former Iranian MP and veteran opposition figure Ezzatollah Sahabi, and the granddaughter of Yadollah Sahabi. She died at her father's funeral from cardiac arrest, the cause of her cardiac arrest however is disputed.

== Personal life ==
Sahabi was born on 4 February 1958, in Tehran, Iran, daughter of Ezatollah Sahabi, and Zarrindokht Ataei, whose maternal uncle was Mehdi Bazargan. She was married to Taghi Shamekhi and has a son named Yahya and two daughters, Amene and Asie.

== Arrest and imprisonment ==
Sahabi was a member of the "Mothers for Peace" group and a campaigner for women's rights. On 5 August 2009 she was arrested along with others in front of the parliament during President Mahmoud Ahmadinejad's second inauguration swearing-in ceremony. She was sentenced to two years in prison for "spreading propaganda against the regime" and "disrupting public order," but given temporary release for her father's funeral in May 2011.

== Death at father's funeral ==
During the funeral of her father, Ezattollah Sahabi, Sahabi reportedly got into an argument with several members of the Basij militia. According to her son Yahya Shamekhi,

"When we took the body of my grandfather out for the funeral ceremony, officials tried to stop the ceremony - that made the atmosphere very agitated, ... Finally they forcefully grabbed the body and took it away. Then my mother fell down and became unconscious. The doctor told us she died because of a heart attack."

Eyewitnesses, confirming that Sahabi was beaten by security forces, include Ahmad Montazeri and Hamed Montazeri (son and grandson of Ayatollah Montazeri) and an unnamed journalist quoted by International Campaign for Human Rights in Iran. In an interview with the same radio, Hamed Montazeri said that

"I did witness a member of the forces hitting Ms. Sahabi on her upper body, and I testify that she fainted immediately after the strike. The offender hid in the crowd soon after that."

It has been the subject of speculation that her death may have been due to the injuries inflicted on her lung and intestines during the physical contacts. An anonymous person who claimed to be a surgeon that tried to save her at the last moments in a clinic in Tehran said in a video posted on YouTube that:

"When I visited this lady, she was very pale. I reject the cardiac arrest as the primary cause of death. I suppose that it should have been an internal bleeding, especially because she was so pale. I witnessed signs of beating on the left side of her abdomen right below her ribs, and guess that it should have been a severe injury to the spleen. She had the symptoms of acute abdomen; nevertheless, a final diagnosis could have been made only through autopsy."

However, later in an interview with Radio Farda, the family denied that any doctor was involved in the efforts to save her at the clinic.

Mark Toner, a US State Department spokesman later said eyewitness and reliable accounts of Haleh Sahabi's death at her father's funeral in Iran made it clear that Ms Sahabi died as a result of reprehensible actions taken by Iranian security forces.

On the other hand, the government insisted that Sahabi died of natural causes. The head of security at the Tehran governor's office, Alireza Janeh, denied there were any clashes at the funeral and stated Sahabi had died of heart problems exacerbated by "stress and hot weather". However, Tehran's temperature is reported to have been only 26 degrees Celsius at 6 am and 28 degrees at 7 am. Iranian government media have also stated Sahahbi died of "heart problems," and deny that there were any clashes between mourners and security forces, however the state-run IRNA news agency did report that security forces arrested five people who had intended to disrupt order. It did not elaborate further.

The International Campaign for Human Rights in Iran issued a statement calling the incident a "tragedy," that reveals "a deep contempt for traditions that belong to all Iranians". The campaign has called for the Iranian Judiciary to investigate the incident and to forbid physical or psychological assaults or any other form of interference by security forces at funeral observances. The governments of the US and UK have also asked the Iranian government to investigate the circumstances of Sahabi's death. Amnesty International, who had previously named her a prisoner of conscience for her detention, demanded that the Iranian government investigate her death "in full compliance with the UN Principles on the Effective Prevention and Investigation of Extra-legal, Arbitrary and Summary Executions".

=== Burial ===
Sahabi was buried in a small cemetery near Lavasan on the same evening shortly after her death. Her body was seized by the authorities immediately after death, and the authorities forced the family to attend the burial during the night time. Apparently, no autopsy was carried out to elucidate the cause of death. Only a small number of her family and friends were present in the burial. In an interview with VOA about Sahabi, Nobel Peace laureate Shirin Ebadi called this practice "corpse stealing" by the Islamic republic regime.

=== Commemoration ceremony ===
Three days after Sahabi's death, on 4 June 2011, several hundred protesters tried to gather in silent groups outside the Hosseiniyeh Ershad mosque in northern Tehran, a traditional site for reformists in the Iranian regime. But heavy presence of security forces resulted prevented them from reaching the mosque. The forces used batons and fired shots in the air to disperse them, and made several arrests.

=== Hoda Saber Hunger Strike ===
On 2 June 2011, Hoda Saber, stopped eating food and later stopped drinking water[3] to protest "the conditions that led to the death of Haleh Sahabi", and the government's crackdown against protesters. Saber was in imprisoned in Ward 350 of Evin Prison at the time. According to Muhammad Sahimi, eyewitnesses have said that during the six hours between the time he first complained of chest pain early Friday morning and when he was finally taken for medical treatment, Saber was screaming loudly in agony, but prison staff paid no attention to him. According to Melli Mazhabi, Saber's cellmates announced their readiness to testify in any court as to how his condition and cries were ignored.

Saber died of a heart attack at Tehran's Modarres Hospital on 10 June 2011, aged 52. He was brought to the hospital for surgery to open up his clogged arteries, but the hunger strike had damaged his heart and prevented a successful surgery. Saber's wife, Farideh Jamshidi, told the Guardian: "My husband died two days ago, but we were unaware of his death until today when someone in the hospital informed one of our friends." Farideh Jamshidi, Saber's wife, has been loudly demanding that the hospital turn the body of her husband over to her. His corpse has reportedly been taken to the morgue for an autopsy. Eyewitnesses have said that during the six hours between the time he first complained of chest pain early Friday morning and when he was finally taken for medical treatment, Saber was screaming loudly in agony, but prison staff paid no attention to him. According to Melli Mazhabi, the website of the Nationalist-Religious Coalition, Saber's cellmates announced their readiness to testify in any court as to how his condition and cries were ignored.

== See also ==
- Human rights in Iran
- Hoda Saber
