= Sadegh Ghotbzadeh =

Iranian politician (1936–1982)

- صادق قطب‌زاده
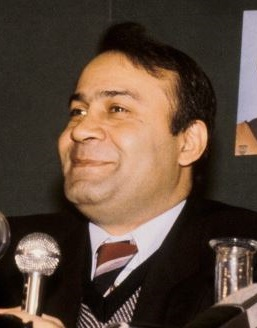
- Ghotbzadeh in 1980

Minister of Foreign Affairs
- In office 29 November 1979 – 3 August 1980
- President: Abolhassan Banisadr
- Prime Minister: Mohammad-Ali Rajaei
- Preceded by: Abolhassan Banisadr
- Succeeded by: Karim Khodapanahi

Head of National Radio and Television
- In office 11 February 1979 – 29 November 1979
- Appointed by: Council of the Revolution
- Preceded by: Reza Ghotbi
- Succeeded by: Provisional Council

Personal details
- Born: 24 February 1936 Esfahan, Iran
- Died: 16 September 1982 (aged 46) Evin Prison, Tehran, Iran
- Cause of death: Executed by firing squad
- Party: Freedom Movement of Iran (1961–1978); National Front (1953–1961)

Sadegh Ghotbzadeh (Persian: صادق قطب‌زاده, 24 February 1936 – 15 September 1982) was an Iranian politician who served as a close aide of Ayatollah Khomeini during his 1978 exile in France and was foreign minister (30 November 1979 – August 1980) during the Iran hostage crisis following the Iranian Revolution. In 1982, he was executed for allegedly plotting the assassination of Ayatollah Khomeini and the overthrow of the Islamic Republic.

== Early life and education ==
Ghotbzadeh was born in Esfahan in 1936. He had a sister and a brother. His father was a wealthy lumber merchant.

As a student, he was active in the student branch of the National Front following the toppling of Mohammad Mosaddegh in 1953. He left Iran in 1959 after being detained twice due to his opposition activities to the Shah's regime; he lived in Europe, the US and Canada. Ghotbzadeh was a supporter of the National Front of Iran. In addition he was one of the senior members of the Freedom Movement of Iran led by Mehdi Bazargan in the 1960s.

He attended Georgetown University's Walsh School of Foreign Service from 1959 to 1963. He contributed to the Freedom Movement from the US. He was part of the more radical wing of the movement together with Ebrahim Yazdi, Mostafa Chamran and Ali Shariati. However, he was dismissed from the school before graduating due to his skipping studies and exams to lead protests against the government of Mohammad Reza Pahlavi, including storming a posh party hosted by the then Iranian ambassador to the United States, the son-in-law of the Shah, Ardeshir Zahedi.

Ghotbzadeh left the US when his passport was revoked and moved to Algeria, Egypt, Syria and finally to Iraq, where he met Ayatollah Khomenei in 1963. In December of the same year Ghotbzadeh along with Chamran and Yazdi met the Egyptian authorities to establish an anti-Shah organization in the country, which was later called SAMA, special organization for unity and action. Chamran was chosen as its military head. Ghotbzadeh also developed a close relation with Musa Al Sadr, an Iranian-Lebanese Shia cleric. During his stay in the Middle East, Ghotbzadeh was trained in Lebanon together with Iranian revolutionary militants and Palestinians.

In the late 1960s, Ghotbzadeh went to Canada for higher education and graduated from now defunct Notre Dame University College in Nelson, BC, in 1969. Next he settled in Paris using his Syrian passport which he obtained through the help of Musa Al Sadr. There he worked as a correspondent for the Syrian government daily, Al Thawra. The job, in fact, was fake and covered his opposition activity in the city.

== Career and activities ==
Ghotbzadeh left the Freedom Movement in 1978. He became a close aide of Ayatollah Khomeini when the latter was in exile in France. Ghotbzadeh along with Mostafa Chamran was part of the faction, called "Syrian mafia", in the court of Khomeini, and there was a feud between his group and the Libya-friendly group, led by Mohammad Montazeri. Ghotbzadeh was an Amal sympathizer and close to Lebanese Shi'a cleric Musa as-Sadr. Khomeini appointed him a member of the follow-up mission to search for fate of Al Sadr following the latter's disappearance in August 1978.

Ghotbzadeh accompanied Khomeini on his Air France flight back to Iran on 1 February 1979. It was Ghotbzadeh, who translated the Ayatollah's infamous response "Nothing" to journalist Peter Jennings's question: "Ayatollah, would you be so kind as to tell us how you feel about being back in Iran?" He was also Khomeini's translator in the press conference held in Tehran on 3 February 1979.

Following the Iranian Revolution Ghotbzadeh became a member of the revolutionary council when Bazargan and others left the council to form an interim government. In addition, he served as spokesperson of the Ayatollah. He was also appointed managing director of National Iranian Radio and Television (NIRT) on 11 February 1979. He tried to overhaul it to be in line with Islamic teachings, purging royalists, women, and leftists. This was criticised by a group of Iranian intellectuals and also the interim government. On 13 March, two women, one with a gun and the other with a knife, attacked Ghotbzadeh protesting the fundamentalist policies of the Islamic regime. Nearly 15,000 women also gathered outside the headquarters of the NIRT to protest his Islamist policy.

He was appointed foreign minister in late November 1979 after Abolhassan Banisadr resigned as acting foreign minister amid heated disputes on the fate of the American hostages. In early 1980 Ghotbzadeh was involved in early Iran hostage crisis negotiations in Paris with Carter aide Hamilton Jordan, which led to "a complex multi-stepped plan" which was torpedoed by Khomeini announcing the hostages' fate would be decided by the new Iranian parliament.

Ghotbzadeh wrote an open letter to the Majlis in August 1980 arguing for the quick release of the hostages, and told Reuters five days later that "United States presidential candidate Ronald Reagan, supported by Kissinger and others, has no intention of solving the problem. They will do everything in their power to block it." In September and October, he made several other public statements alleging that a deal to delay the release of the hostages may have taken place. The French news agency Agence France Presse quoted him on 6 September as stating the "Reagan camp was trying hard to block a solution of the [hostage] problem before the elections" and that he had "information" to prove it. On 11 September, the open letter was published in an Iranian newspaper with similar charges. A decade later in 1991, Joseph E. Persico of The New York Times concluded a review of Gary Sick's book October Surprise stating: "Two friends of Ghotbzadeh who spoke to him frequently during this period said that he insisted repeatedly that the Republicans were in contact with elements in Iran to try to block a hostage release." The House October Surprise Task Force investigating the October Surprise allegations interviewed close associates of Ghotbzadeh and concluded in 1993 that they "uncovered nothing to corroborate Ghotbzadeh's statements".

After the failure of the rescue attempt decided upon by President Carter, he qualified this decision an "act of war" against Iran. However, Ghotbzadeh was not committed anti-American during his tenure.

In January 1980, Ghotbzadeh ran for the presidency, but lost the election. His tenure as foreign minister ended in August 1980 and he was replaced by Karim Khodapanahi in the post. Following his retirement from politics Ghotbzadeh dealt with his family trade in the importing business and studied Islamic law.

== Arrest and execution ==
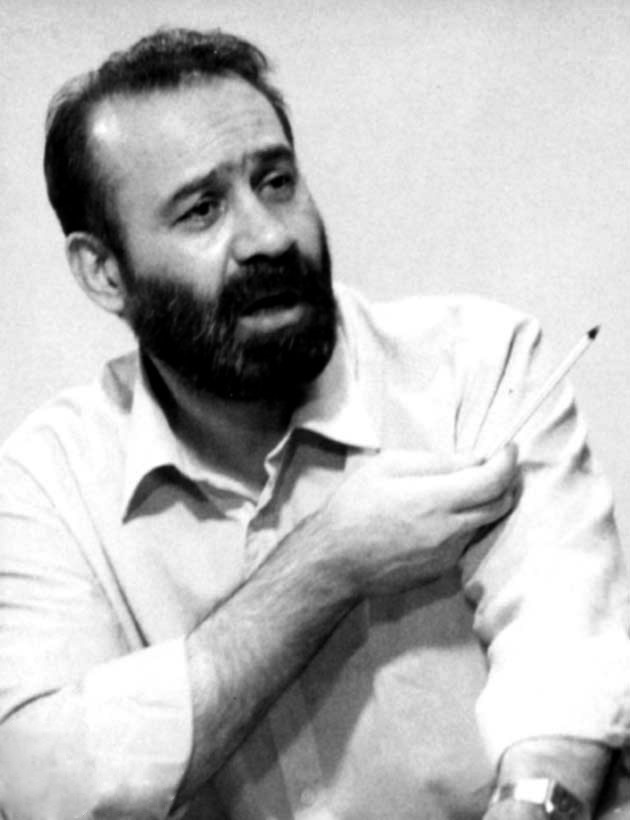
Ghotbzadeh defending himself at trial

Ghotbzadeh was first arrested on 7 November 1980 on charges of planning to kill Ayatollah Khomeini and criticising the Islamic Republic Party. He was detained in Evin Prison in Tehran. He was released on 10 November when Ayatollah Khomeini intervened.

On 8 April 1982, he was arrested along with a group of army officers and clerics (including a son-in-law of the religious leader Ayatollah Kazem Shariatmadari), all accused of plotting the assassination of Ayatollah Khomeini and overthrow of the Islamic Republic.

Hujjat al-Islam Mohammad Reyshahri, the chief judge of the newly created Military Revolutionary Tribunal, explained what the plot was about. He used "an elaborate chart full of boxes and arrows linking Ghotbzadeh and the royalist officers, on one side, to 'the feudalists, the leftist mini-groups, and the phony clerics' and on the other side, to the 'National Front, Israel, the Pahlavis and the Socialist International.' The last four were linked to the CIA."

The twenty-six day trial of Ghotbzadeh began in August 1982. In court he denied the accusations but confirmed the existence of a plot to topple the Islamic government and form a "real republic". His forced confessions, which were aired, are said to have come only after severe torture on the part of the police. Late on 15 September 1982, Ghotbzadeh was shot by a firing squad in Evin Prison. The Military Revolutionary Tribunal had sentenced him to death. He was 46.

=== Reactions ===
Abolhassan Banisadr, who had been in exile in Paris, stated that Ghotbzadeh's execution was "settling of accounts".

== Personal life ==
Ghotbzadeh never married. In 1987, Canadian journalist Carole Jerome published a book, The man in the mirror: A story of love, revolution and treachery in Iran, detailing both her romantic relationship with Ghotbzadeh and her journalistic account of the revolution.

He was fluent in French and English.

== Legacy ==
In his 1991 book, Inside the KGB: Myth and Reality, Vladimir Kuzichkin claimed that Ghotbzadeh had been an agent of the Soviet military intelligence service during his studies in the United States before later detaching himself from it. The book also alleged that the KGB had fabricated and placed a false CIA cable to an unnamed American agent in Iran in his residence, which was used as evidence to arrest and try him.

Ben Affleck's 2012 movie, Argo, used a real clip of Ghotbzadeh, showing him accusing Canada of "flagrantly violating international law." Ghotbzadeh's great-niece, Sanaz Ghajarrahimi, wrote and directed a play, named Red Wednesday, which was presented at the New Ohio Theatre in New York from 26 July to 3 August 2013. It was inspired by Ghotbzadeh's controversial life.

In 2017 Ali Sajjadi, a Persian journalist, based in Washington DC, published a collection of Sadegh Ghotbzadeh manuscripts. Sajjadi also interviewed many friends and colleagues of Ghotbzadeh for the book.

The BBC Persian documentary series, Son of the Revolution, premiered in February 2020. The series follows Ghotbzadeh's fascinating journey from a revolutionary in exile, to government minister and finally traitor in the eyes of the Islamic Republic. It was directed and produced by Farshad Bayan working with producer and researcher Mahmoud Azimaee. The project took over five years to complete. The three-part mini series uses archive footage and features many people who knew Ghotbzadeh or had interesting encounters with him to shed light on his character and relate stories about his activities both before and after the Iranian Revolution. The documentary was published on YouTube in Persian and with English subtitles.

Political offices
Preceded by Abolhassan Banisadr	Foreign minister of Iran; 1979-1980	Succeeded by Karim Khodapanahi
