= 1981 Iranian Prime Minister's office bombing =

Bombing and assassination of Iranian leaders

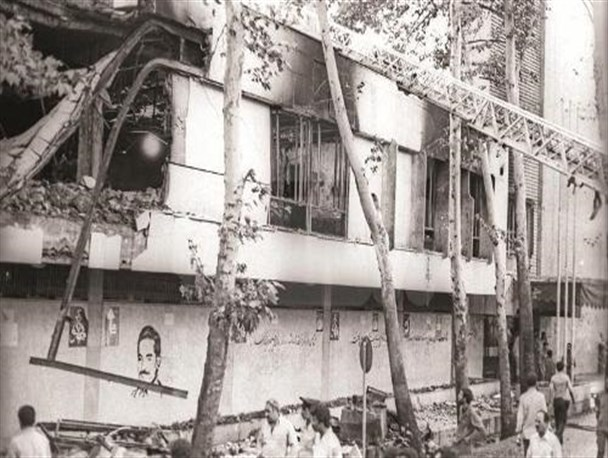
- The Iranian PM building after the explosion
- Location: Tehran, Iran
- Date: 30 August 1981; 15, 14:45 (+3:30)
- Target: Iranian officials
- Attack type: Bombing
- Deaths: 8
- Injuries: 23
- Assailant: Masoud Keshmiri (agent of MEK)

The office of Mohammad Javad Bahonar, Prime Minister of Iran, was bombed on 30 August 1981 killing Bahonar, President Mohammad-Ali Rajai, and six other Iranian government officials. The briefcase bombing came two months after the Hafte Tir bombing, which killed over seventy senior Iranian officials, including Chief Justice Mohammad Beheshti, then Iran's second-highest official.

According to sources, nobody "knew exactly who had been in the room at the time of the detonation." Eventually, there were three participants that had been unaccounted for, including Masoud Keshmiri, President Rajai, and Prime Minister Bahonar. It was later revealed that both Rajai and Bahonar had died in the explosion.

Ayatollah Khomeini charged the MEK with responsibility for the bombing, "however, there has been much speculation among academics and observers that these bombings may have actually been planned by senior Islamic Republican Party (IRP) leaders, including later Iranian President Ali Akbar Hashemi-Rafsanjani, to rid themselves of rivals within the IRP." Afterward, the interim presidential council announced five national days of mourning, and Iran's Parliament selected Ayatollah Mahdavi Kani as the next prime minister. Parliament held an election on 2 October 1981 to elect Bahonar's successor.

== Bombing ==
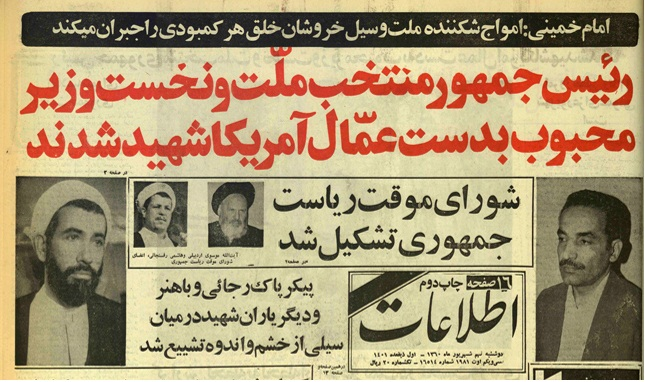
Front page of Ettela'at newspaper, reporting the blast

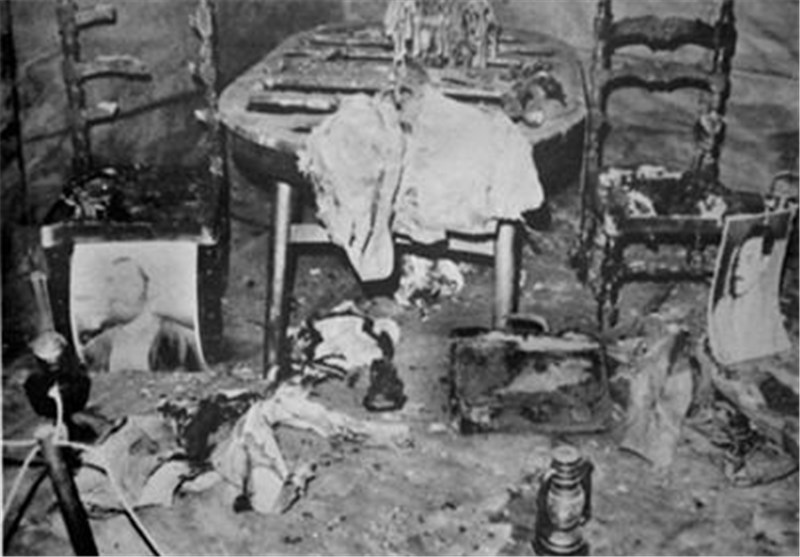
The Iranian Prime Minister's office after the 1981 explosion

On 30 August 1981 a bomb exploded in the office of Mohammad Javad Bahonar, Prime Minister of Iran, which killed Bahonar, President Mohammad Ali Rajai and some other officials.

The explosion destroyed the first floor. Due to their severe burns, the corpses were not easily identified. Rajai and Bahonar were identified through their teeth. They had won the election with 91 percent of the vote and had been in power for less than four weeks before the assassination. Their funeral was held the next day with nearly 500,000 attendees.

=== Prominent officials killed ===
- President Mohammad-Ali Rajai
- Prime Minister Mohammad-Javad Bahonar
- Col. Vahid Dastgerdi, chief of Iranian police
- Abdol Hossein Daftarian

== Suspects ==
Although no group claimed responsibility for the bombing, the Islamic Republic nevertheless attributed it to the People's Mujahedin of Iran (MEK). Also some Western observers believe the MEK could have been responsible, others note that "the explosions were set off by insiders – the first by an accomplice working in the offices of the IRP, the second by the guard in charge of security at Prime Minister Bahonar's headquarters." Mangol Bayat also expressed doubts that the MEK would be capable of the attacks "since infiltration of the regime at the very high level would have been necessary."

The Islamic Republic of Iran later claimed that the attack was carried out by MEK agent Masoud Keshmiri, secretary of Bahonar's office and of the Supreme National Security Council, who used a fake passport to escape Iran after the attack.

More than twenty suspects were identified in the subsequent investigation, including Masoud Keshmiri, Ali Akbar Tehrani, Mohammad Kazem Peiro Razawi, Khosro Ghanbari Tehrani, Javad Ghadiri, Mohsen Sazgara, Taghi Mohammadi, and Habibollah Dadashi.

== Aftermath ==
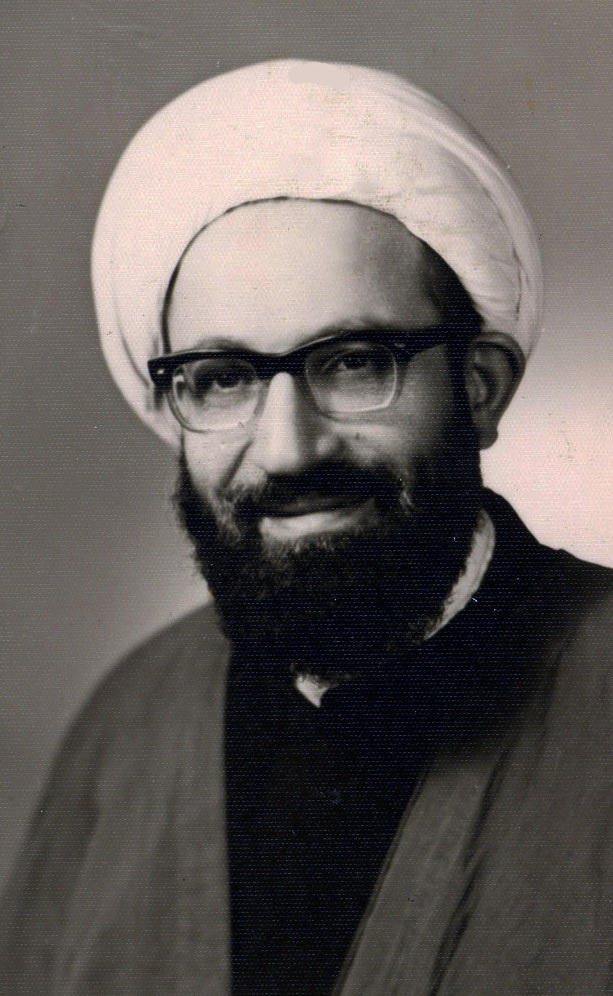
Mohammad-Reza Mahdavi Kani elected as prime minister by parliament in 1981

According to Iran's constitution, if the President was unable to perform his/her legal duties due to impeachment, resignation, absence, illness or death, the president's duties would be handed over to the Prime Minister. However, since Prime Minister Bahonar was assassinated along with president Rajai, Iran's parliament had to elect a new prime minister first. Parliament held an election on 2 October 1981, and elected Mohammad-Reza Mahdavi Kani as Bahonar's successor with 178 votes in favour, 10 votes against and 8 abstentions. Mahdavi Kani introduced a new cabinet; all the positions were similar to the cabinet of ‌Bahonar, the only changes being the Minister of the Interior and the Minister of Road Transport. Tehran radio also said that the Islamic Republic would "continue the firing squad executions of opponents blamed for assassinating the original inner circle of the Islamic leadership".

== See also ==
- Hafte Tir bombing
- 1994 Imam Reza shrine bomb explosion
- 2017 Tehran attacks
