= Hussein Kuli Khan Nawab =

Iranian politician (1864–1920)

- حسینقلی خان نواب
- Photograph by William Morgan Shuster

Minister of Foreign Affairs
- In office 1910–1911
- Preceded by: Javad Sad od-Dowleh
- Succeeded by: Nosrat-ed-Dowleh

Personal details
- Born: 1864 Qajar Iran
- Died: February 1946 (aged 82)
- Parent: Mirza Aqa Khan Nuri (father)

Hussein Kuli Khan Nawab (Persian: حسینقلی خان نواب) (1864 – February 1946), also known as Sadr es-Saltaneh, was a Persian foreign minister and ambassador. He was the seventh son of Mirza Aqa Khan Nuri, Prime Minister from 1851 to 1857 under Naser al-Din Shah Qajar.

In 1886 he was Consul General in Bombay and then became Envoy to Washington.

Between 1910 and 1911, Hussein Kuli Khan Nawab was Persian foreign minister. On October 16, 1910, the British government delivered an ultimatum to the Persian government to secure the Persian Gulf trade routes within three months, or else a 1,000- to 1,200-man police force under British-Indian leadership would intervene there, financed by a ten percent increase in import duties in Persian ports and Fars province. He responded on this threat to restrict the Persian sovereignty by politely pointing out that despite the alleged insecurity of trade routes, the volume of imports into Persia had increased by ten percent in the previous year. The operation led to the creation of the Persian Gendarmerie.

As a strong supporter of the Persian Constitutional Revolution Hussein Kuli Khan Nawab is praised by Morgan Shuster, treasurer-general of Persia at the time.

As of 1915, Hussein Kuli Khan Nawab was envoy to Frederick Augustus III of Saxony.

He was appointed an Honorary Companion of the British Order of the Bath (CB) on 13 February 1903.
