= Fereydun Sahabi =

Iranian academic

Fereydun Sahabi فریدون سحابی
- Born: 1937 (age 88–89); Iran
- Occupations: professor, writer, translator, political activist and the first president of the Atomic Energy Organization of Iran

Fereydun Sahabi (Persian: فریدون سحابی; born 1937 in Tehran, Iran) is an Iranian academic, writer, translator, and social activist. He was the first president of the Atomic Energy Organization of Iran and the second in the administration of President of Iran after the Iranian revolution.

== Early life ==
He was the third son of Yadollah Sahabi and the brother of Ezzatollah Sahabi. Fereydun Sahabi was born in Iran in 1937. He did an MPhil in geology and exploration of petroleum from the University of London.

== Career ==
After returning to Iran, he worked as a professor at the University of Tehran.

=== Political activities ===
Sahabi was a member of the National Front at the University of Tehran. He was active in the European Student Confederation. He was elected as a member of the Freedom Movement of Iran in 1979. After the Iranian Revolution, he was elected as the Undersecretary of the Ministry of Energy and the first president of the Atomic Energy Organization of Iran.

== Books ==
- Geology of petroleum, University of Tehran Press, 2012
- Sedimentary petrology, University of Tehran Press, 2008
