= Ezzatollah Sahabi =

Iranian activist (1930–2011)

- عزت‌الله سحابی
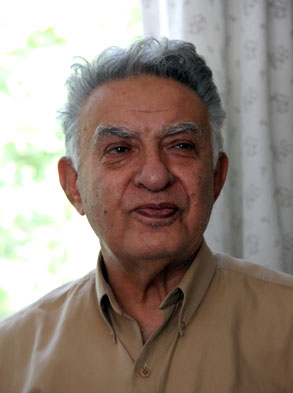

Member of Parliament of Iran
- In office 28 May 1980 – 28 May 1984
- Constituency: Tehran, Rey and Shemiranat
- Majority: 1,070,929 (50.2%)

Minister without Portfolio for Plan and Budget
- In office 29 September 1979 – 6 November 1979
- Prime Minister: Mehdi Bazargan
- Preceded by: Ali Akbar Moinfar

Member of Assembly of Experts for Constitution
- In office 15 August 1979 – 15 November 1979
- Constituency: Tehran province
- Majority: 1,442,217 (57.1%)

Personal details
- Born: 9 May 1930 Tehran, Iran
- Died: 31 May 2011 (aged 81) Tehran, Iran
- Party: Council of Nationalist-Religious Activists (2000–2011); Freedom Movement (1961–1980)
- Children: Haleh Sahabi
- Parent: Yadollah Sahabi (father)

Ezzatollah Sahabi (Persian: عزت‌الله سحابی, 9 May 1930 – 31 May 2011) was an Iranian politician and journalist. He was a parliament member from 1980 to 1984.

== Early life ==
Sahabi was born on 9 May 1930 in Tehran, Iran. His father, Yadollah Sahabi, was an influential figure in the 1979 Iranian revolution. His brother, Fereydun Sahabi, was the first president of the Atomic Energy Organization of Iran and the second in the administration of President of Iran.

He studied mechanical engineering at the Faculty of Engineering Tehran University.

== Political career ==
He was appointed as a member of Council of Islamic Revolution by Ruhollah Khomeini on 12 February 1979. Mehdi Bazargan, then Prime Minister of Iran, named Sahabi as Head of National Budget Center. He was elected as a member of Parliament in election of 1980.

In later years Sahabi was managing editor of the journal Iran-e Farda (The Iran of Tomorrow), which was banned by the Islamic government, and participated in the 2000 'Iran After the Elections' Conference held in Berlin, for which he was sentenced to four and a half years imprisonment. He was well known as the leader of the Iran's Nationalist-Religious political alliance.

Sahabi spent a total of 15 years in prison both before and after the 1979 Islamic revolution.

== Personal life ==
Sahabi was married to Zarrindokht Ataei, whose maternal uncle was Mehdi Bazargan. They had a son and a daughter. In April 2011, he was hospitalized in Persian Hospital. On 1 May 2011, Sahabi went into a coma after a stroke. On 31 May 2011, he died at age 81 in Modarres Hospital and his funeral was held the next day.

== Funeral ==
Sahabi's funeral was reportedly marred by the removal of his body by plain clothes authorities, the death of his daughter, Haleh Sahabi, from cardiac arrest after being beaten by the plain clothes for holding a photograph of her father. Also the plain clothes heated and arrest of several mourners. According to an unnamed journalist present at the funeral, a "large group" of plainclothes and security forces present at the ceremony "beat a number of mourners", including Haleh Sahabi. Haleh Sahabi reportedly collapsed after trying to stop authorities from removing her father's body. According to Haleh's uncle, the woman died due to "the beating given to her, (which) were severe". However, her son Shamekhi was forced to collaborate with the government by stating that his mother died "not due to beatings but because of a cardiac arrest". Mourners reportedly arrested at the funeral include Habibollah Peyman, a member of the Freedom Movement of Iran, political activist Hamid Ahrari, and Hamed Montazeri, the grandson of the late dissident cleric Grand Ayatollah Hossein Ali Montazeri. Fars news agency denied there had been any clash with police and accused the opposition movement of seeking to politicise the incident.

== See also ==
- Intellectual movements in Iran
- Haleh Sahabi
- Hoda Saber
- Yadollah Sahabi
- Fereydun Sahabi
