= Mirza Hosein Khan Sepahsalar =

Prime Minister of Iran (1828–1881)

Mirza Hosein Khan Sepahsalar Moshir od-Dowleh
- میرزا حسین‌خان سپهسالار
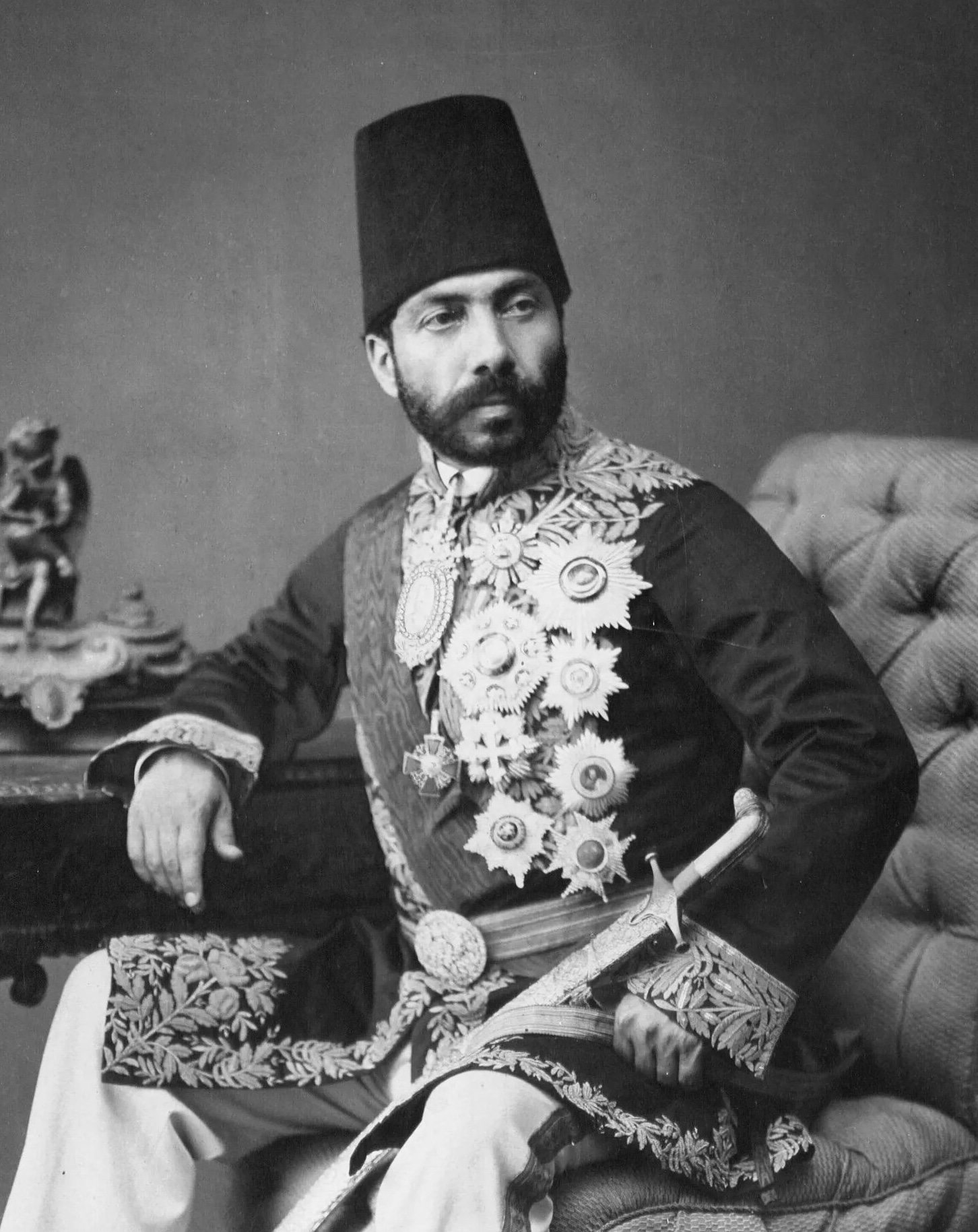
- Studio photograph of Mirza Hosein Khan Moshir od-Dowleh, c. 1870

Grand Vizier of Persia
- In office 12 November 1871 – September 1873
- Monarch: Naser al-Din Shah Qajar
- Preceded by: Mirza Yusuf Ashtiani
- Succeeded by: Mirza Yusuf Ashtiani

Minister of War
- In office 1871–1873
- Monarch: Naser al-Din Shah Qajar
- Preceded by: Firuz Mirza
- Succeeded by: Firuz Mirza

Minister of Foreign Affairs
- In office 11 December 1873 – 1880 (Note: Minister of Foreign Affairs (Iran)#List of ministers)
- Monarch: Naser al-Din Shah Qajar
- Preceded by: Mirza Saeed Khan Ansari
- Succeeded by: Mirza Saeed Khan Ansari

Personal details
- Born: 1828 Qazvin, Sublime State of Iran
- Died: 1881 (aged 52–53) Mashhad, Sublime State of Iran
- Party: Independent

Mirza Hosein Khan Moshir od-Dowleh Sepahsalar (Persian: میرزا حسین‌خان مشیرالدوله سپهسالار) or simply Mirza Hosein Sepahsalar (Persian: میرزا حسین سپهسالار) (1828–1881) was the Grand Vizier (prime minister) of Iran (Persia) during the Qajar era under Naser al-Din Shah Qajar between 1871 and 1873.

After a successful career in the Iranian foreign service, serving in Tiflis, Hosein Khan was made ambassador to Constantinople during the great Ottoman reform period after 1856. He seems also to have been influenced by at least two reformist thinkers: Fatali Akhundov, whom he got to know well in Tiflis, and Mirza Malkam Khan, whom he met in Constantinople.

On becoming Grand vizier, Hosein Khan persuaded the Shah to grant a concession for railroad construction—the Reuter concession—and other commercial development projects to Baron de Reuter. Opposition from bureaucratic factions and clerical leaders, however, forced the Shah to dismiss his Grand Vizier and cancel the concession.

== Biography ==
Mirza Hossein was born at 1828 in Qazvin. His father was a friend of Amir Kabir, through whose patronage Hossein Khan was appointed to government service and sent abroad, where he studied French and Arabic languages.

In 1848, he was appointed consul in Bombay. During his tenure there, he noted in a report to the Iranian government the advantages of opium cultivation from an export perspective, and, on the basis of this report, the government ordered the cultivation of opium. After a three-year mission in Bombay, he returned home with a considerable fortune of 150,000 rupees, which gave rise to accusations of corruption.

== Reform ideas ==
In 1856, he was appointed ambassador to the Ottoman Empire. His tenure in Constantinople coincided with the period of the Tanzimat, particularly with the drafting of the first Ottoman constitution of 1863. He subsequently came under the influence of the progressive ideas of the secret society Young Ottomans.

In 1870, he accompanied Naser al-Din Shah Qajar on a visit to the Ottoman Empire, during which he discussed the reforms of Midhat Pasha with the Shah. Following this visit, in 1871, Hossein Khan was appointed vizier.

== Vizeriate ==
While serving as Grand Vizier, Hoseyn Khan initiated measures to reform Iran's legislative and judicial systems, as well as to reorganize the Shah’s army. His reforms included: limiting the power of provincial governors, safeguarding the civil rights of subjects, establishing an Austro-Hungarian military mission in Persia, reorganizing the judiciary, and founding a national postal system.

However, his successful reforms, he made a number of mistakes. One of these was granting a concession to the entrepreneur Paul Reuter in 1872, placing all of Iran's existing and future infrastructure and industry under his control. The Reuter Concession was immediately condemned by all segments of Persian society—businessmen, the clergy, and nationalists—and was quickly revoked. His Vizeriate also saw the spread of opium cultivation and decline in cotton production, which were among the causes of the ensuing economic crisis and famine.

== See also ==
- Amir Kabir
- List of prime ministers of Iran
- Prime Minister of Iran
- Sepahsalar Mosque

== Sources ==
- Bamdad, Mehdi (1968). Biography of Iran's Political Figures in 12th, 13th and 14th Hijri Centuries (known as Sharh-e Haal-e Rejaal-e Iran).
- Cole, Juan R. I. (1998). Modernity and the Millennium: The Genesis of the Bahá'í Faith in the Nineteenth-Century Middle East. Columbia University Press. p. 27. ISBN 978-0-231-11081-5.
- Lambton, Ann K. S. (1987). Qajar Persia. University of Texas Press. ISBN 978-1-85043-041-4.

== Literature ==
- Avery, Peter (1991). The Cambridge History of Iran 7. Cambridge University Press. ISBN 9780521200950
- Daniel, Elton L. (2001). The History of Iran. ISBN 9798216972686
