= Yadollah Sahabi =

Iranian politician (1905–2002)

- یدالله سحابی
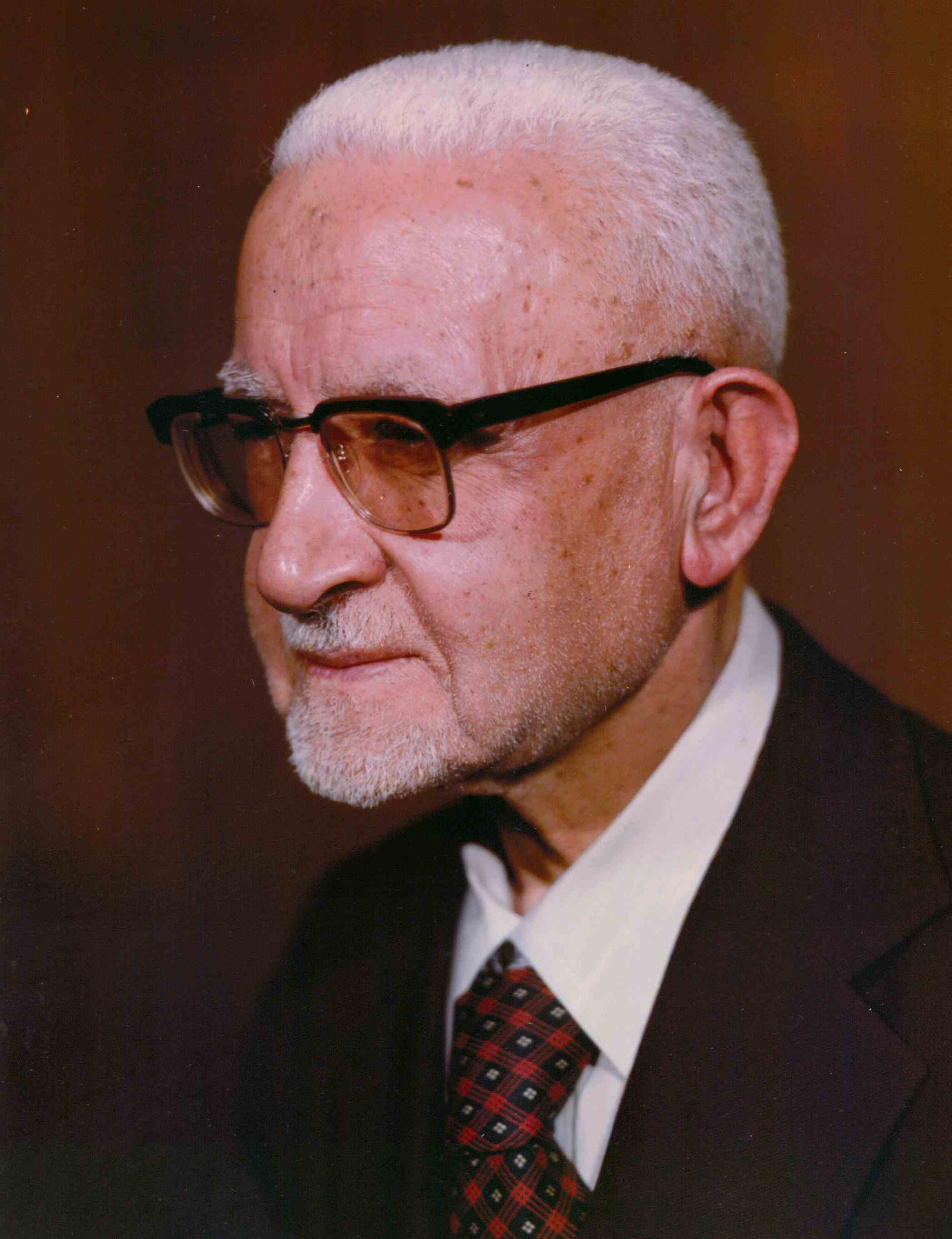

Member of Parliament of Iran
- In office 28 May 1980 – 28 May 1984
- Constituency: Tehran, Rey and Shemiranat
- Majority: 817,869 (50.1%)

Minister without Portfolio for Revolutionary Projects
- In office 18 February 1979 – 6 November 1979
- Prime Minister: Mehdi Bazargan

Personal details
- Born: 25 February 1905 Tehran, Sublime State of Iran
- Died: 12 April 2002 (aged 97) Tehran, Iran
- Party: Freedom Movement

Yadollah Sahabi (Persian: یدالله سحابی; 25 February 1905 – 12 April 2002) was a prominent Iranian scholar, writer, reformist and politician. A close associate of Mohammad Mosaddegh and Mehdi Bazargan, Sahabi was an active campaigner for the nationalization of the Iranian oil industry in the 1950s. He was the father of Ezzatollah Sahabi and Fereydun Sahabi.

Sahabi studied at Université Lille Nord de France and majored in Geology. He got his Ph.D. degree in 1936 and was immediately hired by Tehran University, faculty of science. Sahabi was one of the founders of the Freedom Movement of Iran. He was an advocate of pluralism nationalization He was a full professor at Tehran University and well-credited writer.

Sahabi is considered by many Iranians a national hero and an Iranian treasure. He died at the age of 97 in Jam Hospital in Tehran.

== See also ==
- Ezzatollah Sahabi
- Fereydun Sahabi

Honorary titles
| Unknown | Aging Speaker of the Parliament of Iran; 1st term | Succeeded by Saeed Amani |
