= Mohammad-Javad Bahonar =

Iranian Islamic cleric and politician (1933–1981)

- محمدجواد باهنر
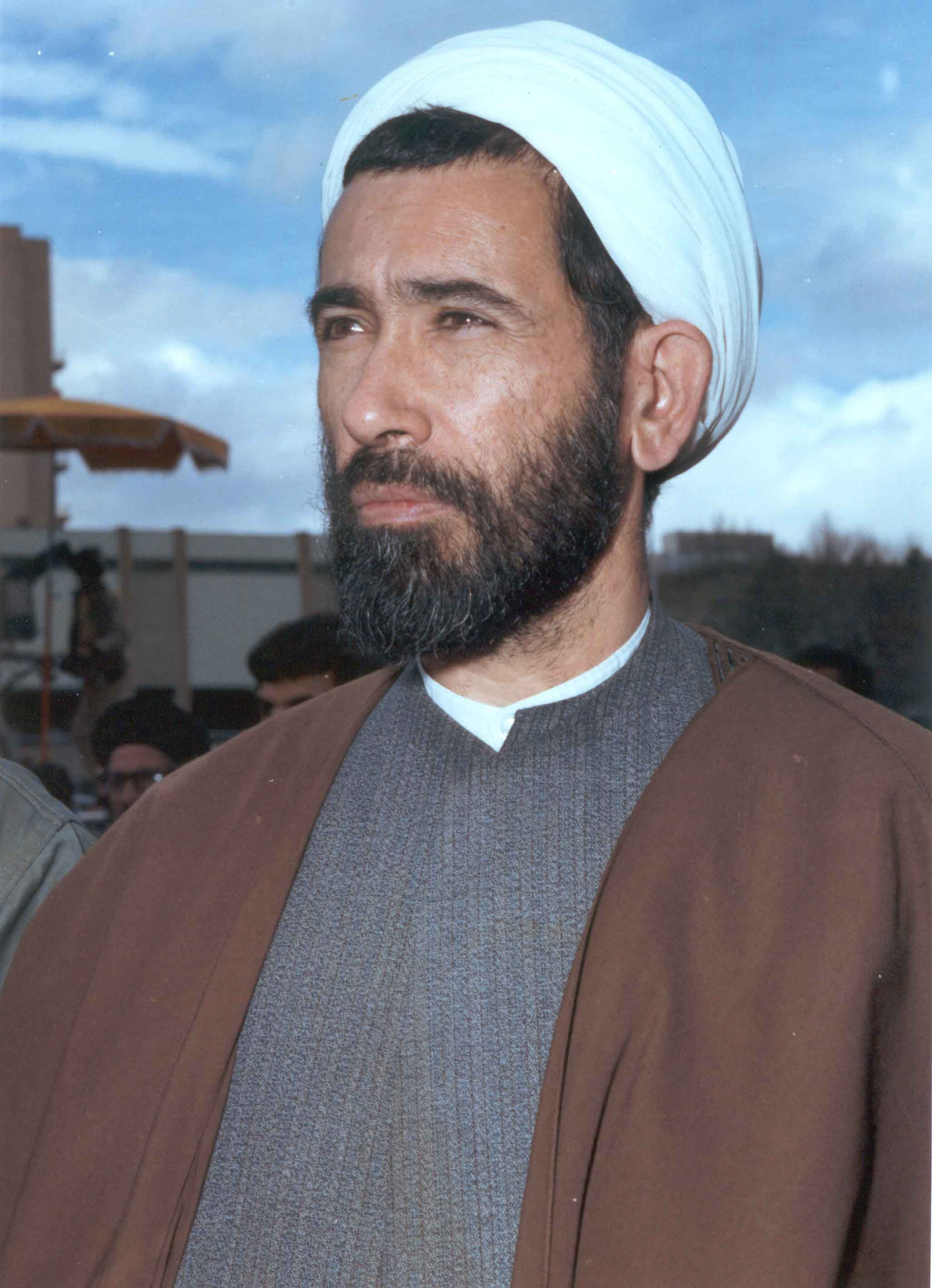
- Bahonar in the 1970's

43rd Prime Minister of Iran
- In office 4 August 1981 – 30 August 1981
- Supreme Leader: Ruhollah Khomeini
- President: Mohammad-Ali Rajai
- Preceded by: Mohammad-Ali Rajai
- Succeeded by: Reza Mahdavi Kani (Acting)

Minister of Education
- In office 10 August 1980 – 10 August 1981
- President: Abolhassan Banisadr
- Prime Minister: Mohammad-Ali Rajai
- Preceded by: Mohammad-Ali Rajai
- Succeeded by: Ali Akbar Parvaresh

Member of the Parliament of Iran
- In office 28 May 1980 – 10 August 1980
- Constituency: Tehran, Rey, Shemiranat and Eslamshahr
- Majority: 1,385,197 (64.8%)

Member of Assembly of Experts for Constitution
- In office 15 August 1979 – 15 November 1979
- Constituency: Kerman province
- Majority: 205,765 (80.2%)

Personal details
- Born: 5 September 1933 Kerman, Imperial State of Iran
- Died: 30 August 1981 (aged 47) Tehran, Iran
- Resting place: Hafte Tir Mausoleum
- Party: Islamic Republican Party
- Spouse: Zahra Eynakian (m. 1966)
- Children: 4
- Relatives: Mohammad-Reza Bahonar (brother)
- Education: University of Tehran

Mohammad-Javad Bahonar (Persian: محمدجواد باهنر, 5 September 1933 – 30 August 1981) was an Iranian theologian and politician who served as the Prime Minister of Iran for less than one month, in August 1981. On 30 August, Bahonar and other members of Mohammad-Ali Rajai's government were assassinated by Mujahideen-e Khalq.

== Early life ==
Mohammad Javad Bahonar was born on 3 September 1933 in Kerman, Iran. His father was a simple tradesman and had a little shop in the city of Kerman. He was the second child of nine in a very poor family. As a child, he was taught the Quran at the local Makk-tab-Khaneh (parochial school attended by the students very often at the house of local mullah before national school system was put in place) also learning to read and write in Persian. Guided by the Ayatollah Haghighi, he studied at the Masoumieh seminary. At the same time he could obtain the degree of fifth of ancient school.

== Education ==
Bahonar passed his primary school at Masoumieh School of Kerman. In 1953, he went to Qom Seminary and attended in the class of Ruhollah Khomeini, the leader of Iranian revolution. He received a PhD in theology from the University of Tehran. Also, he was faculty member of the Tehran University and taught theology.

== Revolutionary activities ==
=== Before Iranian revolution ===
Bahonar was a reviler of the Pahlavi dynasty and had activities against Mohammad Reza Shah that led to his imprisonment in 1963, 1964, and 1975. On 1963, he was jailed for opposing the Shah's White Revolution. Also, during the time of Khomeini's exile to Iraq and France, he continued his revolutionary activities and was an influential member among Khomeini's followers. Bahonar along with Morteza Motahari was active speaker of Hosseiniyeh Ershad, a religious lecture hall in the Tehran.

=== After Iranian revolution ===
Upon release from custody, Bahonar did not engage in further activism until Khomeini became Iran's de facto ruler. For his service in the revolution, Bahonar became the new government's minister of culture and Islamic guidance in 1981, and was responsible for censoring any media disapproved by Muslim leaders in Tehran. He also directed a purge of all secular influence from Iranian universities.

He became a founding member of the Islamic Republican party and an original member of the Council of Revolution of Iran. He was also a member of the Assembly of Experts. Bahonar along with Mohammad Ali Rajai purged Iranian universities of western cultural influences in what is known as the Islamic Cultural Revolution. After the assassination of Mohammad Beheshti on 28 June 1981, he was appointed general secretary of the party where he was also a member of the central committee. Bahonar served as the minister of culture and Islamic guidance under Mohammad Ali Rajai's prime ministry from March 1981 to August 1981. When Rajai became president on 5 August 1981, he chose Bahonar as his prime minister.

== Assassination ==
Bahonar was assassinated along with Rajai and other members of the Islamic Republican Party when a bomb exploded at the party's office in Tehran on 30 August 1981. In Iran, this explosion is known as the Hashteh-Shahrivar bombing. The bomb was set off when one of the victims opened a briefcase. The briefcase was carried by Massoud Keshmiri, a security official at the Islamic Republican Party, to the meeting. One week later, Keshmiri was announced as responsible for planning and executing the assassination. Keshmiri was identified as an operative of Mujahedin that was supported by Saddam Hussein. He tried to assassinate Rajai and Bahonar on 22 August when Rajai introduced his cabinet to Ruhollah Khomeini. Ahmad Khomeini explained that Keshmiri was with Rajai when they came to see Imam Khomeini. He had a suitcase but they did not allow him to bring it. Bahonar died at the age of 47.

Iranian authorities announced that Massoud Keshmiri, "a close aide to the late President Muhammad Ali Rajai and secretary of the Supreme Security Council, had been responsible." Keshmiri, an MEK member who was thought to have died in the explosion, "was accorded a martyr's funeral" and was "buried alongside Rajai and Bahonar." Various MEK supporters were arrested and executed in reprisal, but Kashmiri apparently slipped through the dragnet. The reaction to both bombings was intense with many arrests and executions of MEK and other leftist groups.

== See also ==
- Mohammad-Reza Bahonar, his brother
- Mohammad Beheshti

== Sources ==
- Moin, Baqer (2001). Khomeini: Life of the Ayatollah. I. B. Tauris. ISBN 978-1-84511-790-0.

Political offices
Preceded by Mohammad-Ali Rajai	Minister of Education; 1980–1981	Succeeded by Ali Akbar Parvaresh
Preceded by Mohammad Ali Rajai	Prime Minister of Iran; 1981	Succeeded by Mohammad Reza Mahdavi Kani
Party political offices
Preceded by Mohammad Beheshti	Secretary-General of the Islamic Republican Party; 1981	Succeeded by Ali Khamenei
