= Hadi Manafi =

Iranian politician and physician

- هادی منافی
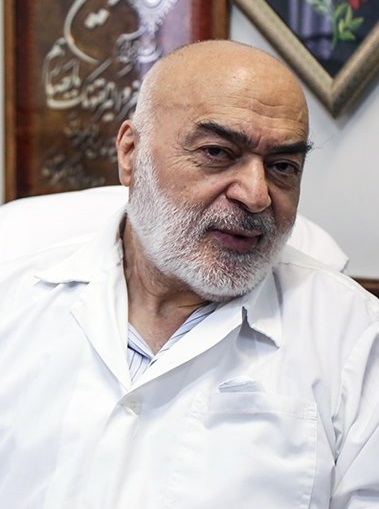

Vice President of Iran Head of Department of Environment
- In office 10 March 1985 – 23 August 1997
- President: Ali Khamenei Akbar Hashemi Rafsanjani
- Preceded by: Reza-Hossein Mirza-Taheri
- Succeeded by: Masoumeh Ebtekar

Minister of Health and Medical Education
- In office 10 September 1980 – 14 August 1984
- President: Abolhassan Banisadr Ali Khamenei Akbar Hashemi Rafsanjani
- Preceded by: Moussa Zargar
- Succeeded by: Alireza Marandi

Personal details
- Born: 1941 (age 84–85) Tabriz, Iran

Hadi Manafi (Persian: هادی منافی; born 1941) is an Iranian politician, physician, and general surgeon. He was assigned as the third minister of health of Iran from 1980-1984.
