= Mirza Abolhassan Khan Ilchi =

Iranian Minister of Foreign Affairs and ambassador (1776–1845)

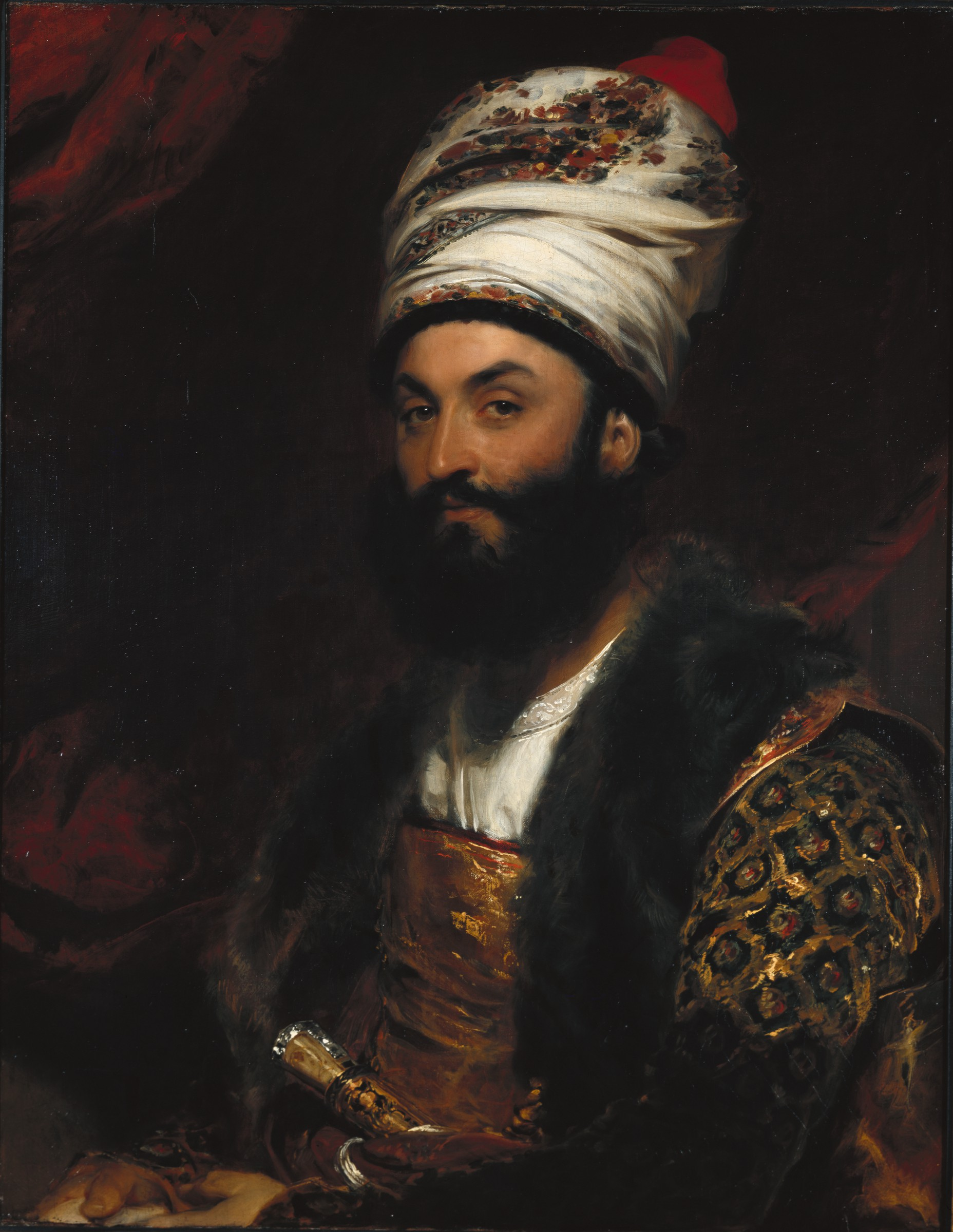
- Portrait of Mirza Abul Hasan by Sir Thomas Lawrence, 1810

Minister of Foreign Affairs
- In office 1823–1834
- Monarch: Fath-Ali Shah Qajar
- Preceded by: Neshat Esfahani
- Succeeded by: Mirza Ali Farahani
- In office 1838–1845
- Monarch: Mohammad Shah Qajar
- Preceded by: Mirza Masoud Ansari Garmrudi
- Succeeded by: Mirza Masoud Ansari Garmrudi

Personal details
- Born: 1776 Shiraz, Zand Iran
- Died: 1845 (aged 68–69) Qajar Iran
- Spouse: Delaram
- Parent: Mirza Mohammad-Ali (father)
- Relatives: Hajji Ebrahim Shirazi (uncle); Ali Akbar Qavam ol-Molk (cousin); Mirza Mohammad-Ali Khan Shirazi (nephew)

Mirza Abolhassan Khan Ilchi (Persian: میرزا ابوالحسن خان ایلچی; 1776 – 1845) also called Abolhassan Khan Shirazi Ilchi Kabir or Abu'l Hassan Khan was an Iranian politician and diplomat who served as the Minister of Foreign Affairs twice, first from 1824 to 1834, and then again from 1838 until his death in 1845. He also served as the ambassador to Russia and Britain, and was the main Iranian delegate at the signing of the Golestan and Turkmenchay treaties with Russia in 1813 and 1828 respectively.

Born in Shiraz, Mirza Abolhassan was the nephew of Hajji Ebrahim Shirazi, the minister of the two Qajar shahs (kings) of Iran, Agha Mohammad Khan Qajar (r. 1789–1797) and Fath-Ali Shah Qajar (r. 1797–1834). When Hajji Ebrahim Shirazi fell out of favor and was executed in 1801, all of his relatives either escaped, were executed, or were blinded. Mirza Abolhassan, who held the governorship of Shushtar at the time, fled to India, where he served in the court of the Nizam of Hyderabad. He was granted a royal amnesty after two and a half years, at which point he went back to Iran and entered Fath-Ali Shah's court.

Between 1809 and 1810, Mirza Abolhassan served as the Iranian ambassador to Britain, finalizing the "Preliminary Treaty of Friendship and Alliance" between the two countries, and also unsuccessfully tried to receive British assistance in getting Russia to hand over the occupied Iranian territories in the Caucasus to Iran. He documented his journey in the Hayratnameh ("Book of Wonder"). During his stay, the British East India Company started paying him a salary of 1,000 rupees per year, which they continued to do until his death. In March 1813, Mirza Abolhassan signed the Treaty of Golestan on behalf of Iran, thus concluding the Russo-Iranian War of 1804–1813 and leading to the loss of most of the Iranian holdings in the Caucasus. Following the treaty, Mirza Abolhassan served as the Iranian ambassador to Russia between 1814 and 1816 to discuss the recovery of some of the lost territory, which failed.

In 1823, he was made the new Minister of Foreign Affairs. He kept this position and participated in the majority of significant Iranian foreign policy decisions until Fath-Ali Shah's death in 1834. Mirza Abolhassan was part of the faction that opposed another war with Russia, fearing the capability of the Russian Empire and wanted armed conflict to be avoided at all costs. However, they were outmanoeuvred by the faction that advocated for war, leading to the second Russo-Iranian War in 1826. The Iranians eventually lost the second war with the Russians, and were thus forced to sign the Treaty of Turkmenchay on 28 February 1828, in which they agreed to cede Erivan and Nakhichevan. It was Mirza Abolhassan and the crown prince Abbas Mirza who signed the treaty on behalf of Iran.

Following Fath-Ali Shah's death in 1834, Mirza Abolhassan supported the prince Ali Shah Mirza as his successor, since the other prince Mohammad Shah Qajar had appointed Abol-Qasem Qa'em-Maqam as his minister. Mohammad Shah eventually defeated Ali Shah and entered Tehran, which led Mirza Abolhassan to seek refuge in the Shah Abdol-Azim Shrine in February 1835. There he stayed until 26 June 1835, when the now disgraced Abol-Qasem Qa'em-Maqam was executed. The latter was succeeded by Haji Mirza Aqasi, who restored Mirza Abolhassan as the Minister of Foreign Affairs in 1838, which he held until his death in 1845. Mirza Abolhassan is viewed in a positive light by the majority of contemporary British travelers. However, the majority of Iranian academics' assessments of his personality are negative.

== Background ==
Mirza Abolhassan was born in 1776 in the southern city of Shiraz. He was the second son of Mirza Mohammad-Ali, who had served as a scribe under the Afsharid shah (king) of Iran, Nader Shah (r. 1736–1747). His mother was a sister of Hajji Ebrahim Shirazi, the minister of the two Qajar shahs of Iran, Agha Mohammad Khan Qajar (r. 1789–1797) and Fath-Ali Shah Qajar (r. 1797–1834). Before his service under the Qajars, Hajji Ebrahim Shirazi had served under the Zand dynasty (1751–1794), in whose court Mirza Abolhassan had received his early education.

When Hajji Ebrahim Shirazi fell out of favor and was executed in 1801, all of his relatives either escaped, were executed, or were blinded. Mirza Abolhassan, who held the governorship of Shushtar at the time, was exiled to Shiraz. He left for Basra out of fear for his life, traveled to India from there, and subsequently enrolled in the Nizam of Hyderabad's court. He was granted a royal amnesty after two and a half years, at which point he went back to Iran. He entered Fath-Ali Shah's court with the assistance of his wife's powerful relative Hajji Mohammad Hossein Isfahani, and amassed a substantial fortune.

== Career ==
=== Eruption of war between Iran and Russia ===
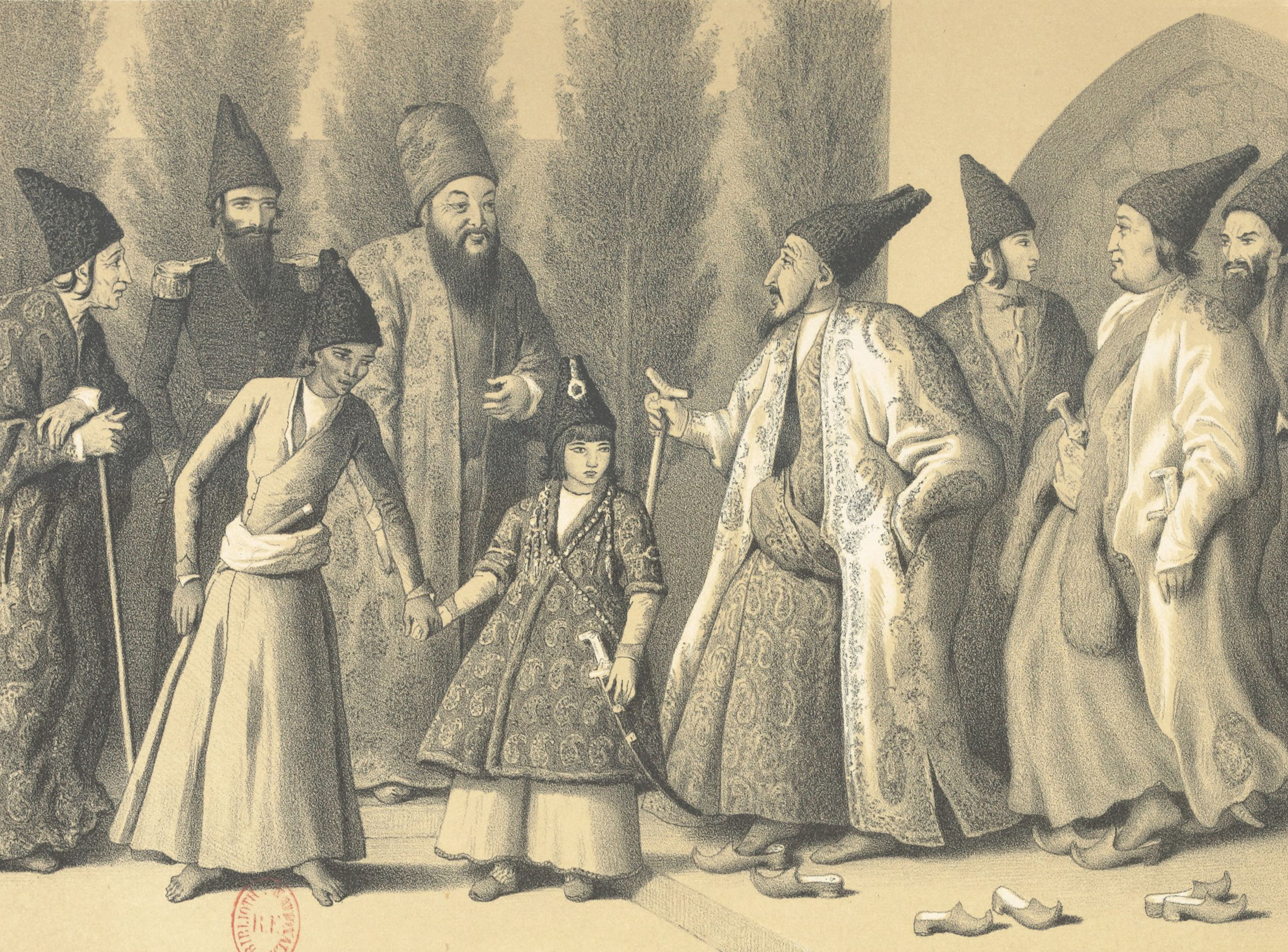
Abbas Mirza Molk-Ara Nayeb-al-saltana in his childhood with his tutor, Reza-Qoli Khan Hedayat, Haji Mirza Aqasi, the grand vizier and Mirza Abolhassan Khan Ilchi; by Alexey Saltykov; Published in 1850

In 1804, a war erupted between Iran and Russia, when the Russian Empire seized the city of Ganja, which had been governed by the Ganja Khanate of Iran. Mirza Abolhassan was given the title of ilchi ("envoy") after his first expedition, which was to the court of the British king George III (r. 1760–1820). During this period, the focus of the major powers' interest in the East had shifted to Iran as a result of Napoleon's preparations to march to India. Fath-Ali Shah wanted to reclaim Georgia from the Russians with the help of Napoleon, who had made a pact of friendship with Iran in the Finckenstein Palace in 1807. Fath-Ali Shah, however, switched to the British when Napoleon made peace with the Russians at Tilsit in the same year.

The British were driven by worries about Napoleon attacking India, while the Iranians were worried that the French would abandon them despite the Treaty of Finckenstein. This culminated in Iran and Britain agreeing to the "Preliminary Treaty of Friendship and Alliance" in 1809. Mirza Abolhassan was sent as the Iranian ambassador to London to wrap up the treaty. It is uncertain why he was assigned to the task. According to the British ambassador to Iran, Harford Jones-Brydges, it was him who had insisted that Mirza Abolhassan get assigned to the task, since the latter had become somewhat familiar with British etiquette and customs during his stay in India. Meanwhile some 20th-century sources assert that Mirza Abolhassan was hired because of his relationships with important courtiers, or they assert, citing British reports, that no one desired to work at the court of an "infidel". According to the Iranian-American historian George Bournoutian, Mirza Abolhassan was given the assignment due to his familial ties.

=== Mission to Britain ===
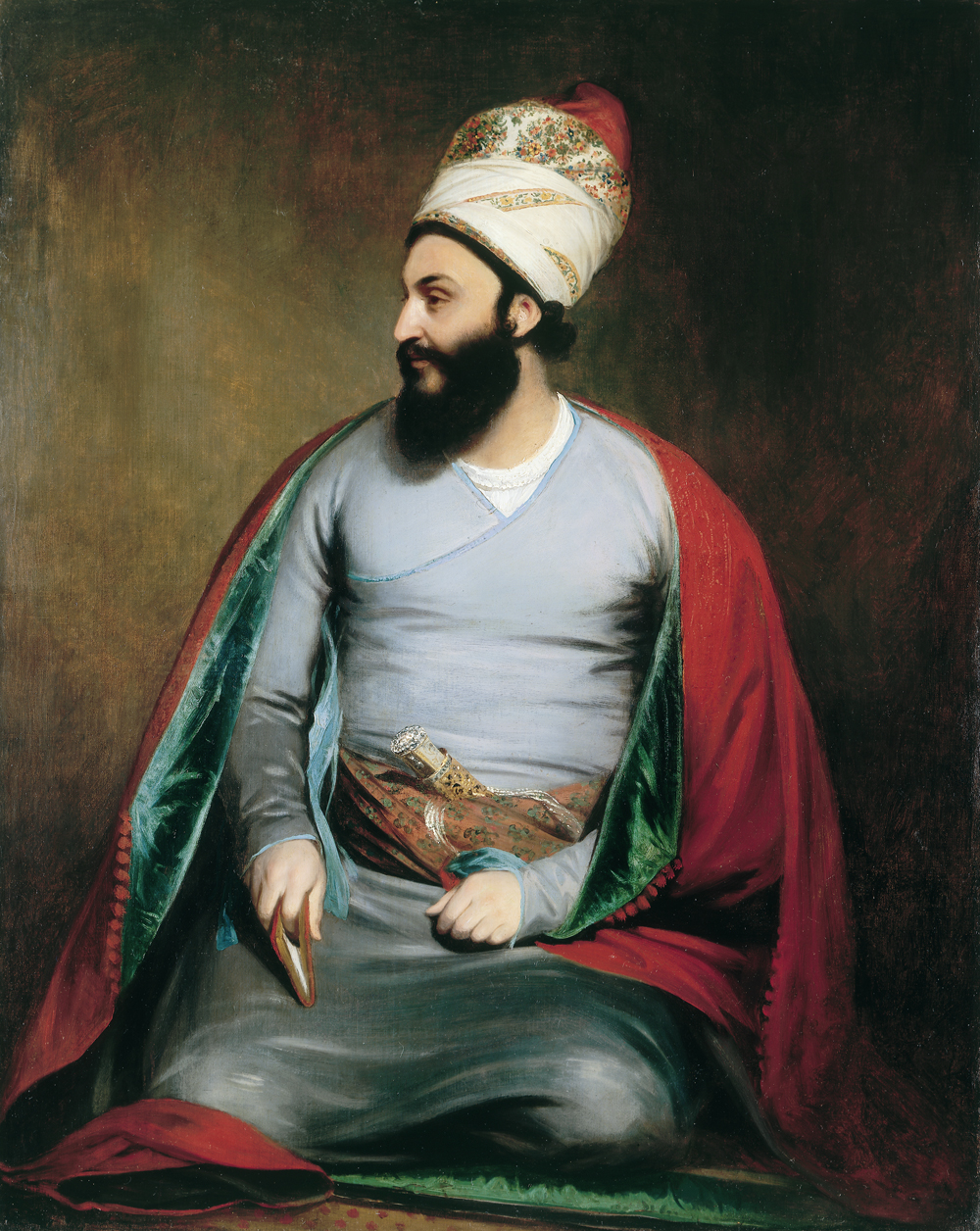
c. 1810 portrait of Mirza Abolhassan by Sir William Beechey

On May 7, 1809, Mirza Abolhassan set out from Tehran with Harford Jones-Brydges and James Justinian Morier, who was serving as the mission's secretary at the time. They arrived in Plymouth on November 25, 1809. A thorough and frequently sarcastic description of the trip was provided by Morier in A Journey Through Persia, Armenia and Asia Minor to Constantinople, in the years 1808 and 1809. Morier later based several occurrences of his Adventures of Hajji Baba of Ispahan on the events of this journey. Brydges provides another report in An Account of His Majesty's Mission to the Court of Persia, in the years 1807-1811.

The well-known orientalist Gore Ouseley was chosen to be Mirza Abolhassan's host while he was in London, and they grew close over time. The goal of Mirza Abolhassan's mission was to enlist England's assistance in getting Russia to hand over the occupied Iranian territories in the Caucasus to Iran. However, according to a letter Mirza Abolhassan wrote to Richard Wellesley in December 1810, none of the Iranians' goals were achieved. During his stay, Mirza Abolhassan started learning English and eventually picked up conversational skills. Two letters he wrote to an unnamed English nobleman and published in The Morning Star on May 29, 1810, demonstrate his improvement.

Mirza Abolhassan drew the attention of the high society during his time in London, and newspapers and private letters as far away as the United States covered every move and word he made. At this time, the British East India Company started paying him a salary of 1,000 rupees per year, which they continued to do until his death. Later historians regarded this as evidence of his betrayal, or at the minimum, that he was a strong advocate for the British. The Iranian historian Naghmeh Sohrabi, however, opposes this viewpoint: "it is important to keep in mind that fidelity to the state had different meanings in the context of early nineteenth-century Iran. The money given to Ilchi was public knowledge in the Qajar court, and there is no evidence that it brought under question Ilchi's loyalty to Fath 'Ali Shah at any point." Another Iranian historian, Hasan Javadi, notes that "Receiving gifts was not uncommon among the courtiers of Fath-'Ali Shah, but a regular annuity from a foreign government was unusual."

On July 16, 1810, Mirza Abolhassan left Portsmouth for Iran with Morier and Ouseley, who was the new British envoy to Iran. Their ship was driven to South America by a violent storm, and they eventually arrived at Bushehr on 1 March 1811. The first Iranians to travel to South America were likely Mirza Abolhassan and his retinue of eight servants.

=== Peace negotiations with Russia ===
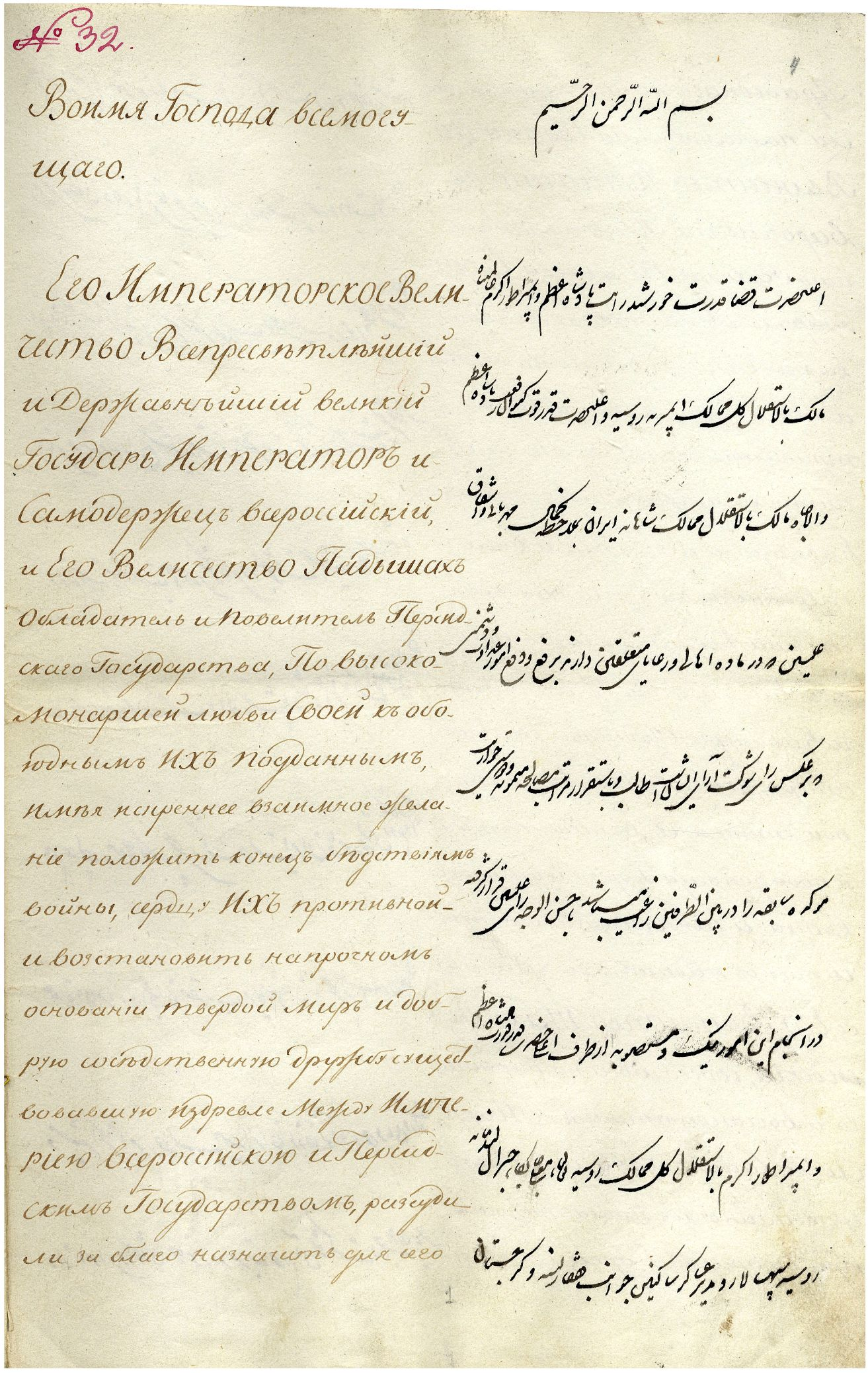
A page of the Treaty of Golestan

Fath-Ali Shah gave Mirza Abolhassan the honorific title of "Khan" after he returned to Iran. Due to British pressure and promises, actual financial difficulties, and military difficulties elsewhere, Fath-Ali Shah ultimately conceded defeat to the Russians. On the recommendation of the chief minister Mirza Shafi Mazandarani and others, he grudgingly agreed to this arrangement in the hopes that the British, acting as the Russian emperor's intermediary, could secure a more favorable agreement for him. One observer hypothesized that Fath-Ali Shah's acceptance of peace with Russia was due to Iranian political officials' little knowledge of the world's affairs and their reliance on Ouseley's pledge to advocate for the return of some of the territories under Russian occupation. It was well known that Mirza Shafi, who favored peace with the Russians, knew more about European politics than other politicians in Tehran. He had already come to the conclusion that the war with Russia was unwinnable, therefore he may have tried to stop additional land loss by convincing Fath-Ali Shah to make peace with Russia. Numerous domestic uprisings as well as economic issues were taking place in Iran.

Mirza Abolhassan was chosen by Mirza Shafi Mazandarani to be the only representative of Iran, since Abbas Mirza and Mirza Bozorg refused to ratify any agreement that called for the loss of Iranian territory. On October 2, 1813, with a retinue of 350 people, Mirza Abolhassan departed the city of Tabriz and by October 9 he was at the Golestan village in northern Karabakh, which had been chosen the last negotiation location. He was greeted by the Russian general and negotiator Nikolay Rtishchev, who had been accompanied by a full retinue of soldiers and had been at the village since October 5. Bournoutian states that; "It is clear that Ouseley had decided to cooperate fully with Russia and abandon Iran to its fate. In fact, on October 12, Rtishchev sent a letter to Ouseley in which he thanked the latter for his great services to Russia in these negotiations".

Mirza Abolhassan gave Rtishchev a note by Ouseley, which he requested to be inserted in the draft of the treaty. The note asked for permission for Iran to send an ambassador to Russia in order to ask for the return of their lost lands. As he waited for a reply, Mirza Abolhassan asked Rtishchev whether Russia could give Iran a very little piece of land as an act of goodwill. Rtishchev accepted, thus giving Iran back the town of Meghri, which the Russian army had already withdrawn from. On October 24, Mirza Abolhassan and Rtishchev signed the Treaty of Golestan, on behalf of Iran and Russia, respectively.

Rtishchev inserted Ouseley's note in the margin of the treaty after it was signed, and thus it did not appear in any of the treaty's articles. The Iranian historian Mirza Fazlollah Khavari Shirazi reported that Rtishchev ordered Georgian and Armenian scribes who were proficient in Persian to record the treaty's Persian translation since he would not allow Agha Mirza Mohammad Na'ini to write the treaty's text in that language. The treaty was officially confirmed on 15 September 1814 in Tiflis. Per the terms of the treaty, Iran ceded to Russia the sultanates of Shamshadil, Qazzaq, Shuragol, and the khanates of Baku, Derbent, Ganja, Shakki, Quba, Shirvan, Karabakh, and the northern and central part of Talish. Moreover, Iran also had to abandon its claims over Georgia.

The Treaty of Golestan's territorial arrangements were unclear, for example, in Talish, where it was left up to the mutually appointed administrators to "determine what mountains, rivers, lakes, villages, and fields shall mark the line of frontier." If one of the participants to the treaty felt that the other party had "infringed on" territorial possessions claimed in accordance with the status quo principle, even the limits laid forth in the treaty could be changed. This essentially ensured that territorial conflicts would persist after the treaty's authorization. The region between Lake Gokcha and the city of Erivan remained one of the most disputable, and the Russian military's takeover of the Gokcha district in 1825 served as the catalyst for the second Russo-Iranian War, which lasted from 1826 to 1828.

=== Mission to Russia ===
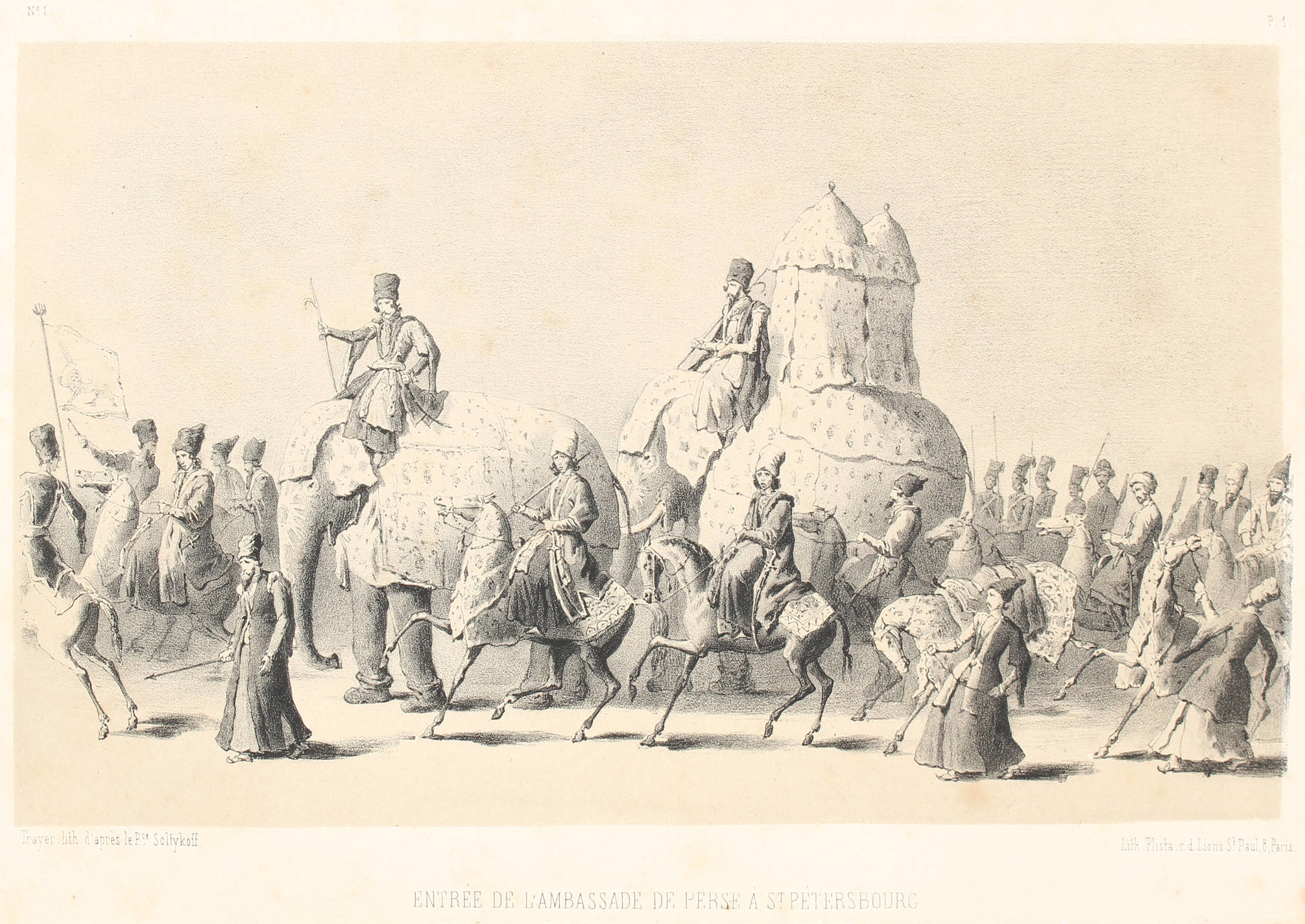
Entrance of the Persian Embassy in Saint Petersburg, as sketched by a young Alexey Saltykov in 1815.

In 1814, Mirza Abolhassan was in charge of the first diplomatic conversation with Russia to affirm the Treaty of Golestan and to discuss the recovery of some of the lost territory. Due to the unavailability of the Russian emperor Alexander I, who was engaged with dealing with Napoleon, the mission lasted until 1816. The trip, which gave the Iranian elite the chance to research Russia in greater detail than ever before, was described by a younger member of the delegation named Mirza Mohammad Hadi Alavi-Shirazi.

The journal blends commonplace daily occurrences with in-depth analyses of Russian society. Because Mirza Abolhassan and his Mirza Mohammad Hadi Alavi-Shirazi have differing degrees of expertise about Russia, it gives the reader a conflicted perspective on that country. Mirza Abolhassan had grown to loathe the Russians through a lifetime of diplomatic experience and was known to have pro-British attitudes. His perceptions of Russia and Russians were also consistent with the stereotype held by his generation, which was that they were "brutes and unclean".

Alexander I would inform Mirza Abolhassan of good news anytime he thought Napoleon posed a danger, and he would treat Mirza Abolhassan him in a rude manner when he thought Napoleon posed no danger. In 1815, after Napoleon was finally defeated and exiled to Saint Helena, maintaining security along its southern frontiers was no longer necessary for the Russian government. Moreover, this also meant that the development of positive ties between Iran and Russia was no longer in the Britain's interest. Mirza Abolhassan also assumed that "the friendship of the British government towards the august government of Iran is the result of Napoleon. Whenever a conflict occurs because of him, they display a willingness to assist Iran, and whenever he rises up and revolts, they give help to Iran. This shows that they are opportunistic." Having failed to achieve his goal, Mirza Abolhassan went back to Tehran.

=== Minister of Foreign Affairs ===
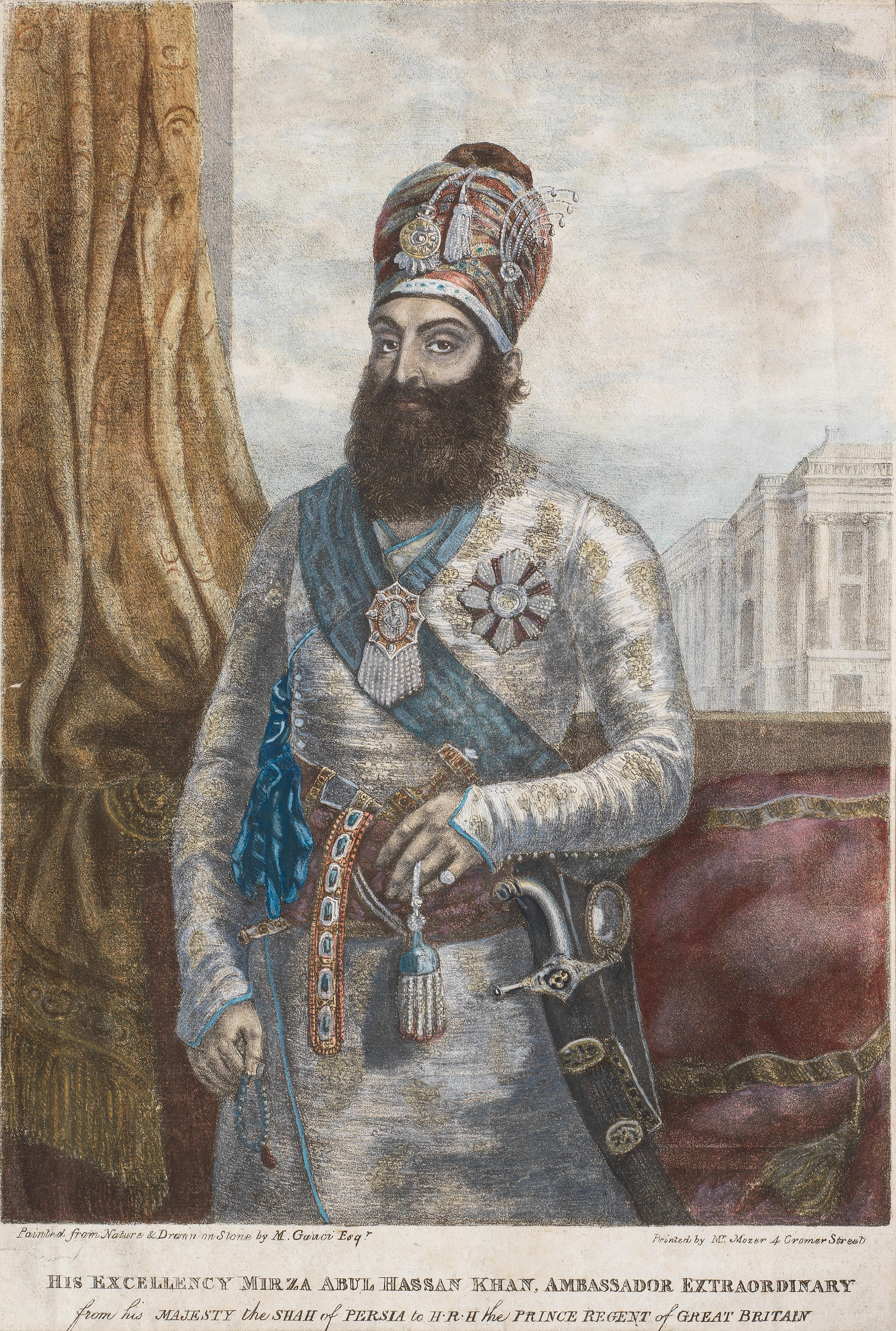
Mirza Abolhassan Khan Ilchi, was painted by Maxim Gauci during his second mission to London in 1819

In 1818–1819, Mirza Abolhassan was dispatched on another official diplomatic mission to Europe, this time to Austria and London, where he was tasked with buying weaponry. Abbas Mirza also instructed Mirza Abolhassan to return to Iran with the students who had been sent to England in 1815. There are reports that Mirza Abolhassan joined the Freemasons during one of his two trips to England. In 1823, he was made the new Minister of Foreign Affairs, thus succeeding Neshat Esfahani. Mirza Abolhassan kept this position and participated in the majority of significant Iranian foreign policy decisions until Fath-Ali Shah's death in 1834.

In early 1825, the northern bank of Lake Gokcha, which the Iranians believed to be a part of their realm, was seized by the Russians under the orders of Aleksey Petrovich Yermolov, the governor of Georgia. The Russian army soon advanced further, capturing Balagh-lu as well. In Fath-Ali Shah's court, two factions had developed during the course of building policy toward Russia. One faction advocated for peace with Russia, and the other for war. Both were heavily lobbying Fath-Ali Shah and Abbas Mirza. The first question at hand was what to do if Russia did not stop their occupation of Gokcha and Balagh-lu. The state of the Muslim minority under Russian authority and, lastly, whether and to what extent Russia had been weakened as a result of its internal crises, were secondary concerns.

Mirza Abolhassan was amongst those who advocated for peace, alongside other prominent figures such as the chief scribe Neshat Esfahani; the head of the royal office Manuchehr Khan Gorji; and the court translator and envoy Mirza Saleh Shirazi. In general, the peace party feared the capability of the Russian Empire and wanted armed conflict to be avoided at all costs. They were more accustomed to dealing with people from other cultures and knew more about Russia.

Those who advocated for war were several prominent Islamic scholars led by Agha Sayyed Mohammad Esfahani; Fath-Ali Shah's new chief minister Asef al-Dowleh; Abbas Mirza's close advisor Abol-Qasem Qa'em-Maqam II; and some of the exiled khans of the Caucasus, who had either been driven away by the Treaty of Golestan or had fled to Iran after the treaty. The main stance of the war party was that the Russians had clearly insulted the Iranians and been aggressive towards them. Agha Sayyed Mohammad, who was on his way to meet Fath-Ali Shah, mentioned Fath-Ali Shah's responsibilities "both as Sovereign of Persia, and as the head of the Mohamedian faith" in a letter to Fath-Ali Shah. Agha Sayyed Mohammad also brought up the Russian annexation of Iranian territory and the treatment of Muslims. Furthermore, the war party's interpretation of Russian events was more optimistic than realistic, arguing that Russia was weak overall, especially in the Caucasus due to Yermolov's recent defeats and the Decembrist revolt in December 1825.

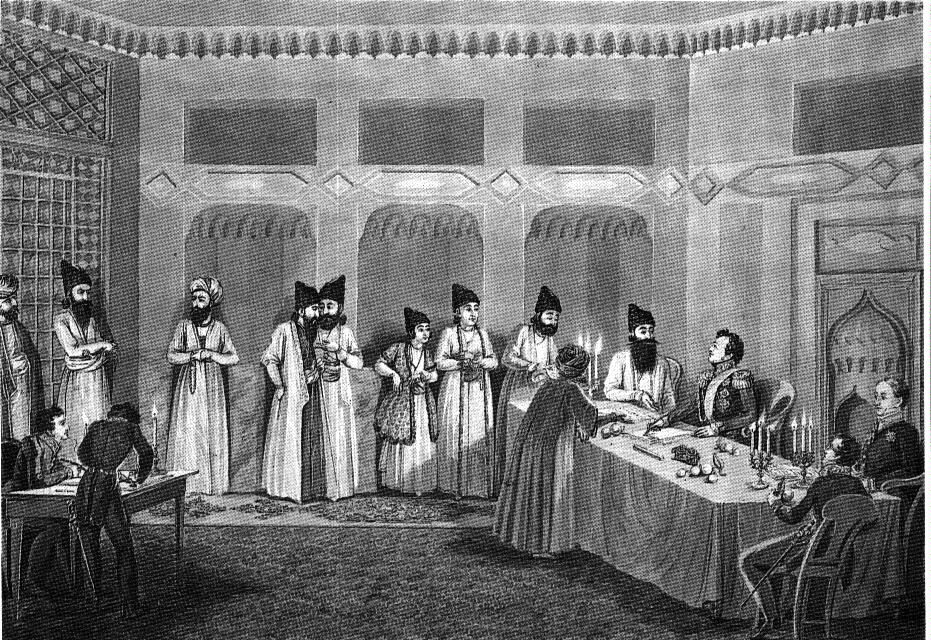
Signing ceremony of the Treaty of Turkmenchay

To advise Fath-Ali Shah and formulate a course of action in this matter, the Council of Soltaniyeh gathered. The peace party at Fath-Ali Shah's court was ultimately outmanoeuvred and the final decision was to launch full-scale warfare against the Russians. In the summer of 1826, full-scale war erupted between Iran and Russia. The Iranians eventually lost the second war with the Russians, and were thus forced to sign the Treaty of Turkmenchay on 28 February 1828, in which they agreed to cede Erivan and Nakhichevan. It was Mirza Abolhassan and Abbas Mirza who signed the treaty on behalf of Iran.

Fath-Ali Shah's death in 1834 sparked riots across the country, and a number of princes, including Hossein Ali Mirza in Shiraz and Ali Shah Mirza in Tehran, proclaimed themselves shahs. After realizing that Mohammad Shah Qajar had appointed Qa'em-Maqam II as his minister, Mirza Abolhassan sided with Ali Shah Mirza. Mohammad Shah eventually defeated Ali Shah and entered Tehran, which led Mirza Abolhassan to seek refuge in the Shah Abdol-Azim Shrine in February 1835. There he stayed until 26 June 1835, when the now disgraced Abol-Qasem Qa'em-Maqam was executed. The latter was succeeded by Haji Mirza Aqasi, who restored Mirza Abolhassan as the Minister of Foreign Affairs in 1838, which he held until his death in 1845.

Following his death, Mirza Abolhassan's seat at the public assembly of the shah was given to his nephew and deputy Mirza Mohammad-Ali Khan Shirazi.

== Works ==
Hayratnameh ("Book of Wonder") is Mirza Abolhassan's only published piece of writing, excluding several formal correspondence. The Hayratnameh is a day-by-day account of Mirza Abolhassan's first trip to Europe and starts with the day he left Tehran and ends with his return to Iran. It is uncertain whether all of the records were written while he was traveling or compiled after he returned to Iran (or both). The title and introduction of the book shares similarities with the Persian travelogue Shigurfnamah-i vilayat ("The Wonders of Vilayat"), written in 1785 by the Bengali-born Muslim scribe Mirza I'tisam al-Din.

Both the British Museum in London and the Maljes Library in Tehran have copies of the Hayratnameh.

== Personality, legacy and assessment ==
Mirza Abolhassan is viewed in a positive light by the majority of contemporary British travelers. An exception is James Baillie Fraser, who says the following about him: "He is so mean and dishonest, in all his dealings, that none who can avoid it will have anything to do with him; and so proverbially false, that none believes a word he says." Iranian academics likewise have a generally negative opinion of Mirza Abolhassan's personality. Assessing Mirza Abolhassans career, Sohrabi states that "Quite remarkably for a man who from the vantage point of later historians was on the losing end of many of his negotiations and activities, Ilchi had a long and prosperous career." According to Neguin Yavari and Isabel Miller; "Given Abu al-Hasan Khan's eventful life, it seems quite natural that there should be contradictory judgements on him and his actions. There are those who believe that he was an agent for foreign powers and blame him greatly for the disastrous treaties of Gulistan and Turkmanchay, which he negotiated and signed."

Mirza Abolhassan visited numerous scientific, industrial, technological, social, and political institutions while he was in Britain, studying many of their contemporary accomplishments. He urged the Iranians to adopt the press, parliament, and the advancements in medicine. The political inexperience that dominated Iran at the time, however, can be seen in Mirza Abolhassan's ignorance of the colonialist practices of the West. Mirza Abolhassan also once recommended to Fath-Ali Shah that a post office be built to handle people's mail deliveries and other needs while also generating income for the budget of the government. Fath-Ali Shah mistook him for mocking him and ordered his execution, but it was called off after the meditation of Ouseley.

In 1824, Morier published The Adventures of Hajji Baba of Ispahan under an unidentified pen name. This dramatized autobiography of Hajji Baba, an Isfahan-born barber's son, was an immediate success in England and was also published in Russian and German. In the story, Hajji Baba travels with Mirza Firuz, an inept Iranian ambassador who was modeled on Mirza Abolhassan, whose popularity he swiftly surpassed. Mirza Abolhassan resented his portrayal in Morier's novel.

== Sources ==
- Amanat, Abbas (1997). "Ebrāhīm Kalāntar Šīrāzī". In Yarshater, Ehsan (ed.). Encyclopædia Iranica. Vol. VIII/1: Ebn ʿAyyāš–Economy V. London and New York: Routledge & Kegan Paul. pp. 66–71. ISBN 978-1-56859-050-9.
- Behrooz, Maziar (2023). Iran at War: Interactions with the Modern World and the Struggle with Imperial Russia. I.B. Tauris. ISBN 978-0755637379.
- Bournoutian, George (1992). The Khanate of Erevan Under Qajar Rule: 1795–1828. Mazda Publishers. ISBN 978-0939214181.
- Bournoutian, George (2016). "Prelude to War: The Russian Siege and Storming of the Fortress of Ganjeh, 1803–4". Iranian Studies. 50 (1). Taylor & Francis: 107–124. doi:10.1080/00210862.2016.1159779. S2CID 163302882.
- Bournoutian, George (2021). From the Kur to the Aras: A Military History of Russia's Move into the South Caucasus and the First Russo-Iranian War, 1801–1813. Brill. ISBN 978-9004445154.
- Daniel, Elton L. (2001). "Golestān Treaty". In Yarshater, Ehsan (ed.). Encyclopædia Iranica. Vol. XI/1: Giōni–Golšani. London and New York: Routledge & Kegan Paul. pp. 86–90. ISBN 978-0-933273-60-3.
- Ghadimi Gheydari, Abbas (2010). "بحران جانشینی در دولت قاجار (از تأسیس تا جلوس محمد شاه قاجار)" [Succession crisis in Qajar government from the establishment of the dynasty to the end of Mohammad Shah Qajar (1794-1847)]. Journal of Historical Researches. 2 (1): 86–106. OCLC 993472864.
- Javadi, H. (1983). "Abu'l-Ḥasan Khan Īḷčī". In Yarshater, Ehsan (ed.). Encyclopædia Iranica. Vol. I/3: Ablution, Islamic–Abū Manṣūr Heravı̄. London and New York: Routledge & Kegan Paul. pp. 308–310. ISBN 978-0-71009-092-8.
- Mousavi, Mehdi (2022). "Moḥammad-ʿAli Khan Širāzi, Mirzā". In Yarshater, Ehsan (ed.). Encyclopædia Iranica (Online ed.). Encyclopædia Iranica Foundation.
- Pourjavady, Reza (2023). "Russo-Iranian wars 1804-13 and 1826-8". Christian-Muslim Relations. A Bibliographical History Volume 20. Iran, Afghanistan and the Caucasus (1800-1914). Brill.
- Sohrabi, Naghmeh (2012). Taken for Wonder: Nineteenth-Century Travel Accounts from Iran to Europe. Oxford University Press. ISBN 978-0199829705.
- Yavari, Neguin; Miller, Isabel (2015). "Abū al-Ḥasan Khān Īlchī Shīrāzī". In Madelung, Wilferd; Daftary, Farhad (eds.). Encyclopaedia Islamica Online. Brill Online. ISSN 1875-9831.
- Wright, Denis (2004). "Abu al-Hasan [Abū'l-Ḥasan] [known as Mirza Abu al-Hasan Shirazi]". Oxford Dictionary of National Biography (online ed.). Oxford University Press. doi:10.1093/ref:odnb/57397. (Subscription, Wikipedia Library access or UK public library membership required.)
- Saltykov, Aleksei Dmitrievich (1850). Voyage en Perse (in French) (1st ed.). Paris, France: Curmer, L.; Lecou, V.

Political offices
Preceded by Neshat Esfahani	Minister of Foreign Affairs; 1823–1834; 1838–1845	Succeeded by Mirza Ali Farahani
Preceded by Mirza Masoud Ansari Garmrudi	Minister of Foreign Affairs; 1823–1834; 1838–1845	Succeeded by Mirza Masoud Ansari Garmrudi
