= Alexey Saltykov (1806–1859) =

Russian prince and diplomat (1806–1859)

Prince Aleksei Dmitrievich Saltykov
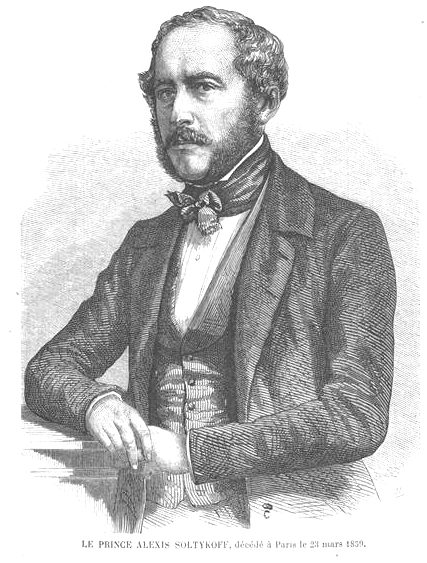
- Prince Alexis Soltikoff
- Born: February 1, 1806; St. Petersburg, Russian Empire
- Died: March 11, 1859 (aged 53); Paris, France
- Known for: Artist, Traveller
- Notable work: "Lettres sur L’Inde," "Drawings on the Spot"

Prince Aleksei Dmitrievich Saltykov (Russian: Алексе́й Дми́триевич Салтыко́в; also known as Alexis Soltykoff; February 1, 1806 – March 11, 1859) was a Russian diplomat, artist and traveller in Iran and India. He was the grandson of Prince Nikolay Saltykov.

== Family ==
Prince Alexei Saltykov (rendered in French, German and English at the time variously as Soltykoff, Saltykoff, Soltikoff, Saltuikov, and Saltykow) was born in St. Petersburg on 1 February 1806 to Prince Dmitri Nikolaevich Saltykov (1767–1826) and Anna Nikolaevna Leontieva (1776–1810). He had three older brothers, the princes Ivan (1797–1832), Petr (ca. 1804–1889) and Vladimir (ca. 1799–1835), and an older sister, Princess Mariya (1795–1823).

Alexei's father Dmitri had two brothers, Aleksandr (1775–1837) and Sergei (1776–1828). The three boys were the sons of the famous General Nikolai Ivanovich Saltykov (31 October 1736 – 24 March 1816) and Natalya Vladimirovna Dolgorukaya (1737–1812).

== Life ==
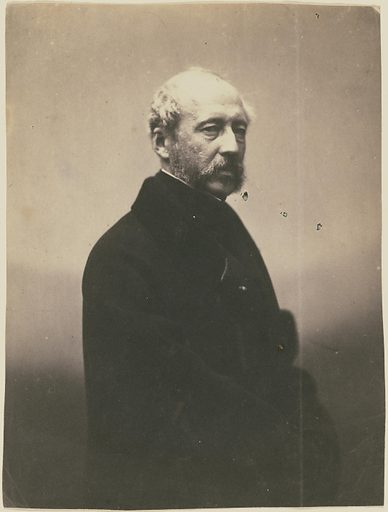
Soltykoff, photographed by Nadar

Alexei's childhood in St. Petersburg is somewhat of a mystery. In his youth he trained with the well-known Polish emigre artist Aleksander Orłowski, who likely influenced Saltykov's interest in ethnographic imagery of the Orient. One of Saltykov's earliest drawings, depicting the Persian embassy march along the Neva in St Petersburg, is now conserved at the Hermitage Museum. At the age of eighteen Saltykov joined the diplomatic services with the Russian State Board (Collegium) for Foreign Affairs in Moscow. By the age of 23 he was with the Russian Foreign Service, first in Constantinople, then in Athens, later in London, Florence, Rome, and Teheran. In 1840 Alexis retired and moved to Paris where he planned his voyages to India. He ended up making two voyages there (1841–43 and 1844–46), acquiring the sobriquet 'The Indian' from the Russian and French aristocracy. Saltykov's collected letters and a handful of lithographs after his drawings were published in French in 1848 as "Lettres sur L'Inde." This books as well as later high quality folios of lithographs after his drawings, including Habitants de L’Inde and Voyages Dans L’Inde Pendant les Années 1841-1842-1843, 1845-1846, became very well known in Europe. In 1851 the book was translated into Russian and became an instant success: it truly enraptured the Russian reading public. The drawings were published separately in London in 1859 as "Drawings on the Spot".

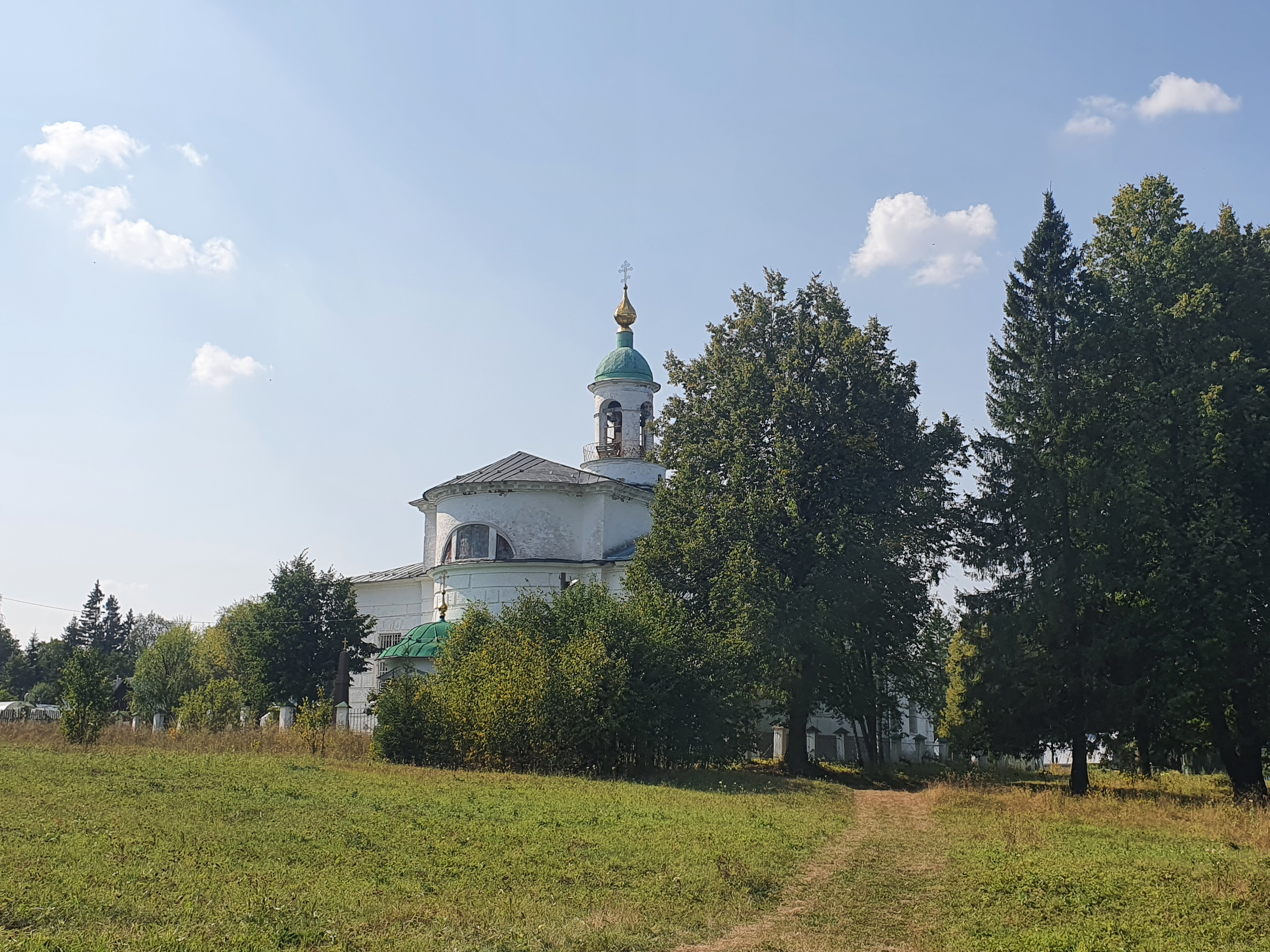
Saltykov was buried in the family crypt at the Church of the Exaltation of the Holy Cross.

Saltykov also acquired a substantial collection of Indian arms and armor during his travels, and weapons frequently appeared in his drawings. These items were given to his brother, the renowned art collector Petr Saltykov. In 1861 Petr auctioned his collection off, and Tsar Alexander II bought the entire collection of Eastern arms and armor for the Tsarskoye Selo Arsenal.

Saltykov died in Paris, 23 March 1859 of heart disease. He is buried under the altar of the Church on his family estate in the village of Snegirevo, Vladimir Oblast, Russia.

== Books ==
Voyages dans l'Inde et en Perse.publishe by V. Lecou, 1853.

The 11th century Gloucester Candlestick was obtained by the V & A from (a) Prince Soltikoff in 1861 and the John Grandisson Triptych which is now in the British Museum was also once part of the Saltykov collection.

== Gallery ==
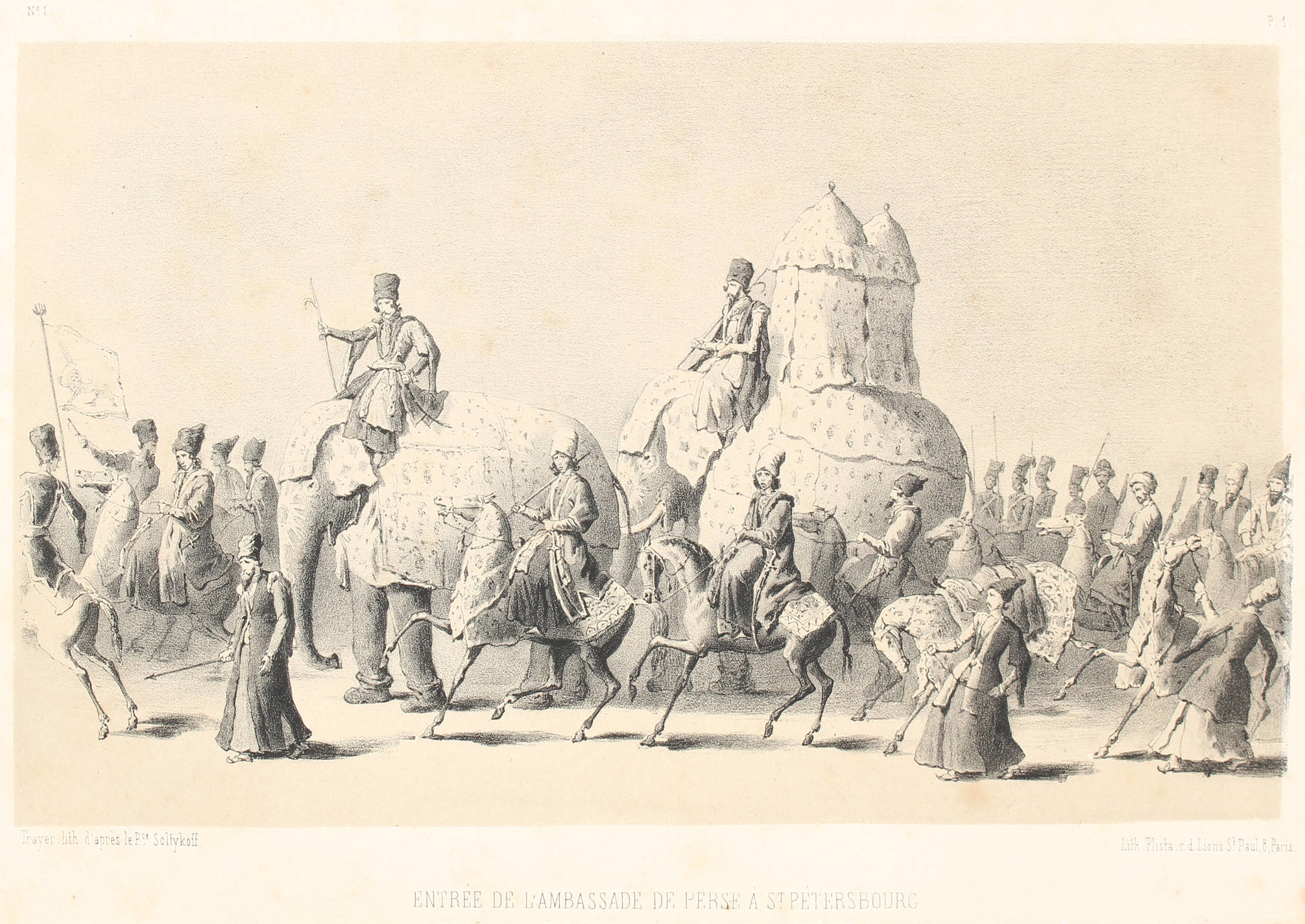
Abdul Hasan Khan's embassy arriving in Saint Petersburg in 1815, sketched by a young Saltykov, who was inspired to travel to the East.

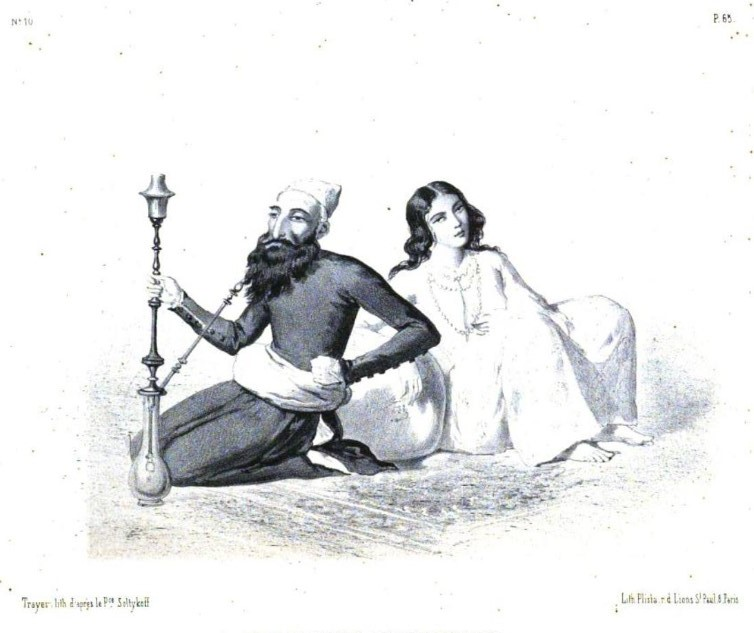
His friend Hadji-Mohammed, a Persian merchant resident of Russia for at least thirty years, reinforced his ambition.

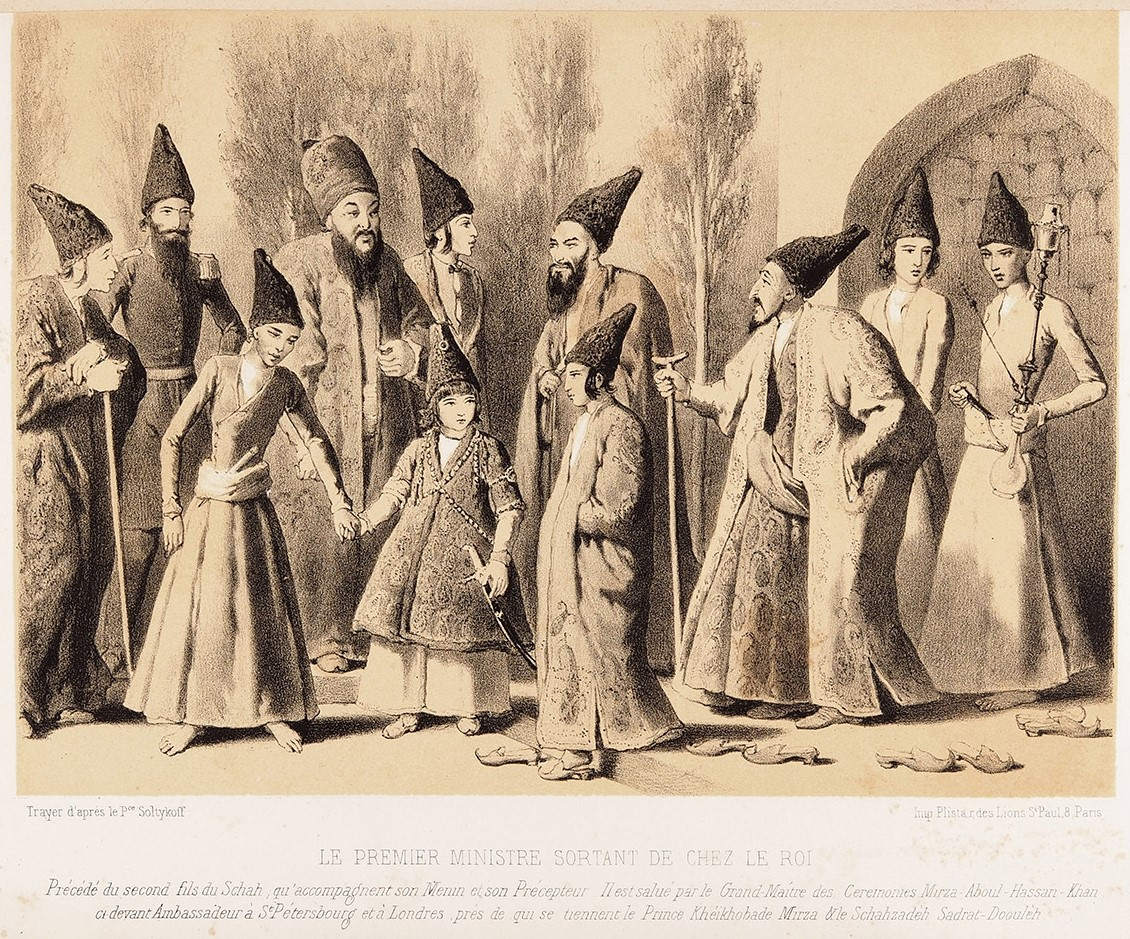
Abbas Mirza Molk-Ara Nayeb-al-saltana in his childhood with his tutor, Reza-Qoli Khan Hedayat, Haji Mirza Aqasi, the grand vizier and Mirza Abolhassan Khan Ilchi; Published in 1850

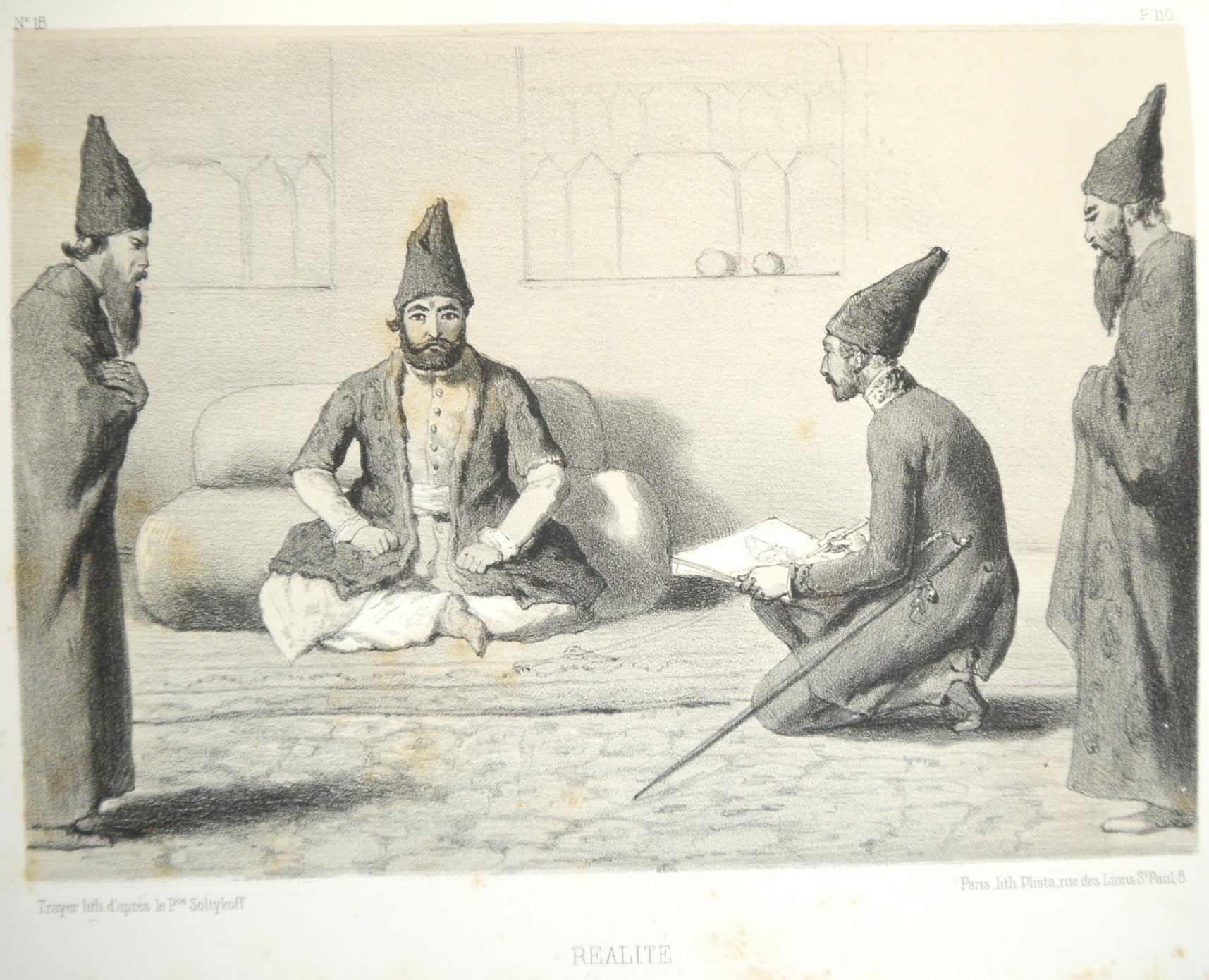
Saltykov sketching Mohammad Shah Qajar, the Shah of Persia, in Tehran in 1838

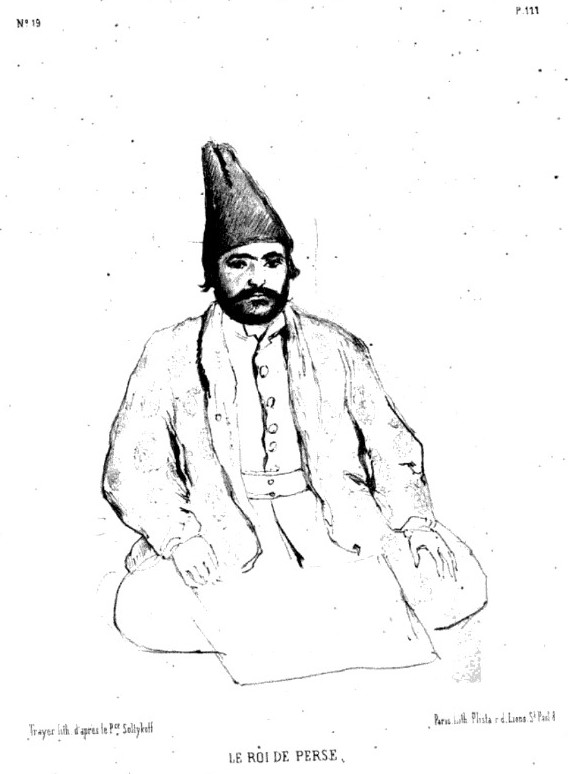
The finished sketch of the Shah.

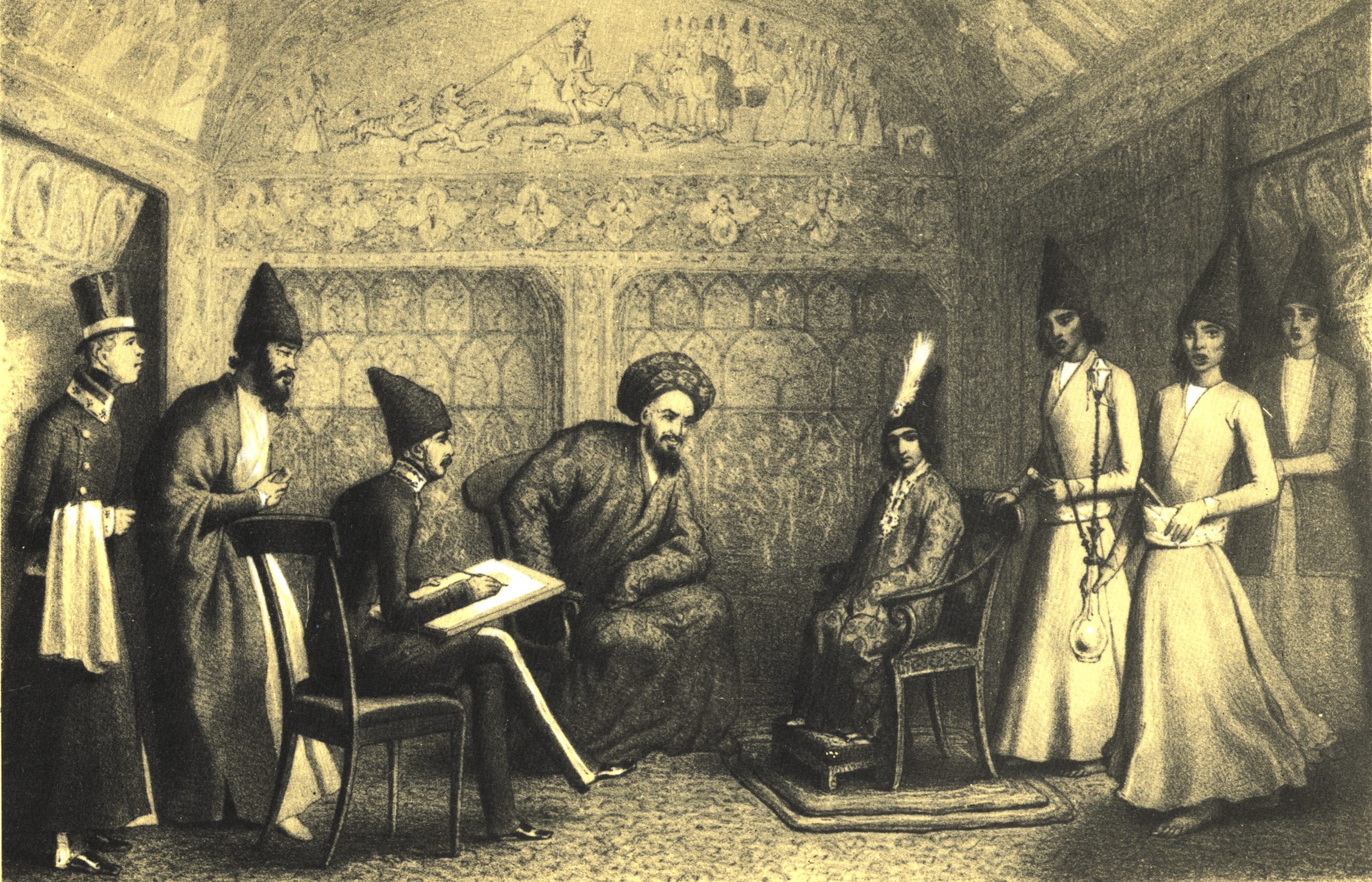
He also sketched the heir to the throne, Naser al-Din Shah Qajar.

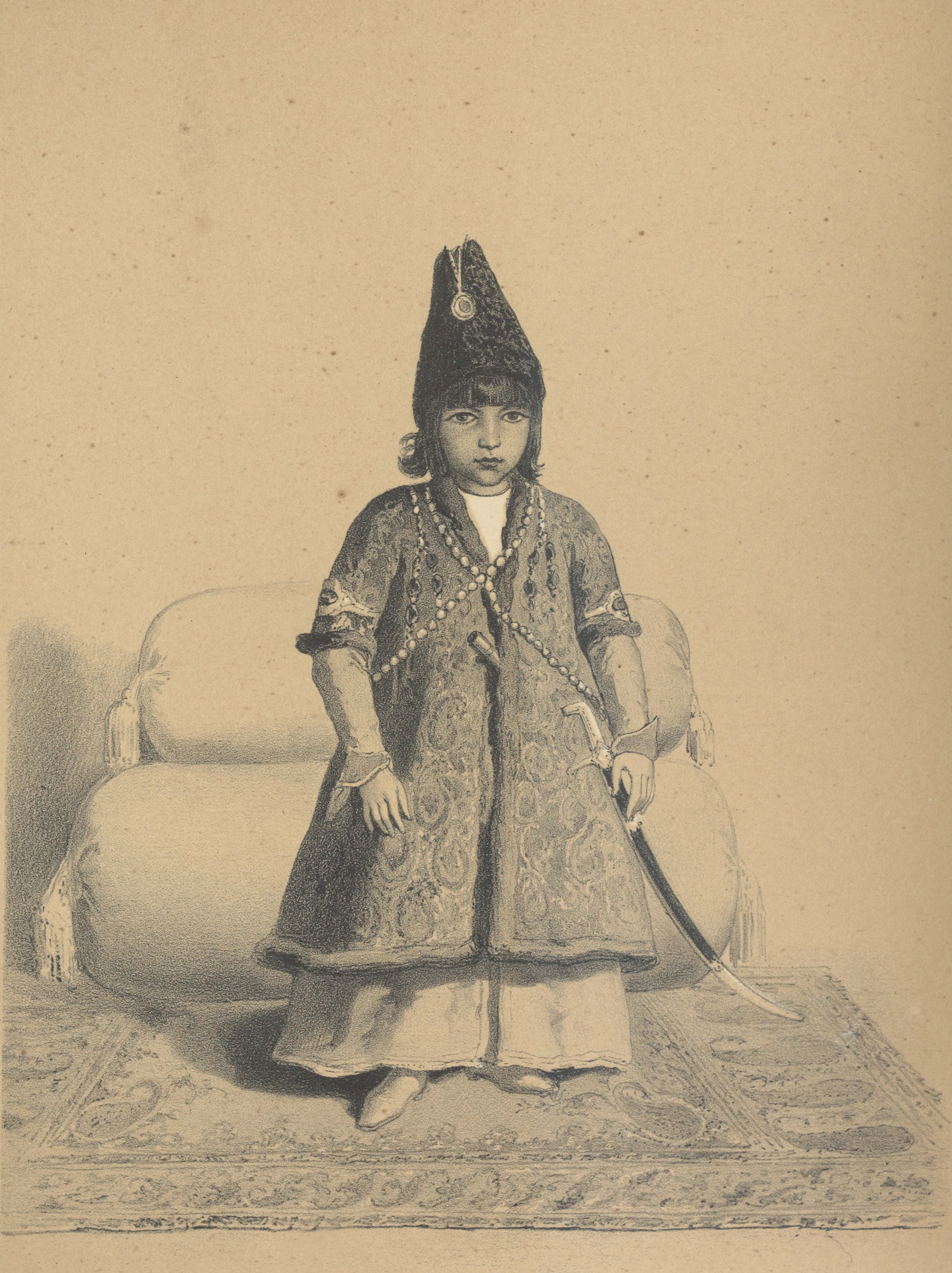
Abbas Mirza Molk-Ara Nayeb-al-saltana in his childhood; Published in 1850

== Gallery ==
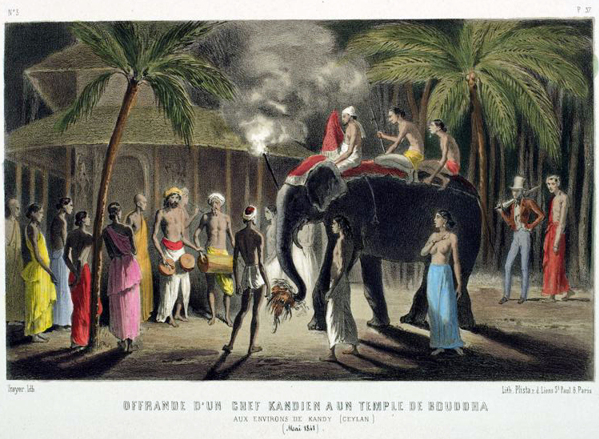
Saltykov attends a dramatic Ballet, performed by Malabars in a wood, near Colombo, April, 1841.

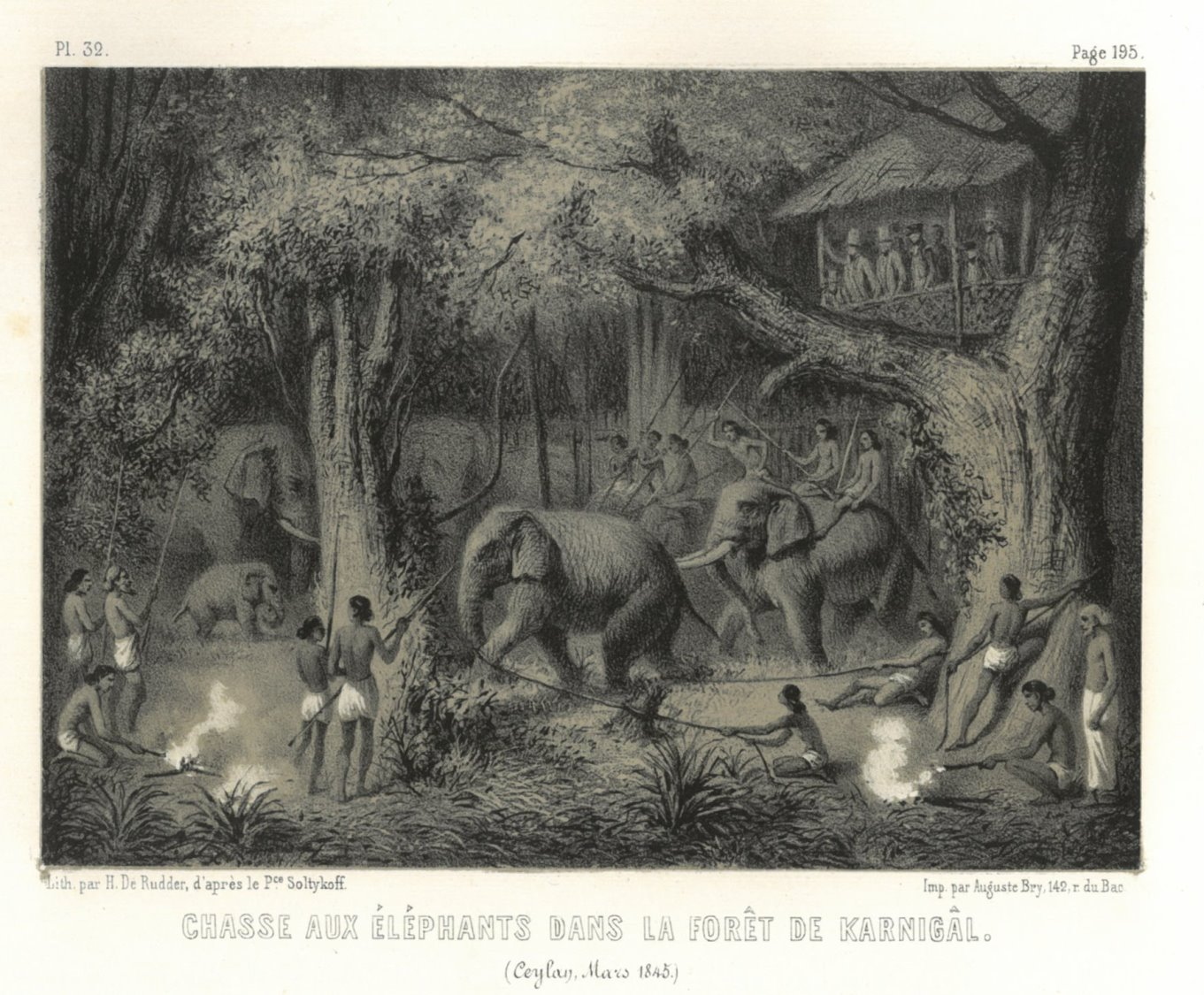
Saltykov witnessing an elephant hunt in Sri Lanka

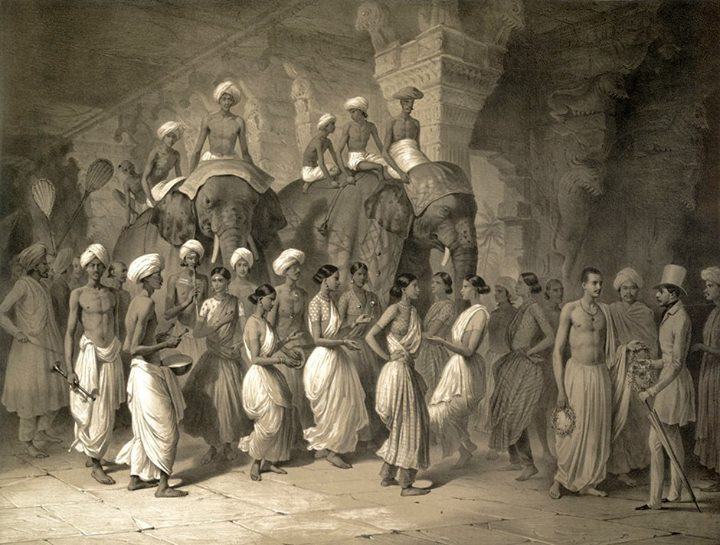
He visits the Ramanathaswamy Temple.

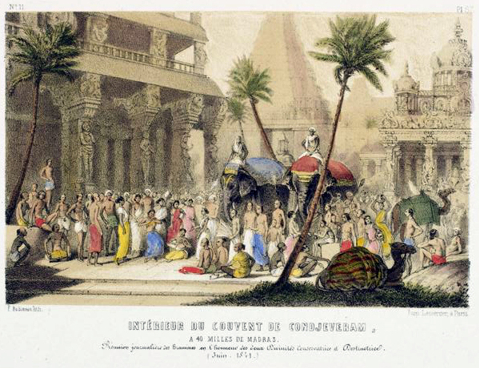
A visit to Condjeveram (Kanchipuram), 40 miles from Madras, June 1841.

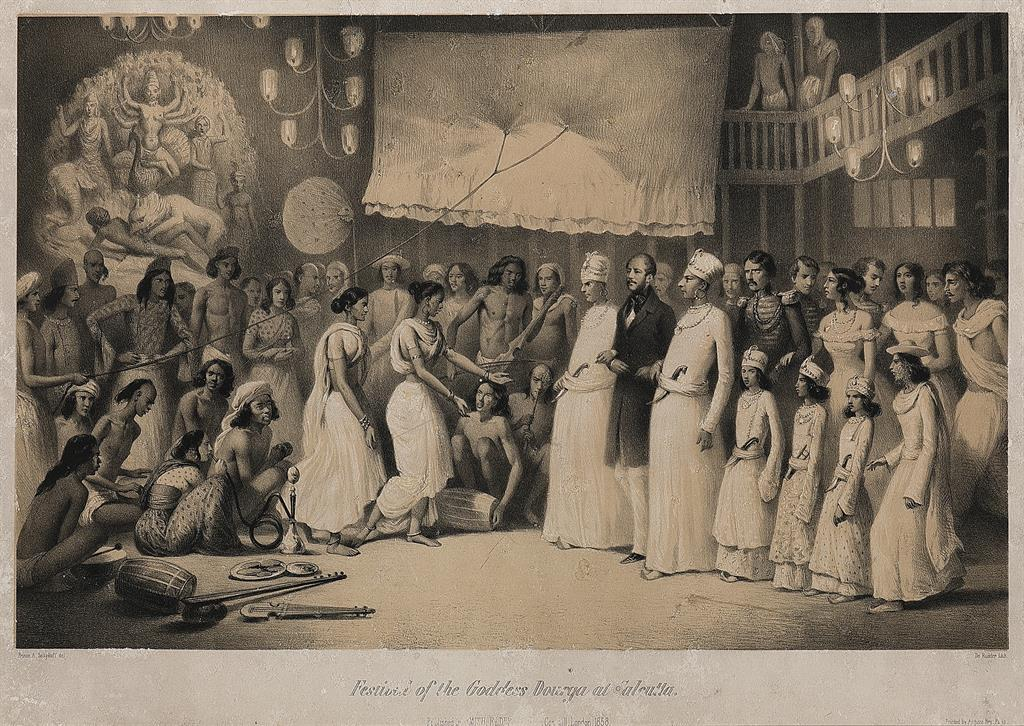
Soltykov attending a company ball in Calcutta for the Festival of the Goddess Durga.

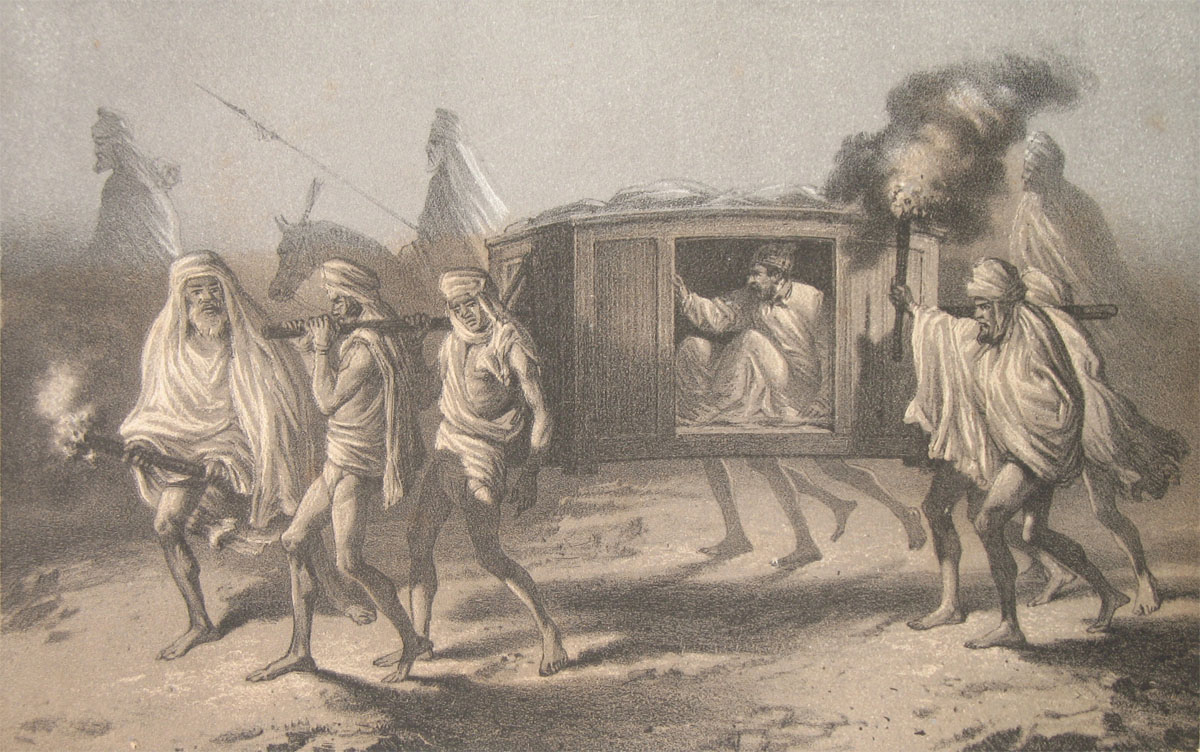
Saltykov travelling by litter over the Punjab Plain.

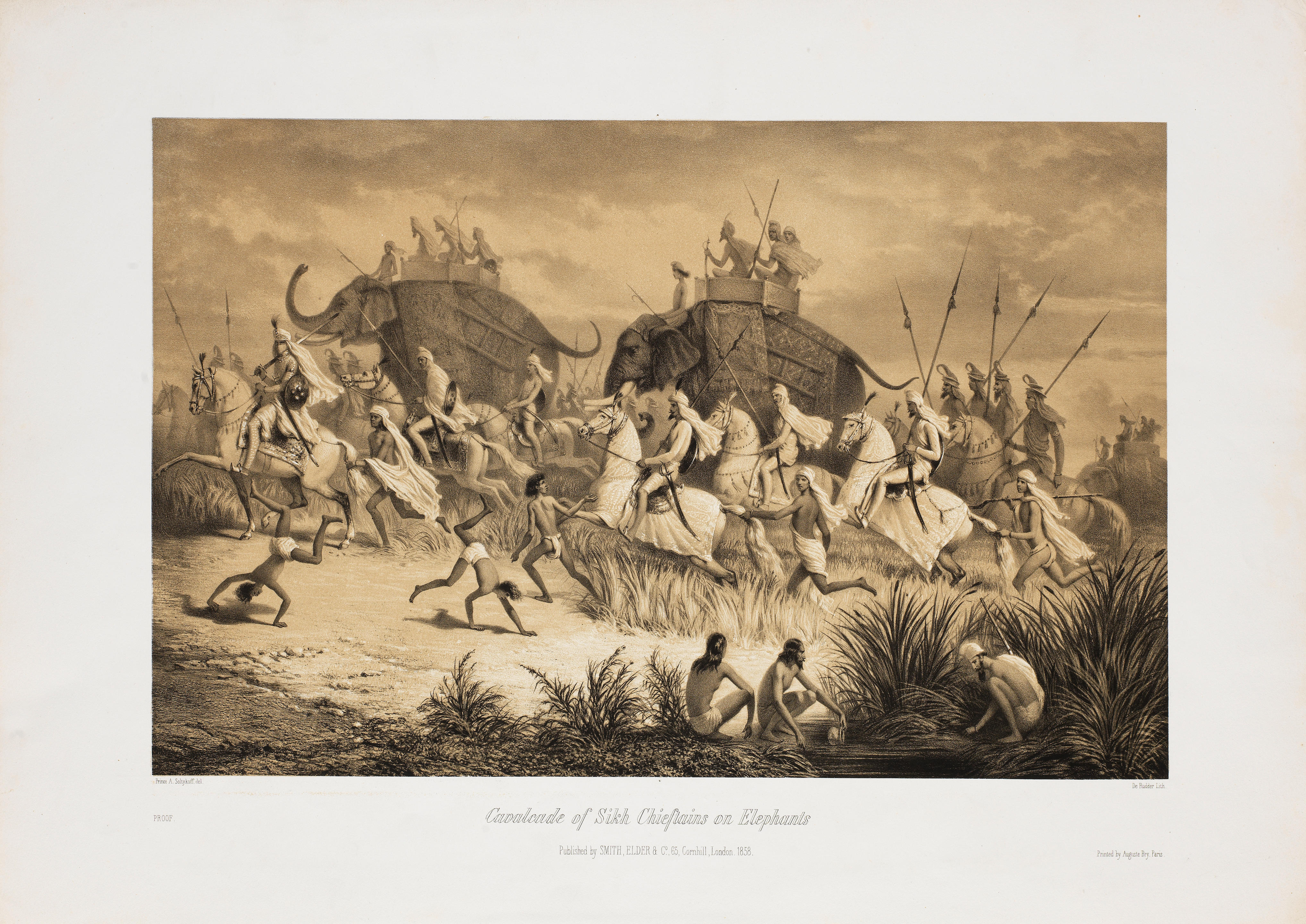
A cavalcade of Sikhs.

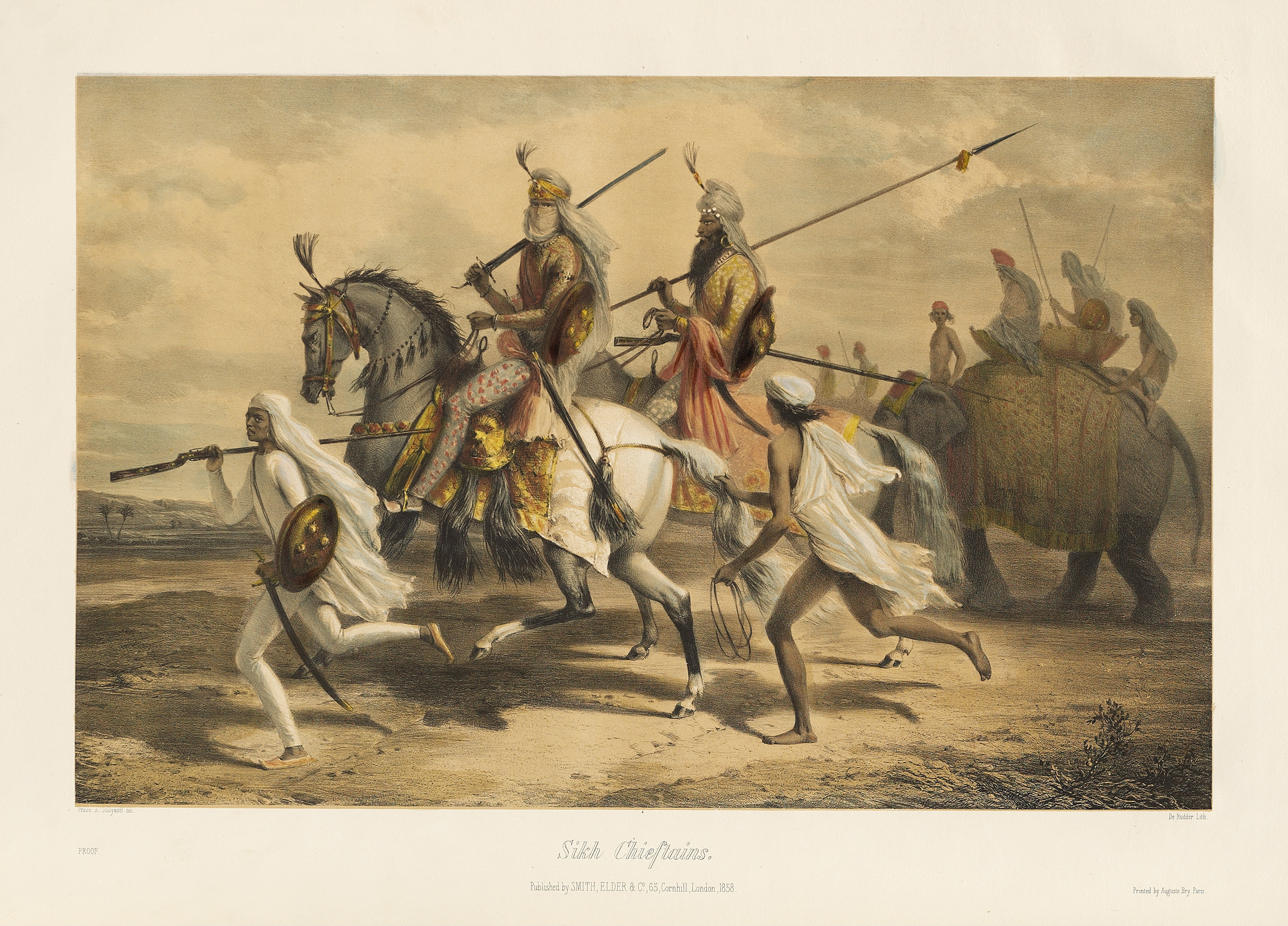
Sikh Chieftains..

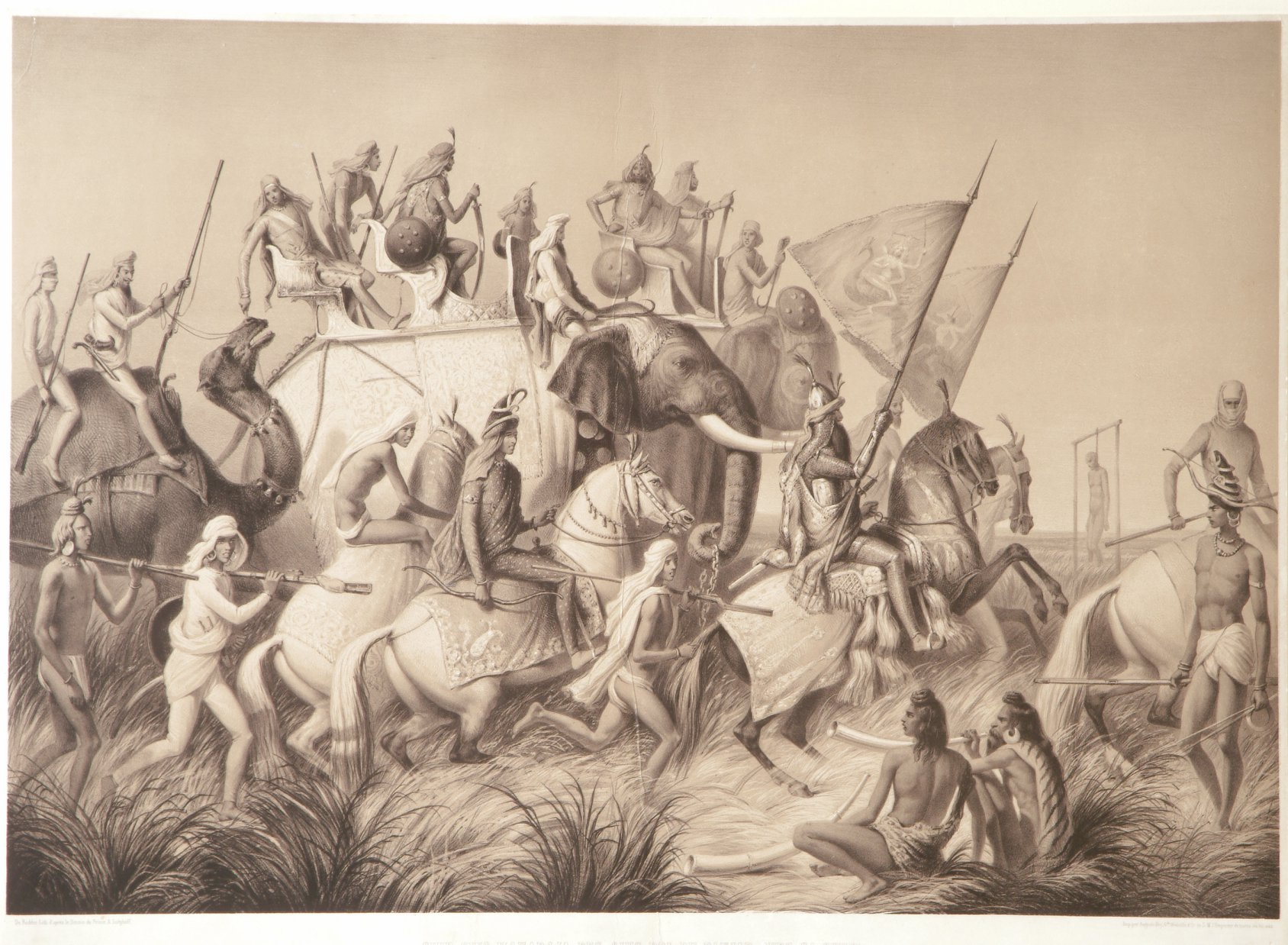
He sketches Sher Singh near Amritsar in March 1842.

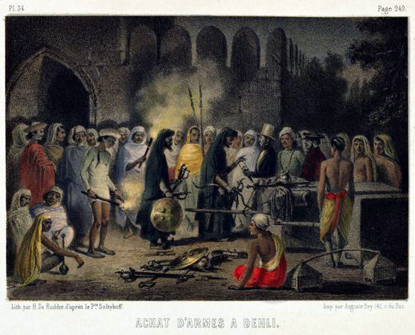
Saltykov buying weapons in Delhi.

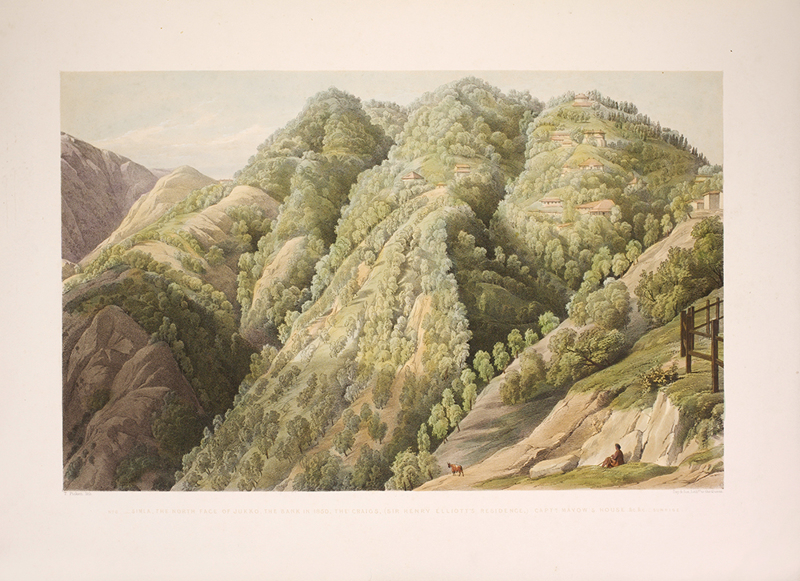
His house on Jakhu Hill, Shimla at the far left, as sketched by Mrs. W.L.L. Scott.

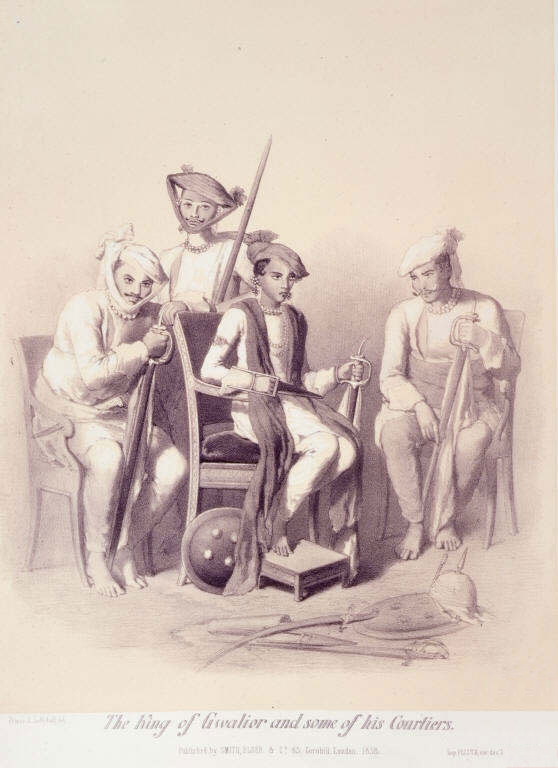
A Saltykov portrait of the Maharaja of Gwalior.

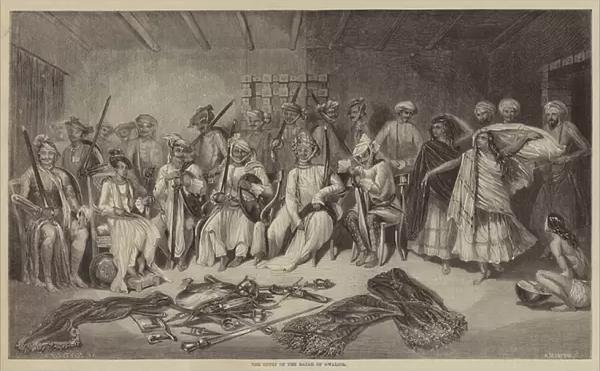
The full Court of Gwailor, published in The Illustrated Times, after a Saltykov sketch.
