= Neshat Esfahani =

Iranian official and poet

Neshat Esfahani Mo'tamed-ol-Dowleh
- نشاط اصفهانی
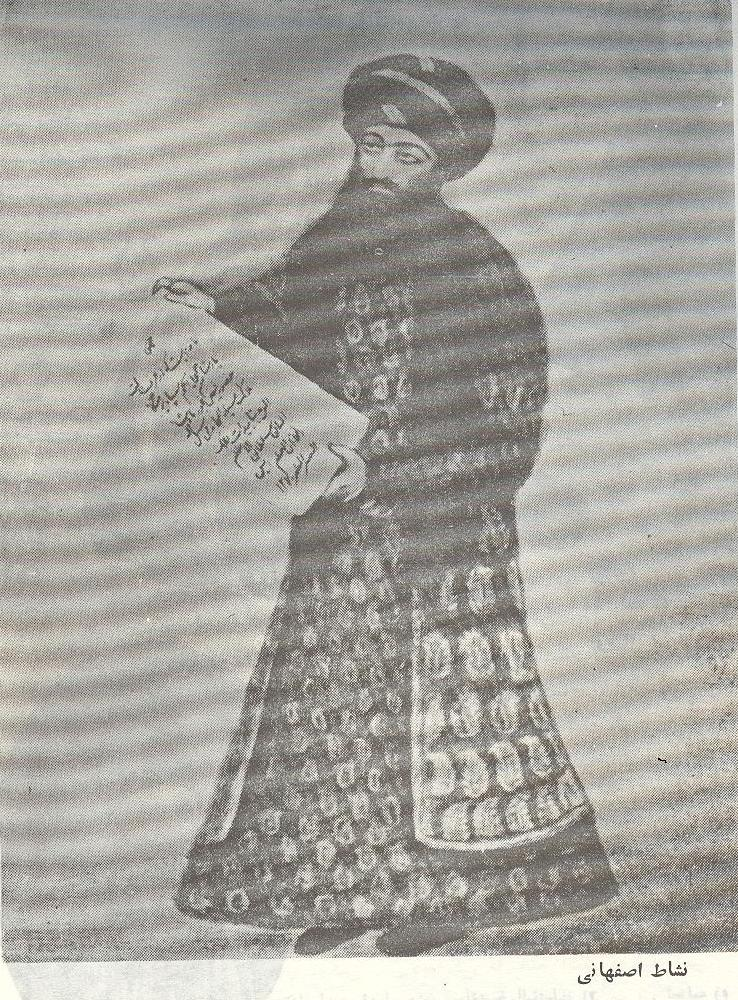

Monshi ol-Mamalek (Head of the Royal chancellery)
- In office 1809/10–1824/5
- Monarch: Fath-Ali Shah Qajar
- Preceded by: Mirza Reza Qoli Nava'i
- Succeeded by: Hajji Mirza Rahim Shirazi

Minister of Foreign Affairs
- In office 1821–1823
- Monarch: Fath-Ali Shah Qajar
- Preceded by: office established
- Succeeded by: Mirza Abolhassan Khan Ilchi

Personal details
- Born: 1759 Isfahan, Zand Iran
- Died: 1829 (aged 69–70) Tehran, Qajar Iran
- Relatives: Mirza Abd ol-Baqi Esfahani (died 1822/3)
- Pen Name: Neshat
- Notable work: Ganjineh-ye Neshat

Mirza Abd ol-Vahhab Mo'tamed ol-Dowleh, (Note: Also spelled "Abd(-)al-Vahhab Mo'tamad(-)al-Dawla".) better known by his pen name Neshat (Note: Also spelled "Nashat".) (1759 – 8 June 1829), was an Iranian official and poet. He wielded great political influence during the reign of Qajar shah ("king") Fath-Ali Shah (r. 1797–1834), under whom he served as head of the royal chancellary (monshi ol-mamalek) and received the title Mo'tamed-ol-Dowleh.

During his time at the Qajar court, Neshat had risen to become a major figure of the bazgasht-e adabi ("literary return") movement, and an avid supporter of Fath-Ali Shah's promotion of such poets. In 1821, he became the first foreign minister of Iran, and during the last years of his life he functioned as the de facto prime minister of Iran, although the titular incumbent was Abdollah Khan Amin ol-Dowleh. Neshat is also regarded as one of the foremost poets and stylists of Persian of the early Qajar era.

== Biography ==
=== Early life and background ===
Neshat was born in 1759 in Isfahan (Note: Hence he is also known as "Neshat-e Esfahani" (including variant spellings).) to a family of well-known sayyeds (Note: Persons claiming descent from the Islamic prophet Mohammad.) who originally hailed from Jahrom in Fars province. His ancestors had served the Safavids as doctors (hakims). His namesake maternal grandfather Abd ol-Vahhab, a patron of the arts, had been the governor of Isfahan and had bequated a large amount of wealth to his children. Neshat received a thorough traditional education, which included studies in Persian and Arabic literatures, as well as theology, mathematics and logic. He rose to become an accomplished calligrapher, with the shekasteh style being his speciality. In addition to his native Persian, he also became fluent in Arabic and Turkish.

Neshat had started composing poetry at a young age and developed an interest in the bazgasht-e adabi ("literary return") movement, which aimed to revive the formal norms of early Persian poetry. At this time, he began writing under the pen name Neshat ("Joy"). Neshat was a key player in the movement, and it is said that the poets and intellectuals from Isfahan would gather at his home. He gained notoriety for the first time during this period.

=== Political stage and later life ===
When Neshat reached the age of forty-three, due to rumours of his poetical gift, he was invited to move to the capital Tehran by Fath-Ali Shah Qajar (r. 1797–1834) in order to become a secretary in his court. In 1809–1810, Neshat replaced Mirza Reza Qoli Nava'i as the head of the royal chancellery (monshi ol-mamalek) of Fath-Ali Shah, and received the title of Mo'tamed-ol-Dowleh. Neshat found himself very often in the company of Fath-Ali Shah, and it appears that from this period on until his death he increasingly drew the most important aspects of government into his own hands. He prepared and wrote the majority of the governing Shah's communications during this time, in addition to many other documents and treaties. Although Neshat was a person of wealth and resources, he nonetheless racked up a debt of almost 30,000 tomans because of his reputation for generosity and hospitality. This trait came under constant rumor and attack from competing courtiers. Neshat's loan was ultimately settled in full by Fath-Ali Shah on his own.

In addition to his position as a royal chancellor, Neshat also undertook numerous diplomatic missions on behalf of the Shah. He accompanied an Iranian mission sent by the Shah to French Emperor Napoleon Bonaparte and in 1817/18 he was sent to quell an uprising in the province of Bakharz and the fortress of Gorian near Herat, which was led by Bonyad Khan, the governor of these two towns. Neshat was captured by the rebels while he was personally leading the Iranian army, but he was able to persuade Bonyad Khan to write a letter to Shoja-ol-Dowleh, the governor of Khorasan, and ask for pardon. Thus, the whole affair was resolved, and Neshat returned to Tehran. In 1821/22, he successfully put down another rebellion in Afghanistan. In October 1821, Fath-Ali Shah, mimicking European examples, founded the Ministry of Foreign Affairs of Iran, with Neshat becoming the first foreign minister of Iran. For four years, Neshat held the position. Together with his successor as foreign minister Mirza Abolhassan Khan Ilchi, Neshat strongly opposed going to war with Russia in 1826, a decision which sparked enmity from the mujtahids who called for jihad against the unbelievers. However, this stance still did not result in Neshat losing favor from Fath-Ali Shah Qajar.

According to the Qajar-era writer Hasan Fasa'i, in 1824/25 the office of chancellor was bestowed upon Hajji Mirza Rahim Shirazi as Neshat's rank had grown past the title and tasks of chancellor of Iran. Due to Neshat's efficiency in fulfilling his duties, Fasa'i adds, he devoted his time dealing with affairs which would have normally been part of the duties of the countries' prime minister. However, Fasa'i notes that Neshat refrained from calling himself Prime Minister. The modern historian Gavin R.G. Hambly, citing Fasa'i, explains that Neshat functioned as de facto prime minister during the last years of his life, although the titular incumbent was Abdollah Khan Amin ol-Dowleh.

During his time at the Qajar court, Neshat had risen to become a major figure of the bazgasht-e adabi movement, and an avid supporter of Fath-Ali Shah's promotion of such poets. Neshat died on 8 Juny 1829 in Tehran as a result of tuberculosis. A chronogram, commemorating his death, read: "Neshat (Joy) has gone from the heart of the world". After his death, Fath-Ali Shah conferred his title of Mo'tamed-ol-Dowleh upon Manuchehr Khan Gorji.

== Literary output ==
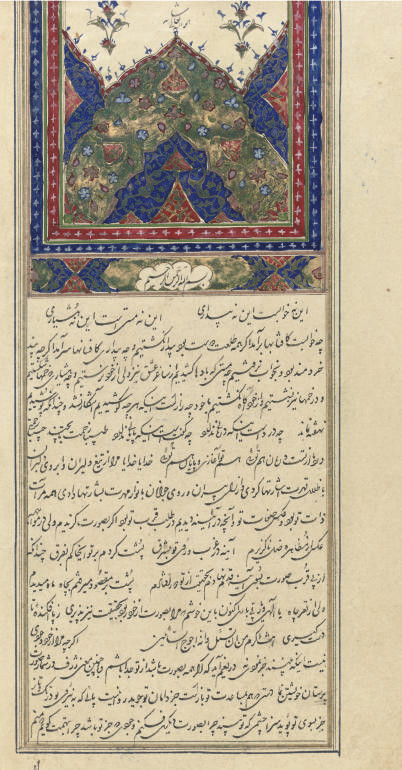
Poetry by Neshat, Qajar Iran, early 19th century. This manuscript may be an original piece written by Neshat himself (rather than being a copy written by a scribe)

Neshat is regarded as one of the greatest Persian poets and stylists of the early Qajar era. He had his poetry compiled into a book, entitled Ganjineh-ye Neshat ("Treasure of Joy"), which was published in Tehran after his death in 1850. Several years later, in 1864–1865 in Tehran, Naser al-Din Shah Qajar (r. 1848–1896) had all of Neshat's literary works compiled and lithographed into one volume. All of Neshat's poetry and prose are included in the book's five sections. His writing mostly comprises the content of official papers and letters. Considered to be especially noteworthy is Neshat's letter to George III (r. 1760–1820), in which he expressed grief about the breakdown of amicable relations between Great Britain and Iran.

Neshat's other prose works include didactic pieces as well as short anecdotes, written in imitation of Saadi Shirazi's Golestan in a "very refined prose style interspersed with poetry".

Neshat's poetry includes qasidehs (panegyrics), tarkib-bands, masnavis (poems in rhyming couplets on any theme), as well as ghazals (short lyric poems of syntactically independent couplets). Although he was not within the confines of what could be labeled as a panegyrist, he did write several qasidehs wherein he praised Fath-Ali Shah in a very exaggerated manner. The 250 ghazals which he wrote, however, are Neshat's greatest contribution to Persian literature. Although Neshat's lyrical poetry followed the style of Saadi and Hafez, his ghazals contain a freshness and to a certain degree of originality both in language and in subject matter. They are therefore considered to be distinguishable from those of his great predecessors "by elegance, simplicity, smooth rhythm and considerable depth of feeling". As with other poets in Qajar Iran at the time, Neshat was attracted to Sufism and associated with Sufis. This can also be seen in his poetry, with most of his ghazals being "tinged with Sufi sentiments".

Two manuscripts of the Shahanshah-nameh, composed by Saba (Fath-Ali Khan Kashani), include a prose preface written by Neshat wherein he narrates the genesis of the composition.

== Impression ==
The impression Neshat left on at least some visitors from Europe was favourable to a degree. Neshat was described as "... beyond all comparison the most eminent man at court for talents, probity, general popularity, and attachment to his master's interest" by the Scottish travel writer James Baillie Fraser (1783–856) at the time. Fraser praised Neshat's honesty and lack of intrigue while praising his plain manners. Neshat apparently had the ability to personally inform Fath-Ali Shah about the princes' wrongdoings. On his side, Fath-Ali Shah was open to hearing Neshat out and was wise enough to assign Neshat as the main contact for dealing with European ambassadors in Iran.

== Sources ==
- Abe, Naofumi (2017). "The Politics of Poetics in Early Qajar Iran: Writing Royal-Commissioned Tazkeras at Fath-ʿAli Shāh's Court". Journal of Persianate Studies. 10 (2): 129–157. doi:10.1163/18747167-12341311.
- Behrooz, Maziar (2023). Iran at War: Interactions with the Modern World and the Struggle with Imperial Russia. I.B. Tauris. ISBN 978-0-7556-3737-9.
- Berthels, E. (1993). "Nas̲hāṭ". In Bosworth, C. E.; van Donzel, E.; Heinrichs, W. P. & Pellat, Ch. (eds.). The Encyclopaedia of Islam, Second Edition. Volume VII: Mif–Naz. Leiden: E. J. Brill. ISBN 978-90-04-09419-2.
- Hambly, Gavin R.G. (1991). "Irān during the reigns of Fatḥ ʿAlī Shāh and Muḥammad Shāh". In Avery, Peter; Hambly, Gavin R. G.; Melville, Charles Peter (eds.). The Cambridge History of Iran: From Nadir Shah to the Islamic Republic. Vol. 7. Cambridge: Cambridge University Press. ISBN 0-521-20095-4.
- Javadi, H. (1982). "ʿABD-AL-VAHHĀB MOʿTAMAD-AL-DAWLA". In Yarshater, Ehsan (ed.). Encyclopædia Iranica. Vol. I/2: ʿAbd-al-Hamīd–ʿAbd-al-Hamīd. London and New York: Routledge & Kegan Paul. pp. 170–171. ISBN 978-0-71009-091-1.
- Schwartz, Kevin L. (2020). Remapping Persian Literary History, 1700-1900. Edinburgh University Press. ISBN 978-1474450843.
