= Portrait of Mirza Abul Hasan =

1810 painting by Thomas Lawrence

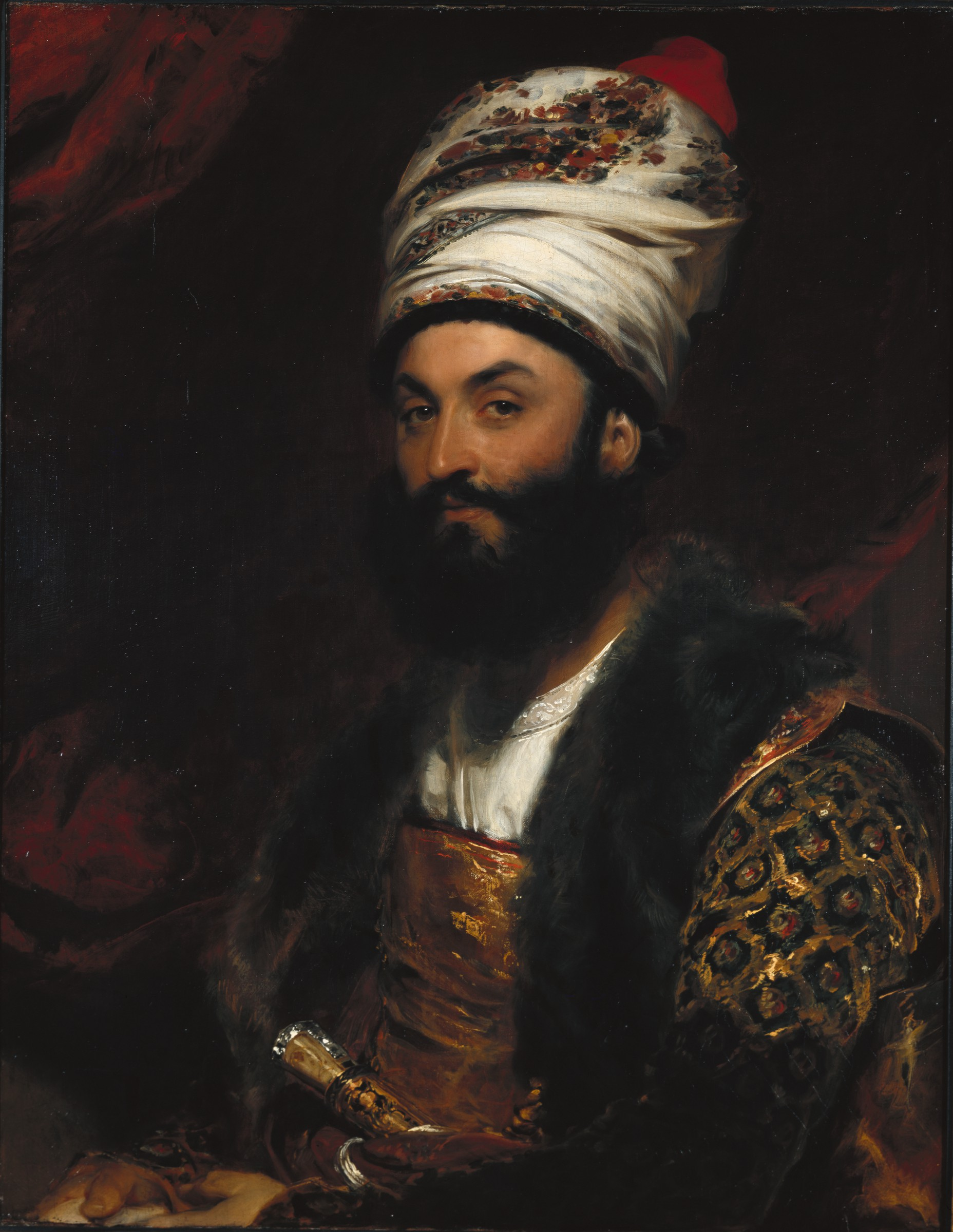
- Artist: Thomas Lawrence
- Year: 1810
- Type: Oil on canvas, portrait
- Dimensions: 88.9 cm × 69.2 cm (35.0 in × 27.2 in)
- Location: Harvard Art Museums, Cambridge, Massachusetts

Portrait of Mirza Abul Hasan is an oil on canvas portrait painting by the English artist Thomas Lawrence depicting Mirza Abolhassan Khan Ilchi, the Persian envoy to Britain. It was created in 1810.

== History and description ==
Mirza Abul Hasan was the first diplomatic envoy sent to the country since the seventeenth century. He was well received by high society and attracted interest in the press. The painting was commissioned by Sir Gore Ouseley who had been appointed as the ambassador's guide during his stay on Britain. He had a distinguished career in the diplomatic service and returned again to England on another mission. In 1824 he was appointed Persia's first Minister of Foreign Affairs.

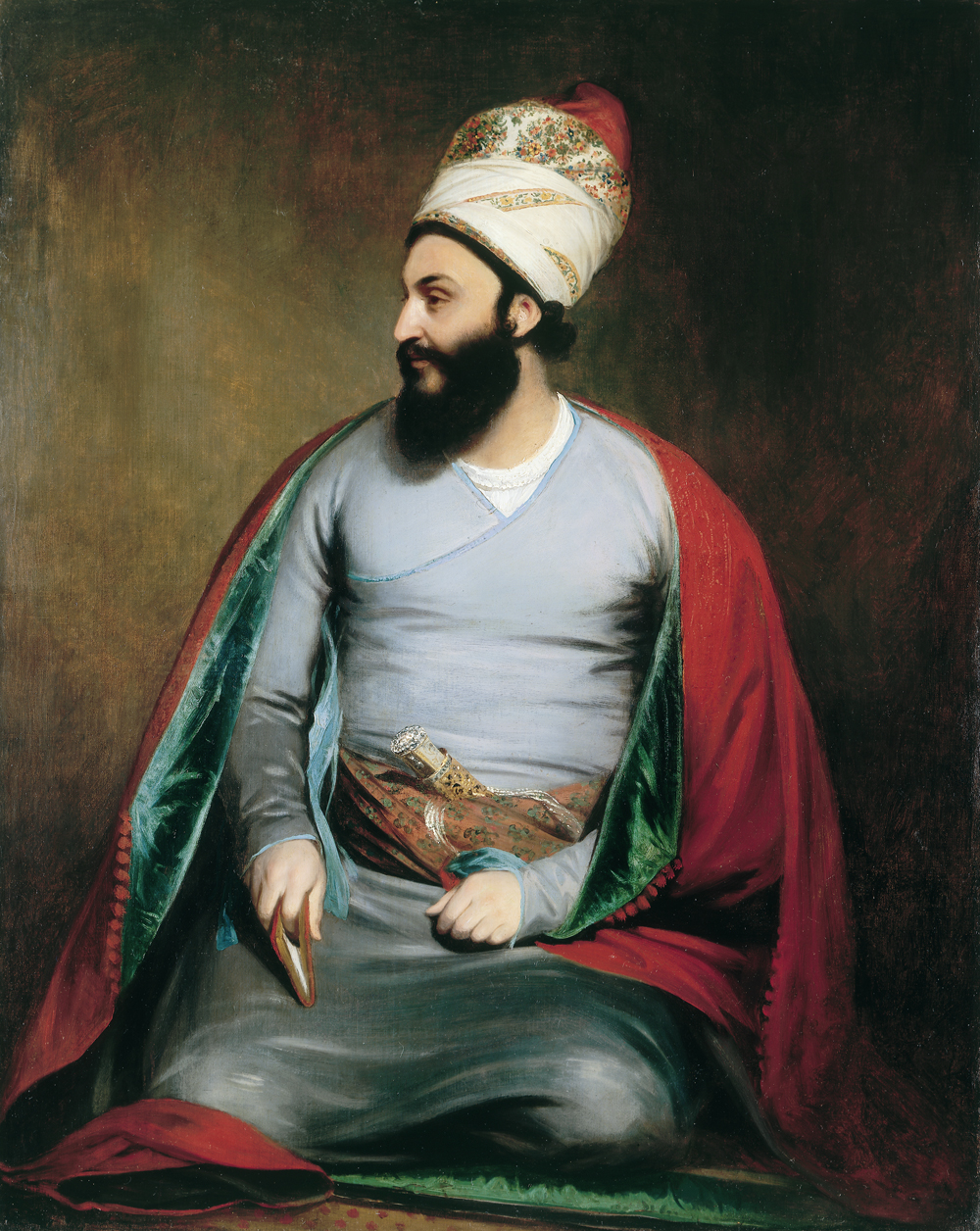
Portrait of Mirza Abul Hasan by William Beechey, 1810

Lawrence, a future President of the Royal Academy, was a leading portraitist when he received the commission. He had a relatively short time-span to work due to the ambassador's imminent departure. Lawrence was unused to painting beards, as the Regency era fashion was for clean-shaven faces. He also had to portray the sitter's turban and ornamental dagger. A full-length painting of the ambassador by William Beechey was also produced.

Today the Lawrence portrait is part of the collection at Harvard Art Museums.

== Bibliography ==
- Holmes, Richard. Thomas Lawrence Portraits. National Portrait Gallery, 2010.
- Levey, Michael. Sir Thomas Lawrence. Yale University Press, 2005.
