= Mirza Reza Qoli Nava'i =

Iranian statesman (18th–19th century)

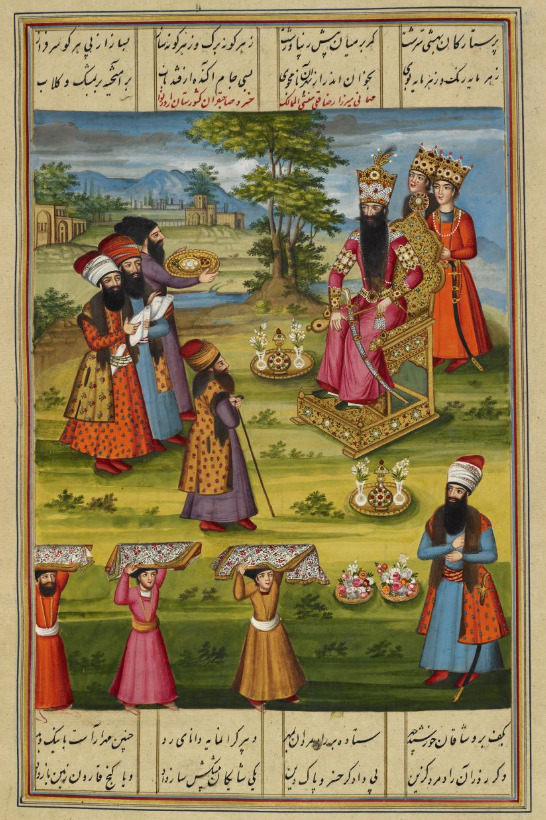
Fath-Ali Shah Qajar, enthroned in a garden on the Naderi Throne, with two princes in attendance, receiving presents from Mirza Reza Qoli Nava'i. Folio from the Shahanshah-nameh of Fath-Ali Khan Saba, dated 1810

Mirza Reza Qoli Nava'i (Persian: میرزا رضا قلی نوایی) was the monshi ol-mamalek (head of the royal chancellery) in Iran during the reign of the Qajar shah (king) Fath-Ali Shah Qajar (r. 1797–1834). Both foreign policy and the shah's chief of staff duties fell within the scope of his authority. He served as monshi ol-mamalek until 1809, when Fath-Ali Shah designated him as the chief minister of his fourth son, Mohammad Vali Mirza, who ruled Khorasan. The office of monshi ol-mamalek subsequently went to Neshat Esfahani.

== Sources ==
- Behrooz, Maziar (2023). Iran at War: Interactions with the Modern World and the Struggle with Imperial Russia. I.B. Tauris. ISBN 978-0-7556-3737-9.
