= List of generals of the Azerbaijan Democratic Republic Armed Forces =

On May 28, 1918, Azerbaijan declared its independence. By the decision of the Council of Ministers of the Azerbaijan Democratic Republic dated June 26, 1918, the Azerbaijani Special Corps was established with 5,000 personnel led by General Ali-Agha Shikhlinski. On July 11, military mobilization was announced by a government decree. All Muslim citizens of the Republic of Azerbaijan born in 1894-1899 were called up for military service. Samad bey Mehmandarov was appointed Minister of War.

== List ==
These were the generals of the army:

Number	Image	Name	Birth date	Birthplace	Death date	Death place	Activity
1		Samad bey Mehmandarov	16 October 1855	Lenkoran (Lankaran), Lenkoran uezd, Elizavetpol Governorate, Russian Empire	12 February 1931	Baku, Azerbaijan Soviet Socialist Republic, Soviet Union	General of the Artillery in the Imperial Russian Army and served as Minister of Defense of the Azerbaijan Democratic Republic.
2		Ali-Agha Shikhlinski	3 March 1863	Aşağı Salahlı, Kazakh (Qazax), Kazakh uezd, Elizavetpol Governorate, Russian Empire	18 August 1943	Baku, Azerbaijan Soviet Socialist Republic, Soviet Union	Lieutenant-general of the Russian imperial army, Deputy Minister of Defense and General of the Artillery of Azerbaijan Democratic Republic and a Soviet military officer.
3		Khosrov bey Sultanov	10 May 1879	Kürdhacı, Zangezur uezd, Elizavetpol Governorate; Russian Empire	7 January 1943	Kars; Turkey	General Governor of Karabakh and Minister of Defense of the Azerbaijani Democratic Republic.
4		Ibrahim agha Vekilov	7 May 1853	Kazakh (Qazax), Kazakh uezd, Elizavetpol Governorate, Russian Empire	2 June 1934	Baku; Azerbaijan Soviet Socialist Republic, Soviet Union	The first Azerbaijani specialist in topography, major-general, the first person in the Caucasus to be awarded the rank of major-general in military topography.
5		Habib bey Salimov	8 February 1881	Erivan (Yerevan), Erivan uezd, Erivan Governorate, Russian Empire	30 December 1920	Baku, Azerbaijan Soviet Socialist Republic	The first Chief of General Staff of Azerbaijani Armed Forces of the Azerbaijan Democratic Republic. After occupation of Azerbaijan by Bolsheviks, Salimov was appointed Military Commissar to Nakhchivan. However, Salimov refused to work with Bolsheviks and was arrested on September 1, 1920. On December 30, 1920, he was executed by firing squad.
6		Maciej Sulkiewicz	20 June 1865	Kiemiejšy, Vilna Governorate, Russian Empire (present-day Belarus)	15 July 1920	Baku, Azerbaijan Soviet Socialist Republic	Lieutenant general in the Russian Empire, Prime Minister of Crimean Regional Government (1918), and Chief of General Staff of Azerbaijani Armed Forces in 1918–20. He was executed by the Bolsheviks, after the Bolshevik invasion of Azerbaijan in 1920.
7		Ibrahim bey Usubov	6 March 1872	Yukhary-Salakhly, Kazakh uezd, Elizavetpol Governorate, Russian Empire	30 December 1920	Baku, Azerbaijan Soviet Socialist Republic	Major General in Russian Imperial Army and Azerbaijan Democratic Republic.
8		Firudin bey Vazirov	19 April 1850	Tiflis, Tiflis Governorate, Russian Empire	30 June 1925	Baku, Azerbaijan Soviet Socialist Republic, Soviet Union	Major-general in Russian Imperial Army and Azerbaijan Democratic Republic. He was executed on June 30, 1925, in Baku.
9		Amir Kazim Mirza Qajar	1 May 1853	Shusha, Shusha uezd, Shemakha Governorate, Russian Empire	30 June 1920	Ganja, Azerbaijan Soviet Socialist Republic	Prince of Persia's Qajar dynasty, Imperial Russian and Azerbaijani military commander, having the rank of Major-General. After the Red Army invasion of Azerbaijan and the suppression of the anti-Soviet uprising in Ganja, Mirza Kazim Qajar was arrested, and executed by the Bolsheviks in the Ganja.
10		Sadykh bey Aghabeyov	15 March 1865	Goychay, Baku Governorate	9 October 1944	Lviv, Ukraine	General in the Russian Imperial Army and Azerbaijani politician in Azerbaijan Democratic Republic, founder and reformer of Azerbaijani Police, Deputy Minister of Internal Affairs of Azerbaijan Democratic Republic, Major General, Orientalist.
11		Feyzulla Mirza Qajar	15 December 1872	Shusha, Shusha uezd, Elizavetpol Governorate, Russian Empire	June 1920	Boyuk Zira, Baku, Azerbaijan Soviet Socialist Republic	Prince of Persia's Qajar dynasty and a decorated Imperial Russian and Azerbaijani military commander, having the rank of Major-General. In the Russian imperial army, he was the commander of the 1st Caucasian Native Cavalry Division, and the commander of Ganja garrison in the army of Azerbaijan Democratic Republic. After the Sovietization of Azerbaijan and the suppression of the anti-Soviet uprising in Ganja, Feyzulla Mirza Qajar was arrested, taken to Baku and executed by the Bolsheviks on the island of Nargin.
12	First row, third from left	Amanullah Mirza Qajar	8 January 1857	Shusha, Shusha uezd, Elizavetpol Governorate, Russian Empire	1937	Tehran, Iran	Prince Persia's Qajar dynasty and Imperial Russian and Azerbaijani military commander, obtaining the rank of Major General.
13		Abdulhamid bey Gaytabashi	1884	Tiflis, Tiflis uezd, Tiflis Governorate, Russian Empire	1920	Baku, Azerbaijan Soviet Socialist Republic	The last Chief of General Staff of Azerbaijani Armed Forces of Azerbaijan Democratic Republic before its occupation by the Red Army in April 1920. He was Major-general./ In June, 1920 he was executed by firing squad for his alleged role in Ganja revolt.
14		Murad Giray bey Tlexas	21 October 1874	Yekaterinodar (Krasnodar), Yekaterinodarsky Otdel, Kuban Oblast, Russian Empire	29 May 1920	Baku, Azerbaijan Soviet Socialist Republic	Major General of the Army of the Azerbaijan Democratic Republic. He is originally a Circassian. He was executed by firing squad on May 29, 1918.
15		Gennady Tarkhanov	8 September 1854	Russian Empire	[Unknown]	[Unknown]	head of the Engineering Department

== See also ==
- List of Soviet repressions of Azerbaijani military officers (1920–1938)
