= Ali Qulu Mirza Qajar =

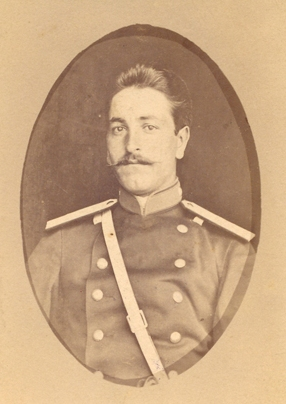
- Born: Ali Qulu Mirza Bahman Mirza oglu Qajar; May 1, 1854; Shusha, Shusha Uyezd, Shamakhi Governorate, Imperial Russia
- Died: June 30, 1905 (aged 51); Chita, Zabaykalsky Krai, Imperial Russia
- Spouse: Sarah (Sitara) Khanım Qajar (Ismailova)
- Children: Shamsaddin Mirza (23 July 1895 - 1979); Uveis Mirza (22 December 1896 - 14 April 1931); Izzet Khanum; Murad Mirza
- Military career
- Allegiance: Russian Empire
- Branch: Cavalry
- Service years: 1875 — 1905
- Rank: Lieutenant Colonel
- Unit: Cavalry
- Conflicts: Russo-Turkish War (1877–1878); Russo-Japanese War
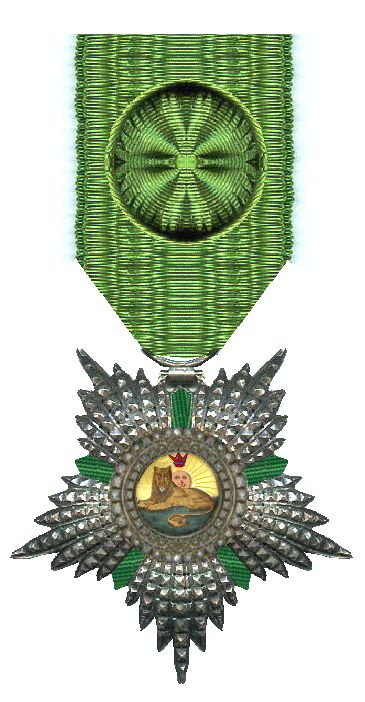
- Awards

Ali Qulu Mirza Qajar (Russian: Али-Кули-Мирза Каджар, Azerbaijani: Əliqulu Mirzə Qacar; 2 May 1854 in Shusha, Shusha Uyezd, Shamakhi Governorate, Imperial Russia – 1905 in Chita, Zabaykalsky Krai, Imperial Russia) was a prince of Iran's Qajar dynasty, and a decorated Imperial Russian military commander, holding the rank of lieutenant colonel.

== Early life ==
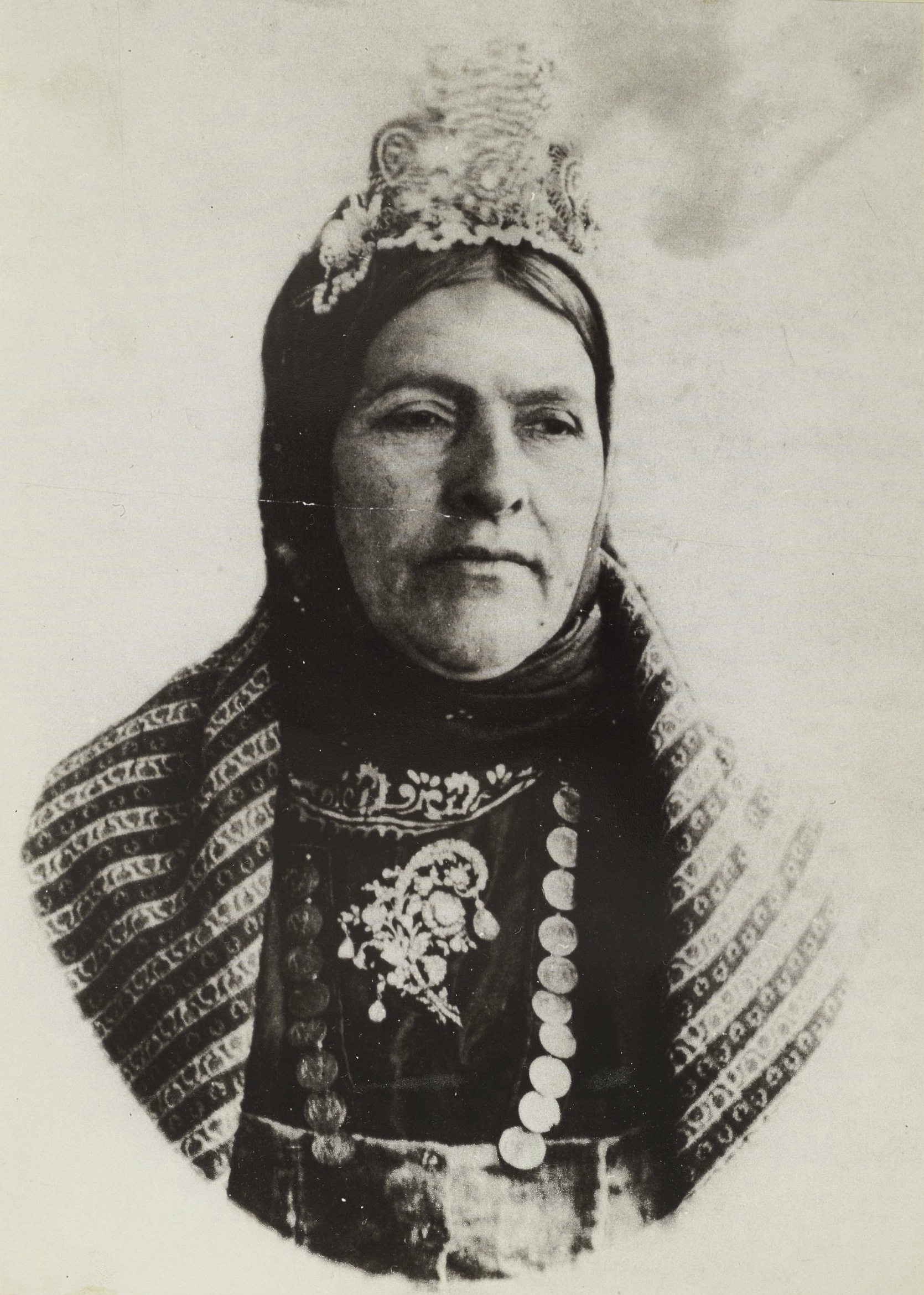
Kuchek Barda Khanom, mother of Ali Qulu Mirza Qajar.

Aligulu Mirza was born in 1854 in the city of Shusha to Bahman Mirza and his 5th wife Kuchek Barda Khanum as his father's 13th son. He was brought up in the house of his parents and later sent to Tiflis Cadet Corps to study military. After graduating from the Tbilisi Corps, on March 24, 1875, he entered the service as a cornet with enrollment in the army cavalry and appointment to be included in Caucasian army. On October 27, 1875, he was assigned to the 164th Zakatala Infantry Regiment.

== Career ==
=== Russo-Turkish war of 1877-1878 ===
He took part in the Russian-Turkish war of 1877-1878 and was drafted to the Caucasus Campaign, participating in several battles and battles: on April 12 his regiment crossed the Choloki River, and the next day he took part in the battle at Mukha-Estate. On April 29, he joined the attack to capture Khutsubani, and on May 16, in the occupation of the Sameba Heights and in the battle near the village of Zeniti. On May 29, he participated in the construction of batteries of the Tsikhisdziri fortifications. On January 18, 1878, he took part in the second attack on the Tsikhisdziri. However during this attack he was wounded in the left hand. He was awarded the Order of St. Anna, 4th degree, with the inscription "For Bravery" for distinction against the Turks, on February 10, 1878, and on April 25, 1878, he was promoted to the rank of lieutenant.

=== Career after the war ===
He was part of the army cavalry in the Caucasian army, but later was transferred to the 17th Severskaya Dragoon Regiment on June 29, 1878, according to the newspaper Russky Invalid dated 1 July 1878. According to the “List and certification of Persian princes serving in the troops of the Caucasian Military District” compiled on March 16, 1886, he was described as person with very good morality, diligent in service and having a good faith. From 1886 he commanded various squadrons of the regiment until 1893, when he was sent to the Cavalry Officer School. He was graduated and promoted to captain in 1895.

He was transferred to the 51st Chernigov Dragoon Regiment on September 18, 1896, in the city of Oryol. There he was promoted to lieutenant colonel with seniority in 1903. He was transferred to the 51st Nezhinsky Regiment in Yelets after the promotion and became their second-in-command, later being transferred to 52nd Nezhinsky Dragoon Regiment.

He was promoted from lieutenant to major.

== Death ==
When the Russo-Japanese war broke out in 1904, his wife Sara asked from him to retire because of a serious heart condition and not to go to war. However, he rejected this proposal saying "a sick person should have retired long ago. If I retreat now, they will say that I was afraid to go to war" and went to war. This military campaign was his last. In 1905, during the Siege of Port Arthur, he was seriously wounded. He died in a hospital in the city of Chita, from where his body was taken to the Caucasus. On this occasion, the newspaper Tercüman wrote on February 18, 1905:

Director of the Red Cross Society, Her Highness Empress Maria Feodorovna found it necessary to deliver the body of Lieutenant Colonel Prince Ali Qulu Mirza Qajar at the expense of the Red Cross to the Caucasus's Yevlakh station.

Ali Qulu Mirza was buried next to his father Bahman Mirza Qajar in Bahman Mirza Qajar Mausoleum in the city of Barda.

== Awards ==
- Order of Saint Anna 4th class (1886)
- Medal "In memory of the Russian-Turkish war of 1877-1878"
- Order of Saint Stanislaus 3rd class
- Order of Saint Stanislaus 2nd class
- Order of Saint Anne 3rd class
- Order of Saint Vladimir 4th class
- Order of Noble Bukhara
- Order of the Lion and the Sun

== Family ==
He was married to Sara (Sittara) Begüm (née Ismailova) daughter of the merchant Aga-Ali Alesker Ismailov. Received a European education. She was fluent Azerbaijani, French, Persian and Russian. The couple had three sons and one daughter:

- Shamsaddin Mirza Qajar (23 July 1895 - 1979) — graduated from the Imperial School of Law in 1917. After returning from Petrograd, he remained to live and work in Tbilisi, where he died at the age of 85 in 1979. In 1951, he wrote his memoirs about his father "He will return", which were published in 1990 in the monthly literary and art magazine "Literary Azerbaijan". Married Aliya Qajar (daughter of Amir Kazem Mirza, his uncle) and later to Nina Mikhailovna Andriasova.
  - Izzet Khanum (b. 1924)
- Owais Mirza (22 December 1896, Tbilisi - 14 April 1931, Baku) — transferred from the Imperial School of Law to the Petrograd Polytechnic Institute. Later he had worked in Baku as a radio engineer in the editorial office of the Kommunist newspaper. Died of tuberculosis in 1931. Married Tamara Zizikashvili.
  - Chingiz Qajar (b. 1929, Baku - d. 12 June 2021, Baku), Doctor of Physical and Mathematical Sciences, Honored Worker of Science of the Azerbaijan SSR
  - Leyla Qajar (b. 1927)
- Murad Mirza Qajar (died in childhood)
- Izzet Khanum (died in childhood)

== See also ==
- Amir Kazim Mirza Qajar
