= Qajar dynasty =

Iranian royal dynasty of Turkic origin (1789–1925)

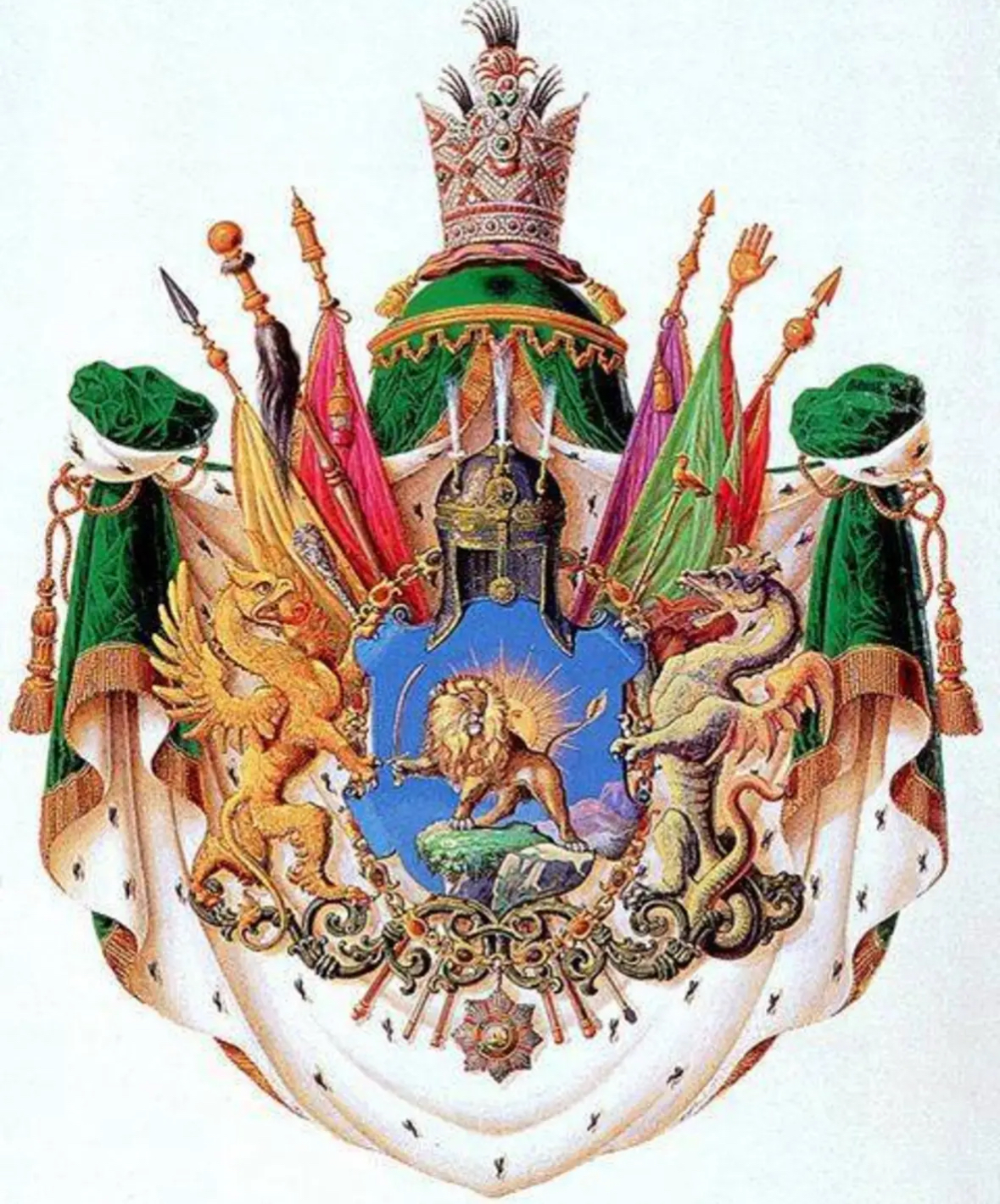
- Coat of arms of the Qajar dynasty
- Parent house: Qajar tribe; Qovanlu
- Country: Qajar Iran
- Origin: Astarabad, Iran
- Founded: 1789
- Founder: Agha Mohammad Khan Qajar
- Current head: Prince Mohammad Hassan Mirza II
- Final ruler: Ahmad Shah Qajar
- Titles: Shah of Iran
- Connected families: Pahlavi dynasty
- Traditions: Twelver Shia Islam
- Deposition: 1925
- Cadet branches: Amirsoleimani, Bahmani, Farmanfarmaian/Farman Farma

The Qajar dynasty (Persian: دودمان قاجار, romanized: Dudemân-e Qâjâr) (Note: Also romanized as Ghajar, Kadjar, Qachar etc.) is a formerly Iranian aristocratic dynasty that gained prominence with the rise of Shahverdi Sultan in the early 16th century as heads of the Turkoman Qajar tribe of the Qizilbash confederacy. The dynasty ruled Iran from 1789 until 1925, beginning with the Unification of Iran (1779–1796) by Agha Mohammad Khan Qajar (r. 1789–1797).

The Russian branch of the Qajar dynasty belonged to the Russian Nobility and was given the titles Prince Persidskii and Princess Persidskaya by the Tsar in the 19th century, many of whose members had held senior positions in the Imperial Russian Army, such as Alexander Petrovich Reza Qoli Mirza Qajar.

The dynasty's effective rule in Iran ended in 1925 when Iran's Majlis, convening as a constituent assembly on 12 December 1925, declared Reza Shah, a former brigadier-general of the Persian Cossack Brigade, as the new shah of Iran, beginning the reign of the Pahlavi dynasty.

== Head of the Qajar tribe ==
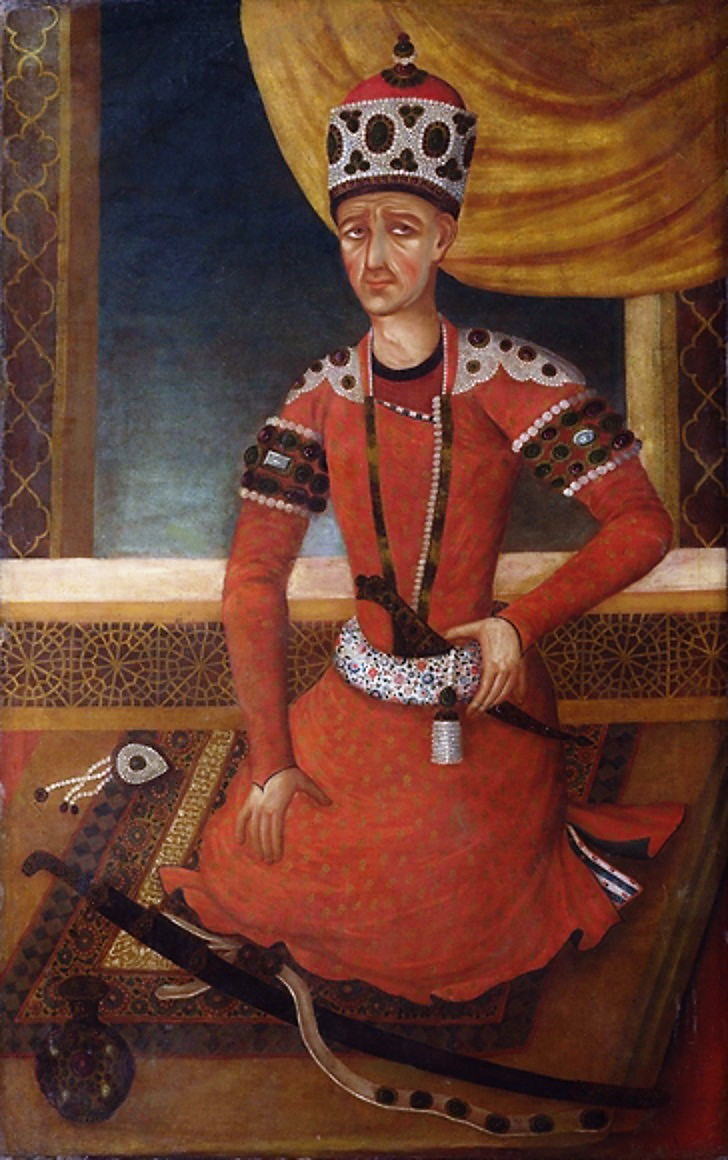
Agha Mohammad Khan Qajar Founder of the Qajar dynasty.

The Qajar dynasty, as the ruling lineage, held prominent positions as tribal heads long before establishing imperial rule, leveraging their military prowess and tribal alliances to unify the country amid post-Safavid chaos.

During the establishment of the Safavid Empire, when Ismail led the 7,000 tribal soldiers on his successful expedition from Erzincan to Shirvan in 1500/01, a contingent of Qajars was among them. After this, they emerged as a prominent group within the Qizilbash confederacy, who were made up of Turkoman warriors and served as the main force of the Safavid military. Despite being smaller than other tribes, the Qajars continued to play a major role in important events during the 16th century.

The immediate ancestor of the Qajar monarchs, Shah Qoli Khan of the Quvanlu of Ganja, married into the Quvanlu Qajars of Astarabad. His son, Fath-Ali Khan (born c. 1685–1693) was a renowned military commander during the rule of the Safavid shahs Soltan Hoseyn and Tahmasp II. He was killed in 1726. Fath Ali Khan's son Mohammad Hasan Khan (1722–1758) was the father of Agha Mohammad Khan and Hossein Qoli Khan (Jahansouz Shah), father of "Baba Khan," the future Fath-Ali Shah Qajar. Mohammad Hasan Khan was killed on the orders of Karim Khan of the Zand dynasty.

== List of Qajar monarchs ==
No.	Shah	Portrait	Reigned from	Reigned until	Reign duration (Note: Full years reigned)	Tughra
1	Mohammad Khan Qajar		1789	17 June 1797	8 years	
2	Fat′h-Ali Shah Qajar		17 June 1797	23 October 1834	37 years	
3	Mohammad Shah Qajar		23 October 1834	5 September 1848	13 years	
4	Naser al-Din Shah Qajar		5 September 1848	1 May 1896	47 years	
5	Mozaffar ad-Din Shah Qajar		1 May 1896	3 January 1907	10 years	
6	Mohammad Ali Shah Qajar		3 January 1907	16 July 1909	2 years	
7	Ahmad Shah Qajar		16 July 1909	31 October 1925	16 years	
Qajar dynasty			1789	31 October 1925	136 years	

== List of heir presumptive of the Qajar dynasty ==
No.	Portrait	Name	duration
I		Ahmad Shah	1925-1930
II		Mohammad Hassan Mirza	1930-1943
III		Hamid Mirza	1943–1988
IV		Mohammad Hassan Mirza II	1988

== Imperial family ==
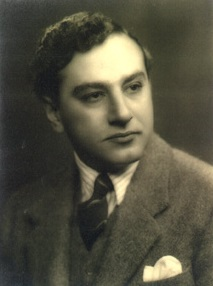
Hamid Mirza, heir presumptive and head of the Qajar dynasty from 1975 to 1988

The Qajar Imperial Family in exile is currently headed by the eldest descendant of Mohammad Ali Shah, Sultan Mohammad Ali Mirza Qajar, while the Heir Presumptive to the Qajar throne is Mohammad Hassan Mirza II, the grandson of Mohammad Hassan Mirza, Sultan Ahmad Shah's brother and heir. Mohammad Hassan Mirza died in England in 1943, having proclaimed himself shah in exile in 1930 after the death of his brother in France.

Today, the descendants of the Qajars often identify themselves as such and hold reunions to stay socially acquainted through the Kadjar (Qajar) Family Association, often coinciding with the annual conferences and meetings of the International Qajar Studies Association (IQSA). The Kadjar (Qajar) Family Association was founded for a third time in 2000. Two earlier family associations were stopped because of political pressure. The offices and archives of IQSA are housed at the International Museum for Family History in Eijsden.

=== Qajar dynasty since 1925 ===
Heads of the Qajar imperial family

The headship of the Imperial Family is inherited by the eldest male descendant of Mohammad Ali Shah.

- Sultan Ahmad Shah Qajar (1925–1930)
- Fereydoun Mirza (1930–1975)
- Sultan Hamid Mirza (1975–1988)
- Sultan Mahmoud Mirza (1988)
- Sultan Ali Mirza Qajar (1988–2011)
- Sultan Mohammad Ali Mirza (2011–present)

Extended Family

- Qajar descendants of Jwamer Agha, Princesses of Qajar, great-great or great-great-great grandchildren of Naser al-Din Shah Qajar.

== Titles and styles ==
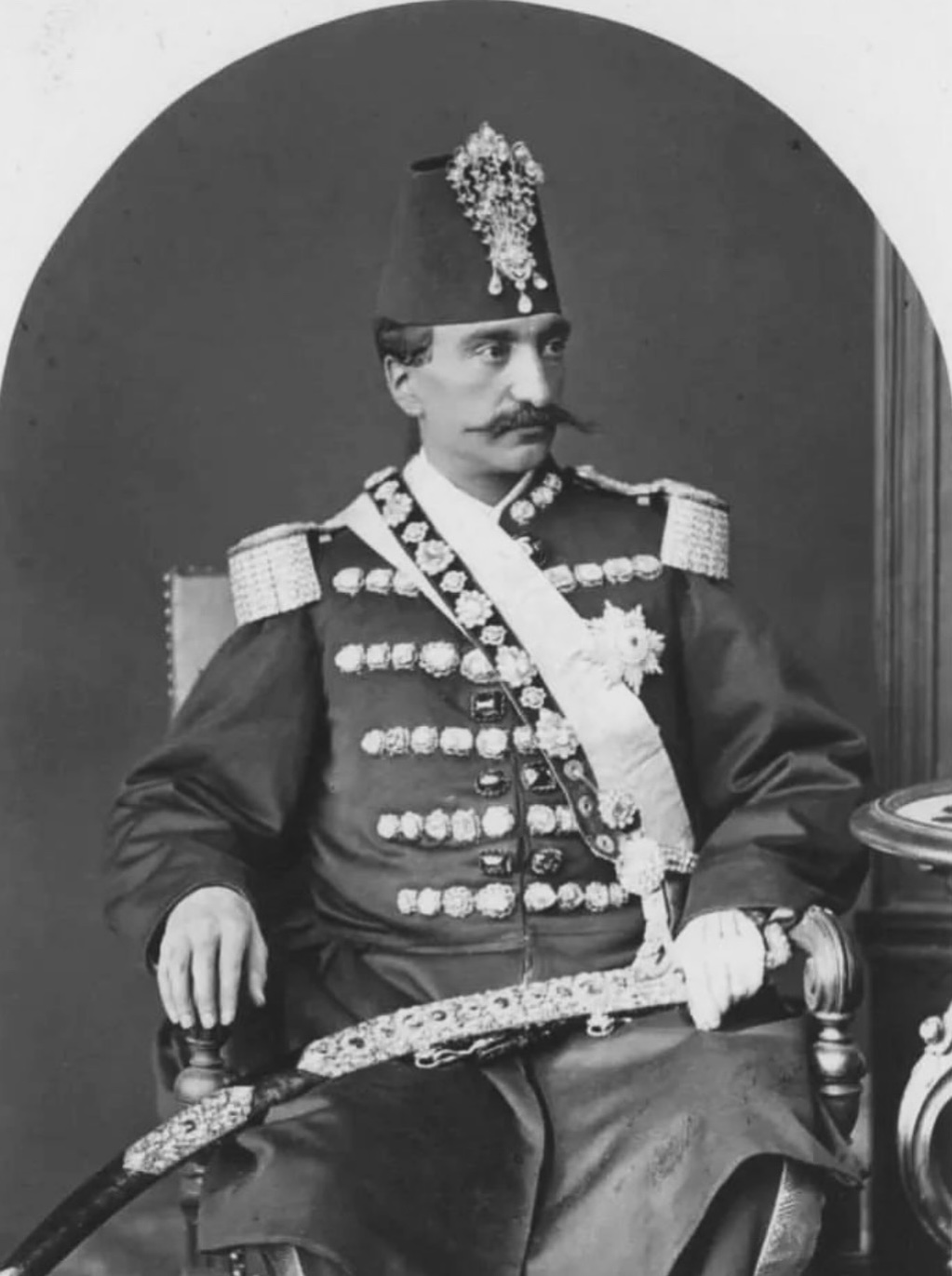
Naser al-Din Shah, the fourth Qajar shah, notably used the title "Pivot of the Universe" (Qebleh-ye Alam)

The shah and his consort were styled Imperial Majesty. Their children were addressed as Imperial Highness, while male-line grandchildren were entitled to the lower style of Highness; all of them bore the title of Shahzadeh or Shahzadeh Khanoum.

The Qajar Shahs also adopted grandiose titles that reflected their perceived divine authority and centrality in the Persian monarchy. These titles were not merely honorific but served to legitimize their rule amidst internal and external challenges, blending pre-Islamic, Islamic-Shi’i, and nomadic elements of Persian governance. Among these titles were;

- Shahanshah of Iran
- Zell'ollah (Shadow of God [on earth])
- Qebleh-ye 'ālam (Pivot of the Universe)
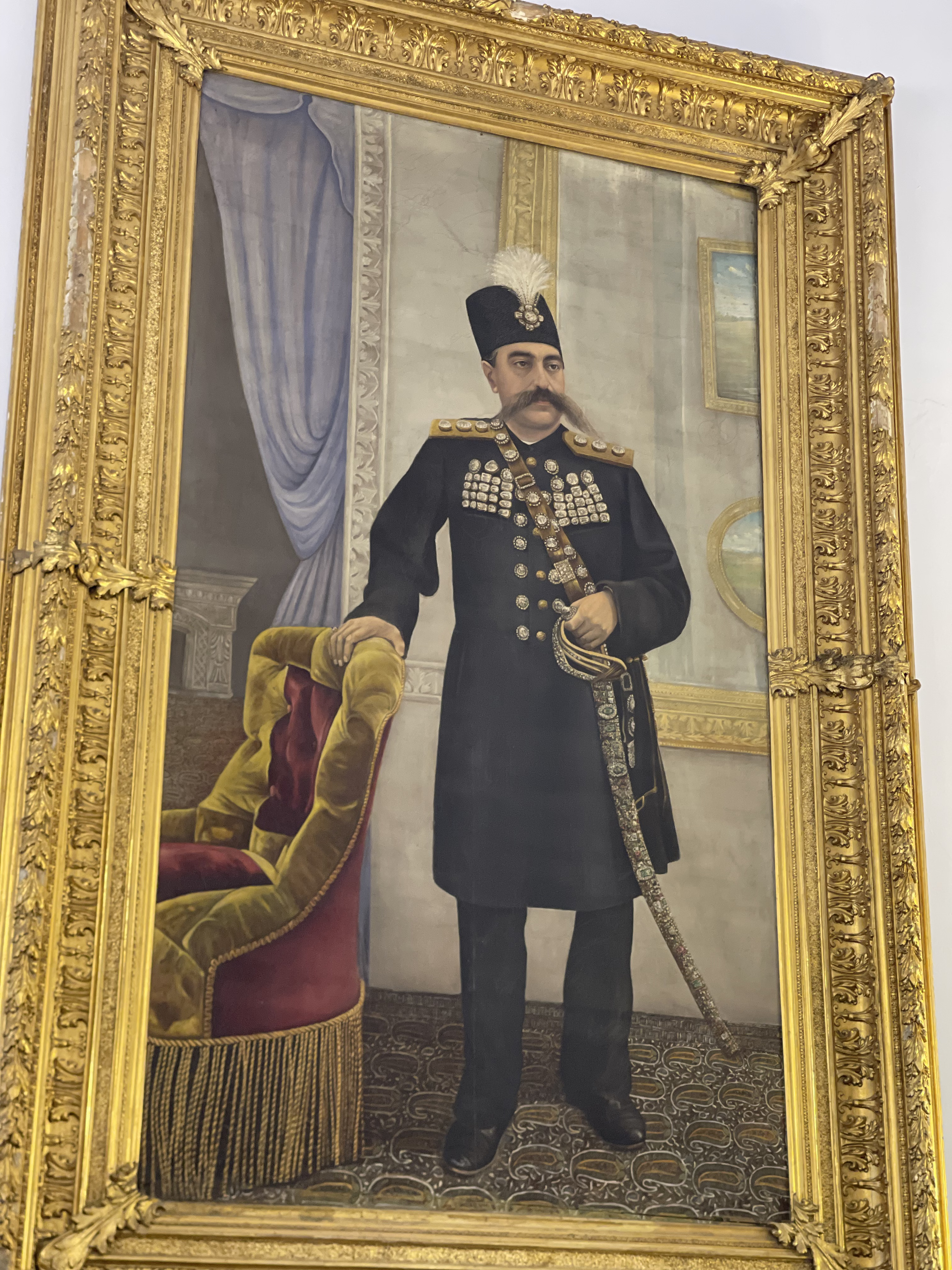
To honour Mozaffar ad-Din Shah for signing the Persian Constitution of 1906, the slogan Adl-e Moẓaffar was inscribed on Baharestan Palace.

== Notable members ==
=== Politics ===
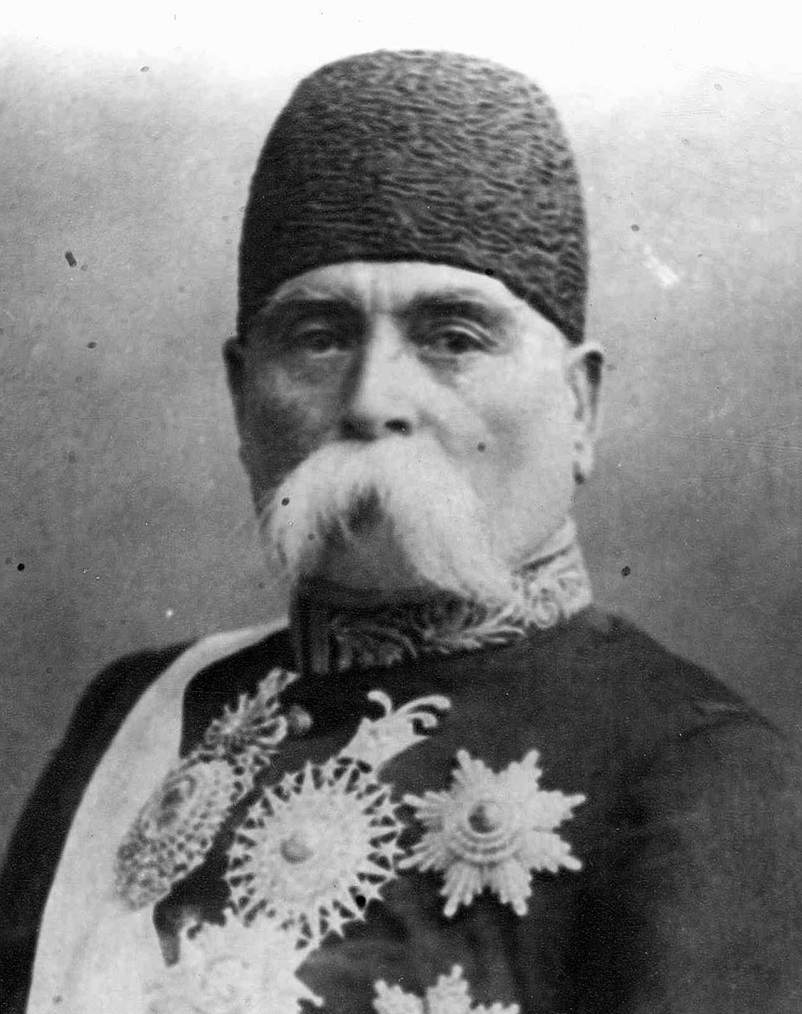
Abdol Majid Mirza (1845–1927), 14th and 20th prime minister of Iran

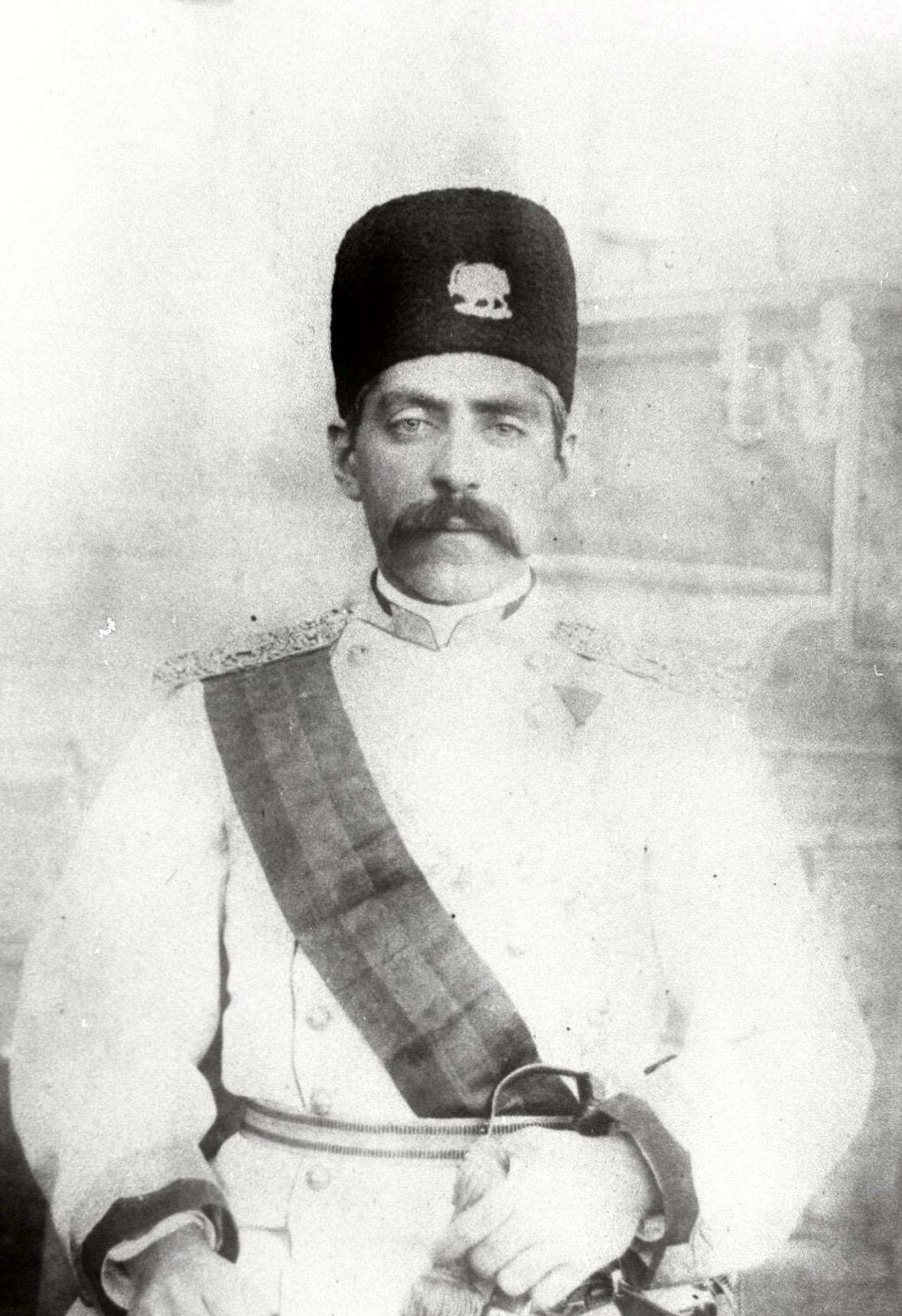
Abdol-Hossein Farman Farma, prime minister of Iran from 25 December 1915 to 1 March 1916

- Princess Turan Amirsoleimani, she was the third wife of Reza Shah, with whom she had one son Gholam Reza Pahlavi
- Prince Abdol-Hossein Farman Farma
- Mohammad Mosaddegh, prime minister of Iran and nephew of Prince Abdol Hossein Mirza Farmanfarma.
- Prince Firouz Nosrat-ed-Dowleh III, son of Prince Abdol-Hossein Farmanfarma, foreign minister of Iran
- Hossein Khan Sardar, last ruler of the Erivan Khanate administrative division
- Prince Majd ed-Dowleh Amirsoleimani, one of Iran's most influential politicians of his time. He was a key court figure throughout the reigns of several Qajar Shahs, including Nasser al-Din Shah, Mozaffar ad-Din Shah, Mohammad Ali Shah, and Ahmad Shah.
- Amir-Abbas Hoveyda, Iranian economist and politician, prime minister of Iran from 1965 to 1977, a Qajar descendant on his maternal side
- Ali Amini, prime minister of Iran
- Prince Iraj Eskandari, Iranian communist politician
- Princess Maryam Farman Farmaian, Iranian communist politician, founder of the women's section of the Tudeh Party of Iran
- Ardeshir Zahedi, Iranian diplomat, Qajar descendant on his maternal side.
- Prince Sabar Farmanfarmaian, health minister in Mosaddeq cabinet
- Abdol Hossein Sardari, Consul General at the Iranian Embassy in Paris 1940–1945; helped and saved the lives of Jews in danger of deportation by issuing them with Iranian passports. A Qajar Qoyunlu and through his mother a grandson of Princess Malekzadeh Khanoum Ezzat od-Doleh, the sister of Nasser ed-Din Shah.
- Aga Khan III, President of the League of Nations from 1937 to 1938, one of the founders and the first president of the All-India Muslim League and the 48th Imam of the Nizari Ismaili Muslims.

=== Military ===
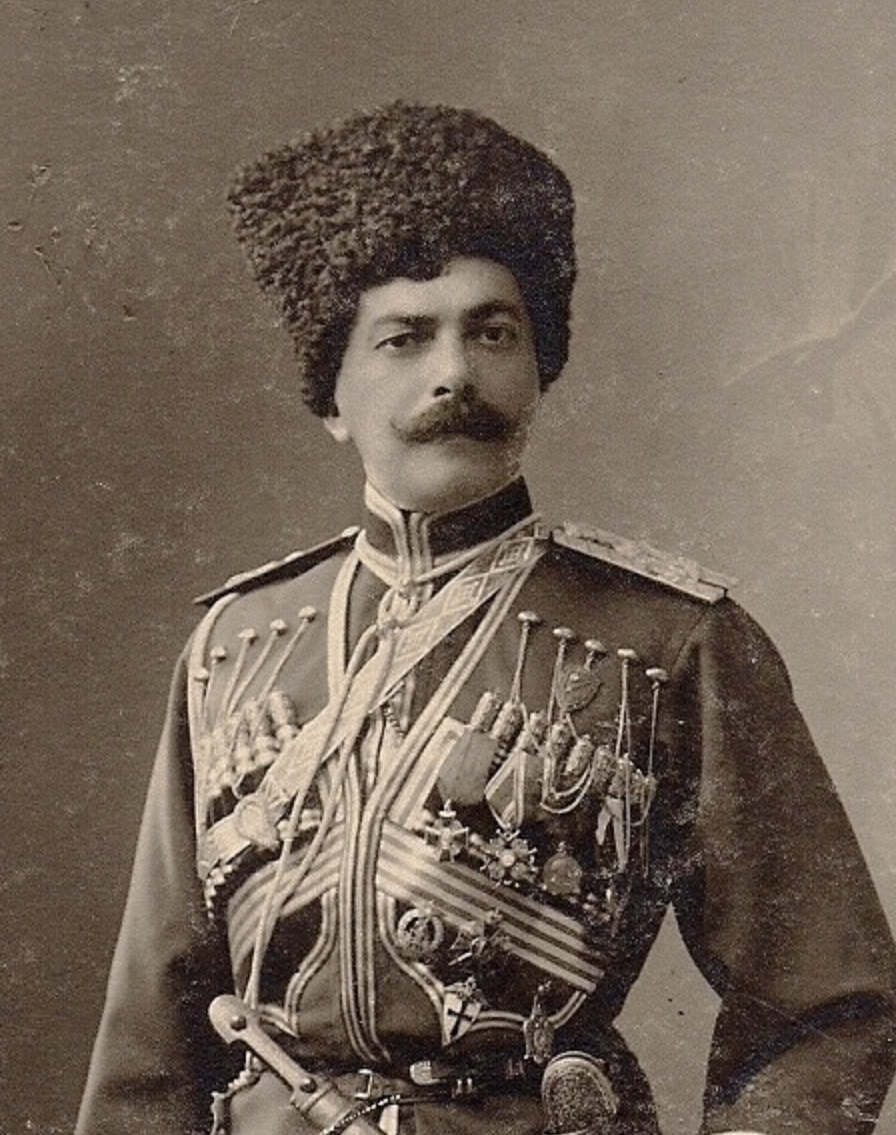
Aleksander Petrovich Reza Qoli Mirza (1869–1941)

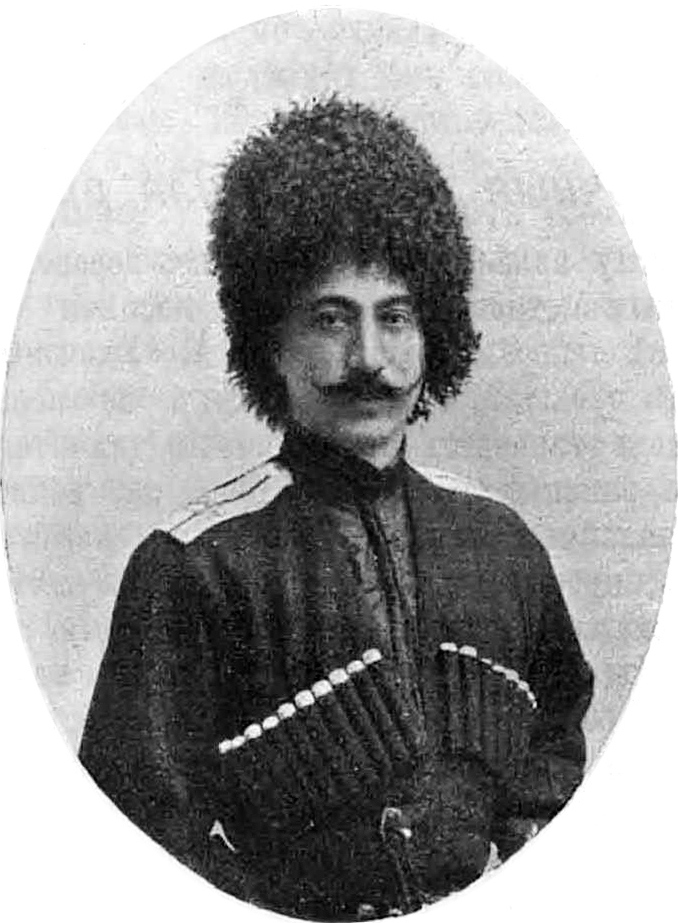
Feyzullah Mirza Qajar (1872–1920)

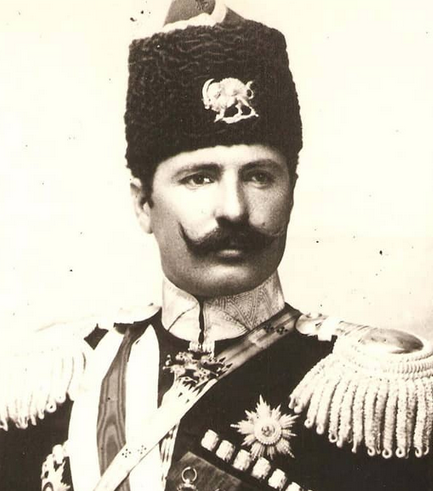
Amanullah Mirza Jahanbani (1869–1912)

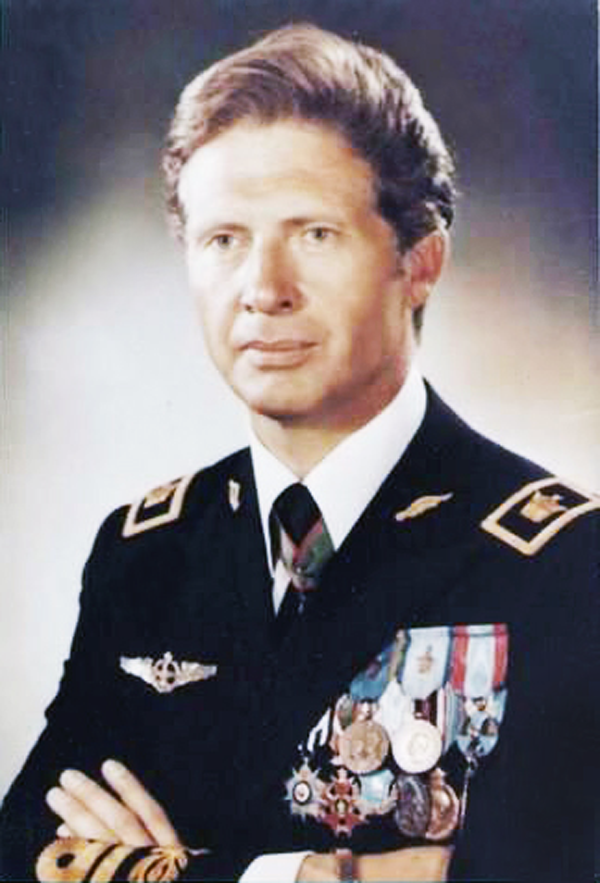
Nader Jahanbani (1928–1979)
- Prince Amanullah Mirza Qajar, Imperial Russian, Azerbaijani, and Iranian military commander
- Prince Feyzullah Mirza Qajar, Imperial Russian and Azerbaijani (ADR) military commander
- Prince Ali Qulu Mirza Qajar, Imperial Russian military commander, having the rank of Lieutenant Colonel
- Prince Aleksander Reza Qoli Mirza Qajar, Imperial Russian military leader, commander of Yekaterinburg (1918)
- Prince Amanullah Jahanbani, senior Iranian general
- Nader Jahanbani, general and vice-deputy chief of the Imperial Iranian Air Force
- Brig. General Changiz Voshmgir, deputy commander-in-chief of the Ground Forces of the Imperial Iranian Army, son of Hassan Khan Shoja Saltaneh & Bashir-ol-Moluk

=== Religion ===
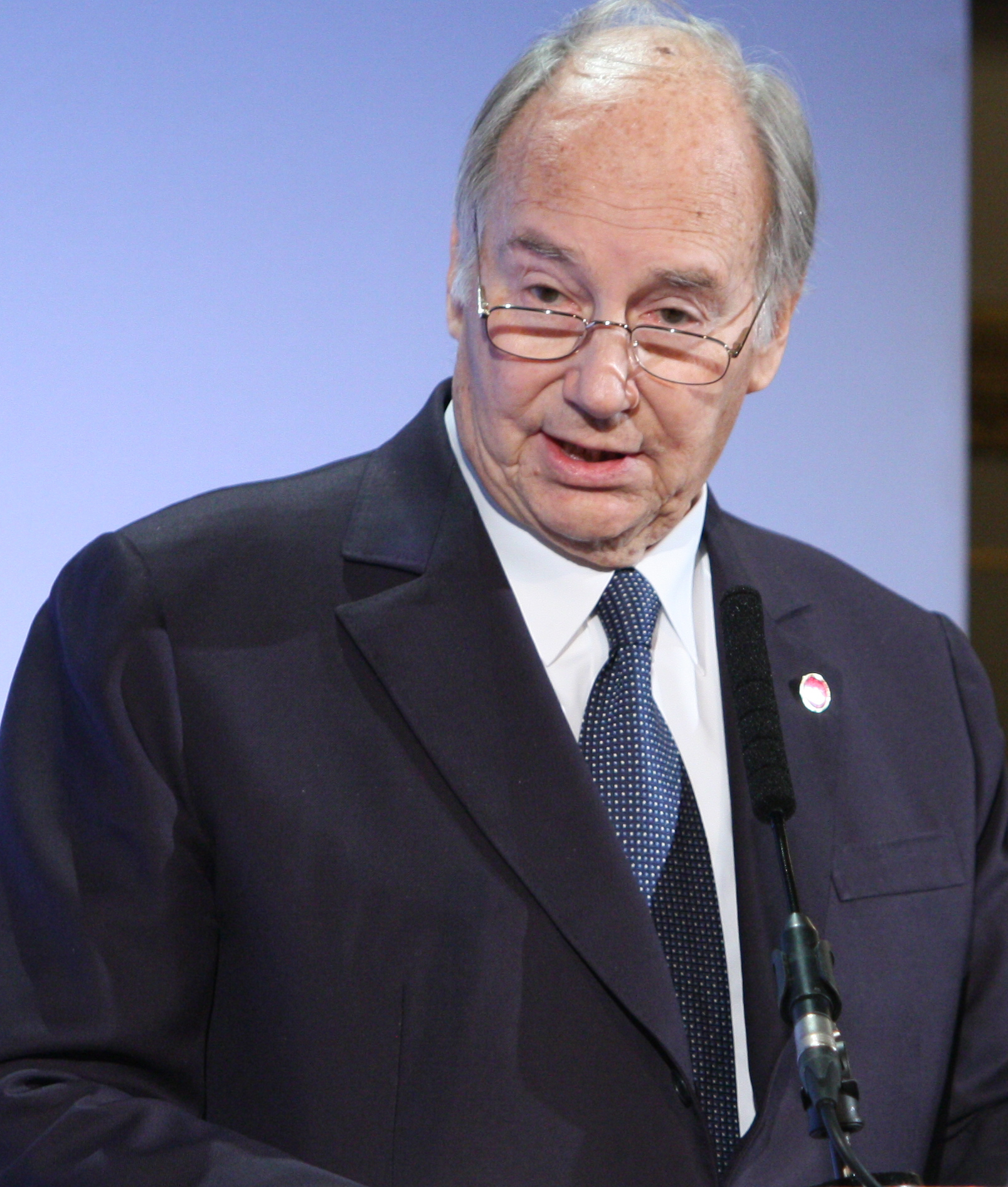
Aga Khan IV, The titles of Prince and Princess are used by the Aga Khans and their children by virtue of their descent from Shah Fath Ali Shah of the Qajar dynasty. The title was officially recognised by the British government in 1938.

- Aga Khan IV, the 49th Imam of Nizari Ismailism, a denomination of Isma'ilism within Shia Islam.

=== Women's rights ===
- Princess Tadj al-Saltaneh, daughter of Naser-din-Shah, co-founder of the first Iranian women's rights movement Anjoman Naswan, author of a memoir, painter
- Princess Mohtaram Eskandari, an intellectual and pioneering figure in Iranian women's movement.
- Iran Teymourtash (Légion d'honneur), journalist, editor and publisher of the newspaper Rastakhiz, founder of an association for helping destitute women. Daughter of court minister Abdolhossein Teymourtash and through both her maternal grandparents a Qajar.

=== Literature ===
Princess Taj-al-Saltaneh Qajar, daughter of Naser-din-Shah, First Iranian woman to write a memoir, co-founder of the first Iranian women's rights movement Anjoman Naswan, author of a memoir, painter

- Prince Iraj Mirza, Iranian poet and translator
- Sadegh Hedayat, a Qajar descendant through the female line
- Anvar Khamei, the Iranian economist, politician, and sociologist.
- Gowhar Qajar, Iranian female poet.

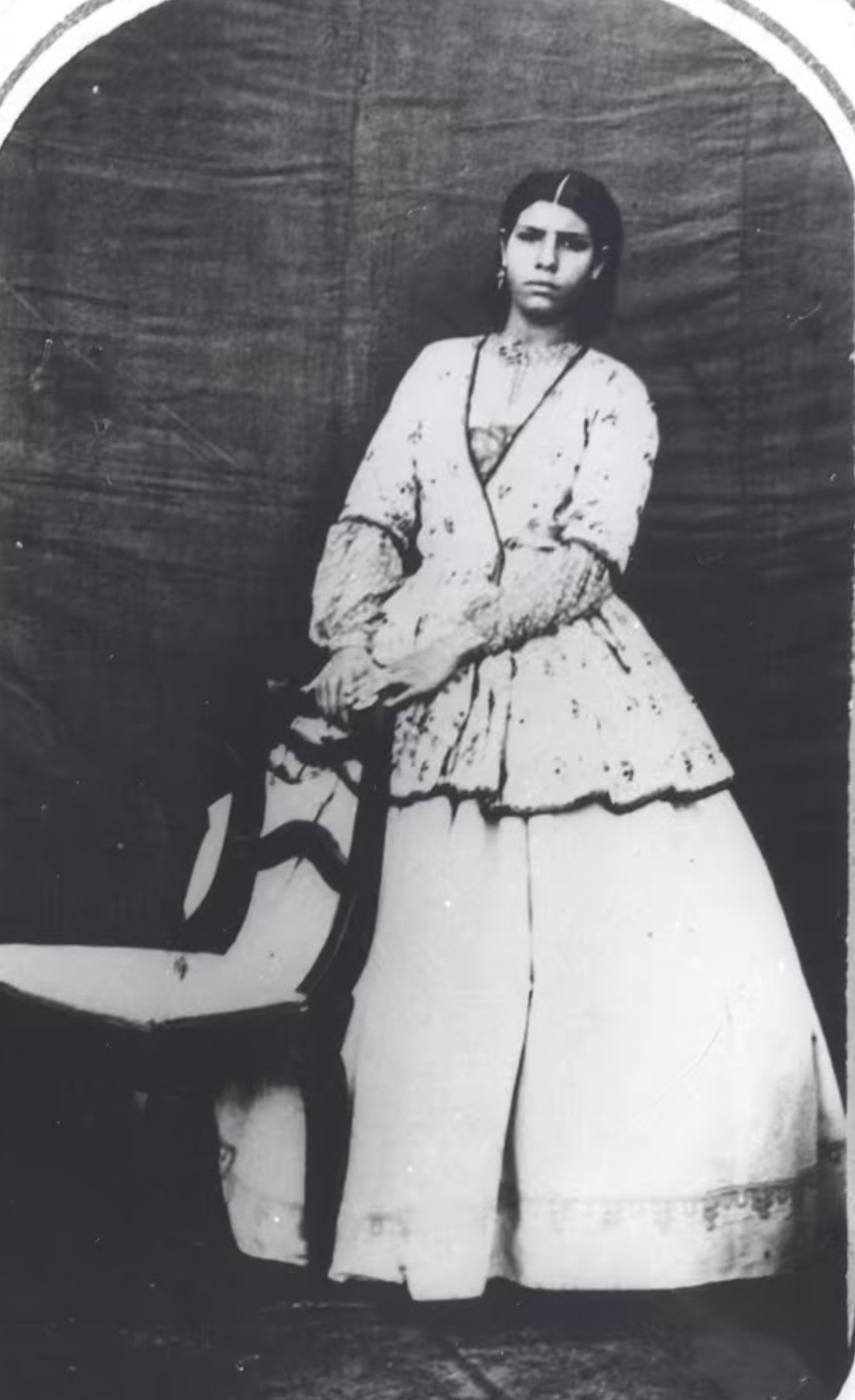
Gowhar Qajar, female poet and astronomer.

=== Entertainment ===
- Sepand Amirsoleimani, Iranian actor.
- Kamand Amirsoleimani, Iranian actress.
- Gholam-Hossein Banan, Iranian musician and singer, Qajar descendant on his maternal side.

== Former residences ==
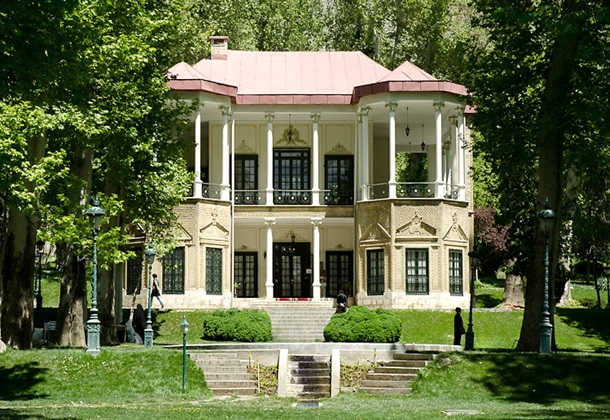
The last Qajar monarch's Pavilion in the Niavaran Complex, Tehran.

The Qajar dynasty is particularly noted for its extensive construction of royal residences across Iran, which served as the principal seats of power, diplomatic reception, and court life. The most prominent of these were the Golestan and Niavaran Palace Complexes in Tehran.

- Ruby Palace
- Naseri Palace
- Sahebgharaniyeh Palace
- Negarestan Palace
- Ferdows Garden
- Masoudieh Mansion
- Ein ad-Dowleh Mansion
- Qajar Palace
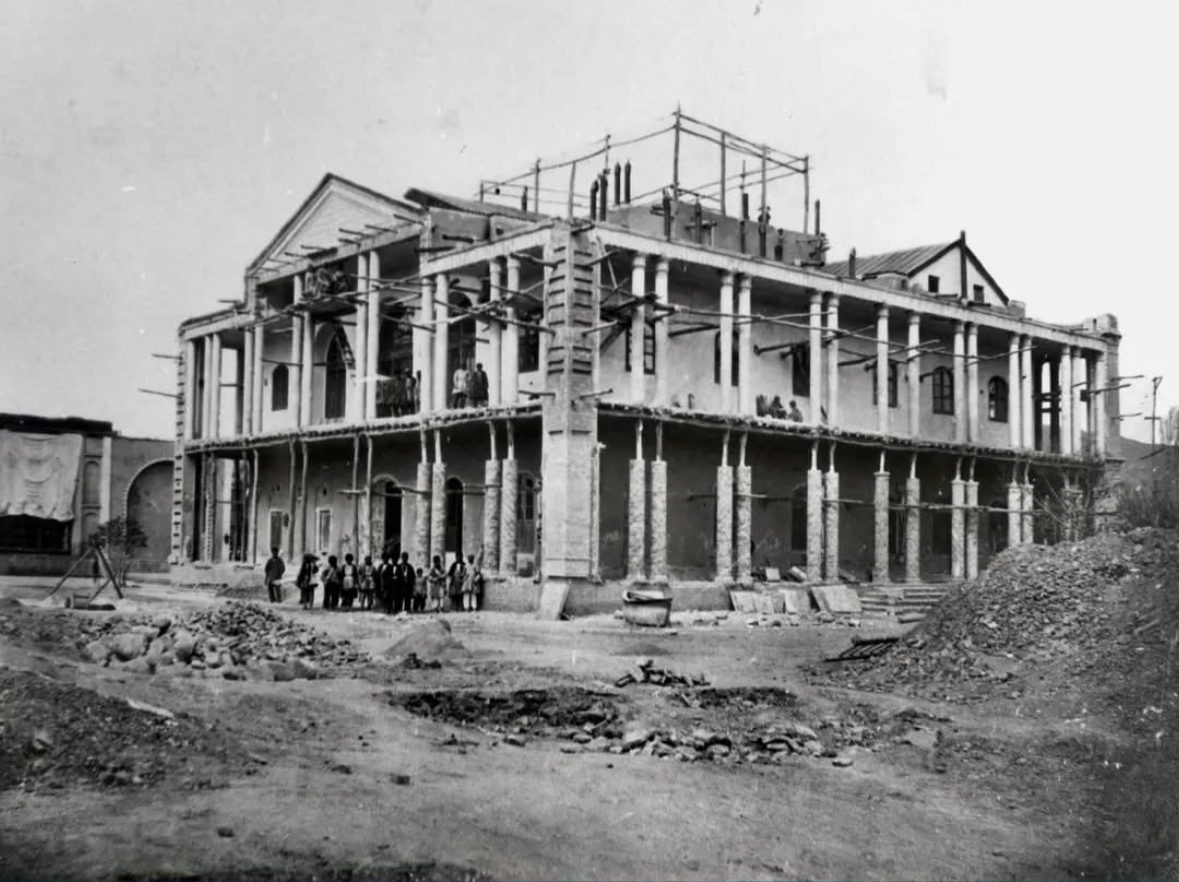
Construction of the Shams-ol-Emareh, ordered by Naser al-Din Shah Qajar, Tabriz.

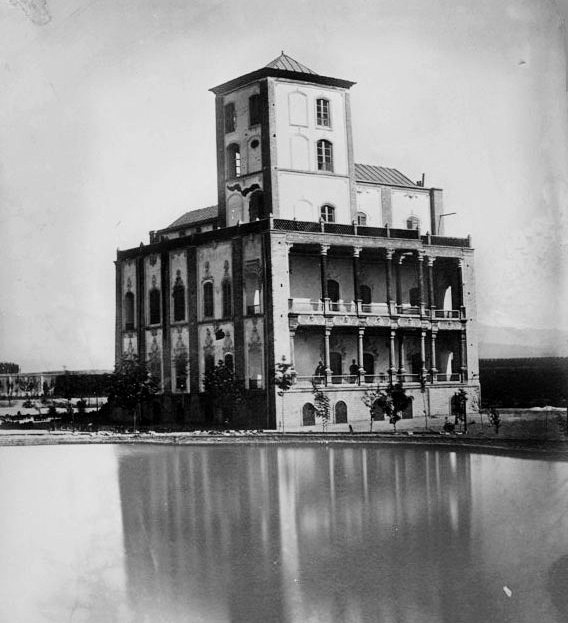
The mansion of Mass'oud Mirza Zell-e Soltan in Baharestan (district), Tehran.

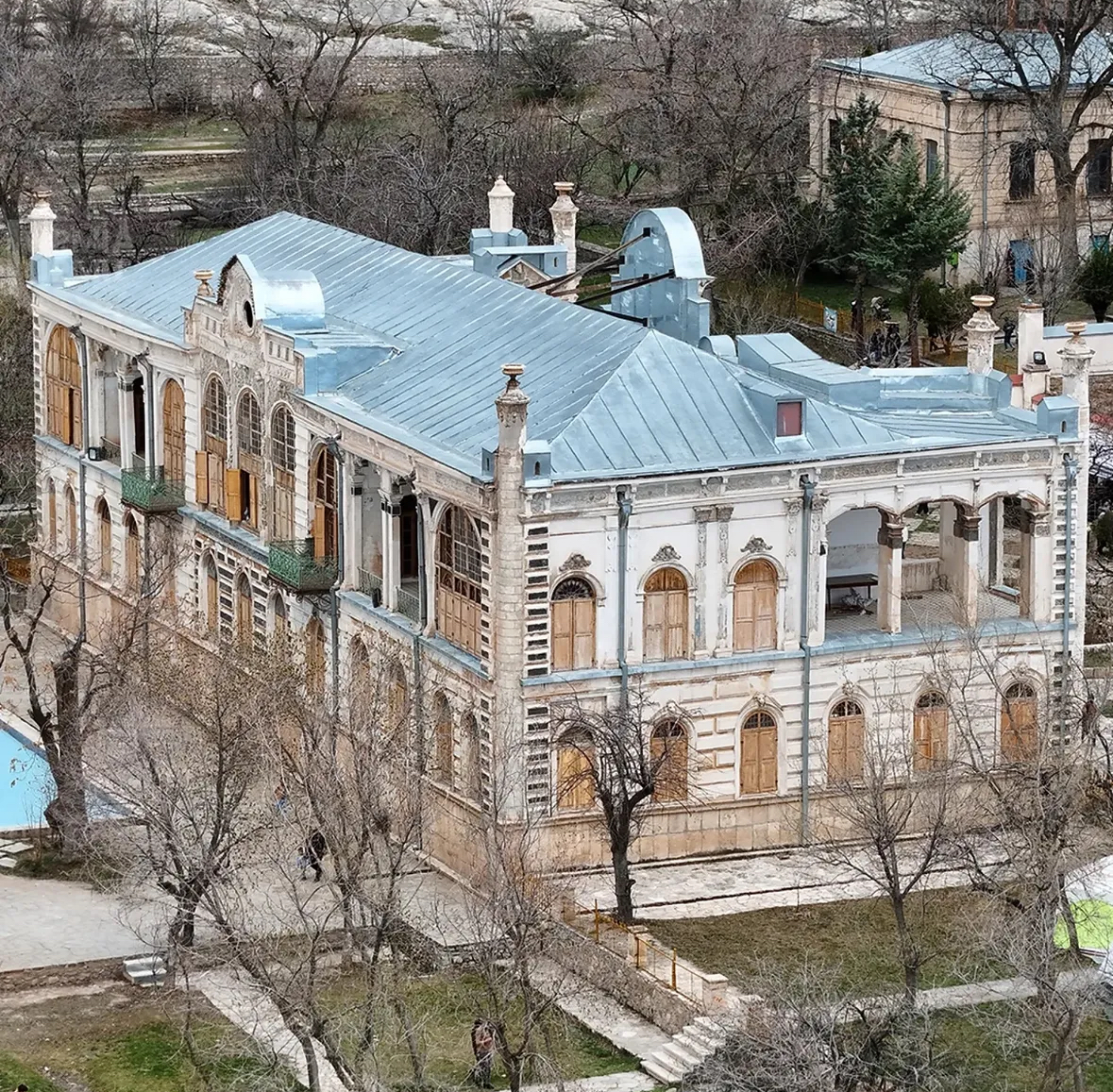
Baqcheh Jooq Palace

== Monuments ==
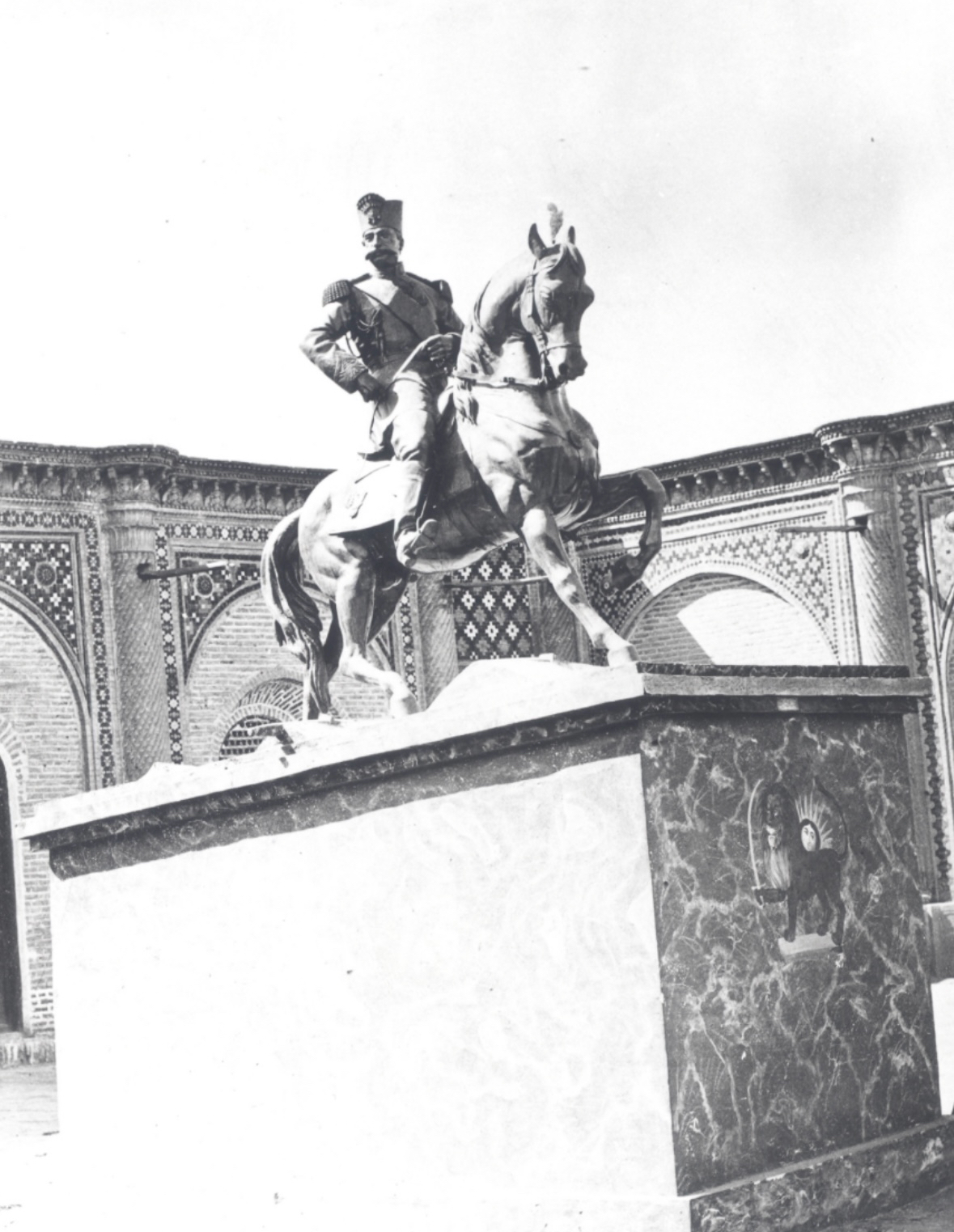
The Equestrian Statue of Naser al-Din Shah, inaugurated in 1888

Apart from statues, monuments to the Qajar dynasty include seven rock reliefs, e.g. Fath Ali Shah Inscription in Cheshmeh-Ali, Tangeh-ye Vashi, and Shekl-e Shah.

== See also ==
- Abdolhossein Teymourtash
- Austro-Hungarian military mission in Persia
- Bahmani family
- History of Iran
- History of the Caucasus
- Khanates of the Caucasus
- List of monarchs of Iran
- List of Shia dynasties
- Mirza Kuchik Khan
- Qajar art
- Qajar Iran

== Sources ==
- Atabaki, Touraj (2006). Iran and the First World War: Battleground of the Great Powers. I.B. Tauris. ISBN 978-1860649646.
- Bournoutian, George A. (1980). The Population of Persian Armenia Prior to and Immediately Following its Annexation to the Russian Empire: 1826–1832. Nationalism and social change in Transcaucasi. The Wilson Center, Kennan Institute for Advanced Russian Studies.
- Bournoutian, George A. (2002). A Concise History of the Armenian People: (from Ancient Times to the Present) (2 ed.). Mazda Publishers. ISBN 978-1568591414.
- Caton, M. (1988). "BANĀN, ḠOLĀM-ḤOSAYN". Encyclopaedia Iranica.
- Dowling, Timothy C. (2014). Russia at War: From the Mongol Conquest to Afghanistan, Chechnya, and Beyond [2 volumes]. ABC-CLIO. ISBN 978-1598849486.
- Fisher, William Bayne; Avery, P.; Hambly, G. R. G; Melville, C. (1991). The Cambridge History of Iran. Vol. 7. Cambridge: Cambridge University Press. ISBN 978-0521200950.
- Hitchins, Keith (1998). "EREKLE II". EREKLE II – Encyclopaedia Iranica. Encyclopaedia Iranica. Vol. VIII, Fasc. 5. pp. 541–542.
- Holt, P.M.; Lambton, Ann K.S.; Lewis, Bernard (1977). The Cambridge History of Islam. Cambridge: Cambridge University Press. ISBN 978-0521291361.
- Kettenhofen, Erich; Bournoutian, George A.; Hewsen, Robert H. (1998). "EREVAN". Encyclopaedia Iranica. Vol. VIII, Fasc. 5. pp. 542–551.
- Kohn, George C. (2006). Dictionary of Wars. Infobase Publishing. ISBN 978-1438129167.
- Mikaberidze, Alexander (2011). Conflict and Conquest in the Islamic World: A Historical Encyclopedia. Vol. 1. ABC-CLIO. ISBN 978-1598843361.
- Mikaberidze, Alexander (2015). Historical Dictionary of Georgia (2nd ed.). Rowman & Littlefield. ISBN 978-1442241466.
- Gvosdev, Nikolas K.: Imperial policies and perspectives towards Georgia: 1760–1819, Macmillan, Basingstoke 2000, ISBN 0-312-22990-9
- Lang, David M.: The last years of the Georgian Monarchy: 1658–1832, Columbia University Press, New York 1957
- Paidar, Parvin (1997). Women and the Political Process in Twentieth-Century Iran. Cambridge: Cambridge University Press. ISBN 9780521595728.
- Perry, John (1991). "The Zand dynasty". The Cambridge History of Iran, Vol. 7: From Nadir Shah to the Islamic Republic. Cambridge: Cambridge University Press. pp. 63–104. ISBN 9780521200950.
- Suny, Ronald Grigor (1994). The Making of the Georgian Nation. Indiana University Press. ISBN 978-0253209153.
- Sümer, Faruk (1978). "Ḳād̲j̲ār". In van Donzel, E.; Lewis, B.; Pellat, Ch. & Bosworth, C. E. (eds.). The Encyclopaedia of Islam, Second Edition. Volume IV: Iran–Kha. Leiden: E. J. Brill. p. 387. ISBN 978-90-04-05745-6. OCLC 758278456.
- Amanat, Abbas (1997). Pivot of the Universe: Nasir Al-Din Shah Qajar and the Iranian Monarchy, 1831–1896. University of California Press. ISBN 978-0-520-08321-9.

— Royal house — Qajar dynasty
Preceded by House of Afsharid; House of Zand	Ruling house of Iran; 1796–1925	Succeeded by House of Pahlavi
