= Amir Kazim Mirza Qajar =

Azerbaijani military commander (1853–1920)

- Azerbaijani: Əmir Kazım mirzə Qovanlı-Qacar
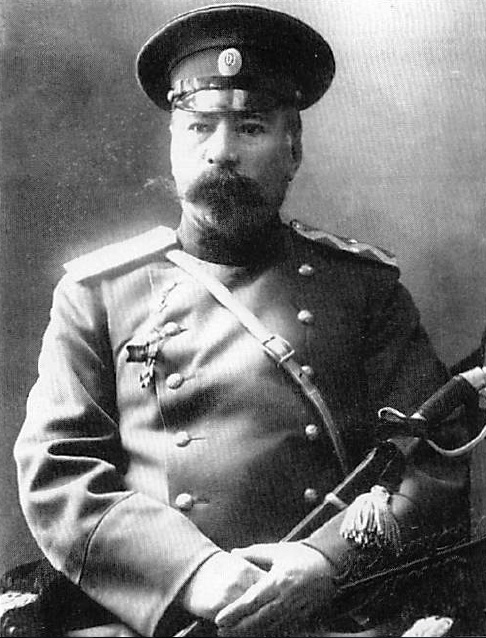
- Born: Amir Kazim Mirza Qajar Bahman Mirza Qajar oglu 1 May 1853; Shusha, Shusha Uyezd, Shamakhi Governorate, Imperial Russia
- Died: 30 June 1920 (aged 67); Ganja, Azerbaijan SSR
- Spouse: Govhar Khanum Alesker Agha gızı
- Children: Davud Mirza (b. 1884); Leyla Khanum (b. 1886); Ziba Khanum (b. 1889); Aliyya Khanum (b. 1892); Darab Mirza (b. 1902)
- Military career
- Allegiance: Russian Empire (from 1871 to 1909); Azerbaijan Democratic Republic (from 1919 to 1920)
- Branch: Cavalry
- Service years: 1871 – 1920
- Rank: (Russian Empire) Lieutenant general of The Imperial Russian Army (from 1871 to 1909), Cavalry General of The National Army of Azerbaijan Democratic Republic (from 1919 to 1920)
- Unit: Cavalry
- Conflicts: Russo-Turkish War; Russo-Japanese War; 1920 Ganja revolt
- Awards: 3rd Class Order of Saint Vladimir 4th Class Order of Saint Vladimir 2nd Class Ode of Saint Stanislaus 3rd Class Ode of Saint Stanislaus 2nd Class Order of Saint Anne 3rd Class Order of Saint Anne 4th Class Order of Saint Anne Order of the Lion and the Sun Golden Weapon for Bravery

Amir Kazim Mirza Qajar (Azerbaijani: Əmir Kazım mirzə Qovanlı-Qacar; 19 April 1853, in Shusha, Shusha Uyezd, Shamakhi Governorate, Imperial Russia – 30 June 1920, in Ganja, Azerbaijan SSR) was a prince of Iran's Qajar dynasty and a decorated Imperial Russian and Azerbaijani military commander, having the rank of major-general. He was also involved in charity.

== Early life ==
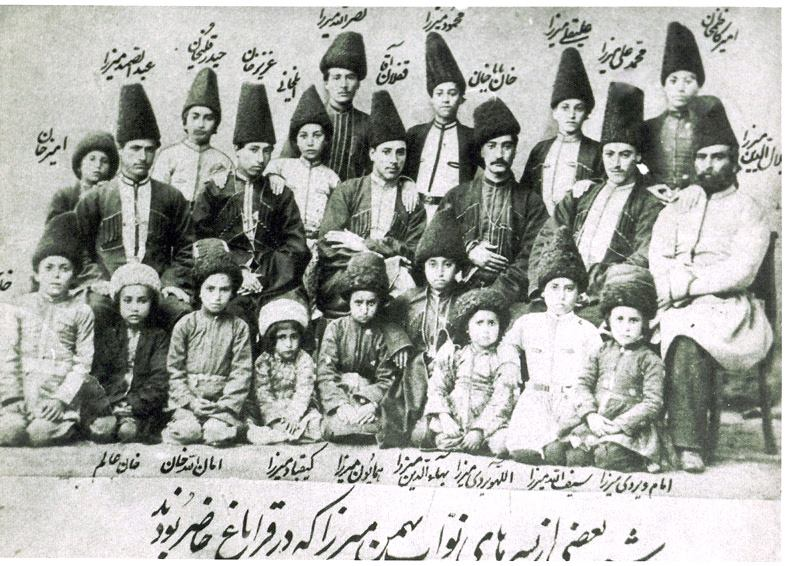
Sons of Bahman Mirza. Amir Kazim Mirza Qajar in the third row, first from right

He was born in 1853 in Shusha, Shusha uezd, Shemakha Governorate, Russian Empire. He received general education in the Tbilisi Gymnasium. In 1873, he graduated with honours from the Nikolaev Cavalry School.

== Family ==
He was a member of the Qajar dynasty. He was born into the family of Bahman Mirza and Mirvari Khanum Talishinskaya and received his first education from family.

== Military service ==
Amir Kazim who began his military service in 1871, served in the 44th Nizhny Novgorod Regiment (1871-1904; 1906), 1st Amur Cossack Regiment (1904-1906) of the 6th Reserve Cavalry Regiment and Caucasus Military District.

During his service, he completed two military courses with honours: the Caucasian Training Company (1880) and the Officer's Cavalry School (1887–1888).

He took part in the Russo-Turkish War (1877–1878) as a part of the 16th Nizhny Novgorod Dragoon regiment. In one of the battles he was wounded with a bayonet in his left arm. For the distinction in this campaign, Amir Kazim Mirza was awarded several military orders.

On 25 January 1885, Rittmaster Amir Kazim Mirza Qajar was appointed commander of the 2nd squadron. On 26 February 1895, he was promoted to lieutenant colonel. Amir Kazim was promoted to the rank of colonel during the Russo-Japanese War for excellence in service.

On 2 March 1906, Colonel Mirza Kazim Qajar was appointed to the headquarters of the Caucasian Military District. In 1909, Colonel Mirza Kazim Qajar was promoted to major general, with dismissal from service, on the basis of the rules on the maximum age qualification, with the award of a uniform and a pension.

In December 1918, he had offered Azerbaijan Democratic Republic his services and joined its army. He served in the Azerbaijan Democratic Republic as the commandant of Ganja.

== Death ==
After the Red Army invasion of Azerbaijan and the suppression of the anti-Soviet uprising in Ganja, Mirza Kazim Qajar was arrested, and executed by the Bolsheviks in the Ganja.

After his death, Mammad Amin Rasulzadeh also remembered Amir Kazim Mirza Qajar in his book Azerbaijan Republic and called him a "martyr of independence".

== Awards ==
- - 4th Class Order of Saint Anne (1877)
- - 3rd Class Order of Saint Stanislaus (1878)
- - 3rd Class Order of Saint Anne (1879)
- - 2nd Class Order of Saint Stanislaus (1879)
- - 2nd Class Order of Saint Anne (1881)
- - 4th Class Order of Saint Vladimir with Swords and Banners (1888)
- - Order of the Lion and the Sun
- - Order of Noble Bukhara (1895)
- - Golden Weapon for Bravery (1906)

== See also ==
- Firudin bey Vazirov
- Abdulhamid bey Gaytabashi
