= Aleksander Reza Qoli Mirza Qajar =

Russian military personnel

Aleksander Petrovich Reza Qoli Mirza Qajar
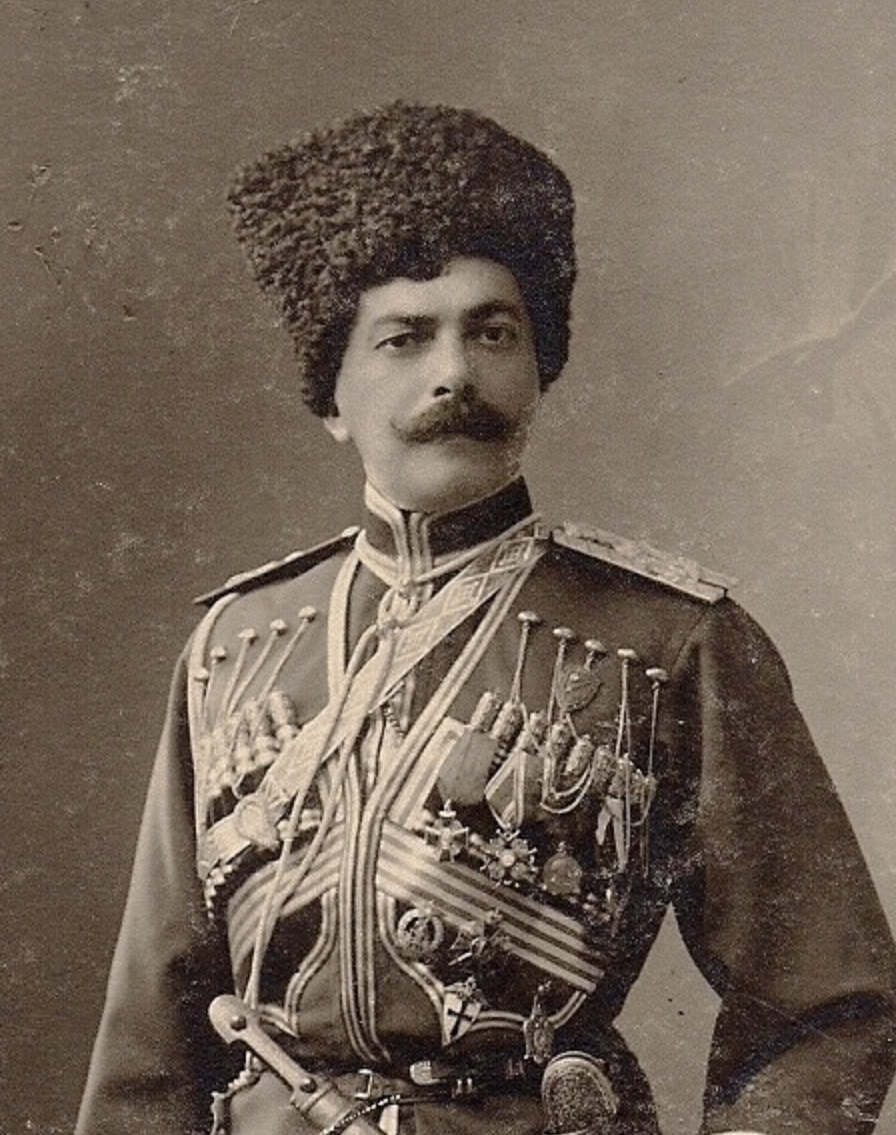
- Aleksander Petrovich Reza Qoli Mirza Qajar in cossack uniform
- Born: Aleksander Petrovich Reza-Qoli-Mirza Qajar; 25 May 1869; Saint Petersburg Governorate, Russian Empire
- Died: c. 4 May 1941; Seattle, United States of America
- Military career
- Allegiance: (Russia) Russian Empire
- Branch: Imperial Russian Army, White Army
- Rank: Colonel (Polkovnik)

Aleksander Petrovich Reza Qoli Mirza Qajar, Prince Persidskii (Russian: Александр Петрович Реза-Кули-Мирза Каджар, принц Персидский; 25 May 1869 – c. 4 May 1941) was a Russian prince, prominent military leader of the White Army and the commander of Yekaterinburg in 1918, during the Russian Civil War (1917-1922). Aleksander Mirza initially served in His Imperial Majesty's Own Escort, where he maintained a close personal relationship with Nicholas II. He eventually attempted to rescue the imprisoned Romanov Imperial Family in 1918; his forces, however, recaptured Yekaterinburg from the Bolsheviks too late.

== Biography ==
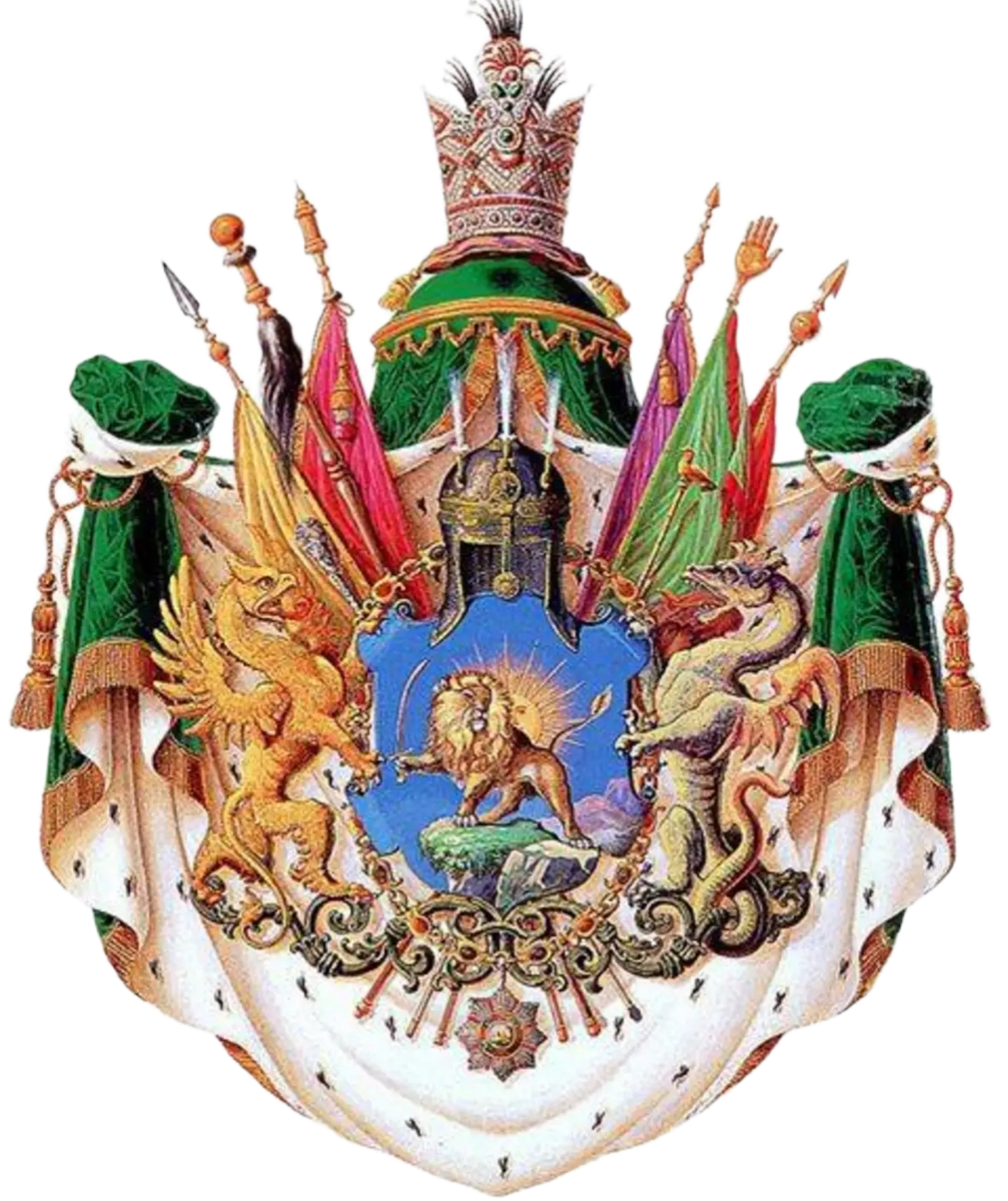
Coat of arms of the Qajar dynasty (c.1860)

Alexander Petrovich Reza Qoli Mirza Qajar was born on May 25, 1869, in the Saint Petersburg Governorate. He was the son of Reza Qoli Mirza (1837–1894), a Persian prince of the Qajar dynasty, who on its turn was the son of Bahman Mirza, who had integrated deeply into Russian service, holding ranks such as fligel-adjutant and staff captain in the Caucasian units. Alexander Mirza was raised in Russia, baptized into the Russian Orthodox Church faith shortly after birth, and had Romanov grand dukes and duchesses as godparents. This environment shaped him fully into Russian imperial society rather than Persian traditions.

He received a typical military education for nobles of his time, attending the Riga three-class school and the Vilnius Military School in 1890–1893.

== Military career ==
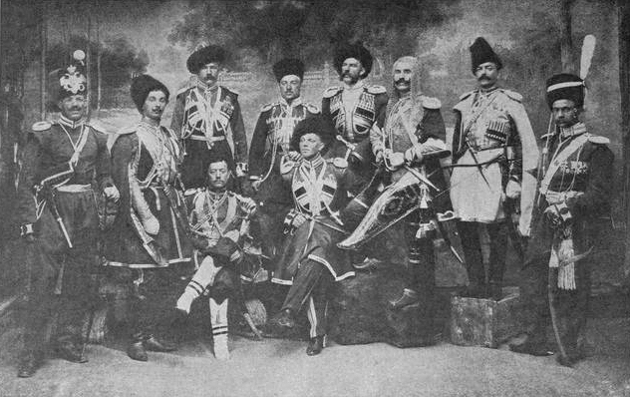
Alexander Petrovich (second from the right) among other officers of His Majesty's Own Cossack during the escort's centennial anniversary, 1911.

In 1903, Aleksander Mirza was formally enrolled in His Imperial Majesty's Own Escort, an elite unit dedicated to the personal security of Nicholas II. During this time, Aleksander Mirza regularly accompanied Nicholas II on domestic travels. It was only in 1914, over a decade later, that Aleksander Mirza was promoted to Yesaul. In the beginning of World War I, he oversaw construction projects for barracks in Tsarskoye Selo under imperial directive.

== Russian Civil War ==
Attempt to rescue the Romanov family (1918)

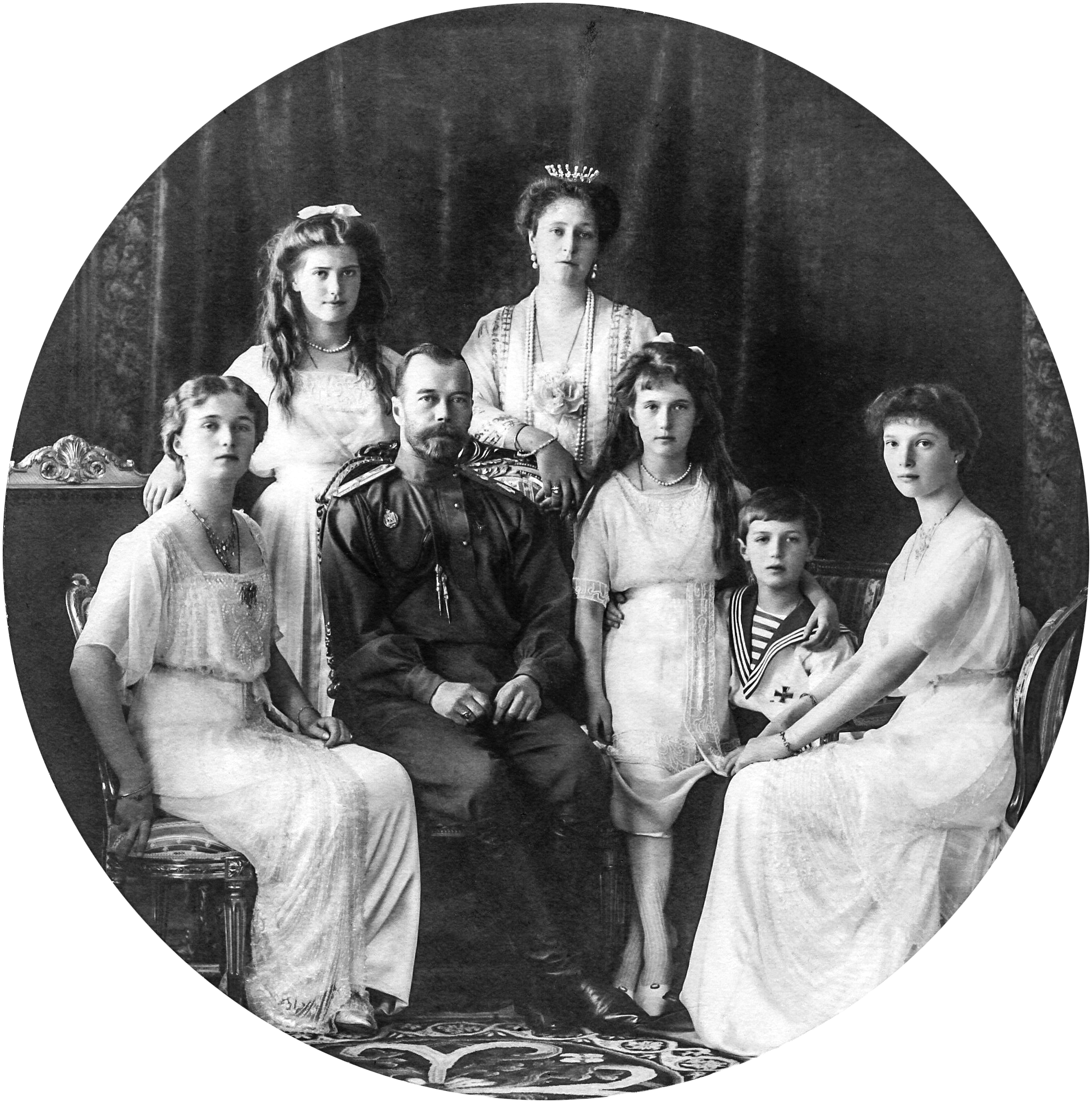
Nicholas II and the Russian Imperial Family; Alexandra Feodorovna, Grand Duchess Olga Nikolaevna of Russia, Grand Duchess Tatiana Nikolaevna of Russia, Grand Duchess Maria Nikolaevna of Russia, Grand Duchess Anastasia Nikolaevna of Russia and Alexei Nikolaevich, Tsarevich of Russia

During the Russian Civil War, Aleksander Mirza remained firmly loyal to the Nicholas II and took on important responsibilities in the Ural region with the White Army. When he learned that the Bolsheviks had transferred the Romanov imperial family to Yekaterinburg in 1918, he made his way there on his own initiative. At considerable personal risk, he established contact with Terenty Chemodurov, the Tsar’s former valet, who was able to give him first-hand information about the dire conditions inside the Ipatiev House. Aleksander Mirza worked on plans to organize a rescue operation for Nicholas II and his family. These attempts ultimately failed when the Bolsheviks murdered the Romanov family the night of 16–17 July 1918, only days before White troops arrived.

Commandant of Yekaterinburg (1918–1919)

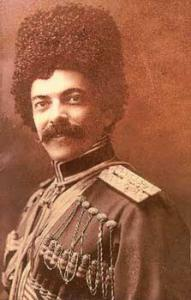
Aleksander Mirza as commandant

After the White Army liberated Yekaterinburg on 25 July 1918, Alexander Mirza was quickly appointed military commandant of the city. In this position he was responsible for maintaining order, securing the strategically important industrial center, and overseeing local administration in the newly liberated territory. He later served as assistant to the garrison commander for military affairs and, for a short period between January and March 1919, acted as chief of the Yekaterinburg garrison. During his time in command he issued numerous orders related to security, logistics, and military organization; several of these documents have survived in archives.In the spring of 1919, as the military situation deteriorated, he was transferred to the reserve of officers at the headquarters of the Siberian Army. He continued to move with the retreating White forces, following Admiral Kolchak’s army eastward through Siberia. Eyewitnesses noted his striking presence when he formed part of the mounted escort protecting Kolchak during the Supreme Ruler’s departure from Yekaterinburg in February 1919. He remained with the collapsing Eastern Front until the final stages of the White resistance in Siberia, after which he joined the general evacuation of anti-Bolshevik officers and civilians.His role was mainly administrative and organizational rather than frontline combat, but it demonstrated consistent loyalty to the White movement and the old imperial order right up to the point of final defeat.

== Exile and death ==
After the defeat of the Whites, Alexander emigrated via the Russian Far East and eventually settled in Seattle, Washington, in the United States. In America he stayed active in Russian émigré circles and published memoirs about his years in the Tsar’s Convoy in the New York-based newspaper Novoe Russkoe Slovo (New Russian Word).He died on 4 May 1941 in Seattle at the age of 71
