= Gennady Tarkhanov =

Russian general

- Russian: Геннадий Николаевич Тарханов Azerbaijani: Gennadi Nikolayeviç Tarxanov
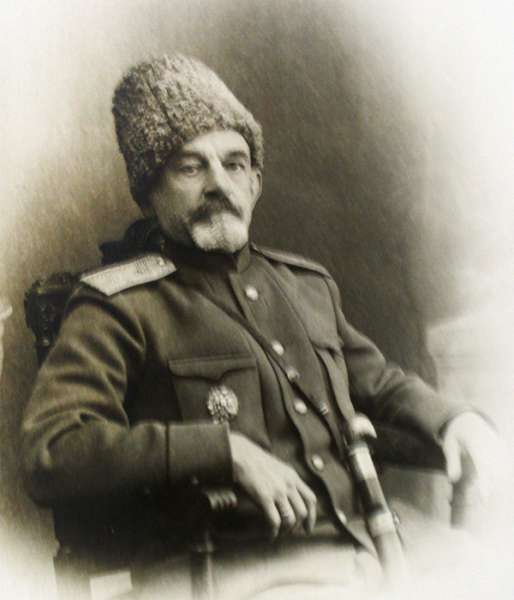
- In 1919
- Born: Gennady Nikolaevich Tarkhanov; September 8, 1854; Russian Empire
- Died: Unknown
- Children: Colonel Yevgeny Tarkhanov
- Military career
- Allegiance: Russian Empire (from 1871 to 1917); Azerbaijan Democratic Republic (from 1919 to 1920)
- Branch: Engineering
- Service years: 1871 – 1920
- Rank: (Russian Empire) Lieutenant general of The Imperial Russian Army (from 1871 to 1909), head of the Engineering Department of The National Army of Azerbaijan Democratic Republic (from 1919 to 1920)
- Conflicts: Russo-Turkish War; World War I
- Awards: 3rd Class Order of Saint Vladimir 2nd Class Order of Saint Vladimir 1st Class Ode of Saint Stanislaus 2nd Class Order of Saint Anne 3rd Class Ode of Saint Stanislaus 1st Class Order of Saint Anne

Gennady Nikolaevich Tarkhanov (Russian: Генна́дий Никола́евич Тарха́нов, Azerbaijani: Gennadi Nikolayeviç Tarxanov, born September 8, 1854, Imperial Russia - unknown) - Russian and Azerbaijani military leader, lieutenant general.

== Life ==
He was born in 1854 in Russian Empire to Orthodoxy family. He received general education in the Nikolaev Engineering School. In 1873 he graduated with honors from the Nikolaev Cavalry School.

He entered the service as a cadet of an ordinary rank on September 6, 1871, at the Nikolaev Engineering School and was listed on August 7, 1874, as a podporuchik in the 2nd engineer battalion. As part of it, he participated in the Russo-Turkish War (1877–1878). On July 13, 1877, he was promoted to lieutenant.

He graduated from the Nikolaev Engineering Academy in the 1st category and worked as a producer at Tiflis Engineering Distance for 13 years. December 6, 1895 promoted to lieutenant colonel. From August 26, 1897, to March 27, 1900, he served as an assistant to the head of the Tiflis Engineering Distance. Since March 27, 1900, he was among the staff officers assigned by the state at the disposal of the Main Engineering Directorate. On April 9, 1900, he was promoted to colonel.

From February 16, 1904, he served as a head of the Tiflis Engineering Distance. June 24, 1910 he was appointed Assistant Chief of Engineers of the Caucasian Military District. In 1910 he became Major General. On October 22, 1912, he was appointed head of the department for housing allowance of the troops of the Caucasus Military District. In 1916 he became Lieutenant General.

After Russian Empire's collapse he entered to Azerbaijan Democratic Republic's army. During 1919 - 1920 - until occupation of Azerbaijan by Bolsheviks - he served in the ADR army. He held the position of head of the Engineering Department. He was also a member of the Military Council.

Gennady Nikolaevich's son, Lieutenant Colonel (after March 24, 1920, Colonel) Yevgeny Tarkhanov had served as the commander of the 1st battery of the Separate Artillery Division in the armed forces of the Republic of Azerbaijan since February 18, 1919.

== Awards ==
- - 1st Class Order of Saint Anne (1877)
- - 3rd Class Order of Saint Stanislaus (1878)
- - 2nd Class Order of Saint Anne (1893)
- - 3rd Class Order of Saint Vladimir (1906)
- - 1st Class Order of Saint Stanislaus (1913)
- - 2nd Class Order of Saint Vladimir (1916)
