= Shekl-e Shah =

19th century rock relief in Iran

- شکلِ شاه (Persian)
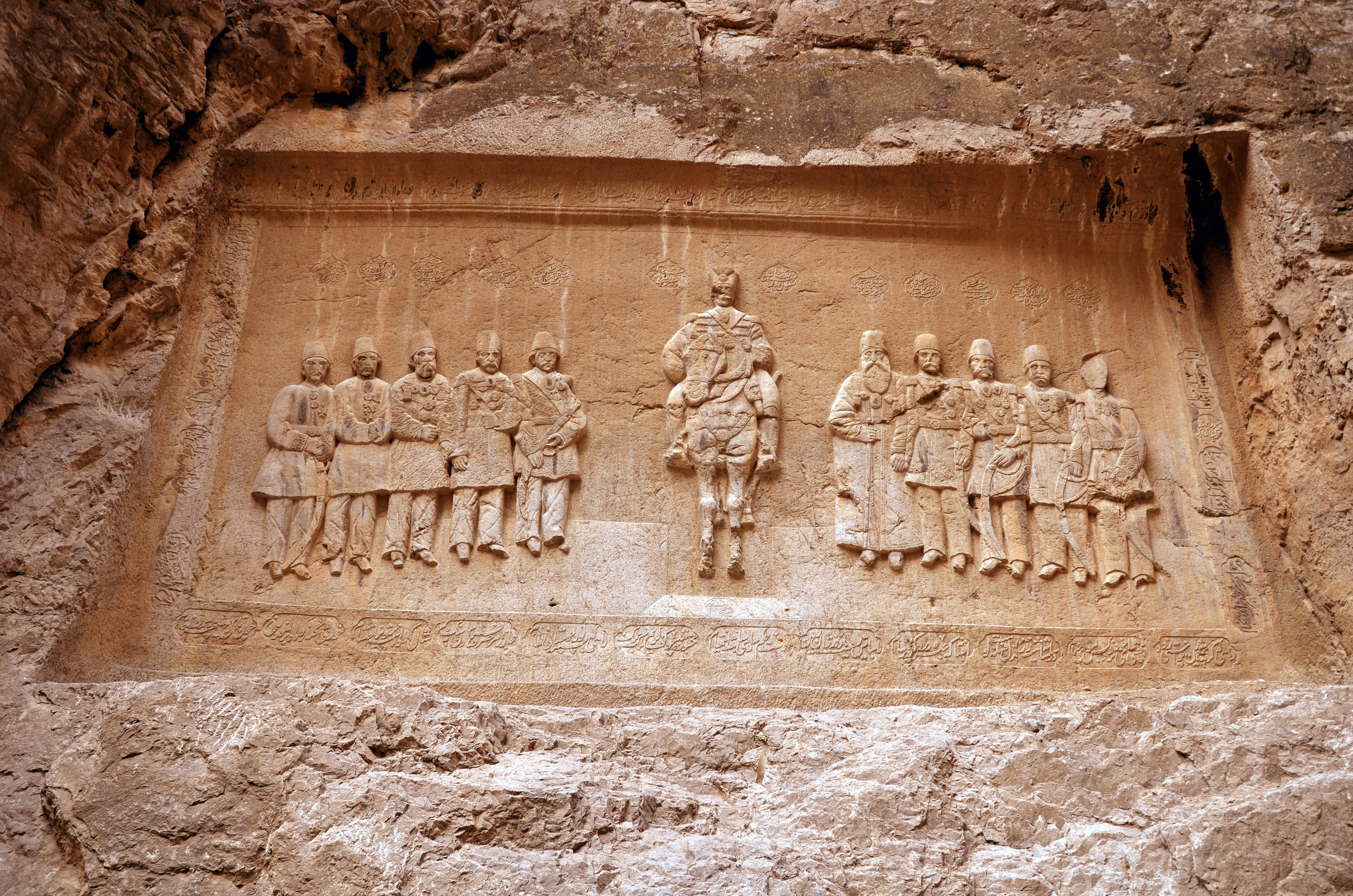
- Naser ed-Din Shah relief
- Interactive map of Shekl-e Shah
- Location: Mazandaran Province, Iran

History
- Built: 1295 AH, 1878 AD

Site notes
- Area: Haraz Road
- Architect: Ali-Akbar Hajjarbashi
- Governing body: Ministry of Cultural Heritage, Tourism and Handicrafts

Iran National Heritage List
- Designated: 29 September 2002
- Reference no.: 6272

Shekl-e Shah (Persian: شکل شاه, lit. 'Shah's figure') is a rock relief near Haraz Road, Iran. It was commissioned by Naser al-Din Shah Qajar around 1875, during his journey to Mazanderan and was completed in 1878.

== History ==
Since pre-Islam era, Haraz Valley had been historically used as a link between Iranian Plateau and Caspian Sea. After Tehran was selected as the capital of Qajar Iran in 1796, its population was tripled in less than a decade and commercial traffic between there and the fertile lands of Caspian shoreline soared. In order to pass Alborz, Haraz Valley was naturally the shortest, but not the easiest route to Mazanderan.

Naser al-Din Shah was an extensive traveller; because of his long journeys to many remote districts of Persia, roads and bridges were significantly improved by his official orders. Of those improved thoroughfares, Haraz ancient route was significantly upgraded, so that two carriages could pass at the same time. Shekl-e Shah was carved as a memorial to those costly developments.

It was not until 1963 that Vana Tunnel was constructed as part of the newly paved Haraz Road and the ancient route along the course of the river was largely abandoned.

== Features ==
The relief is carved within a rectangular frame 8 m long and 4 m high. It shows the shah on horseback, flanked by ten standing ministers and carries an inscription in Persian poetic verses, describing the process of its carving. Shekl-e Shah is the latest in a tradition of large rock reliefs ordered by Iranian rulers. It is close to an ancient Sassanid road. According to E'temad os-Saltaneh (notable Qajar vizier), comparing with the reliefs commissioned by Fath-Ali Shah (Great-grandfather of Naser-al Din Shah) in Tangeh-ye Vashi and Cheshmeh-Ali, Shekl-e Shah was constructed with lower artistic qualities. Reportedly, Russian soldiers used this relief for target practice during World War II.

== Access ==
Shekl-e Shah is located at Band-e Boride Gorge, on the left bank of Haraz River. Accessing the relief is only possible from the southern end of the gorge, at the southern end of Vana Tunnel. There is an open parking space (for a fee) and a cafeteria. The dirt footpath towards the relief is about half a kilometre long. There is rock climbing gear on the rocks, some meters away from the relief, which is often used by the climbers.

== Gallery ==
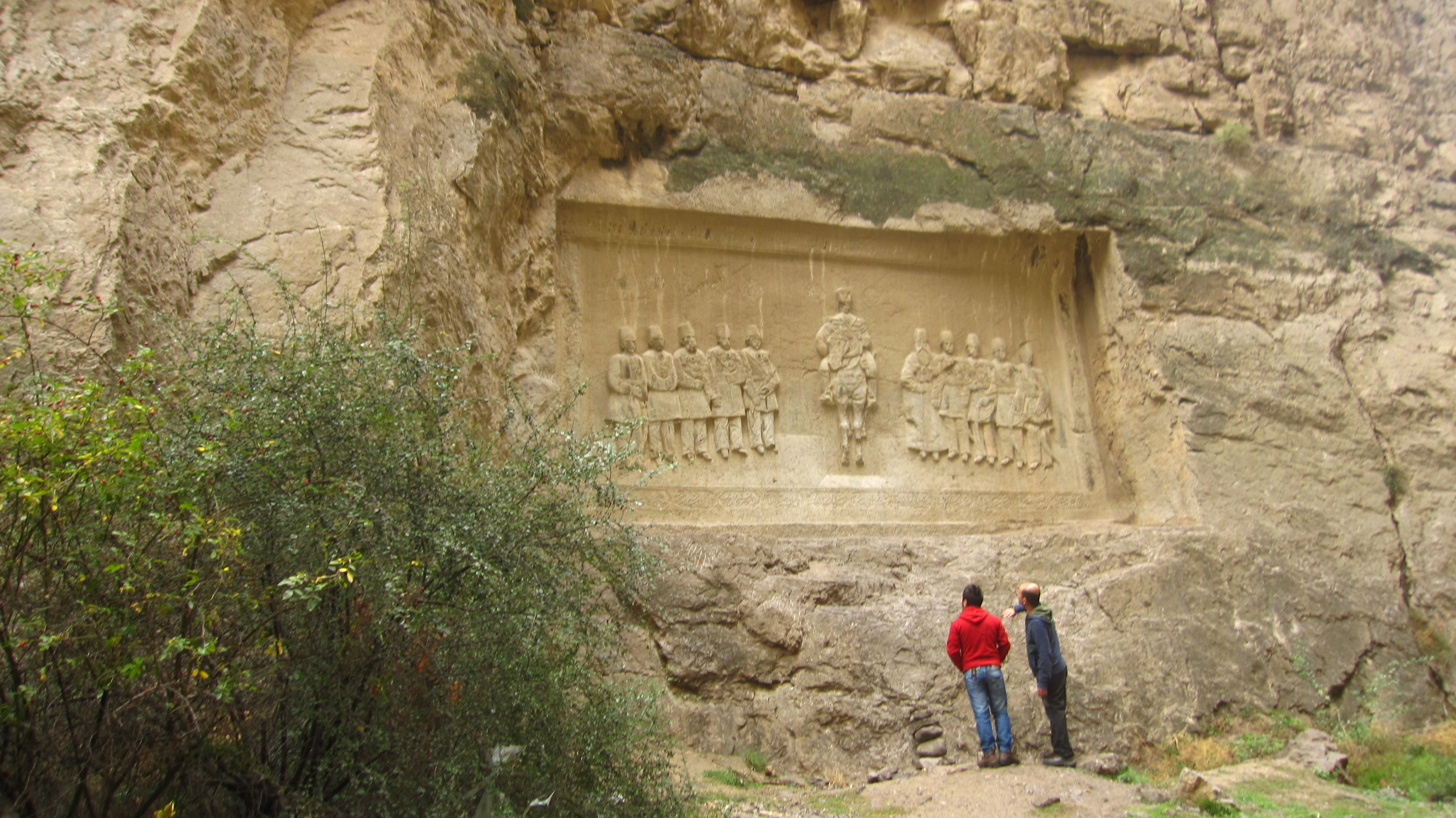

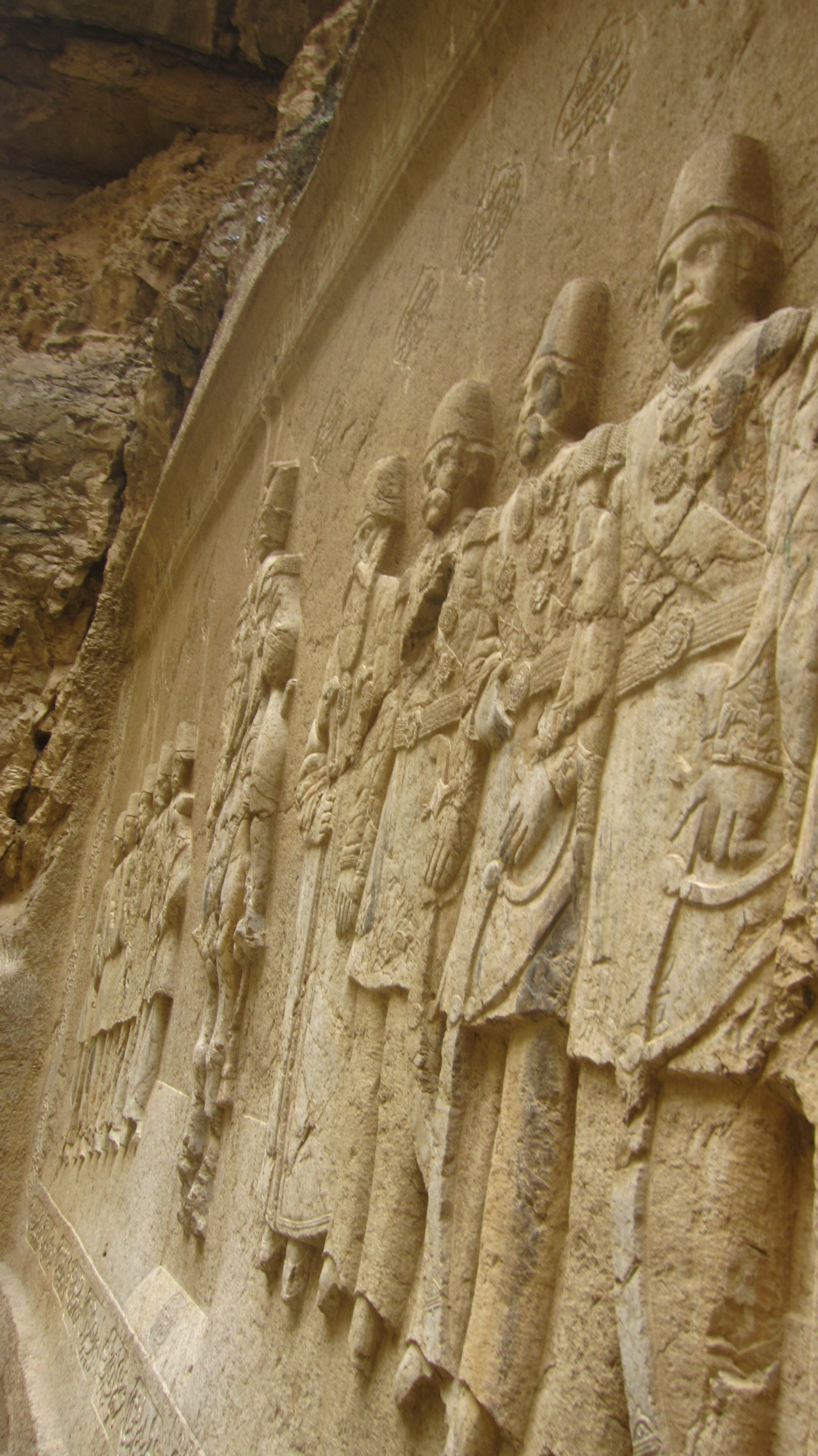

== See also ==
- Art of rock relief in ancient Iran
