= Tangeh-ye Vashi =

Gorge in Tehran province, Iran

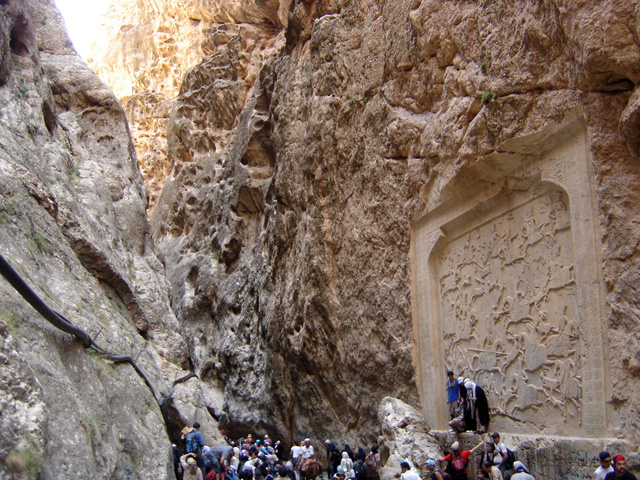
Visitors from Tehran flock to the area on weekends to enjoy the idyllic surroundings.

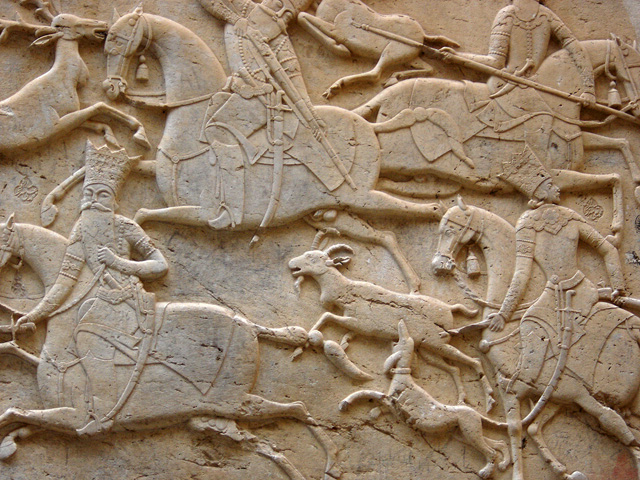

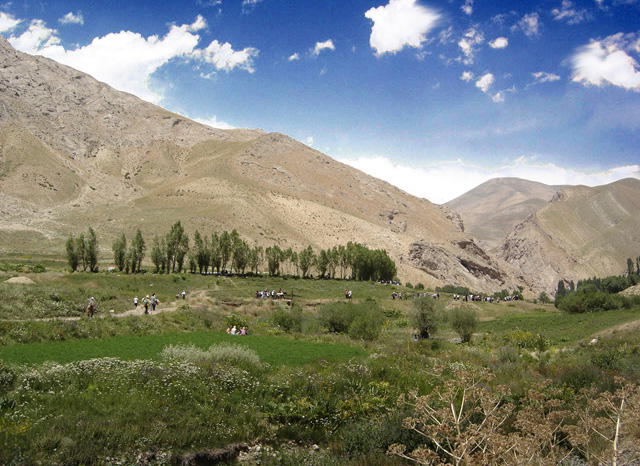
The valley after the first narrow extends two miles before the next narrow containing waterfalls.

Tangeh-ye Vashi (Persian: تنگه واشی) (35°52′33″N 52°43′37″E) is a gorge and mountain pass in the Alborz mountain range, Iran. The narrow gorge was created by a perennial stream which comes down from a series of waterfalls upstream. Slightly lower, in a hilly area, the stream provided a patch of grazing land within the mountains.

== Gallery ==
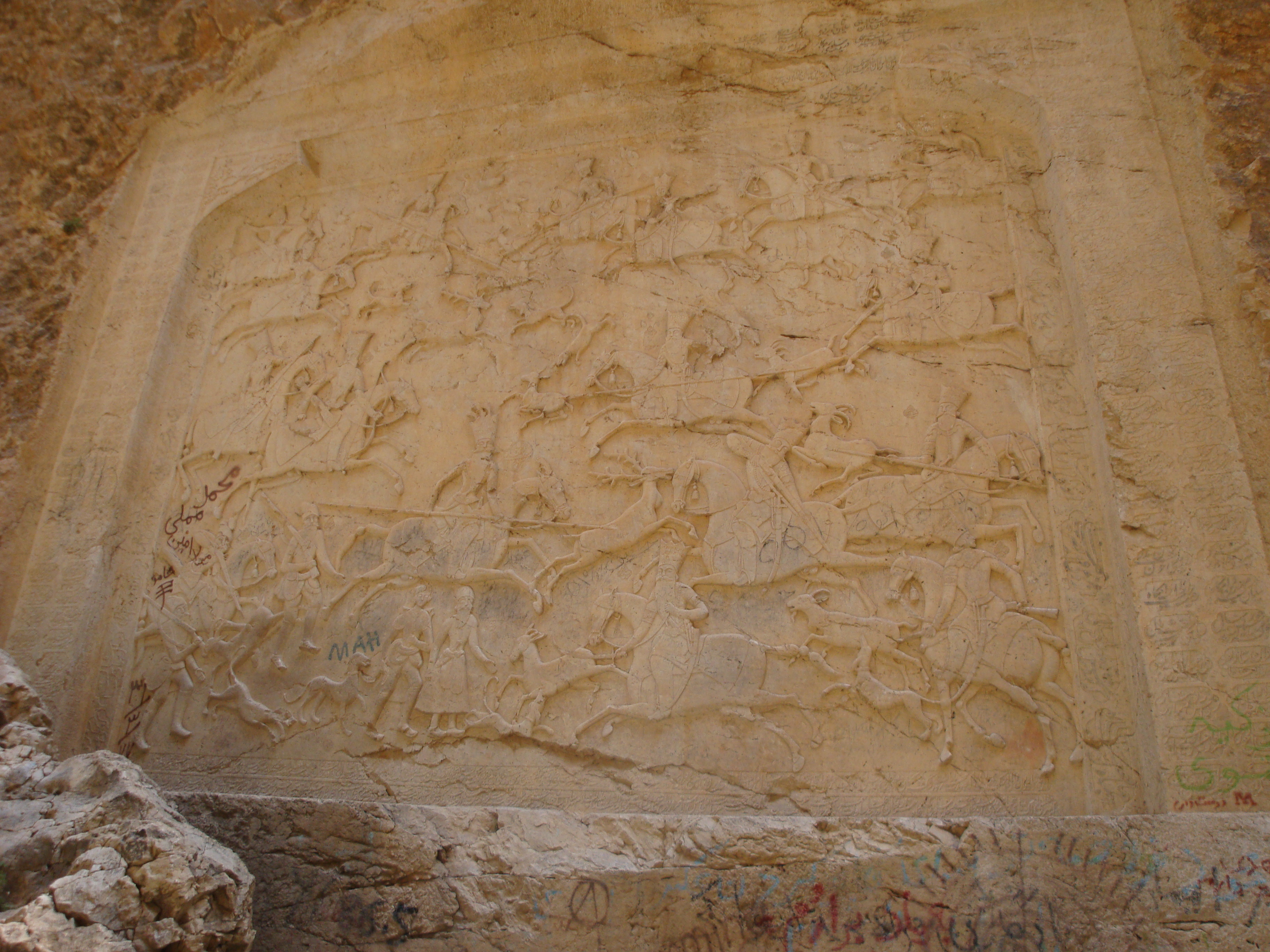

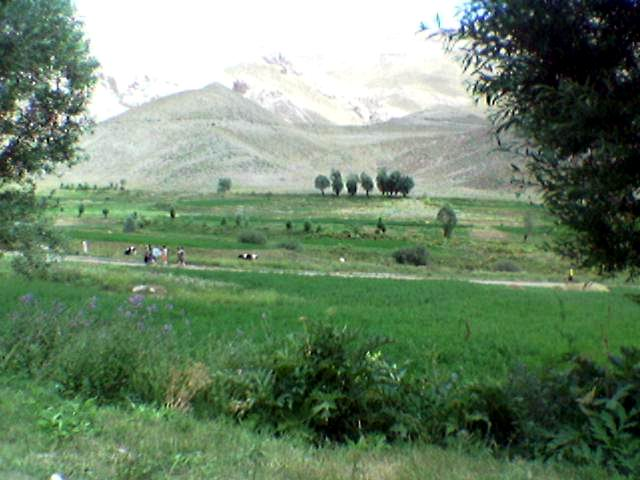

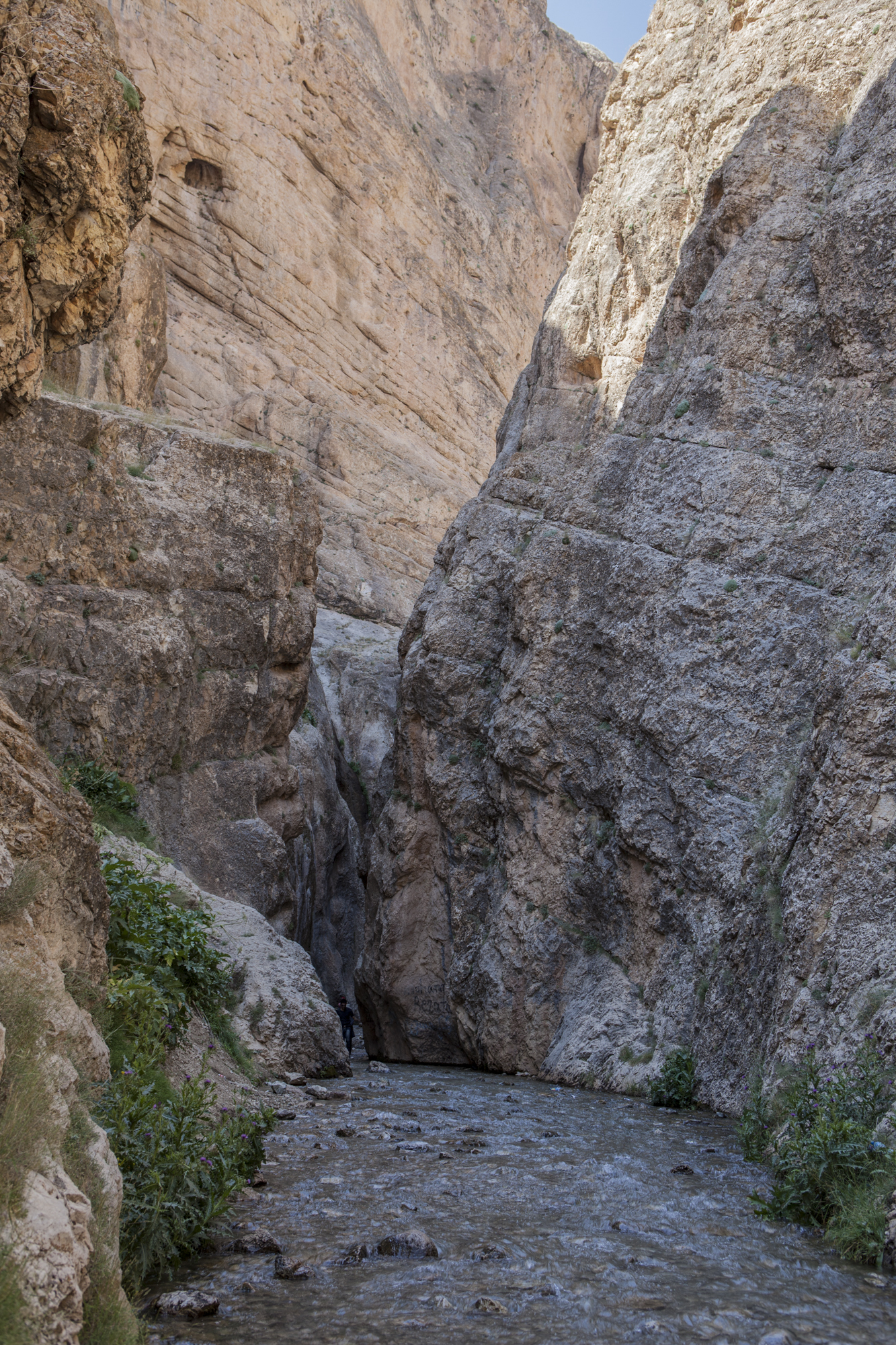

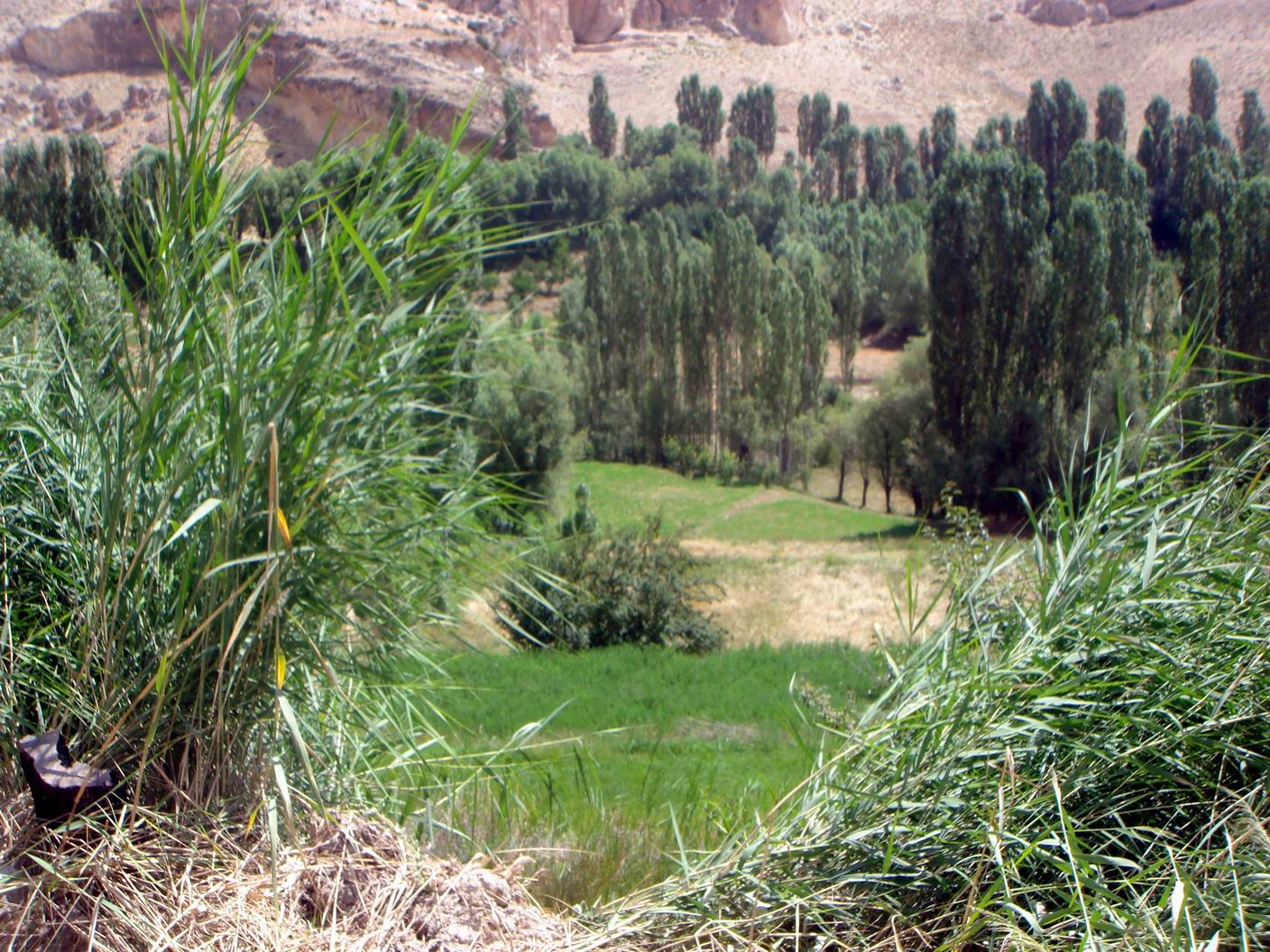

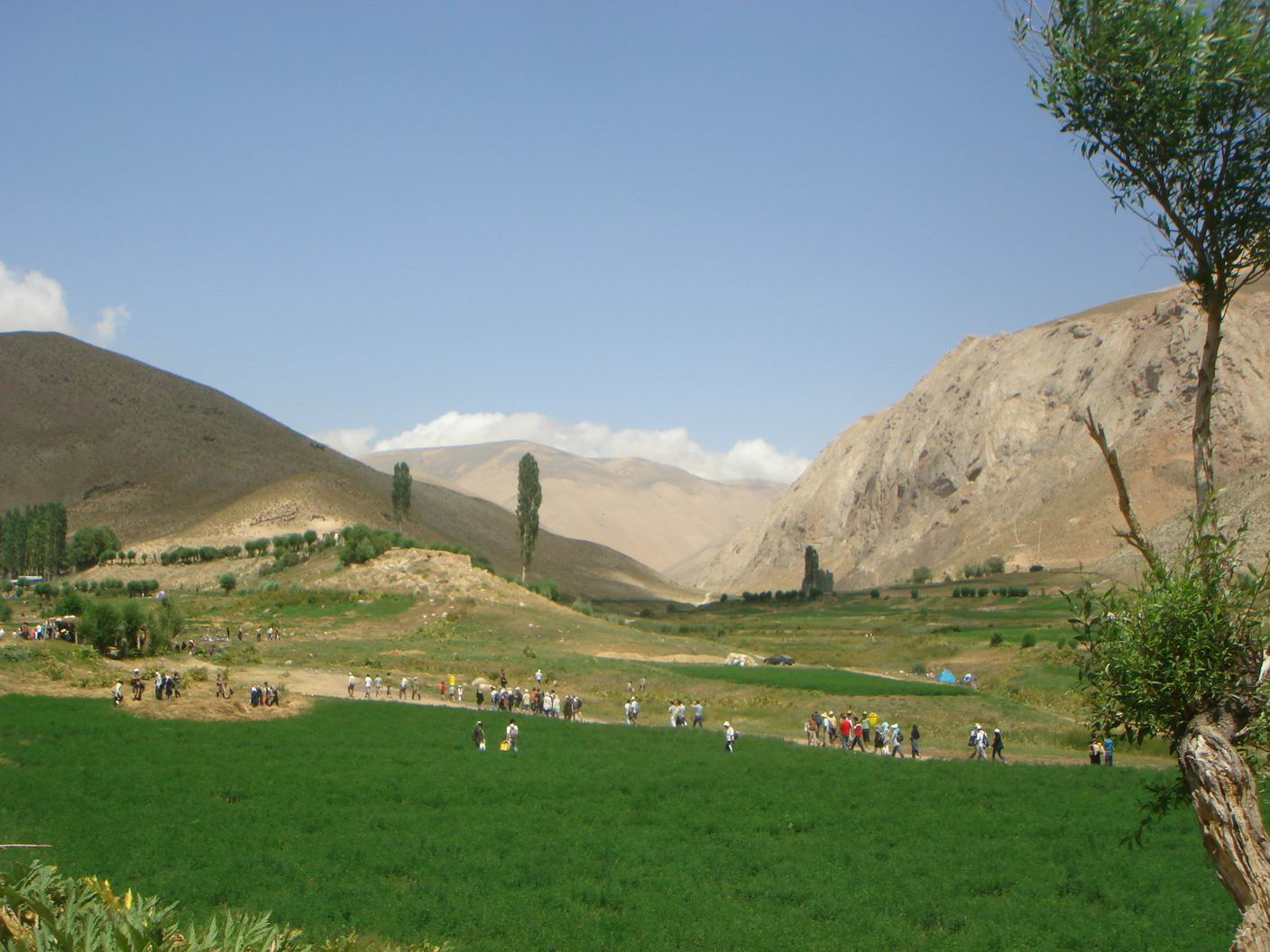

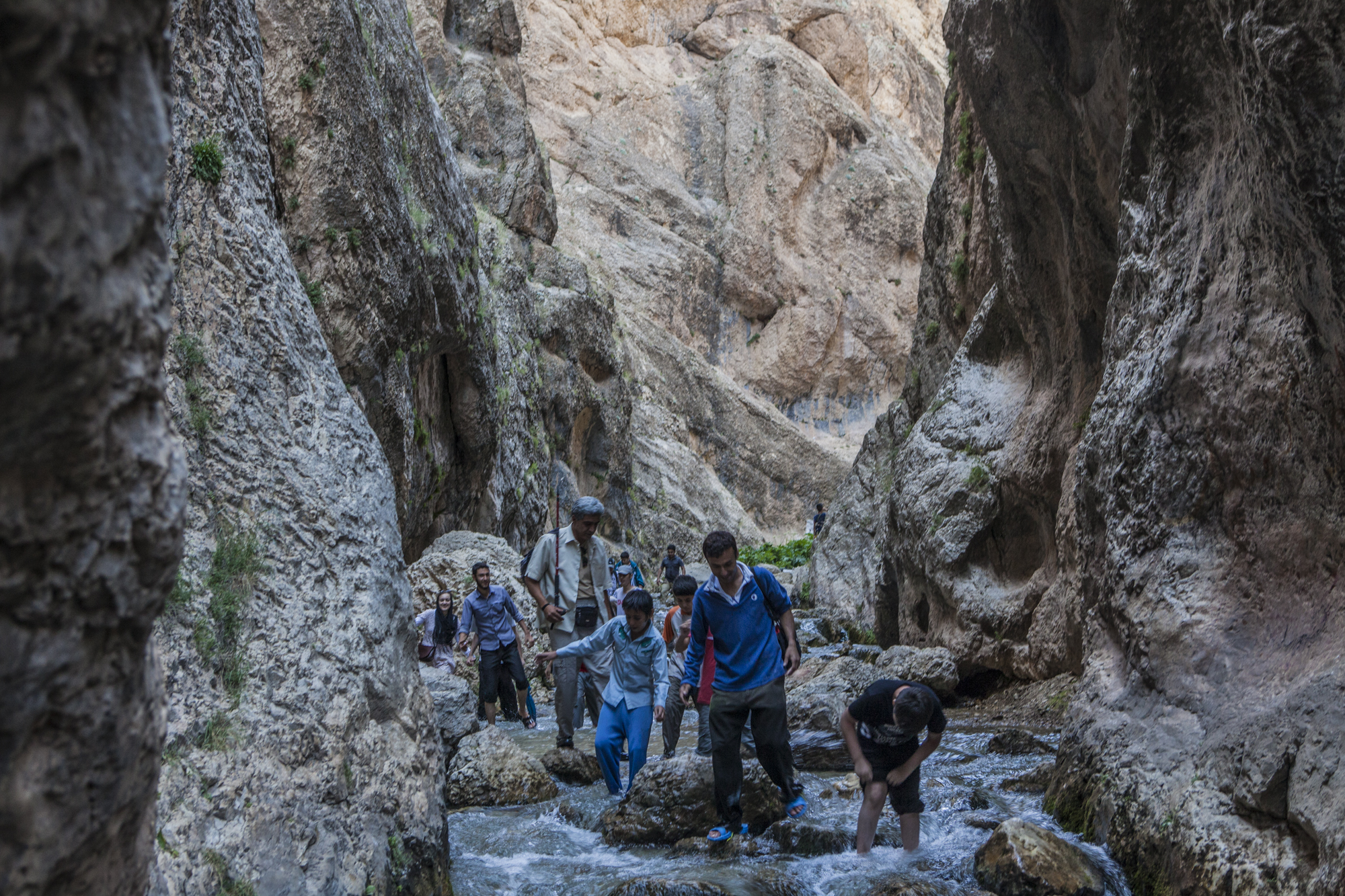

== See also ==
- Damavand city
- Rudehen
- Fath Ali Shah Qajar
- Nassereddin Shah relief
