= Firudin bey Vazirov =

Russian general

- Azerbaijani: Firudin bəy Vəzirov
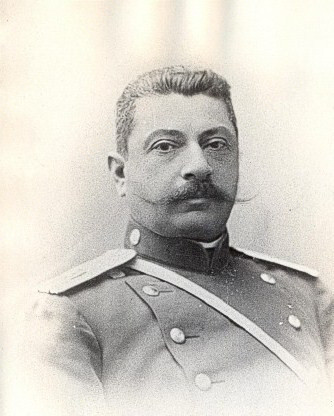
- Born: Firudin bey Jamal bey oglu Vazirov; April 19, 1850; Tiflis, Tiflis Governorate, Russian Empire
- Died: June 30, 1925 (aged 75); Baku, Azerbaijan SSR, USSR
- Military career
- Allegiance: Russian Empire (from 1886 to 1917); Azerbaijan Democratic Republic (to 1920)
- Branch: Cavalry
- Service years: 1868–1921
- Rank: (Russian Empire) Lieutenant general of The Imperial Russian Army (from 1868 to 1906), Cavalry General of The National Army of Azerbaijan Democratic Republic (from 1919 to 1920)
- Unit: Cavalry
- Commands: 16th Tver Dragoon Regiment; 4th Novotroitsko-Yekaterinoslavsky Dragoon Regiment
- Conflicts: Russo-Turkish War
- Awards: 2nd Class Ode of Saint Stanislaus 3rd Class Ode of Saint Stanislaus 2nd Class Order of Saint Anne 3rd Class Order of Saint Anne 3rd Class Order of Saint Vladimir 4th Class Order of Saint Vladimir

Firudin bey Vazirov (Azerbaijani: Firudin bəy Vəzirov, b. April 19, 1850 – d. 30 June 1925) was a decorated Imperial Russian and Azerbaijani military commander, having the rank of Major-General. In the Russian imperial army, he was the commander of the 4th Squadron of 15th Dragoon Regiment, and the commander of 10th Novotroitsko-Yekaterinoslavsky Dragoon Regiment.

He also worked as a translator. In "Cradle Songs" written in Russian and Arabic alphabets, he translated bayats, lullabies and proverbs into Russian.

== Early life ==
He was born on 19 April 1872 to Jamal bey's family in Tiflis, Tiflis Governorate, Russian Imperia. He received general education in the Tbilisi Gymnasium. In 1870 he graduated with honors from the military school in Kropivnitsky (formerly Elizavetgrad).

== Military service ==
He began his military service in Belarus. On October 20, 1870, he received the rank of cornet. In 1872 he was promoted to Lieutenant, in 1874 to Stabskapitän, and in 1876 to Captain. In 1876 he was sent to the Cavalry Training Squadron. On August 23, 1878, he was sent to the 15th Tver Dragon Regiment of the Caucasus Cavalry Division. On September 20, he became the commander of the fourth squadron of this regiment.

On 5 May 1881 was promoted to major. In May 1882, Firudun bey Vezirov was appointed a member of the Caucasian Military District Court. On 6 May 1884 was promoted to lieutenant colonel. He commanded a squadron for 12 years.

On October 11, 1890, he was transferred to the 28th Novgorod Dragoon Regiment of the 10th Cavalry Division of the 10th Army Corps. On October 13, 1897, he was promoted to colonel "for distinction in service". On January 28, 1900, Firudin bey was appointed commander of the 10th Novotroitsko-Yekaterinoslav Dragoon Regiment of the 4th Cavalry Division of the 6th Army Corps. He served in Warsaw, Rylsk and other cities. On 18 April 1906, the commander of the 10th Novotroitsko-Yekaterinoslavsky Dragoon Regiment, Colonel Firudin bey was promoted to major general, with dismissal from service, on the basis of the rules on the maximum age qualification, with the award of a uniform and a pension.

After some time, Firudin bey moved to Tiflis. He lived on Mikhailovskaya Street at number 111.

In May 1919, he received an offer from the Azerbaijan Democratic Republic and joined its army. He served in the Azerbaijan Democratic Republic as the commandant of Baku and the chief of the Baku city garrison.

== Family ==
He married Colonel Krichinski's daughter, Zinaida Selimovna Krichinski, and had two daughters. Nigar was born in 1902 and Safiyya in 1907.

== Awards ==
- - 3rd Class Order of Saint Stanislaus (19.01.1882).
- - 3rd Class Order of Saint Anne (6.05.1889)
- - 2nd Class Order of Saint Stanislaus (15.07.1893)
- - 4th Class Order of Saint Vladimir with Swords and Banners (22.09.1898)
- - 2nd Class Order of Saint Anne (1.08.1902)
- - 3rd Class Order of Saint Vladimir (20.11.1905)

== Death ==
Although Firudin Bey was arrested several times after the April occupation, he was later released. Finally, he was executed on June 30, 1925, in Baku.
