= Ali Reza Khan Azod-ol-Molk =

Iranian politician

Ali Reza Khan
- Azod-ol-Molk
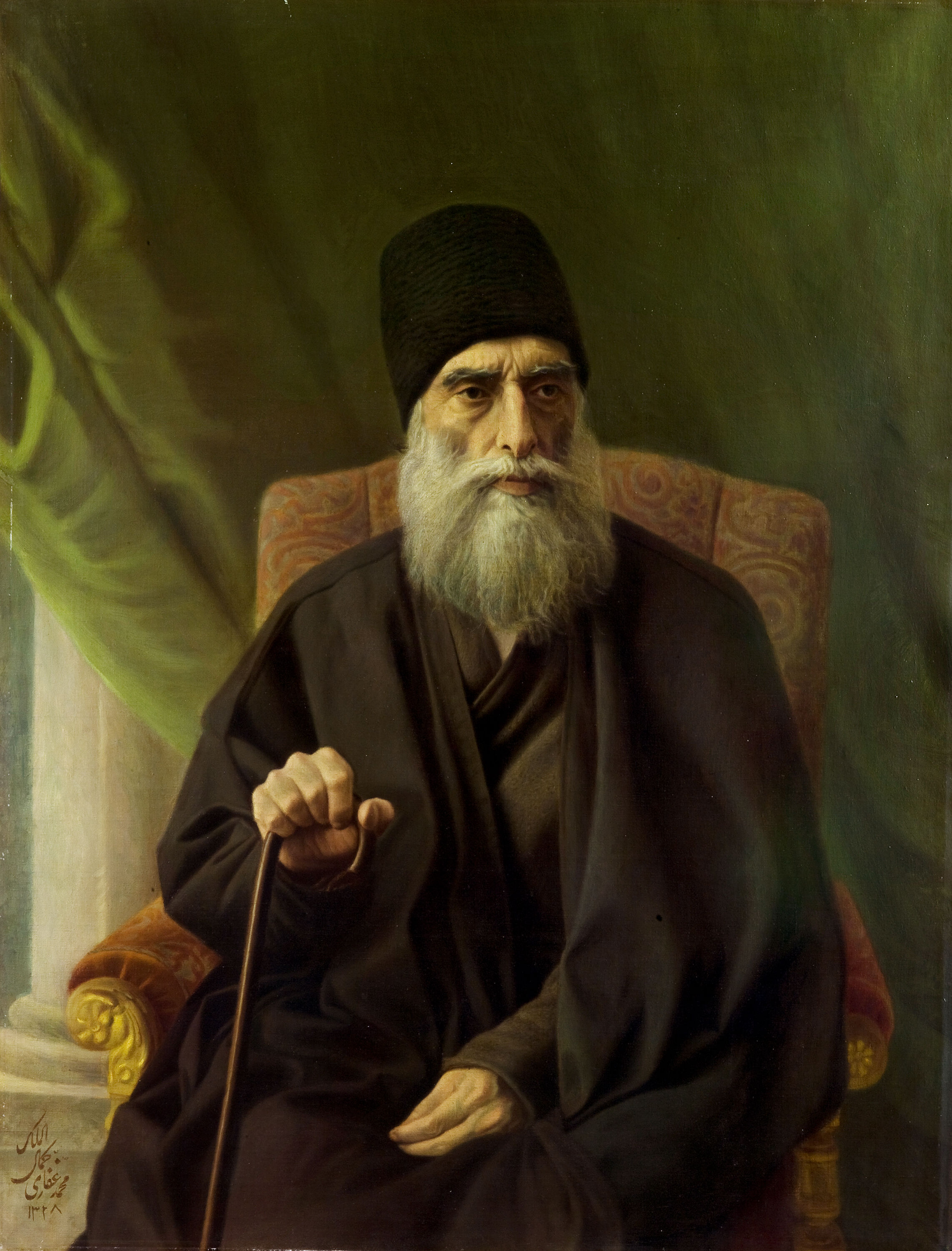
- Portrait by Kamal-ol-molk, 1911

Regent of Iran
- Regency: 16 July 1909 – 22 September 1910
- Successor: Abolqasem Naser ol-Molk
- Monarch: Ahmad Shah Qajar

Il khan (chief) of Qajar tribe
- Tenure: 1873 – 22 September 1910
- Born: 11 October 1847
- Died: 22 September 1910 (aged 62)
Names
- Ali Reza Khan
- House: Amirsoleimani
- Dynasty: Qajar
- Father: Musa Khan Qajar
- Religion: Shia Islam

Ali-Reza Khan Azod-ol-Molk (Persian: علیرضا خان عضدالملک; 11 October 1847 – 22 September 1910) was an Iranian politician who acted as regent for Ahmad Shah Qajar, the last shah of the Qajar dynasty.

Azod ol-Molk was the statesman known for his simple character, deep religious devotion and close relationship with Naser al-Din Shah Qajar. He held several important positions at Qajar court, including head of royal pages, superintendent of royal household, chief of the Qajar tribe and Minister of Justice. His wealth, influence and imposing position at court led contemporaries to jokingly call him the Emperor of China (Khaqan-e Chin). Despite his high status, he was respected by Ulama for his piety and played an important mediating role during the Tobacco Protest. Following the deposition of Mohammad Ali Shah Qajar in 1909, he became Regent for the young Ahmad Shah Qajar, and held position under death on 22 September 1910.

== Biography ==
=== Background ===
Ali Reza Khan was an Qajar prince from Amirsoleimani family, his father was Musa Khan Qajar, the son of Soleiman Khan E'tezad od-Dowleh, a cousin of Malek Jahan Khanom, mother of Naser al-Din Shah Qajar.

=== Early career ===
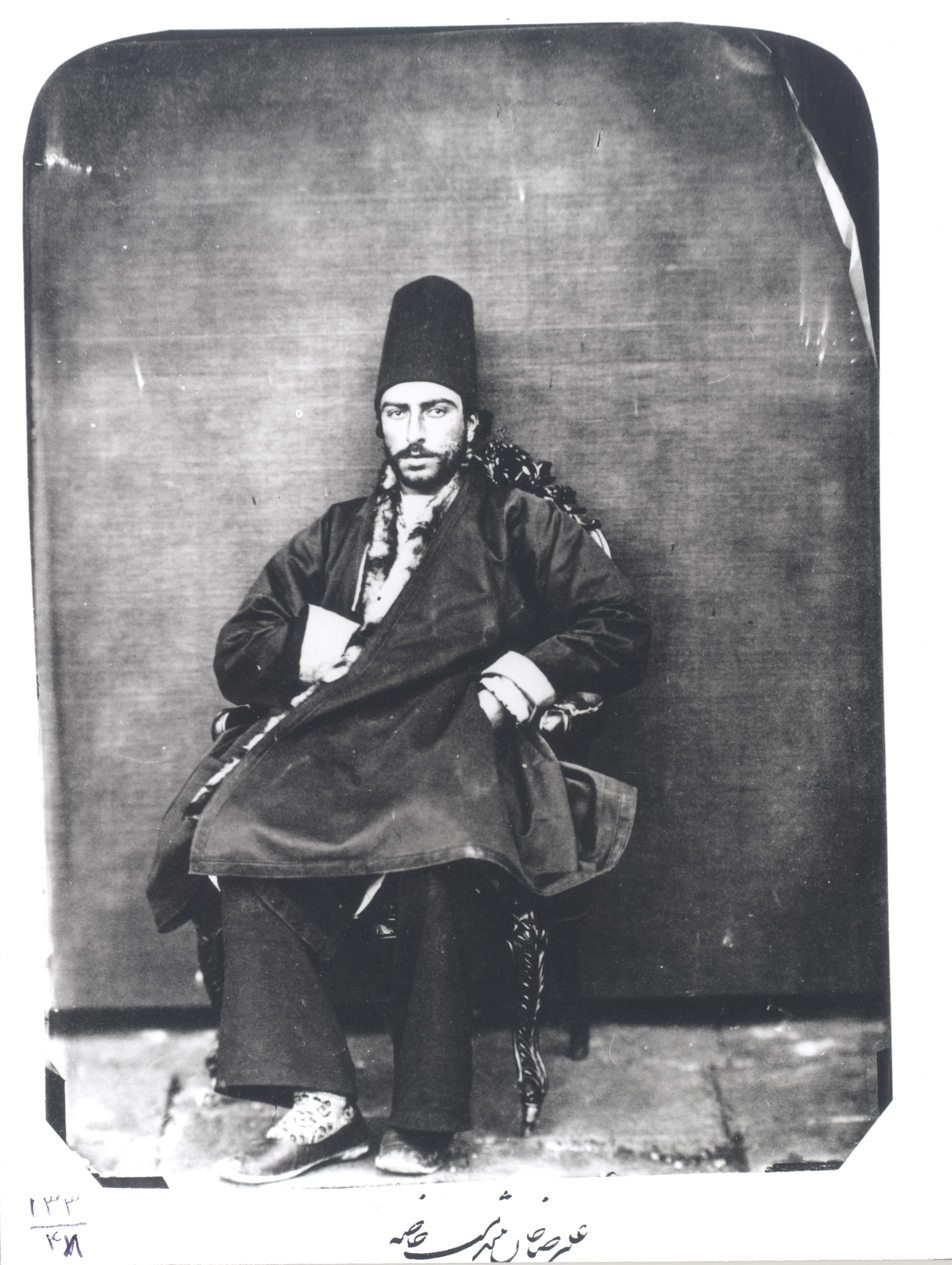
Photograph of Young Ali Reza Khan

Following court custom, Ali Reza Khan entered royal service as page (Gholam-bacheh) early in Naser al-Din Shah's reign. He was later accused of leaking harem affairs to Grand vizier Mirza Aqa Khan Nuri, warning him of his impending dismissal. After the leak was discovered, Ali Reza Khan was bastinadoed and expelled from the inner royal quarters. However, through intervention of Shah's mother, Mahd-e Olya, he was reinstated and eventually promoted to head page (Gholam-Bashi). Simple-hearted, uneducated and deeply religious, Ali Reza Khan was highly trusted by Naser al-Din Shah and steadily rose in his favor. In 1866, when Shah decided to send gilded bricks to Al-Askari Shrine in Samarra, Mahd-e Olya persuaded him to entrust the mission to Ali Reza Khan. After completing the mission, Ali Reza Khan rejoined the Shah at Firuzkuh on his return from Khorasan and accompanied him to Tehran, where he received the title Azod ol-Molk (Support of the Realm) in 1868.

Around 1871, Azod ol-Molk was appointed controller of royal household after transfer of Amir-Aslan Khan Majd od-Dowleh, a maternal uncle of shah and first cousin of Azod ol-Molk, to governorship of Khuzestan. He is mentioned as superintendent in 1882. In June-July 1885, Mehdi Qoli Khan Majd od-Dowleh replaced him. Ali Reza Khan accompanied shah in his visits to holy places in Iraq and two journeys to Europe. In 1873, he was appointed chief (Il khan) of Qajar tribe. On 4 May 1884 Ali Reza Khan was appointed Minister of Justice.

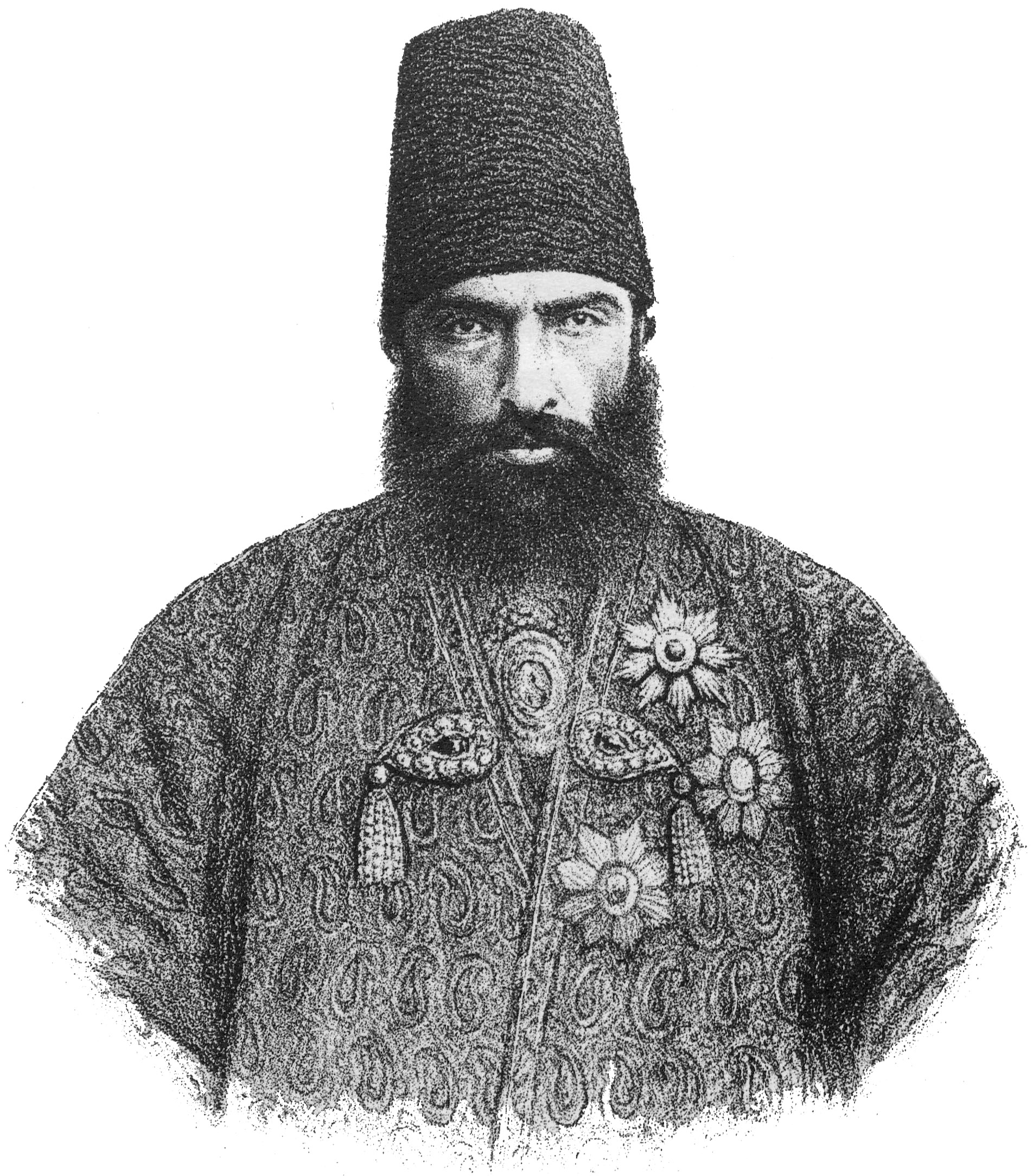
Illustration of Azod ol-Molk by Abu Torab Ghaffari, dated 1883

During the Tobacco Protest of 1891–1892, Azod ol-Molk served as vital mediator between Naser al-Din Shah and Ulama of Tehran. Because of his deep personal piety, he commanded great respect among religious establishment, making him an invaluable asset to beleaguered monarch during the crisis. His high standing persisted into the reign of Mozaffar ad-Din Shah, who held him in special esteem.

=== Under Mohammad Ali Shah ===
His relations with Mohammad Ali Mirza (later Shah) were not cordial. During the Persian Constitutional Revolution, his house was occasionally gathering place for moderate constitutionalists. On one occasion when shah angrily rejected his advice, he walked out of royal presence and as an expression of his displeasure went straight to Sulaymaniyah.

== Later career and death ==
After deposition of Mohammad Ali Shah on 16 July 1909, Azod ol-Molk was appointed Regent because young age of Ahmad Shah. As senior dignitary and chief of the Qajar tribe, he enjoyed respect of the constitutionalists and was in good relationship with the Ulama. He served as regent for one year and three months until death on 22 September 1910.

== Sources ==
- Ardakani, Hosayn Mahbubi (1988). "ʿAŻOD-AL-MOLK, ʿALĪ REŻĀ KHAN". In Yarshater, Ehsan (ed.). Encyclopædia Iranica (Online ed.). Encyclopædia Iranica Foundation.
- E'temad os-Saltaneh, Mohammad Hasan Khan (1966). Afshar, Iraj (ed.). روزنامه خاطرات اعتمادالسلطنه [The Diary of E'temad al-Saltaneh] (in Persian). Tehran: Amir Kabir Publishers.
- E'temad os-Saltaneh, Mohammad Hasan Khan (1881). تاریخ منتظم ناصری [The Naseri Chronological History] (in Persian). Vol. 3.
- Taqafi, Khalil (1905). مقالات گوناگون [Miscellaneous Articles] (in Persian). Tehran: Matba'eh-ye Sharafat.
- Dowlatabadi, Yahya (1983). حیات یحیی [The Life of Yahya] (in Persian). Vol. 2. Tehran: Attar & Ferdowsi.
