= Solayman Khan Saham al-Dowleh =

Iranian-Armenian statesman (1782/83–1853)

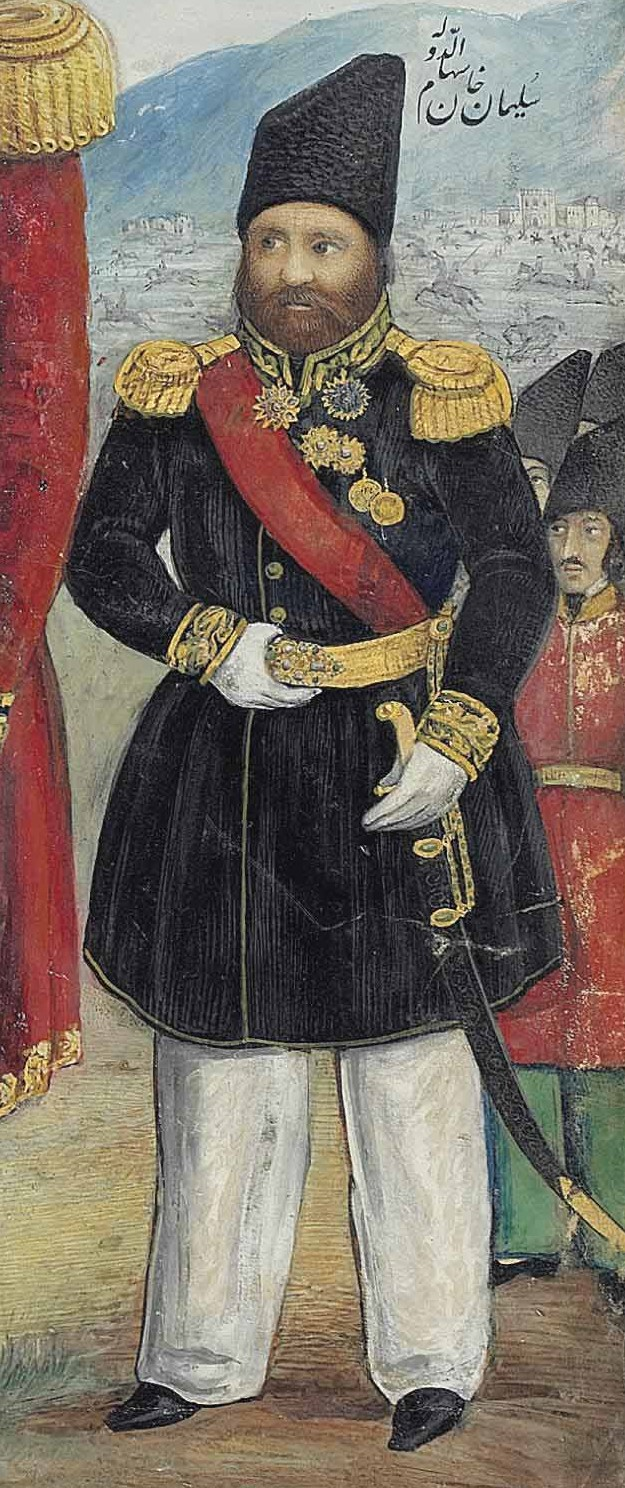
- Solayman Khan Saham al-Dowleh (detail) and Ardashir Mirza review their troops by Sani ol-Mulk, 1850–1851
- Born: 1782/83; Tbilisi, Georgia
- Died: January 1853; Qajar Iran
- Children: Nariman Khan Qavam al-Saltaneh; Jahangir Khan Ajudanbashi; Unnamed daughter who married Ernest Cloquet
- Relatives: Gurgen (brother); Aghalar Beg (uncle); Manuchehr Khan Gorji (uncle)

Solayman Khan Saham al-Dowleh (Persian: سلیمان‌خان سهام‌الدوله; 1782/83 – January 1853) was a nobleman from the Enikolopian family, who served as a government official in Qajar Iran.

His family were distinguished Armenians who had moved to Georgia in the 17th century and became official translators for the Georgian king. After fleeing the 1795 Iranian attack on Tbilisi, Solayman Khan joined the Russian army. Facing forced relocation and conversion, he moved to Iran around 1811 with his companions, eventually joining the army of the Iranian crown prince Abbas Mirza and rising to the rank of major. He later served as vizier under prince Ardashir Mirza. Solayman Khan died in January 1853, leaving behind two sons, Nariman Khan Qavam al-Saltaneh and Jahangir Khan Ajudanbashi, and a daughter married to French doctor Ernest Cloquet.

== Biography ==
A member of the Enikolopian family, he was the son of Mirza Rostom and had a brother named Gurgen/Giorgi. His forebears were renowned Armenians who moved from Armenia to Georgia in the 17th century and worked as official translators for the Georgian king. After the relocation, the family changed their name from Mamkiniyan to Inikulub/Enikolopiant, which in Georgian means "box of languages" and attests to the family's linguistic skill.

Solayman Khan was twelve or thirteen years old when Tbilisi was attacked in 1795 by the Qajar shah (king) of Iran, Agha Mohammad Khan Qajar (r. 1789–1797). He managed to flee with tremendous effort, and following the dissolution of the Georgian kingdom, he enlisted in the Russian army and rose to the rank of officer. Solayman Khan soon learned of their impending forced relocation to Russia and the forced conversation that would follow. At that time, the religious climate was precarious. The Georgian Church was essentially disbanded in 1811 when Anton II, the last Georgian Catholicos of eastern Georgia, was deported to Russia. The ardent pro-Russian Armenian cleric Nerses, on the other hand, relocated in Tbilisi and launched a vigorous campaign to promote Armenian identity and unity. Solayman Khan was likewise in need of funds. Because his family members refused to assist him with the funeral of his mother, he was in debt.

After a few years, Solayman Khan moved to Iran with his companions, the Georgian brothers David Saginean and Zaal Saginean, who were similarly concerned about being coerced into conversion. Solayman Khan and David requested permission to travel to Tbilisi from his senior commander in the early months of 1811. They were allowed to leave because the officer believed they wanted to participate in a wrestling match. They reached Tabriz after first traveling to Yerevan via Akhalkalaki and Gyumri. Since no one knew they were coming, they were not welcomed. Additionally, they surprised an Armenian priest by beginning to pray when they encountered him along with Solayman Khan's uncle Aghalar Beg. Just a week prior to their arrival, Solayman Khan's father Mirza Rostom had died. Solayman Khan was aided by Aghalar Beg in joining the army of the Iranian crown prince Abbas Mirza, and in 1821 he was promoted to major. While the prince Ardashir Mirza was governing the provinces of Khuzestan and Lorestan, he appointed Solayman Khan as his vizier.

== Death and offspring ==
Solayman Khan died in January 1853. He was survived by two sons; Nariman Khan Qavam al-Saltaneh (1830–?), who served as an interpreter in the Iranian court; and Jahangir Khan Ajudanbashi (1834–1891), who held an important role in the politics of Iran during the second half of the 19th century. He had one daughter, who was married to the shah's court physician, the French doctor Ernest Cloquet (died 1855).

== Sources ==
- Ardakani, H. Mahbubi (1986). "Ardašīr Mīrzā". In Yarshater, Ehsan (ed.). Encyclopædia Iranica. Vol. II/4: Architecture IV–Armenia and Iran IV. London and New York: Routledge & Kegan Paul. p. 383. ISBN 978-0-71009-104-8.
- Kondo, Nobuaki (2004). "The Vaqf and Religious Patronage of Manūchihr Khān Muʿtamad al-Dawlah". In Gleave, Robert (ed.). Religion and Society in Qajar Iran. Routledge. pp. 227–244. ISBN 978-0415338141.
- Maeda, Hirotake (2019). "Lives of the Enikolopians: Multilingualism and the Religious-National Identity of a Caucasus Family in the Persianate World". In Amanat, Abbas; Ashraf, Assef (eds.). The Persianate World: Rethinking a Shared Sphere. Brill. pp. 169–195. ISBN 978-90-04-38728-7.
