= Nariman Khan Qavam al-Saltaneh =

Iranian Armenian politician

Iranian ambassador to Austria-Hungary
- In office 1879–1903
- Monarchs: Naser al-Din Shah Qajar; Mozaffar ad-Din Shah Qajar

Personal details
- Born: 1830
- Died: ?
- Children: Anna
- Parent: Solayman Khan Saham al-Dowleh (father)
- Relatives: Jahangir Khan Ajudanbashi (brother); Manuchehr Khan Gorji (great-uncle)

Nariman Khan Qavam al-Saltaneh (Persian: نریمان‌خان قوام‌السلطنه) was an Iranian Armenian politician from the Enikolopian family, who served as the Iranian consul in Egypt in 1873 and the Iranian ambassador to Austria-Hungary from 1879 to 1903.

His daughter Anna was in a love affair with the Iranian painter Kamal-ol-molk, leading to their marriage in 1901, even though Nariman Khan was against it. However, they soon divorced.

== Sources ==
- Algar, Hamid (2023) [1973]. Mirza Malkum Khan: A Biographical Study in Iranian Modernism. University of California Press. ISBN 978-0520022171.
- Ashraf, Ahmad; Diba, Layla (2020) [2010]. "Kamāl-al-Molk, Moḥammad Ḡaffāri". Encyclopaedia Iranica Online. Brill. doi:10.1163/2330-4804_EIRO_COM_10699.
- History section (2018). "آجودان باشی". The Great Islamic Encyclopaedia (in Persian).
- Maeda, Hirotake (2019). "Lives of the Enikolopians: Multilingualism and the Religious-National Identity of a Caucasus Family in the Persianate World". In Amanat, Abbas; Ashraf, Assef (eds.). The Persianate World: Rethinking a Shared Sphere. Brill. pp. 169–195. ISBN 978-90-04-38728-7.
