= Amir-Aslan Khan Majd od-Dowleh =

Qajar prince (?-1909)

Amir-Aslan Khan
- Amid ol-Molk; Majd od-Dowleh
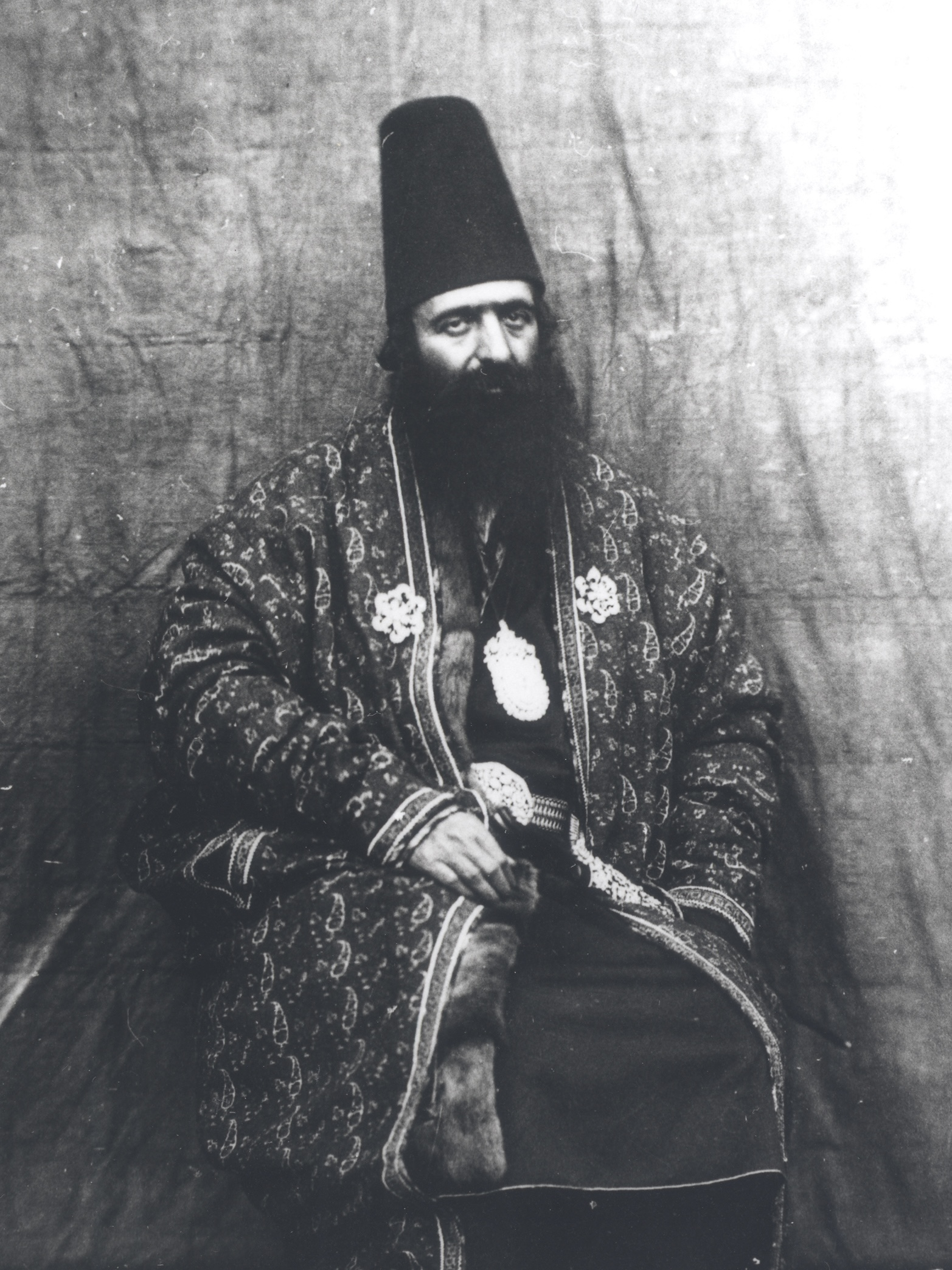
- Majd od-Dowleh, Golestan Palace library

Governor of Gilan
- Tenure: 1853–1857
- Predecessor: Isa Khan Vali
- Successor: Ardashir Mirza
- Monarch: Naser al-Din Shah Qajar
- Died: 1909; Tehran, Qajar Iran
- House: Amirsoleimani
- Dynasty: Qajar
- Father: Mohammad-Qasem Khan Amirsoleimani

Amir-Aslan Khan Majd od-Dowleh (Persian: امیراصلان‌ خان مجدالدوله; ? – 1909) was an Qajar prince, statesman and court official of Qajar era. He was son of Mohammad-Qasem Khan Amirsoleimani and brother of Malek Jahan Khanom.

== Biography ==
=== In Tabriz ===
Amir-Aslan Khan was one of the close attendants of Tabriz to Mohammad Mirza (later Mohammad Shah Qajar). In 1847, when Crown prince Naser al-Din Mirza (later Shah) replaced Bahman Mirza as governor of Azerbaijan, Amir-Aslan Khan was given to service of Crown prince as Eshik-aqasi-bashi (Master of ceremonies).

=== Fars revolt ===
In 1848, People of Fars rebelled against Hossein Khan Ajudanbashi, the governor of Fars for opposition and lack of favor Grand vizier Amir Kabir, At the instigation of Mirza Ali-Akbar Khan Qavam al-Molk Shirazi and Mohammad-Qoli Khan Ilbegi Qashqai. The revolt resulted in fierce fighting between them and the government forces. At the Shah's order, Amir Kabir sent Amir-Aslan Khan to Shiraz for suppress rebellion. He failed to make any progress and returned to Tehran. He was replaced by Ahmad Khan Navaei Amid ol-Molk as Eshik-aqasi-bashi.

Majd od-Dowleh was serving as the governor of Zanjan when Báb emerged. During his tenure, the Bábí movement in Zanjan was initiated by Mullah Mohammad-Ali Zanjani. Although Majd od-Dowlh initially treated Mohammad-Ali with leniency.

=== Governor of Gilan ===
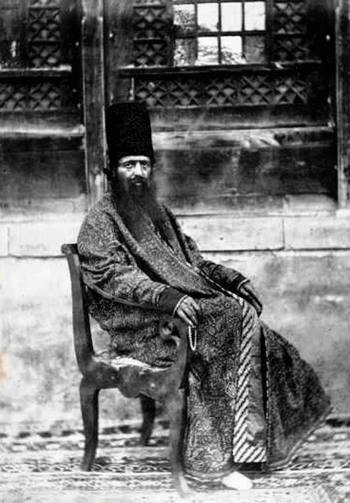
Photograph of Majd od-Dowleh by Luigi Montabone taken around 1860.

Excessive taxes imposed by Qajar governors provoked several popular uprisings, among them In 1851 rebels sacked the house of governor, Isa Khan Vali E'temad ol-Dowleh brother of Majd ed-Dowleh. In 1853 Majd od-Dowleh replaced Isa Khan Vali as governor of Gilan. In 1857, Majd od-Doweh replaced by Ardashir Mirza Rokn od-Dowleh, the son of Crown prince Abbas Mirza.

== Sources ==
- Bamdad, Mehdi (1992). شرح حال رجال ایران در قرن ۱۲ و ۱۳ و ۱۴ هجری [Biographies of Iranian Notables in the 12th, 13th and 14th Hijri Centuries] (in Persian). Vol. 1 (4th ed.). Tehran: Ketabforushi-ye Zovvar.
- Fasai, Mirza Hasan Hosayni (1988). Rastgar Fasai, Mansur (ed.). فارسنامه ناصری [The Naseri Book of Fars] (in Persian). Tehran: Amir Kabir Publishers.
- Haghshenas, Ali. "نقش امیراصلان خان مجدالدوله در بابیت" [The Role of Amir-Aslan Khan Majd al-Dowleh in Bábism] (in Persian).
- Rabino, Hyacinth Louis (1917). Les provinces caspiennes de la Perse: Le Guîlân [The Caspian Provinces of Persia: Gilan] (in French). Paris: E. Leroux.

Preceded by Isa Vali Khan	Governor of Gilan; 1853–1857	Succeeded by Ardashir Mirza
Preceded by ?	Master of Ceremonies (Eshik-aqasi-bashi) for Naser al-Din Mirza; 1847–1848	Succeeded by Ahmad Khan Navaei Amid ol-Molk
