= Manuchehr Khan Gorji =

Governor of Isfahan, Qajar Iran (died 1847)

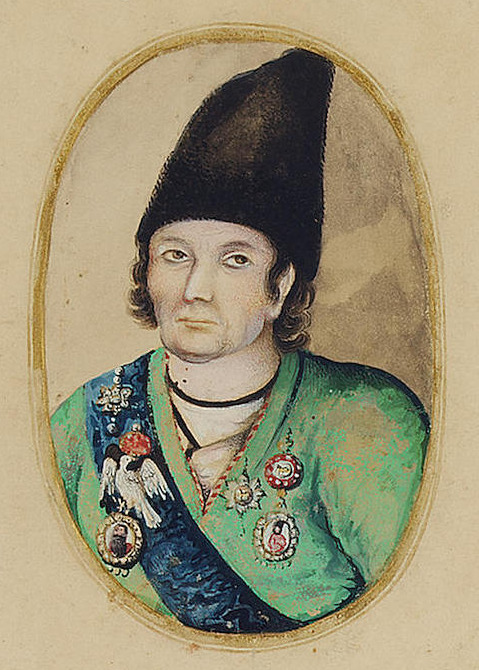
- Portrait of Manuchehr Khan Gorji in the style of Mohammad Isma'il. Dated 1840

Governor of Isfahan
- In office 1838 – 9 February 1847
- Monarch: Mohammad Shah Qajar

Personal details
- Born: 18th-century Tbilisi, Georgia
- Died: 9 February 1847 Isfahan, Qajar Iran
- Resting place: Fatima Masumeh Shrine
- Parent: Mirza Gurgen Khan (father)
- Relatives: Abraham Enikolopian (brother); Solayman Khan Saham al-Dowleh (nephew); Nariman Khan Qavam al-Saltaneh (great-nephew); Jahangir Khan Ajudanbashi (great-nephew)

Manuchehr Khan Gorji Mo'tamed al-Dowleh (Persian: منوچهر خان گرجی معتمدالدوله; died 9 February 1847) was a eunuch in Qajar Iran, who became one of the most powerful statesmen of the country in the first half of the 19th century.

== Background ==
A member of the Enikolopian family and the aznauri nobility class, Manuchehr Khan was born as Chongur Enikolopiant in the city of Tbilisi in Georgia. His father was Mirza Gurgen Khan, a seasoned diplomat who served under the Georgian kings. His mother Voskum Khanum was from the city of Hamadan and the daughter of a certain Hakobjan Agha Amatun.

Although Manuchehr Khan was frequently referred with the nisba of "Gorji" (Georgian) and also reported as a "Georgian purchased as a slave" by his acquaintance Austen Henry Layard, he was in reality an Armenian. His forebears were renowned Armenians who moved from Armenia to Georgia in the 17th century and worked as official translators for the Georgian king. After the relocation, the family changed their name from Mamkiniyan to Inikulub/Enikolopiant, which in Georgian means "box of languages" and attests to the family's linguistic skill. Armenians played a significant part in Georgian history from the 16th to the 18th centuries, and numerous courtiers of Armenian ancestry worked as writers and interpreters for the Georgian kings. The Enikolopians began learning languages while they were young, and they frequently served in diplomatic positions thanks to their command of Armenian, Georgian, Persian, Turkish, and Arabic.

According to certain Persian texts, Manuchehr Khan's forebears were viziers of Georgian vice-kings under the Safavid shahs (kings) of Iran. This story is made up and was written to boost Manuchehr Khan's reputation. The author of the anthology Mada'ih al-mu'tamadiyya tried to connect him to Iranian kingship by claiming that he was a descendant of Khosrow I (r. 531–579), the king of the pre-Islamic Sasanian Empire. According to the Japanese historian Nobuaki Kondo, "It must have been too difficult for the author to link Manuchehr Khan with the prophet Muhammad, or any other Islamic saints."

The family made a conscious effort to establish connections with the government and religious community of Iran, as well as Russia.

== Career ==
=== Service in the Georgian volunteer army ===
In 1804, a war erupted between Iran and Russia, when the Russians seized the city of Ganja, which had been governed by the Ganja Khanate of Iran. In the same year, one of the forces that fought under the Russian commander Pavel Tsitsianov during the Russian siege of Erivan was a volunteer army of Georgian nobility commanded by Ivane Orbeliani. However, after a disagreement between the two, Orbeliani chose to withdraw his forces back to Georgia. The Iranian army, commanded by Pir-Qoli Khan Qajar and Ali-Qoli Khan Shahsevan, ambushed them as they were leaving Erivan on August 4 with a sizable caravan. They captured many Georgians who were part of the aznauri class, including Chongur Enikolopiant. Along with three Russians and two other Armenian youngsters (Andre Ghaytmazeants, later Khosrow Khan Gorji, and Hakob/Ya'qub Margarean, later Agha Ya'qub), he was delivered to Fath-Ali Shah Qajar (r. 1797–1834), the Qajar shah of Iran.

=== Service in the Iranian government ===
==== Early career and rise ====
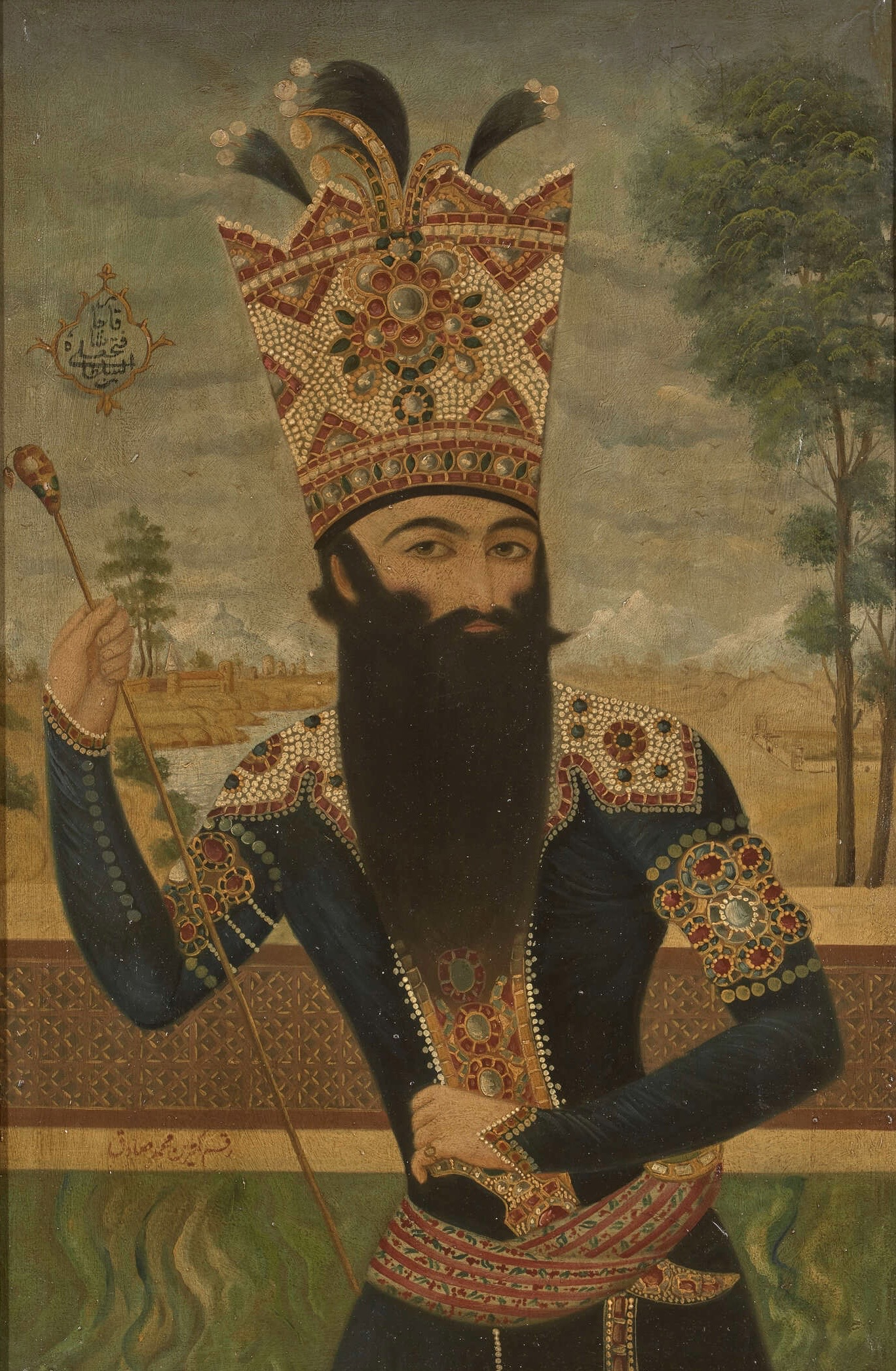
Portrait of Fath-Ali Shah Qajar (r. 1797–1834) by Mohammad Sadeq

Chongur Enikolopiant was given the Persian name Jansuz ("soul inflaming"), castrated, converted to Islam and started working as a eunuch in the court. He soon rose the position of chief eunuch (ich-aqasi-bashi) and became a close advisor to Fath-Ali Shah, who rewarded him with the title of "khan" and the more prestigious Iranian name "Manuchehr", which was also the name of a shah of the Pishdadian dynasty.

Most Persian sources describe Manuchehr Khan as a ghulam, which indicates that he probably held the status of a slave. He referred himself as "Manoochehr Khan, Fatteh Ali Shahee" in a document he had written in 1822, which demonstrates that he was a slave of Fath-Ali Shah. Kondo states that "We can assume that his early career was quite similar to that of any slave elite member in the medieval Middle East." He had the responsibility of leading more than 500 eunuchs, including Georgians, Turks, and Kurds, who were responsible for protecting the royal harem. No prince or princess could enter the royal castle without his approval since he oversaw the entrance doors. Each day at lunch and dinner, he brought a bowl of water for washing hands and a pot of drinking water to the royal harem. He also always accompanied Fath-Ali Shah when he left the palace. He occasionally engaged in sports with the princes in the harem. He was referred to as "my partner" by Fath-Ali Shah.

In addition to his skills and distinctive heritage as an Armeno-Georgian aristocratic Manuchehr Khan occasionally received help from his first relatives. The Qajar slave system was more reliant on the shah's character than the Safavid system, which is known for its systematic inclusion and integration of Caucasian local elites. In contrast to the pre-existing slave-soldiers framework, Manuchehr Khan's rise explicitly shows the Iranian model of the slave elite system, where familial and local connections were essential.

Manuchehr Khan later assumed the responsibilities of the minister Mirza Shafi Mazandarani, who had become unable to handle them due to his old age. In 1824, Manuchehr Khan was appointed as the vizier of Yahya Mirza, the governor of Gilan. Manuchehr Khan served as the de facto governor of the province as Yahya Mirza was too young to do so.

==== The war with Russia and its aftermath ====
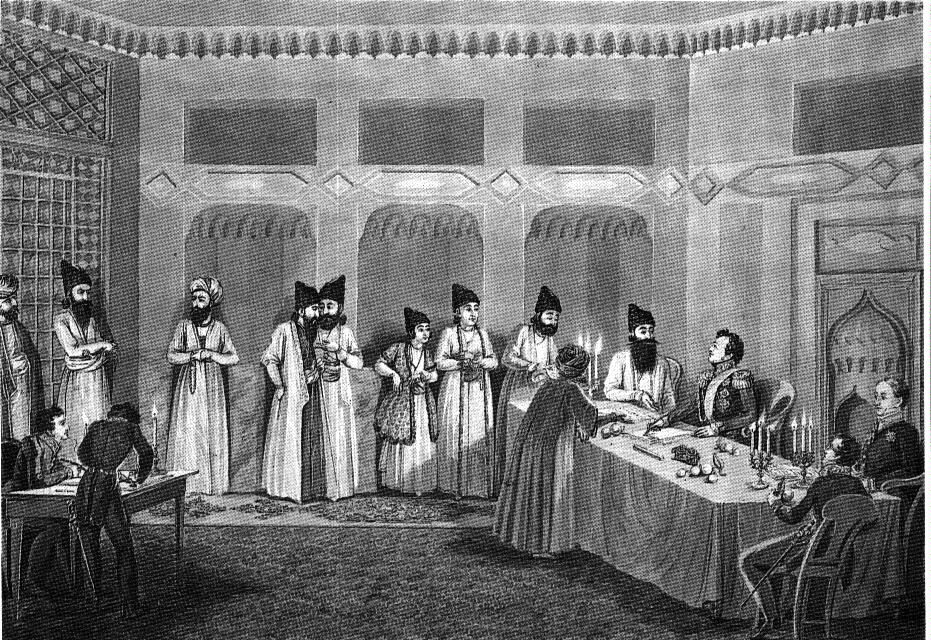
Signing ceremony of the Treaty of Turkmenchay

In Fath-Ali Shah's court, two factions had developed during the course of building policy toward Russia. One faction advocated for peace with Russia, and the other for war. Both were heavily lobbying Fath-Ali Shah and Abbas Mirza. The first question at hand was what to do if Russia did not stop their occupation of Gokcha and Balagh-lu. The state of the Muslim minority under Russian authority and, lastly, whether and to what extent Russia had been weakened as a result of its internal crises, were secondary concerns.

Manuchehr Khan was amongst those who advocated for peace, alongside other prominent figures such as the chief scribe Neshat Isfahani; the foreign minister Mirza Abolhassan Khan Ilchi; and the court translator and envoy Mirza Saleh Shirazi. In general, the peace party feared the capability of the Russian Empire and wanted armed conflict to be avoided at all costs. They were more accustomed to dealing with people from other cultures and knew more about Russia. The Iranians eventually lost the second war with the Russians, and were thus forced to sign the Treaty of Turkmenchay on 28 February 1828, in which they agreed to cede Erivan and Nakhichevan. Using Manuchehr Khan's advise, Fath-Ali Shah had avoided assigning Iranian natives to the first delegation during the peace treaty talks in the Turkmanchay village. Instead, he assigned it to Muslim convert Bizhan Khan, who performed well. Additionally, Manuchehr Khan attended the peace treaty talks held in Turkmanchay and was responsible for preparing and transporting the war-loss payment for the Russians there.

In 1829, the distinguished Russian poet and author Alexander Griboyedov led a sizable Russian embassy to Tehran in order to deliver the signed treaty and handling other matters, such as war reparations. There Griboyedov showed the condescending behaviour of a conqueror toward the Iranians when enforcing the conditions of the Treaty of Turkmenchay. He ordered that the Georgian concubines who were held in the harems of the Qajars (including those of the former prime minister Asef al-Dowleh) be released into his care. He had done this at the urging of Agha Ya'qub, who wanted to return to his homeland. Griboyedov dispatched his Armenian and Georgian assistants to deliver the Georgian concubines to the Russian embassy, relying on a clause in the Treaty of Turkmenchay that called for the trading of prisoners of war. Griboyedov was told by Manuchehr Khan to abandon the legation because he was in danger, but he declined. The clergy incited a mob to attack the Russian legation the following day (10 February), which they did, killing all but one of its sizable staff.

==== Governorship of the western and central provinces of Iran ====
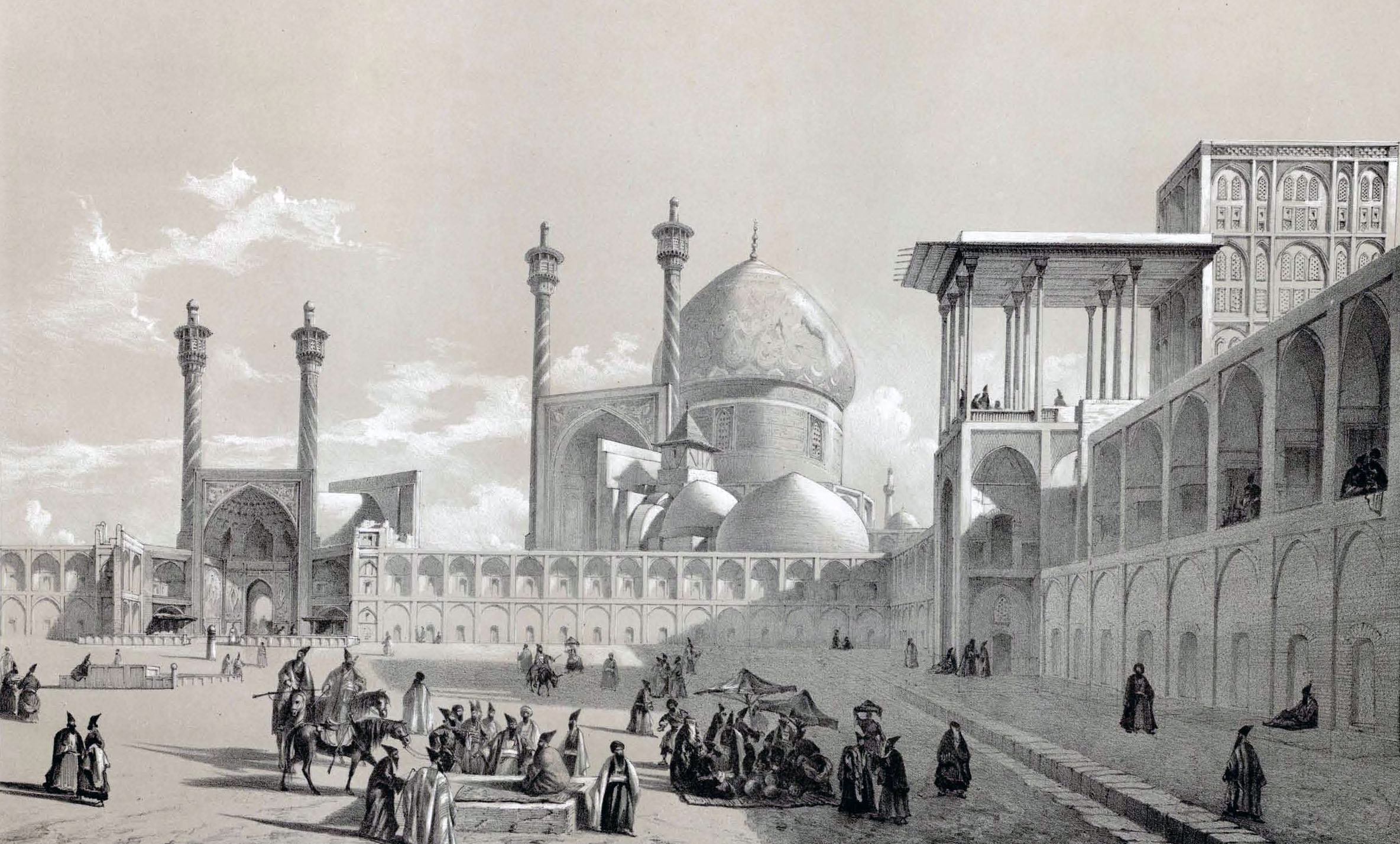
Illustration of Isfahan, dated 1840

On 8 June 1829, Neshat Isfahani died, and thus his title of "Mo'tamed al-Dowleh" ("Trustee of the State") was passed on to Manuchehr Khan by Fath-Ali Shah.

In 1837, the governor of Kermanshah, Bahram Mirza, who was also the brother of then incumbent king Mohammad Shah Qajar (r. 1834–1848), was recalled to the Iranian capital of Tehran after complaints by the people of his governorate. Manuchehr Khan was subsequently appointed as the new governor of Kermanshah. In 1838, he was given the governorship of Isfahan, an office he would keep until his death. In 1839, the entire Isfahan Province was added to the domain of Manuchehr Khan, which already included Kermanshah, Khuzestan, and Lorestan. As a result, "he became in effect the viceroy of much central and southwestern Iran and delegated authority in Kermanshah to a series of subordinate governors". Around the same time, still in the 1830s, Manuchehr Khan was responsible for the establishment of a central court of justice in Isfahan, which had both secular and religious judges, and in its implementation was "roughly resembling the historical mazalem court".

The court however, was disbanded due to the presented opposition of those who found it to be working against their personal interests. When The Báb arrived in Isfahan in 1846, Manuchehr offered him protection, and his vast wealth, and allegedly offered military services to conquer Iran and spread his teachings into the country and even beyond it. The Báb reportedly declined the offer, but accepted the governor's protection. Manuchehr Khan died shortly thereafter and The Báb, left without an influential patron, fell in disfavor with the shah.

Manuchehr Khan died in Isfahan on 9 February 1847. He was buried in the Fatima Masumeh Shrine in Qom, the same place where Fath-Ali Shah was buried.

== Business endeavors ==
Together with Khosrow Khan Gorji and Agha Ya'qub, Manuchehr Khan began important commercial endeavors. The Armenian historian Galust Shermazanian reported that Manuchehr Khan used Stefan of New Julfa and Samuel of Tbilisi as his proxies. This demonstrates the significance of the local and ethnic backgrounds of the slave elites. Through Tabriz, Astrakhan, Rasht, Constantinople, Baghdad, Bushehr, Madras, and Calcutta, their Armenian trading network spanned the all of Iran and the neighboring lands.

Together with his peers, Manuchehr Khan established a business to buy jewelry for the ladies of the royal harem at affordable costs. This business enjoyed great success up until its dissolution in 1819. In order to acquire gifts to give to Fath-Ali Shah in the hopes of becoming appointed to positions of authority in the provinces, Manuchehr Khan would loan the business' income to courtiers. In Tehran, he gained recognition as the deputy of the provincial governors. A document from 1822 shows that Manuchehr Khan made a major acquisition by paying 48,565 toman to the chief merchant of Baghdad, Elias Antoon. What he purchased, is unknown. He became one of the richest men in the country by investing the money he earned from his business ventures in both urban and rural properties.

== Sources ==
- Amanat, Abbas (1997). Pivot of the Universe: Nasir Al-Din Shah Qajar and the Iranian Monarchy, 1831-1896. I.B.Tauris. ISBN 978-1845118280.
- Amanat, Abbas (1999). "Fatḥ-ʿAlī Shah Qājār". In Yarshater, Ehsan (ed.). Encyclopædia Iranica. Vol. IX/4: Fārs II–Fauna III. London and New York: Routledge & Kegan Paul. pp. 407–421. ISBN 978-0-933273-32-0.
- Amanat, Abbas (2017). Iran: A Modern History. Yale University Press. ISBN 978-0300112542.
- Bayat, Mangol (1982). Mysticism and Dissent: Socioreligious Thought in Qajar Iran. Syracuse University Press. p. 95. ISBN 0815628536.
- Behrooz, Maziar (2023). Iran at War: Interactions with the Modern World and the Struggle with Imperial Russia. I.B. Tauris. ISBN 978-0755637379.
- Bournoutian, George (2016). "Prelude to War: The Russian Siege and Storming of the Fortress of Ganjeh, 1803–4". Iranian Studies. 50 (1). Taylor & Francis: 107–124. doi:10.1080/00210862.2016.1159779. S2CID 163302882.
- Calmard, Jean (2015). "Kermansah iv. History from the Arab Conquest to 1953". Encyclopaedia Iranica.
- Floor, Willem (2009). "Judicial and Legal Systems iv. Judicial System From the Advent of Islam Through the 19th Century". Encyclopaedia Iranica.
- Hambly, Gavin R. G. (1991). "Iran during the reigns of Fath 'Alī Shāh and Muhammad Shāh". In Avery, Peter; Hambly, Gavin R. G.; Melville, Charles Peter (eds.). The Cambridge History of Iran: From Nadir Shah to the Islamic Republic. Vol. 7. Cambridge: Cambridge University Press. pp. 144–173. ISBN 0-521-20095-4.
- Javadi, H. (1982). "ʿAbd-al-Vahhāb Moʿtamad-al-dawla". In Yarshater, Ehsan (ed.). Encyclopædia Iranica. Vol. I/2: ʿAbd-al-Hamīd–ʿAbd-al-Hamīd. London and New York: Routledge & Kegan Paul. pp. 170–171. ISBN 978-0-71009-091-1.
- Kondo, Nobuaki (2004). "The Vaqf and Religious Patronage of Manūchihr Khān Muʿtamad al-Dawlah". In Gleave, Robert (ed.). Religion and Society in Qajar Iran. Routledge. pp. 227–244. ISBN 978-0415338141.
- McCants, William (2004). "Babiyya". In Martín, Richard C. (ed.). Encyclopedia of Islam & the Muslim World, Volume 1. Granite Hill Publishers. ISBN 0028656032.
- Maeda, Hirotake (2019). "Lives of the Enikolopians: Multilingualism and the Religious-National Identity of a Caucasus Family in the Persianate World". In Amanat, Abbas; Ashraf, Assef (eds.). The Persianate World: Rethinking a Shared Sphere. Brill. pp. 169–195. ISBN 978-90-04-38728-7.
- Pourjavady, Reza (2023). "Russo-Iranian wars 1804-13 and 1826-8". Christian-Muslim Relations. A Bibliographical History Volume 20. Iran, Afghanistan and the Caucasus (1800-1914). Brill.
- Walcher, Heidi (2006). "Isfahan viii. Qajar Period". Encyclopaedia Iranica, Vol. XIII, Fasc. 6. pp. 657–675.
