= Jahangir Khan Ajudanbashi =

- Born: 1834
- Died: 23 August 1891 (aged 56–57); Qajar Iran
- Father: Solayman Khan Saham al-Dowleh
- Relatives: Nariman Khan Qavam al-Saltaneh (brother); Manuchehr Khan Gorji (great-uncle)

Jahangir Khan Ajudanbashi (1834–1891) was an Iranian Armenian military officer and diplomat from the Enikolopian family, who was active during the reign of the Qajar shah (king) Naser al-Din Shah Qajar (r. 1848–1896). He was the son of Solayman Khan Saham al-Dowleh, who had relocated to Iran from Tiflis. Because of Solayman Khan's reputation, Jahangir Khan was able to win Naser al-Din Shah's support and make substantial progress in his career. Jahangir died on 23 August 1891.

== Sources ==
- History section (2018). "آجودان باشی". The Great Islamic Encyclopaedia (in Persian).
- Maeda, Hirotake (2019). "Lives of the Enikolopians: Multilingualism and the Religious-National Identity of a Caucasus Family in the Persianate World". In Amanat, Abbas; Ashraf, Assef (eds.). The Persianate World: Rethinking a Shared Sphere. Brill. pp. 169–195. ISBN 978-90-04-38728-7.
