= Gholam Reza Pahlavi =

Iranian royal and army official (1923–2017)

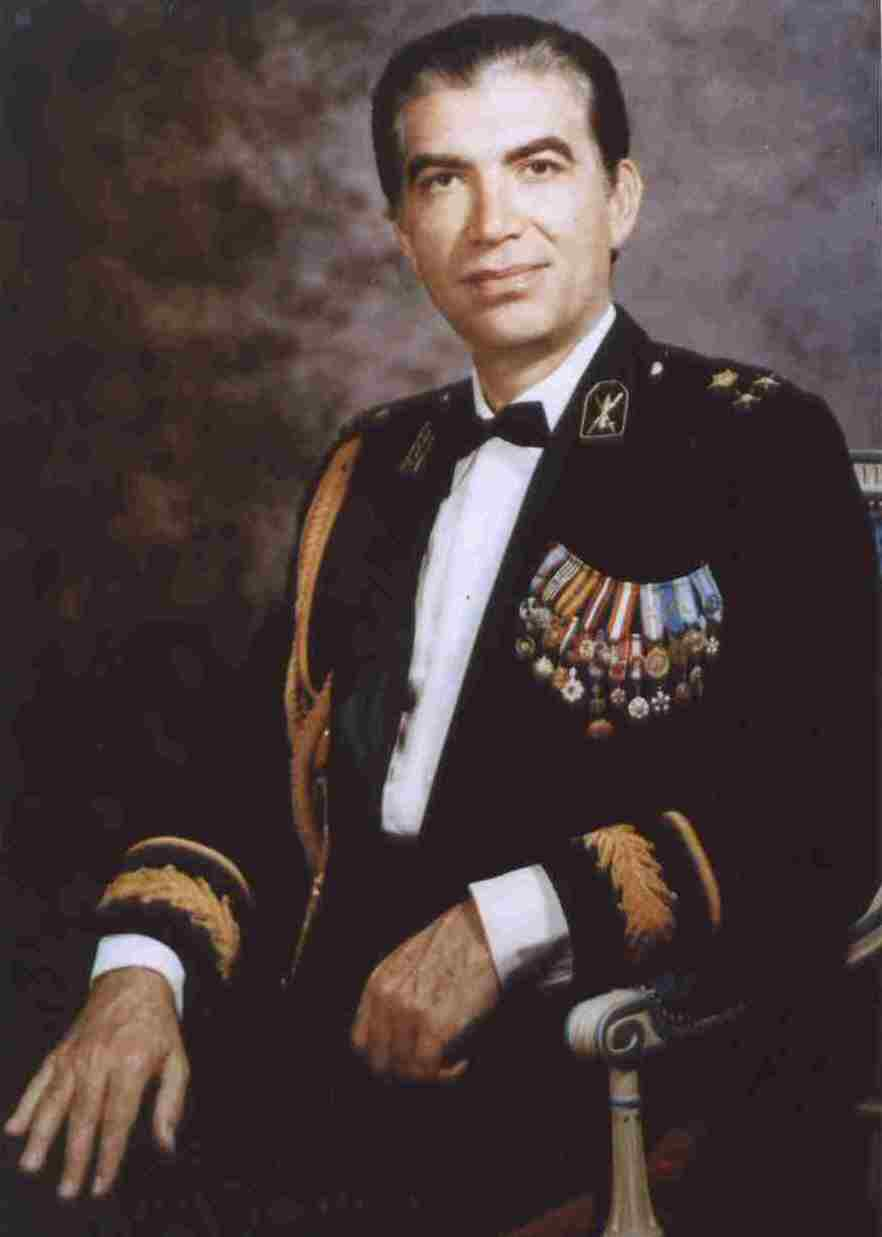
- Prince Gholamreza in 1966
- Born: 15 May 1923; Tehran, Qajar Iran
- Died: 7 May 2017 (aged 93); Paris, France
- Burial: Cimetière parisien de Thiais, Paris
- Spouse: Homa Aalam (m. 1947; div. 1956); Manijeh Jahanbani (m. 1962)
- Issue: List: Mehrnaz; Bahman; Azardokht; Maryam; Bahram
- House: Pahlavi; Amirsoleimani
- Father: Reza Shah
- Mother: Turan Amirsoleimani
- Military career
- Allegiance: Pahlavi Iran
- Branch: Imperial Iranian Ground Forces
- Service years: 1945–1973
- Rank: Lieutenant General

Gholam Reza Pahlavi (Persian: غلامرضا پهلوی; 15 May 1923 – 7 May 2017) was an Iranian prince and a member of the Pahlavi dynasty, as the son of Reza Shah and half-brother of Mohammad Reza Pahlavi, the last Shah of Iran.

Following the death of his half-sister Ashraf Pahlavi on 7 January 2016, Gholam Reza became the only living child of Reza Shah. He resided in Paris with his family. He died on 7 May 2017 at the age of 93.

== Early life and education ==
Pahlavi was born in Golestan Palace, Tehran, on 15 May 1923. He was the fifth child and third son of Reza Shah, the founder of the Iranian Pahlavi dynasty. His mother, Turan (Qamar ol-Molouk) Amirsoleimani, was related to the Qajar dynasty deposed in 1925 in favor of Reza Shah. More specifically, she was the daughter of a Qajar dignitary, Issa Majd al-Saltaneh. She was also the granddaughter of Majd ed-Dowleh Qajar-Qovanlu Amirsoleimani, Naser al Din Shah's maternal cousin. Gholam Reza's parents married in 1922 and divorced shortly after his birth in 1923.

Pahlavi received primary education in Iran and then went to Switzerland for secondary education at Institut Le Rosey. In 1936, he returned to the country and attended military school. He accompanied his father, Reza Shah, to his exile in British Mauritius when the latter was forced to abdicate in September 1941. In the aftermath of Reza Shah's abdication, the British and Russian envoys attempted to put Gholam Reza on the throne, bypassing Crown Prince Mohammad Reza Pahlavi when their efforts to end the Pahlavi dynasty and reinstate the Qajar dynasty failed. It, however, also did not work. Gholam Reza graduated from Princeton University. In August 1952 while serving in the army Pahlavi joined a fourteen–week military training in Fort Knox, Kentucky.

== Career and activities ==
Upon returning to Iran, Pahlavi attended military officers' training college for a military career. He began his career in Iran's armed forces serving as a First Lieutenant. Then he served as inspector general in the army. After holding different positions in the army he was promoted to the rank of lieutenant General in 1973. He retired from the Iranian army as a brigadier general.

In 1955, he became a member of the International Olympic Committee. He also served as president of the Iranian National Olympic Committee. He was a member of the Royal Council which ruled Iran during the international visits of Mohammad Reza Pahlavi.

In early December 1973, he and his wife officially visited China just before the first Iranian ambassador, Abbas Aram, began to serve in that country. As president of the Iranian national Olympic committee, he supported China's objection to Taiwan's participation in the 1976 Montreal Olympic Games. However, he never tended to play an active role in domestic politics.

During the reign of Mohammad Reza Pahlavi, he owned land in Iran and was a large shareholder in six firms. Gholam Reza Pahlavi was a member of the construction society together with Ashraf Pahlavi and Teymur Bakhtiar. It was established by the Shah to get contracts for municipal and road construction projects, and the members were given certain amounts from the profits. Gholam Reza Pahlavi involved in a corruption case when he took payment from an East European country which made an investment contract with Iran. Following the warning of Iranian economy minister, Alinaghi Alikhani, the Shah ordered him to return the payment.

== Personal life and later years ==
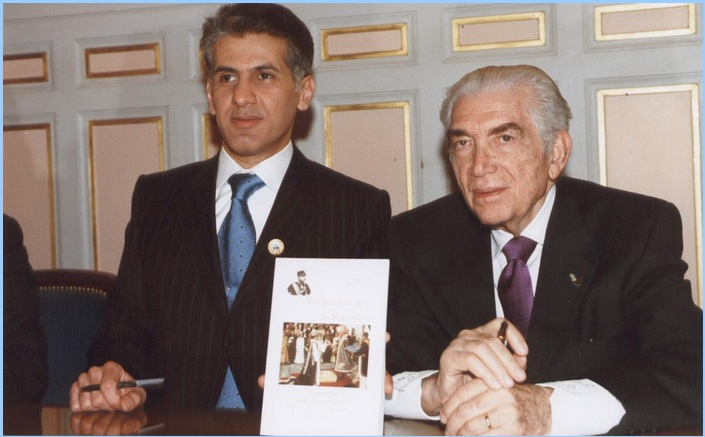
Gholam Reza Pahlavi at a book launch ceremony in Nice, France, 2007

Pahlavi married Homa Aalam (daughter of Amir Farau’llah Khan Aalam, Iran Minister for Education and Minister of Public Works) in 1948 in Tehran. Homas maternal grand-father Mirza Hasan Khan Vossugh had also at one point been the Prime Minister of Iran.

The couple were well-known to each other as Homas father had been the personal doctor to Gholamrezas father. His wife and Pahlavis half-sister Ashraf were also good friends.

They had a daughter, Mehrnaz (born 4 February 1949), and a son, Bahman (born 30 January 1950). They divorced in 1956, and he married Manijeh Jahanbani, a Qajar princess, in Tehran on 6 March 1962. This marriage produced two daughters and a son: Azardokht (Khadijeh) Pahlavi, Maryam (Zahra) Pahlavi and Bahram Pahlavi.

Pahlavi left Iran before the 1979 revolution along with other relatives. He settled in Paris. In the immediate aftermath of the revolution, Ayatollah Sadegh Khalkhali, a religious judge and then chairman of the Revolutionary Court, informed the press that a death sentence was passed on the members of the Pahlavi family, including Gholam Reza and other former Shah officials.

In 1996 Pahlavi was diagnosed with lymphoma. He died at the age of 93 at the American Hospital of Paris on 7 May 2017.

== Book ==
Pahlavi published a book, Mon père, mon frère, les Shahs d'Iran (French: My father, my brother, the Shahs of Iran), in 2005, dealing with both his experiences and thoughts about the future of Iran. The book was published in French and Persian (ISBN 2915685061).

== Honours ==
=== National honours ===
- Knight Grand Cross of the Order of Pahlavi
- Order of Glory
- Order of Military Merit, 2nd class
- Order of Service, 2nd class
- Order of Rashtakhiz, 1st class
- National Uprising Medal [28th Amordad 1332 Medal] (1953)
- Imperial Coronation Medal (26 October 1967)

=== Foreign honours ===
- Order of the Supreme Sun, 1st Class (Kingdom of Afghanistan)
- Knight Grand Cross of Royal Order of Isabella the Catholic (Kingdom of Spain, 1978)
- King Birendra Coronation Medal (Kingdom of Nepal, 24 February 1975)
