= List of mothers of the Qajar shahs =

List of the mothers of the monarchs of Iran's Qajar dynasty

This list includes the biological mothers of the Qajar shahs, some of whom were therefore queen mothers, titled in Persian Mahd-e Olia (Persian: مهد علیا, lit. 'Sublime Cradle'). During the Qajar era (1789–1925) there were six shahs (kings) in 7 generations, all members of the house of Qajar.

Photo	Name	Son	Ethnicity	Place of Origin	Source
	Jeeran Khanum	Mohammad	Ghovanloo Qajar, daughter of Eskandar Khan Qajar-Ghovanloo	Astarabad	
	Agha Baji Khanom, titled Mahd-e Olia	Fath-Ali	Ezz od-Dinlu Qajar, daughter of Mohammad Khan Qajar-Ezz od-Dinlu Beglerbegi of Marv	Marv	
	Assiyeh (Jahan) Khanom, titled Malek Gowhar	Mohammad	Davvaloo Qajar, daughter of Amir Mirza Mohammad Khan Qajar-Davvaloo "Tajbakhsh" Beglerbegi of Qazvin	Qazvin	
	Malek Jahan Khanom, titled Mahd-e Olia	Naser al-Din	Ghovanloo Qajar, daughter of Amir Mohammad Ghassem Khan Qajar-Ghovanloo	Tehran, Sublime State of Iran	
	Shokouh al-Saltaneh Khanom	Mozaffar ad-Din	Ghovanloo Qajar, daughter of Prince Fathollah Mirza Qajar "Sho'a ol-Saltaneh"	Tehran, Sublime State of Iran	
	Taj ol-Molouk Khanom, titled Umm al-Khaqan	Mohammad Ali	Persian - Ghovanloo Qajar, daughter of Mirza Taghi Khan Farahani "Amir Kabir"	Tehran, Sublime State of Iran	
	Zahra Khanom, called Malekeh Jahan	Ahmad	Ghovanloo Qajar, daughter of Prince Kamran Mirza Qajar "Nayeb ol-Saltaneh"	Tehran, Sublime State of Iran	

== See also ==
- Qajar family tree
