= Turan Amirsoleimani =

Iranian aristocrat (1905–1994)

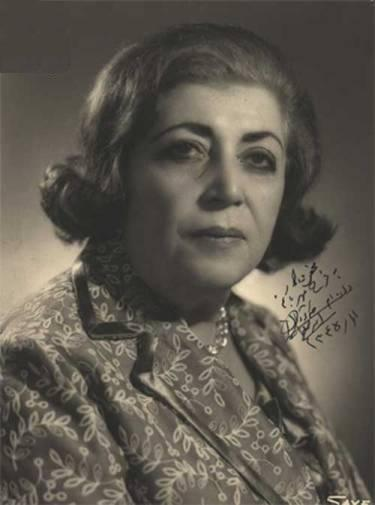
- Turan in 1966
- Born: Qamar ol-Molouk Amirsoleimani; 4 February 1905; Tehran, Qajar Iran
- Died: 24 July 1994 (aged 89); Paris, France
- Burial: Cimetière parisien de Thiais, Paris
- Spouse: Reza Shah (m. 1922; div. 1923) Zabihollah Malekpour (m. 1945)
- Issue: Prince Gholam Reza
- House: Amirsoleimani
- Dynasty: Qajar
- Father: Prince Isa Khan Majd es-Saltaneh Amirsoleimani
- Mother: Shams ol-Molouk Monazzah od-Dowleh

Turan Amirsoleimani (Persian: توران امیرسلیمانی), born Qamar ol-Molouk Amirsoleimani (قمرالملوک امیرسلیمانی; 4 February 1905 – 24 July 1994), was an Iranian aristocrat and the third wife of Reza Shah, with whom she had a son named Gholam Reza Pahlavi.

== Biography ==
Turan was born Qamar ol-Molouk Amirsoleimani in 1905. Her father, Qajar Prince Isa Khan Majd es-Saltaneh Amirsoleimani, was a son of Prince Majd ed-Dowleh, one of the most important politicians during the Qajar era and a first cousin of Naser al-Din Shah Qajar. Her mother, Shams ol-Molouk Monazzah od-Dowleh, was also a member of the Qajar dynasty.

Turan Amirsoleimani completed her education at Namous High School in Tehran, an institution founded in 1908 to advance women's education in Iran, where she earned her diploma at a time when female education was still met with considerable societal resistance.

== Marriage ==
In 1922, she married Reza Khan who was, at the time, minister of war. Reza Khan, though not of noble lineage, sought to strengthen his political position by marrying into a prominent Qajar family. The following year she gave birth to her only son, Gholam Reza Pahlavi. The couple divorced shortly afterwards as Reza Khan considered her arrogant.

After the divorce, Amirsoleimani refrained from remarrying and lived with her son Gholam Reza in a royal residence. In 1945, a year after Reza Shah's death, she married Zabihollah Malekpour, a renowned merchant. Tadj ol-Molouk, Reza Shah's widow and the Queen mother, used this marriage as an excuse to force Amirsoleimani out of the residence given to her by her former husband.

== Later life and death ==
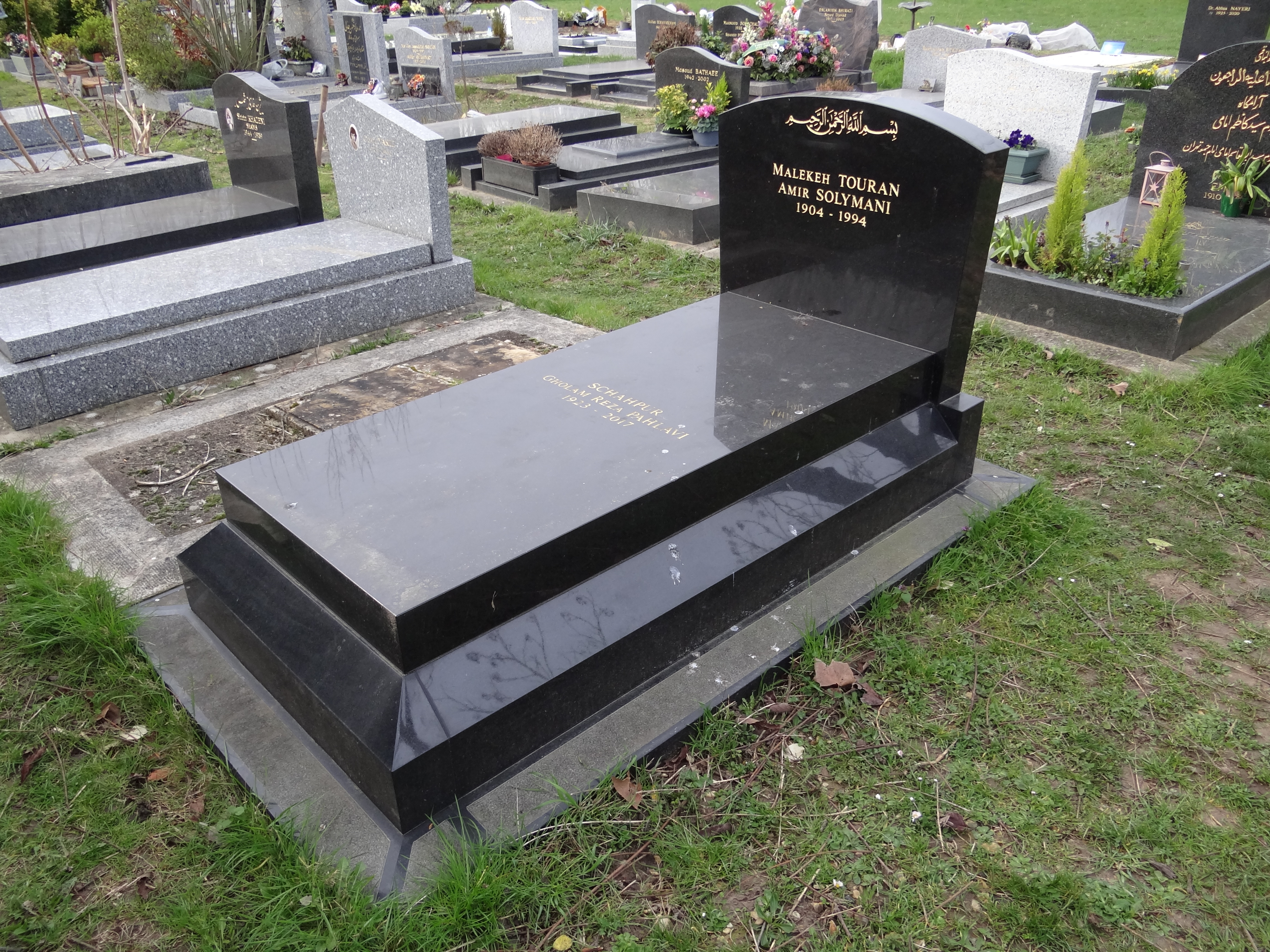
Grave of Turan Amirsoleimani and Gholam Reza Pahlavi

Following the Iranian Revolution in 1979, Amirsoleimani left Iran and moved to West Germany, where she stayed at her cousin Soltan-Mahmoud Amirsoleimani's home for extended periods, before being moved to a retirement home in Paris in her later years. She died there on 24 July 1994 and was buried at the cimetière parisien de Thiais. Her son was buried next to her after his death in 2017.

Amirsoleimani's house in Iran was located on the southwest side of the intersection of Pesyan and Ismaili in the Zafaraniyeh neighbourhood of Tehran. This property was partially destroyed by the Imam Khomeini Relief Foundation on 19 July 2016 before being sold to a private owner and demolished completely.

== See also ==
- List of Iranian women royalty
