= Majd ed-Dowleh Qajar-Qovanlu Amirsoleimani =

Iranian prince and politician (1850–1937)

Prince Majd ed-Dowleh Amirsoleimani
- GCMG
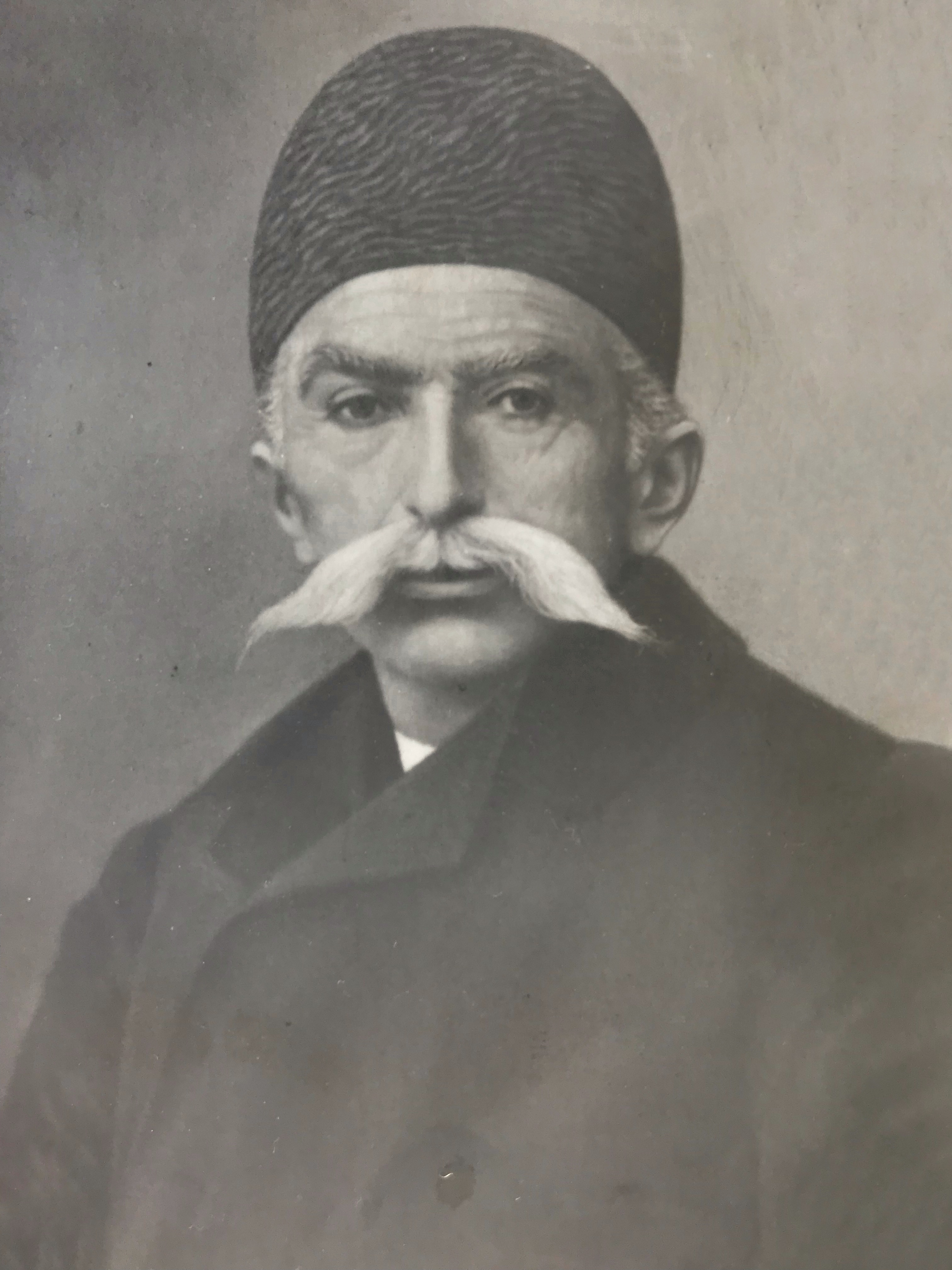
- Born: 18 November 1850; Tehran, Sublime State of Iran
- Died: 6 May 1937 (aged 86); Tehran, Imperial State of Iran
- Spouse: Touran Agha Khanoum
- House: Amirsoleimani
- Dynasty: Qajar
- Father: Prince Amir Issa Khan Vali Qajar Qovanlou, E'temad ed-Dowleh, Ehtesham ed-Dowleh

Prince Mehdi Qoli Khan-e Qajar-Qovanlou Amirsoleimani^{[1]} (Persian: مهدی قلی خان قاجار قوانلو امیرسلیمانی; also known as Majd ed-Dowleh; 18 November 1850 – 6 May 1937) was a prominent Qajar prince and one of the most influential noblemen of his time in Iran. He was a key court figure throughout the reigns of several Qajar Shahs, including Naser al-Din Shah, Mozaffar ad-Din Shah, Mohammad Ali Shah, and Ahmad Shah. He was particularly influential during the reign of Naser al-Din Shah, when he served as chief steward and trusted royal advisor, managing critical court affairs and playing a pivotal role in shaping the administration’s policies. Fluent in Persian, French and English, Majd ed-Dowleh was regarded as an intellectual figure, engaging with both Iranian and European political and cultural ideas.

Notably, he accompanied Naser al-Din Shah on his groundbreaking trips to Europe, which marked the first time an Iranian monarch had traveled to the West. These diplomatic journeys were significant in fostering cultural and political exchanges between Iran and Europe, and Majd ed-Dowleh played a key role in facilitating these interactions. His political acumen, intellectual contributions, and close association with the royal court made him a central figure in the later years of the Qajar dynasty.

== Biography ==
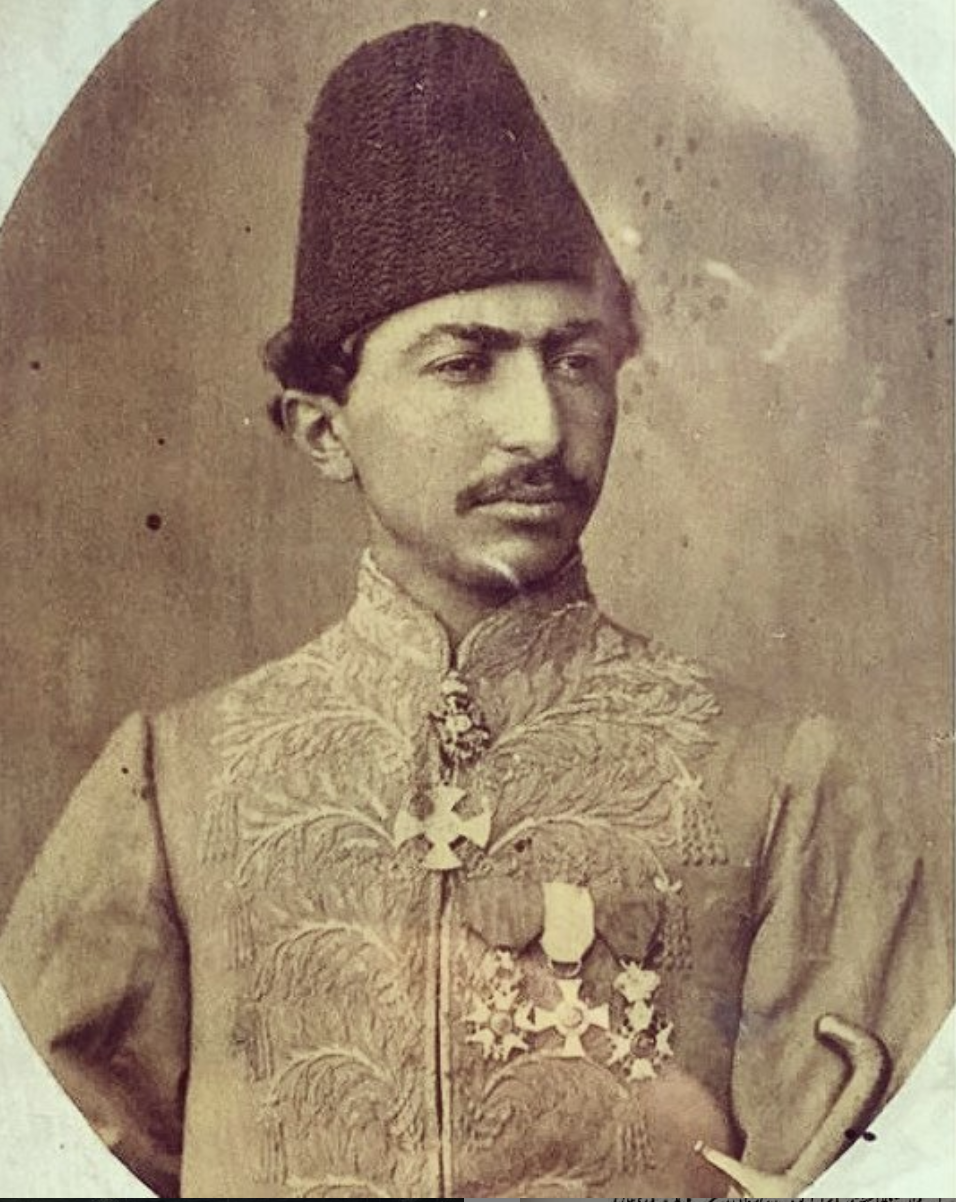
Portrait of Prince Majd ed-Dowleh Amirsoleimani, during Naser al-Din Shah's first trip to Europe, 1873

Prince Majd ed-Dowleh came from one of the most important aristocratic families in Tehran, the Amirsoleimani or Qajar Amirsoleimani family, which was well-known for its influence as high-ranking nobles, bureaucrats, and landowners. He was born into the Qovanlou branch of the Qajar tribe, a powerful clan with a complex history, often in rivalry with the Develu branch. His father, Prince Amir Issa Khan Vali, Etemad ed-Dowleh Qovanlou, descended from distinguished Qajar ancestors, including Mohammad Qasem Khan-e Zahir ed-Dowleh and Amir Soleiman Khan-e Etezad ed-Dowleh. Majd ed-Dowleh was the maternal cousin of Naser al-Din Shah, and steward and one of the grandees of the second half of Qajar period, positioning him close to the center of royal power.

Majd ed-Dowleh’s education was extensive and progressive for the time. Privately tutored at home, he studied a broad range of subjects, mastering Persian poetry and literature as well as history, geography, and modern sciences. Unlike many contemporaries, he valued a blend of classical Persian education and modern Western knowledge, achieving fluency in French and English and becoming familiar with European intellectual trends. This rigorous education solidified his reputation as an intellectual and a skilled diplomat, adept at navigating both Persian and Western cultures.

== Family ==
Majd ed-Dowleh's family maintained deep ties to the Qajar dynasty, being closely related to 6 the Qajar shahs, and ancestors intermarrying with Zand princesses. Majd ed-Dowleh's paternal grandmother was Begom Jan Khanom, his aunt, Malek Jahan Khanom (Mahd-e Olia), was the Regent of Iran as the wife of Mohammad Shah Qajar, and he was notably Naser al-Din Shah's favourite cousin. Majd ed-Dowleh married two daughters of Naser al-Din Shah: Princess Touran Agha Khanoum Qajar (Fakhr od-Dowleh) in 1883, the Shah's favored daughter, and Princess Walieh. Over the course of several marriages, he fathered 15 children.

Unlike other members of the royal household of his time, Majd ed-Dowleh valued both classical Persian education and modern Western learning, encouraging proficiency in foreign languages and diverse academic pursuits. He was a progressive parent, committed to providing equal educational opportunities for both his sons and daughters. His daughters were among the first women in elite circles to appear publicly in Western dress after Reza Shah Pahlavi’s ban on the veil in 1936. He also ensured that some of his children and grandchildren studied abroad, building international connections and furthering their education. Majd ed-Dowleh resided in a private compound within Golestan Palace, where every Friday he gathered with his grandchildren, sharing stories and offering guidance.

Reza Shah, who did not come from an aristocratic family, sought to marry into noble lineage by proposing to Majd ed-Dowleh's granddaughter, Turan Amirsoleimani. This union aimed to enhance Reza Shah’s social standing by tying his family to Persia's aristocratic roots. Turan Amirsoleimani and Reza Shah had one son together, Prince Gholam Reza Pahlavi, the half-brother of Mohammad Reza Pahlavi, the last Shah of Iran.

Majd ed-Dowleh died in 1937 and is the ancestor of the Amirsoleimani family. His legacy continues through his grandchildren, who are spread across the world, including contemporary cinema actors Saeed Amirsoleimani, Kamand Amirsoleimani, and Sepand Amirsoleimani. His descendants include the Amirsoleimani, Rahnamoon-Amirsoleimani, and Abrate-Amirsoleimani families.

== Political influence ==
Majd ed-Dowleh played a pivotal role in the political landscape of Iran during the reign of Naser al-Din Shah. Serving as the Shah’s high-steward, he helped navigate a delicate balance in both domestic and foreign policies. Domestically, Iran was managing complex relations with religious, administrative, and commercial authorities, while internationally, the Qajar dynasty faced the growing influence of foreign powers, particularly by the Russian Empire.

Majd ed-Dowleh was a strong advocate for increased contact with Europe, believing that diplomatic, military, technical, and educational exchanges with European powers could help modernize Iran and strengthen its position against foreign intervention. His fluency in French and English made him an invaluable asset during diplomatic missions, including the Shah’s groundbreaking travels to Europe. His role as a key figure in the court enabled him to contribute significantly to Iran's strategic interactions with the West during this period of shifting global dynamics.

Majd ed-Dowleh held various important positions within the Qajar administration, though he was not a political figure. He was a trusted individual at court, and as such, the Shah entrusted him with these responsibilities. From 1885, he served as Court Chamberlain, Master of the Horse, and Controller of the Royal Household, overseeing court affairs and the royal stables. He was appointed Governor of Khawech (1897–1901) and Kermanshah (1901–1903), managing these key regions. In 1903, he became a member of the Grand Council and Ilkhani of the Royal Clan, advising the monarchy and leading the Qajar tribal affairs. Additionally, he served as Governor of Shimran in 1905 and Commander of Artillery from 1907 to 1909, contributing to both administrative and military responsibilities. He was awarded the Decoration of the Imperial Portrait for his service.

== Travels to Europe ==
=== The Historic Journey ===
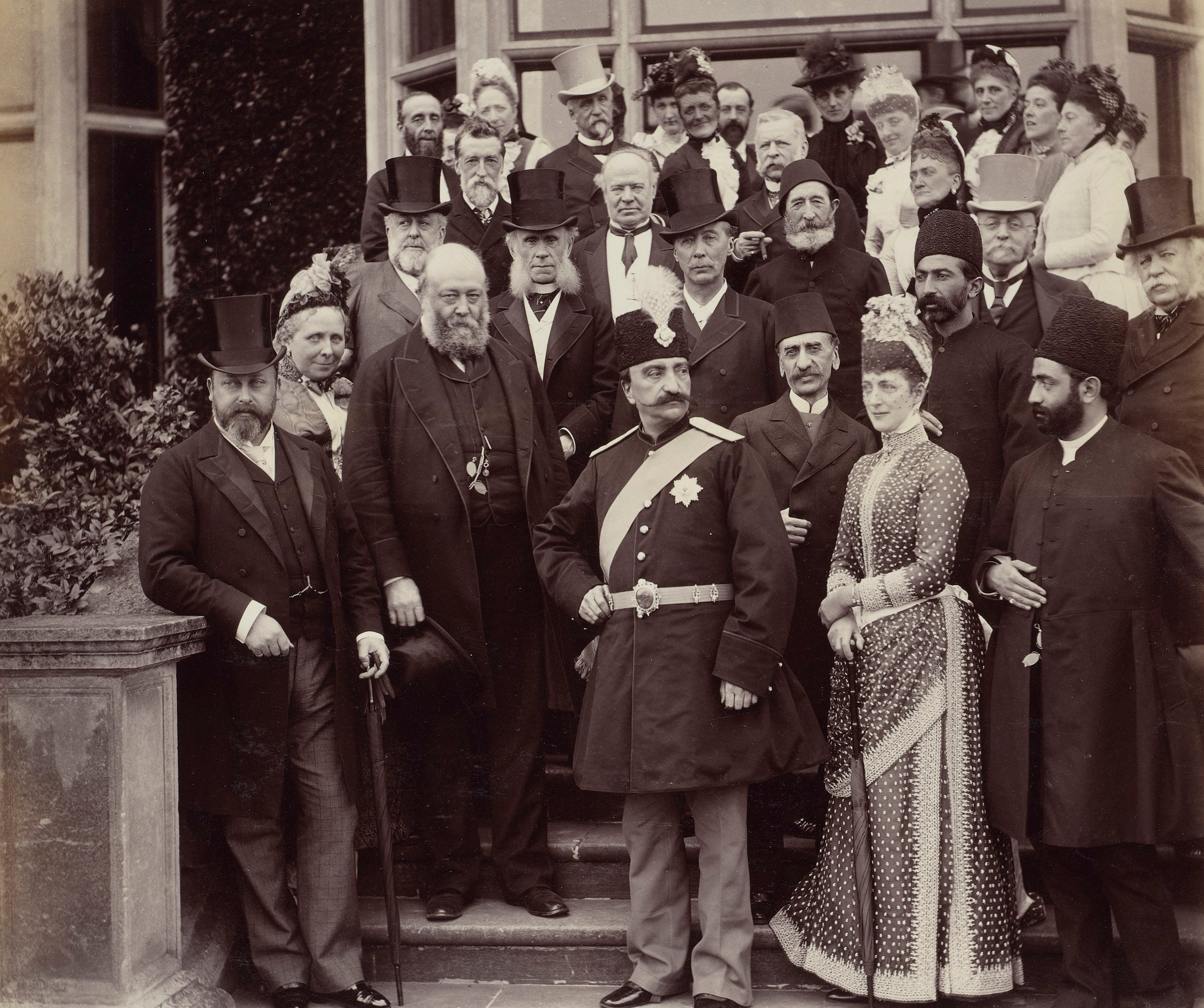
Garden party taken for Naser al-Din Shah's last visit to England, with Prince Majd ed-Dowleh Amirsoleimani, at Hatfield House, July 1889.

Majd ed-Dowleh accompanied Naser al-Din Shah on his historic trips to Europe, marking the first time an Iranian monarch had embarked on such a journey. He joined the Shah on all three of his European tours, the first in 1873, the second in 1878, and the last in 1889. In his 1873 travel diary, Naser al-Din Shah Qajar recounts his departure from Tehran and describes his route through Russia, Prussia, Germany, Belgium, England, France, Switzerland, Italy, Austria, Turkey, and Georgia. These journeys provided the Qajar court with valuable insights into European society, governance, and culture.

These diplomatic missions were crucial not only for strengthening Iran's international relationships but also for exposing the Qajar court to European advancements in governance, technology, and culture. Most of the travel was done by train or boat, reflecting the transportation options of the time.

As detailed in Taken for Wonder by Naghmeh Sohrabi, or in the Diary of H. M. the Shah of Persia by Naser al-Din Shab, these travels sparked a profound exchange of ideas, challenging both Iranian and European preconceptions. Iranian travelers, including Majd ed-Dowleh, observed European society with a mixture of admiration and critical reflection, particularly regarding issues like social organization and technological innovation. Their reports, which offered both fascination and critique, played a significant role in shaping Iran’s discussions on modernization and reform. This dynamic exchange between Iran and Europe during the late 19th century illustrates the reciprocal nature of cultural influence during a transformative era for both regions.

=== The Heroic Acts ===
In 1878, during a visit to Paris, Majd ed-Dowleh witnessed a French athlete who climbed the Eiffel Tower without the use of ropes or safety equipment. Inspired by this feat, Majd ed-Dowleh decided to attempt the climb himself. Without prior preparation, he stripped down to his clothing and successfully scaled the tower, even surpassing the Frenchman's record. This event contributed to his reputation for physical daring and courage.

His adventurous spirit was further displayed during a royal outing in England in 1889. While accompanying Naser al-Din Shah Qajar and Queen Victoria on a carriage ride through the royal estates and Hyde Park, the horses pulling the carriage became startled and bolted, causing the coachman to leap off in an attempt to save himself. In response, Majd ed-Dowleh quickly took action, jumping from horse to horse to regain control of the reins and prevent a potential disaster. In recognition of his bravery in saving the Queen's life, the British court awarded him the Knight Order of St Michael and St George, which also provided him with a lifelong pension and protection under the British government.

== Hunting ==
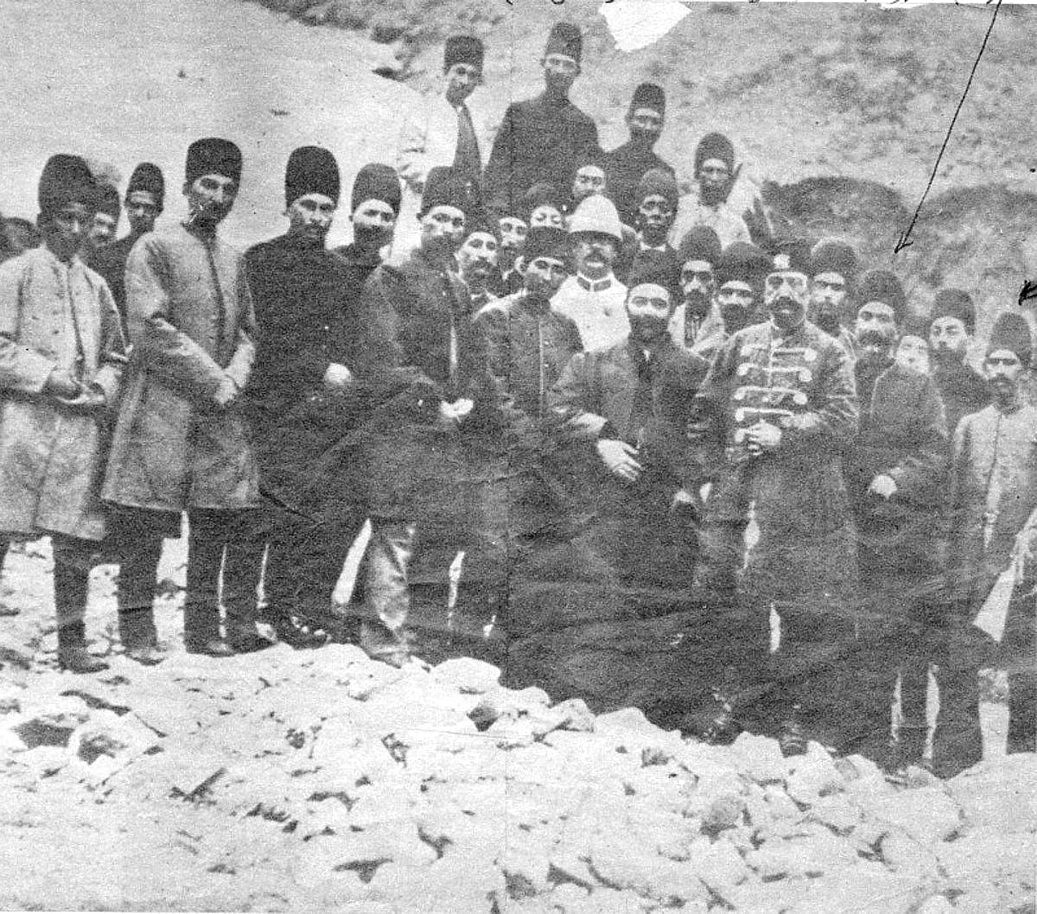
Naser al-Din Shah's hunt

Majd ed-Dowleh was renowned as one of the most prominent hunters in Iran and was reputed to be among the best hunters in the country. He was known to possess the largest private collection of guns in the country, an impressive array that he curated over years, including rare pieces acquired during his diplomatic trips to Europe. His collection was a reflection of his passion for hunting and fine weaponry.

One anecdote illustrates both his exceptional hunting skills and his courage, as described by his grandchild, Prince Gholam Reza Pahlavi, in his memoir Mon père, mon frère, les Shahs d'Iran. In the late 19th century, he was tracking a panther with his cousin, Naser al-Din Shah, at a royal hunting party. While all the hunters were on high alert and mindful of the protocol that ensured the Shah had the privilege of taking the first shot, the royal shot only wounded the panther. In its enraged state, the animal charged directly at the Shah. Firearms of the time were powder-loaded and required time to reload, leaving the Shah vulnerable. In a remarkable display of courage, Majd ed-Dowleh, acting swiftly, threw himself at the panther, grabbing its tail with his immense strength and pulling it away from the Shah. His heroic actions saved the life of the monarch, and from that moment on, their friendship became unshakable.

When Reza Shah rose to power, he confiscated this prized collection along with substantial portions of Majd ed-Dowleh's vast estates in Tehran. The seizure of his lands and firearms marked a significant loss, stripping Majd ed-Dowleh of both his assets and some of the symbols of his influence and legacy.

== Title and honors ==
His full name at birth was Shahzadeh Mehdi Qoli Khan Qajar-Qovanlou. When Reza Shah ascended to the throne, he mandated that all families adopt formal last names to symbolize a modernized Iran. Many Qajar nobles chose names reflecting their lineage, as the last name "Qajar" was no longer possible to use. Majd ed-Dowleh adopted "Amirsoleimani" as his surname, honoring his ancestral heritage. The suffix “-ed-Dowleh,” which literally translates to "of the government," traditionally signified a title granted by the Shah, referring to one who serves or is distinguished by the ruler. In broader usage, “ed-Dowleh” also conveys “of the Empire or State.”

During his visit to the United Kingdom in 1889 with Naser al-Din Shah, Majd ed-Dowleh was appointed by Queen Victoria a Knight Order of St Michael and St George, the highest English order of chivalry. He was appointed as a knight bachelor on 11 October 1889, following an honor conferred upon him by Queen Victoria at Osborne House on 29 July 1889. In The Knights of England by William Arthur Shaw, his name is spelled as Mehdi Quli Khan and he is referred to by the title Majd-ud-Dowleh.

== Children ==
Majd ed-Dowleh was married to eighteen wives throughout his life. Among them were two daughters of Naser al-Din Shah: Princess Touran Agha Khanoum Qajar (Fakhr od-Dowleh), the Shah's favored daughter, and Princess Walieh. Fakhr od-Dowleh, noted for her grace, education, and artistic talents, died in 1893 at the age of 32, after battling tuberculosis. Following her death, Majd ed-Dowleh married Princess Walieh, but she too succumbed to the same illness. Majd ed-Dowleh's marriages included many Qajar princesses, including Masoumeh Khanom, the daughter of Kamran Mirza Nayeb es-Saltaneh, a prominent noble of the Qajar court.

sons

- Prince Shams od-Din Khan, Tamjid ed-Dowleh Qajar Qovanlou Amirsoleimani
- Prince Isa Khan Majd es-Saltaneh Qajar Qovanlou Amirsoleimani
- Prince Mohammad Ali Khan Qajar Qovanlou Amirsoleimani
- Prince Abdol Hossein Khan Qajar Qovanlou Amirsoleimani
- Prince Allah Qoli Khan Qajar Qovanlou Amirsoleimani
- Prince Gholam Hossein Khan Qajar Qovanlou Amirsoleimani
- Prince Mostafa Qoli Khan Qajar Qovanlou Amirsoleimani
- Prince Morteza Qoli Khan Qajar Qovanlou Amirsoleimani

daughters

- Princess Eftekhar ed-Dowleh Khanom Qajar Qovanlou Amirsoleimani
- Princess Sorour Aghdas Khanom Qajar Qovanlou Amirsoleimani
- Princess Nezhat ed-Dowleh Khanom Qajar Qovanlou Amirsoleimani
- Princess Qodrat ed-Dowleh Khanom Qajar Qovanlou Amirsoleimani
- Princess Afagh ed-Dowleh Khanom Qajar Qovanlou Amirsoleimani
- Princess Monir-Azam Khanom Qajar Qovanlou Amirsoleimani
- Princess Ezzat ed-Dowleh Khanom Qajar Qovanlou Amirsoleimani

== Additional sources ==
- Daughter of Persia, Sattareh Farman Farmaian with Dona Munker; Crown Publishers, Inc., New York, 1992.
- Mon pere, mon frere, les Shahs d'Iran: Entretiens avec Son Altesse Imperiale le prince Gholam-Reza : Written by Gholam Reza Pahlavi, 2004 Edition, Publisher: Editions Normant.
