= Malek Jahan Khanom =

Iranian royal consort (1805–1873)

- Mahd-e Olia
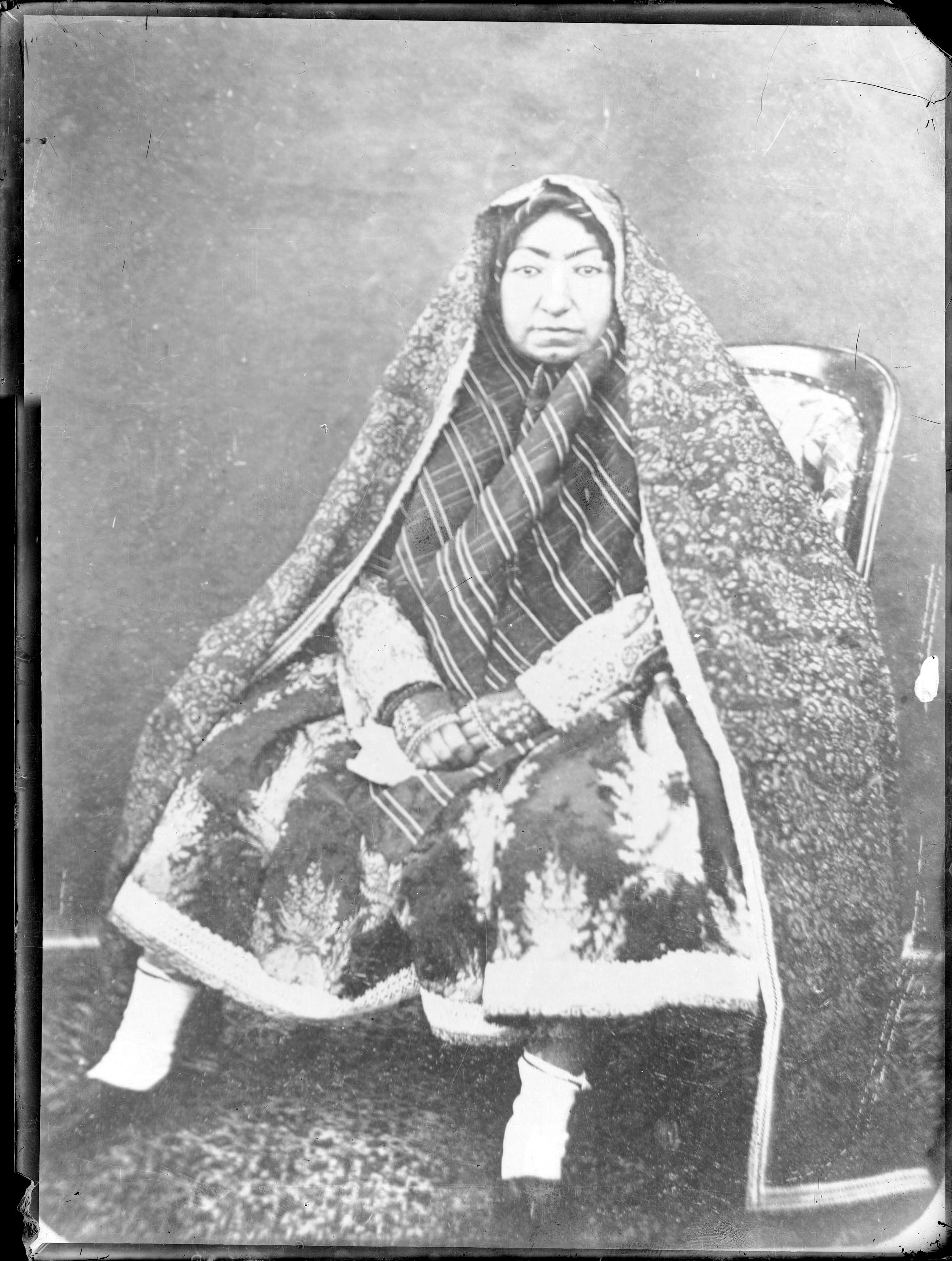
- Portrait by Antoin Sevruguin

Queen mother of the Qajar Iran
- Tenure: 5 September 1848 – 2 April 1873
- Predecessor: Galin Khanum
- Successor: Taj ol-Molouk

De facto Regent of Qajar Iran
- Regency: 5 September 1848 – 5 October 1848

Queen consort of the Qajar Iran
- Tenure: 23 October 1834 – 5 September 1848
- Born: Malek Jahan Khanom Qajar Qovanlou Amirsoleimani; 26 February 1805; Tehran, Sublime State of Iran
- Died: 2 April 1873 (aged 68); Tehran, Sublime State of Iran
- Burial: Fatima Masuma Shrine
- Spouse: Mohammad Shah Qajar
- Issue: Soltan Malek Mirza; Soltan Mahmoud Mirza; Naseraddin Shah; Keshvar Khanom; Maleknesa Khanom
Names
- Malek Jahan Khanom, Mahd-e Olia
- House: Amirsoleimani
- Dynasty: Qajar
- Father: Amir Mohammad Qasem Khan Qajar Qovanlou Amirsoleimani
- Mother: Princess Begom Jan Khanom Qajar
- Religion: Shia Islam

Malek Jahan Khanom (Persian: ملک‌جهان خانم; 26 February 1805 – 2 April 1873) was one of the wives of Mohammad Shah Qajar and the mother of Naser al-Din Shah Qajar. She was the de facto regent of Iran for one month, from 5 September until 5 October in 1848, between the death of her husband and the accession of her son. She is regarded as one of the important court figures of the Qajar era. She was the most powerful and influential woman of the Qajar dynasty.

During the reign of Naser al-Din Shah, the supervision of all the women of the Qajar harem was under Mahd-e Olya, and she carried out most of the harem's important affairs. Correspondence with foreign empresses and the wives of ambassadors, as well as hosting female foreign guests who visited the harem, was Malek Jahan Khanom's responsibility. She also played an important role in the appointment of governors and ministers. After her death, the supervision of the royal harem was entrusted to Anis al-Dowleh, a wife of Naser al-Din Shah.

Moʿayyer al-Mamalek writes:

Mahd-e Olya had an immense and splendid household. My grandmother, Taj al-Dowleh, the first formal wife of Naser al-Din Shah after his accession, used to tell me that four high-ranking eunuchs and twenty personal attendants were always with Mahd-e Olya; dressed in exquisite and elegant garments, so honored and respected that the women of the inner court were jealous of them and flattered them to gain their attention. In her pantry and dining hall, there were so many jeweled hookahs, tea and coffee cups, trays, sherbet bowls, spoons, and gold and silver utensils that even in the shops of the most reputable goldsmiths, such a collection could not be found. Mahd-e Olya's table was always colorful and abundant; every day and night, sixty to seventy sons and daughters of Fath-Ali Shah and other prominent women of the court would sit at her table. The Shah's mother's special washbasin and basin were made of jewel-encrusted gold, and the other washbasins were made of enameled silver. She had a private bath, whose dressing rooms, treasuries, walls, and floors were decorated with the finest marble, and all the bath utensils were made of turquoise-inlaid silver. Twice a week, she would go to the bath in the mornings. Each time, the maidservants stood in two lines from her room to the bath, holding up a long curtain—woven from lengths of shawl—so that no one could see the Shah's mother in her nightgown.

One European traveler wrote about Mahd-e Olya's influence and power: "The Queen Mother, known at court as Valedeh, possesses such authority and prestige that she plays a decisive role, particularly in appointing governors, selecting ministers, and even in the Shah's marriages. Her affairs are always the main subject of rumors and conversations among the townspeople".

== Early life ==
Malek Jahan Khanom was an Iranian princess of the Qajar dynasty by both birth and marriage. By birth, being the daughter of Amir Mohammad Qasem Khan Qajar Qovanlou Amirsoleimani 'Amir Kabir' and Princess Begom Jan Khanom Qajar, she was the granddaughter of Fath Ali Shah Qajar. Her paternal grandfather was the powerful Qajar commander Amir Suleiman Khan Qajar Qovanlou 'Amir Kabir' 'Nezam Odala' 'Etezad Odala' and her paternal grandmother was a princess of the Zand dynasty. She was the aunt of Prince Majd ed-Dowleh Qajar-Qovanlu Amirsoleimani and great-aunt of Malake Turan Amirsuleimani.

== Marriage and the Harem ==
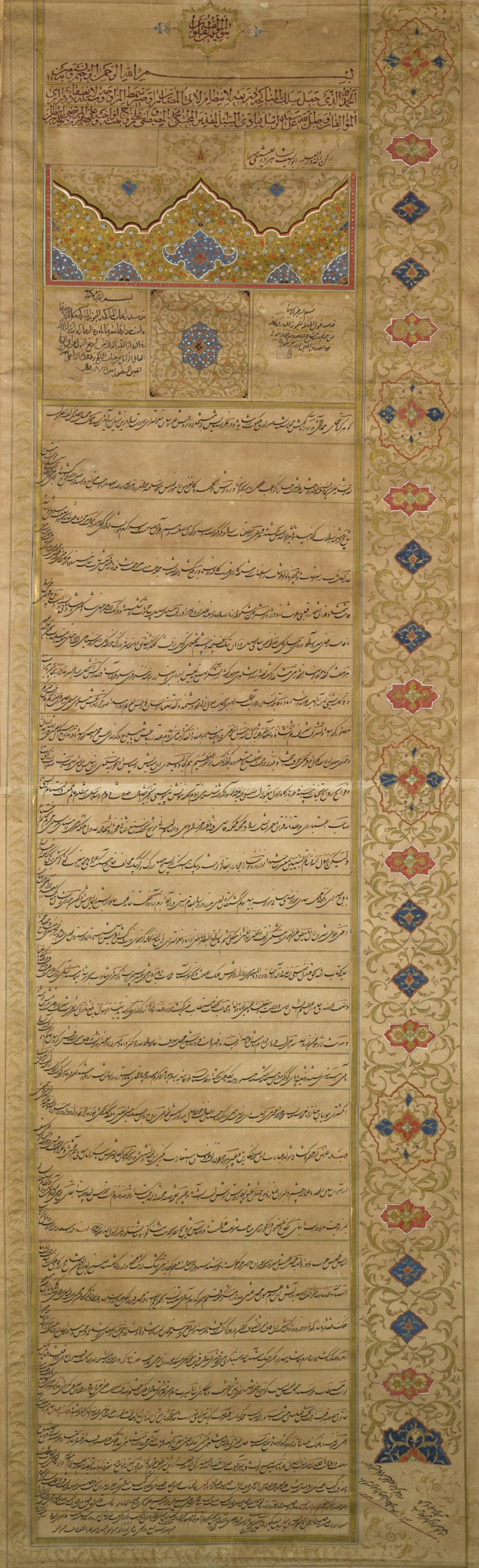
An illuminated marriage contract of Malek Jahan Khanum, grand-daughter of Fath Ali Shah to Mirza Muhammad Hassan, Persia, Qajar, dated 1833–34

She was married at a young age to her cousin, Mohammad Shah (reign 1834–1848). Her husband married about fifteen women during his lifetime, but she was one of his earliest wives. She held prestige within the harem for several reasons: because of her seniority among the Shah's wives; because she was a member of the family by birth and therefore well-networked and well-versed in their ways; because she bore her husband as many as five children (two of whom reached adulthood) and most of all because she was the mother of the crown prince.

Her only surviving son, Naseraddin, would succeed his father to the Iranian throne. Her title, Mahd Olia, Mehd-i-aulia or Mehd-e-olia means "Sublime Cradle" and this title was generally bestowed on the mother of the heir apparent.

Her relationship with Mohammad Shah and her prestige within the harem got significantly challenged by Muhammad Shah's favorite and mistress, Khadija Chahriqi. She feared that Khadija and Muhammad Shah might be heading to make Khadija's son, Abbas Mirza, who was 8 years younger than Naser, the heir; also because Muhammad Shah showed Abbas great care and attention as well as he did to his mother. But Malek Jahan managed to hold her son's prestige and authority as the Crown prince until Mohammad Shah's death as he was spending some years in his teens in Tabriz to learn the way of ruling.

== Political life ==
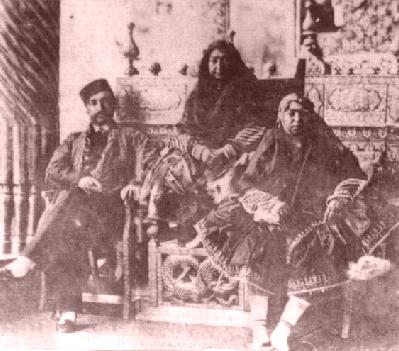
Malek Jahan Khanom sitting on the steps of the Sun Throne (middle), Naser ad-Din Shah (her son, the fourth Shah of the Qajar dynasty, left), and Princess Malek Zade (her daughter, right)

Malek Jahan Khanom, known as Mahd-e Olya, was the most powerful and influential woman in the entire history of the Qajar dynasty, and also one of its most authoritative women. During her husband's reign, she held considerable power and authority, exercising direct influence over state affairs. She was involved in the appointment and dismissal of government officials and wielded significant influence in the administration of the country. Mohammad Shah heeded her recommendations and acted upon her wishes. Malek Jahan Khanom was highly influential in subsequent developments.

After Mohammad Shah's death, Mahd-e Olya immediately sent a swift courier to Tabriz to inform her sixteen-year-old son, Naser al-Din Mirza, the crown prince, of his father's passing. She herself took control in Tehran, overseeing the administration of the country and managing the affairs of the government. It is said that Mahd-e Olya always wore two scarves: one black and the other colorful. She herself explained, “I wear the black for mourning my husband, Mohammad Shah, and the other for the joy of my son, Naser al-Din Mirza, ascending the throne.” These two scarves symbolized the duality of grief and power in her life.

After Haji Mirza Aqasi stepped down as prime minister and sought refuge at Hazrat Abdol Azim—a move ordered by Mahd-e Olya—a group of Qajar nobles and princes gathered to form a consultative council. Occasionally, political representatives of the two major powers of the time, Colonel Justin Sheil from Britain and Prince Dolgorukov from Russia, also attended these meetings. The council discussed matters of state, crises, and methods of governance, and their final decisions were presented to Mahd-e Olya for approval, with her issuing the orders for their execution. In fact, until Naser al-Din Shah could travel from Tabriz to Tehran—a journey that lasted one hundred days—Mahd-e Olya effectively served as the regent of Iran: a woman who, in the absence of the Shah, held the reins of power with authority and intelligence, managing the transition of power herself. Mahd-e Olya possessed several personal seals, each engraved with her name and title, which she used to stamp her orders and decrees. One of these seals bore the following inscription:

“The Sovereign Mother of Naser al-Din Shah”

“The Mother of the Jewel-Crowned Shah”

The Shah's caravan entered Tehran on 18 Dhu al-Qi‘dah, 1264 AH; at that time, the capital was in a state of chaos and instability. Mahd-e Olya, fearing the claimants to the throne—especially the supporters of Abbas Mirza Malek Ara, another son of Mohammad Shah who, along with his mother Khadijeh Sultan, was favored by the Shah—sought refuge in the British and Russian embassies. After securing the support of these two powers, she was able to take control of affairs with authority. Tehran and other provinces were in complete disorder at the time. Haji Mirza Aghasi, Mohammad Shah's weak and unpopular minister, who had alienated many nobles and courtiers during his tenure and had no support beyond the Shah himself, had sought refuge in the Abbasabad fortress in the final days of Mohammad Shah's reign, fearing for his life. He tried to secure Abbas Mirza Malek Ara as the Shah's successor in order to preserve his own power. Mirza Aghasi even wrote several letters to Reza Qoli Khan Hedayat-Allah Bashi, Abbas Mirza's official, requesting that Malek Ara be brought to Abbasabad so that, by having him declared regent, he could maintain control over state affairs. However, Reza Qoli Khan, fearing Mahd-e Olya and facing strong opposition from the court nobles, refused to carry out this plan.

During the reign of Naser al-Din Shah, she exercised full control over appointments and dismissals and wielded considerable influence in the administration of state affairs.

After Mohammad Shah's death in Shawwal 1246 AH, chaos in Iran intensified and the capital fell into even greater disorder. In this turbulent environment, the young and inexperienced Naser al-Din Mirza, aged nineteen, ascended the throne, while Mirza Taqi Khan Amir Nezam—who would later become famous as Amir Kabir—assumed the office of prime minister.

However, from the very beginning, Mahd-e Olya, the Shah's mother, did not get along with him and gradually expanded the scope of her intrigues and provocations. Although Naser al-Din Shah initially resisted the pressures from his mother and Amir Kabir's adversaries, he ultimately yielded to their repeated conspiracies. Amir Kabir was dismissed from his post and, shortly thereafter, was executed by the Shah's order, under the insistence of Mahd-e Olya. With his removal, the field was opened even wider for opportunistic families and foreign influence.

During Mohammad Shah's illness, Mirza Aqa Khan Nuri—who would later become known as the most infamous prime minister of this era—had secretly established connections with Mahd-e Olya and, through this channel, gained access to the British embassy. Haji Mirza Aqasi, the prime minister at the time, aware of this relationship, chose to remain silent to avoid scandal and instructed his associates not to reveal anything they had seen or heard. Aqa Khan transmitted reports, which Mirza then communicated to the British embassy. At the same time, Mirza Aqa Khan Nouri would first suggest whatever he wished to convey to the Shah through Mahd-e Olya, who would then relay the same messages and viewpoints to the Shah. During Naser al-Din Shah's reign, this unusual relationship between Mirza Aqa Khan and Mahd-e Olya led the Shah to assign Prince Mohammad Vali Mirza, a son of Fath-Ali Shah, to reside in Mahd-e Olya's quarters in order to control access, instructing that no one was allowed to meet with the prime minister without her permission. Following this arrangement, Mirza Aqa Khan was exiled.

After Mohammad Shah's death, one of the first actions taken to prepare for Naser al-Din Shah's accession was the dismissal of Haji Mirza Aghasi from the office of prime minister, the confirmation of the governors' decrees over the provinces, and the order to maintain their administration, as well as the suppression of the revolt led by Saif al-Muluk Mirza Qajar. However, Haji Mirza Aghasi refused to accept Mahd-e Olya's order regarding his dismissal, and some princes sided with him. Meanwhile, the Russian and British ministers had sent messages to the princes, stating that the Shah of Iran must ascend the throne and that whatever he decreed would be binding. Until that time, they still considered Haji Mirza Aghasi as prime minister."Despite all the compassion and grace that the victorious Shah has granted you, during his illness and weakness you did not even attend him; now what use is there in showing courage and competence? We ourselves are capable of guarding the house and treasury of the throne and crown, and will not depend on your misguided judgment."

At the same time, the Russian and British ministers personally met with her and spoke at length about Haji Mirza Aghasi. However, the responses they received from Mahd-e Olya, delivered with such wisdom and fairness, left them astonished. They remarked, "In the fourteen years we have been in Iran, we have never heard such steadfast and well-considered words from any man." Following this discussion, they ceased their interference in Haji Mirza Aghasi's affairs, leaving him suddenly powerless. Meanwhile, the court officials deemed it prudent for Mahd-e Olya to issue orders to all cities, instructing that governors and administrators should continue their duties and refrain from altering any previously issued decrees until the Shah, the rightful heir to the throne, arrived in the capital. After the death of the victorious Shah, tribes residing around the capital rose in rebellion, blocking roads and turning thoroughfares into ambushes. Acting on the advice of Prince Ali Qoli Mirza, Mahd-e Olya commanded that Suleiman Khan Afshar, along with a detachment of the Jazar army, leave the capital and punish these ungrateful rebels. Suleiman Khan, with four hundred Afshar cavalry, advanced as far as Qazvin, clearing the bandits from the roads and securing safe passage for caravans.

== Characteristics ==
Moʿayyer al-Mamalek writes about Mahd-e Olya:

She did not possess striking physical beauty, but she was richly endowed with spiritual and intellectual gifts. She was an intelligent, educated, capable, and competent lady. She had a strong command of Persian literature and the rules of the Arabic language, and she wrote elegantly in both large and small script. She had a great interest in history and the divans of poets, and her private library was mostly composed of such works. Her speech was sweet, and she was quick-witted in conversation. She had memorized many proverbs, anecdotes, and poems, which she employed skillfully and appropriately during her discourse. This great lady was a highly skilled artist, proficient in embroidery and painting. Her embroidered works astonished both experts and fellow artists. She was an intelligent and capable woman who, in addition to her abundant talent and refined sensibilities, enjoyed high status and influence, and consistently honored scholars and learned men.

== Amir Kabir's ministry ==
As widow, she was the de facto regent of Iran for one month, from 5 September until 5 October 1848, between the death of her husband and the accession to the throne of her son when he arrived to the capital accompanied by Mirza Taghi Khan. Holding so much power in that time, she oppressed the rebellions across Iran when many statesmen felt unable to and dismissed her late husband's Grand vizier, Haji Mirza Aqasi. After his coronation, Naser immediately appointed Mirza Taghi as the grand vizier and gave him the title of Amir Kabir.

As queen mother, Malek Jahan who was often referred to as Mahd Olia, exerted considerable political influence during the reign of her son from 1848 until her death in 1873. She is described as a strong personality and politically gifted. Strongly rooted in family and clan networks, she tended to favour and support the Qajar nobility rather than merited commoners, partly also perhaps because members of the Qajar family and clan had much better access to her as compared to outsiders. These all started to add tension to her relationship with Amir Kabir.
