= Amirsoleimani family =

Iranian princely family

Amirsoleimani
- Noble family
- Amirsoleimani, cadet branch of the Qajar dynasty
- Parent house: Qajar dynasty
- Country: Iran
- Current region: Iran; Italy; United States; France
- Founded: 16th century
- Founder: Amir-Soleiman Khan Qajar Qovanlou
- Connected families: Pahlavi

The House of Amirsoleimani (Persian: امیرسلیمانی), also known as the Amirsoleimani-Qajar (Persian: امیرسلیمانی قاجار), is a distinguished Iranian princely family with roots in the Qajar dynasty that ruled Iran from 1789 to 1925. The family descends from Mussa Khan Qajar Qovanlou, and the family name stems from Amir Soleiman Khan Qajar Qovanlou, a prominent Qajar noble, whose descendants played significant roles within the royal court and administration during the Qajar period. Members of the Amirsoleimani family held various high-ranking positions, including key roles in the administration and court of Naser al-Din Shah, Mozaffar ad-Din Shah, Mohammad Ali Shah, and Ahmad Shah.

== History ==
The Amirsoleimani family, a distinguished branch of the Qajar aristocracy, holds a prominent place among Iran’s nobility. Originating from Amir Soleiman Khan Qovanlou, the family ascended to high ranks within the Qajar dynasty (1785–1925), with members often occupying influential roles in the royal court and government. As with other Qajar princely families, their standing was defined by factors such as lineage, marital ties, and proximity to the royal household. Members like Prince Mehdi Qoli Khan Amirsoleimani, known as Majd ed-Dowleh, served as key political figures and advisors, helping to shape Persian policy and culture during a transformative period in Iranian history.

With the rise of Reza Shah Pahlavi, the Qajar aristocracy underwent significant changes. Reza Shah decreed that all families should adopt surnames as part of his modernisation efforts, leading many Qajar nobility to choose last names linked to their family heritage. The Amirsoleimani family chose "Amirsoleimani" as a nod to their esteemed ancestor. Reza Shah's marriage to Turan Amirsoleimani, granddaughter of Majd ed-Dowleh, solidified the family's prominence under the Pahlavi dynasty as well, further linking them to the Iranian royal lineage. Turan Amirsoleimani and Reza Shah Pahlavi had one son, Prince Gholam Reza, thus integrating the Amirsoleimani bloodline into Iran's new ruling dynasty.

Following the 1979 Iranian revolution, many members of the Amirsoleimani family, like other Qajar descendants, joined the diaspora and maintained ties to their heritage. Today, they are part of a broader Iranian aristocracy scattered around the world, preserving the legacy of their family's role in Iran's royal and political history.

== Notable Members ==
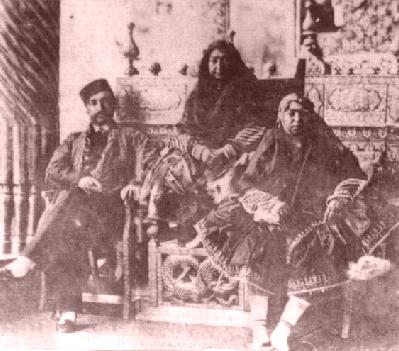
Malek Jahan Khanom (1805–1873)

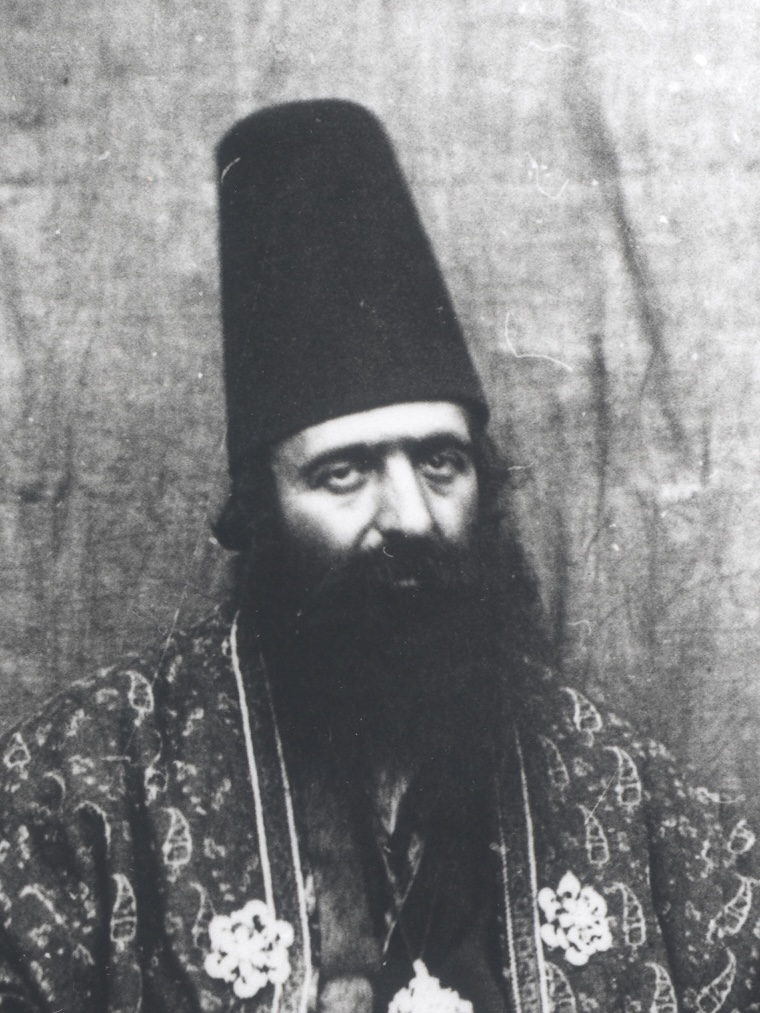
Amir-Aslan Khan Majd od-Dowleh (?-1909)

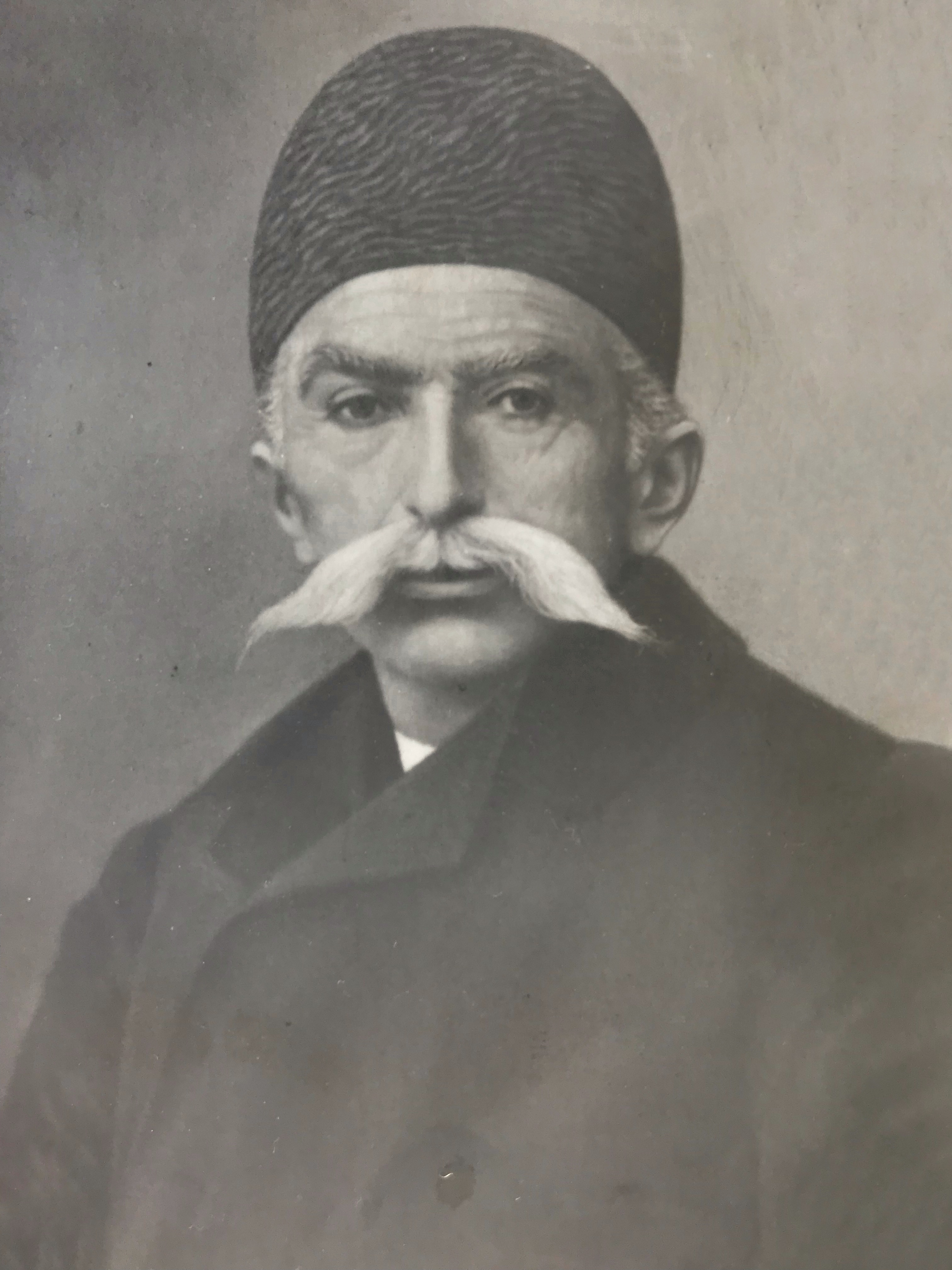
Prince Majd ed-Dowleh (1850–1937)

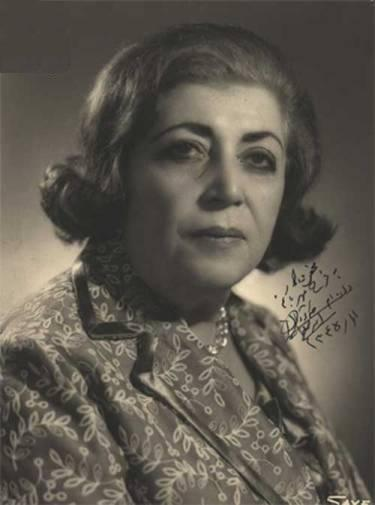
Malake Touran Amirsoleimani (1905–1994)

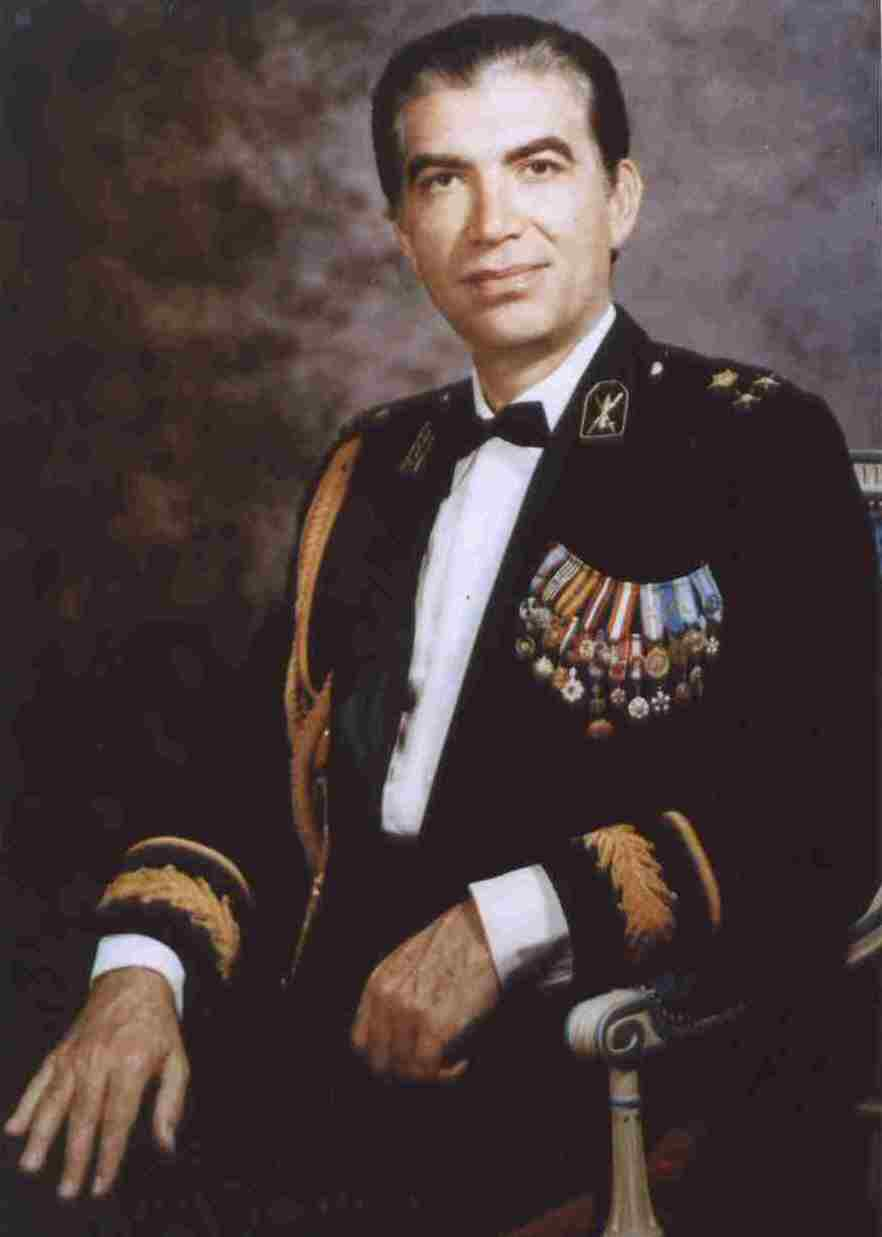
Prince Gholam Reza Pahlavi (1923–2017)
- Prince Majd ed-Dowleh Qajar-Qovanlu Amirsoleimani, one of Iran's most influential politicians of his time. He was a key court figure throughout the reigns of several Qajar Shahs, including Naser al-Din Shah, Mozaffar ad-Din Shah, Mohammad Ali Shah, and Ahmad Shah.
- Malek Jahan Khanom Amirsoleimani, regent of the Sublime State of Iran in 1848 before the accession to the throne of her son, Naser al-Din Shah.
- Prince Amir-Aslan Khan Majd od-Dowleh Amirsoleimani, brother of Malek Jahan Khanom, statesman, and maternal uncle of Naser al-Din Shah, who served as governor of Gilan and Zanjan.
- Princess Turan Amirsoleimani, she was the third wife of Reza Shah, with whom she had one son Gholam Reza Pahlavi
- Gholam Reza Pahlavi, half-brother of Mohammad Reza Pahlavi, the last Shah of Iran.
- Sepand Amirsoleimani, Iranian actor.
- Kamand Amirsoleimani, Iranian actress.
- Saeed Amirsoleimani, Iranian actor.
