= Ardashir Mirza =

Iranian prince (1805/06–1866)

- Rokn ed-Dowleh
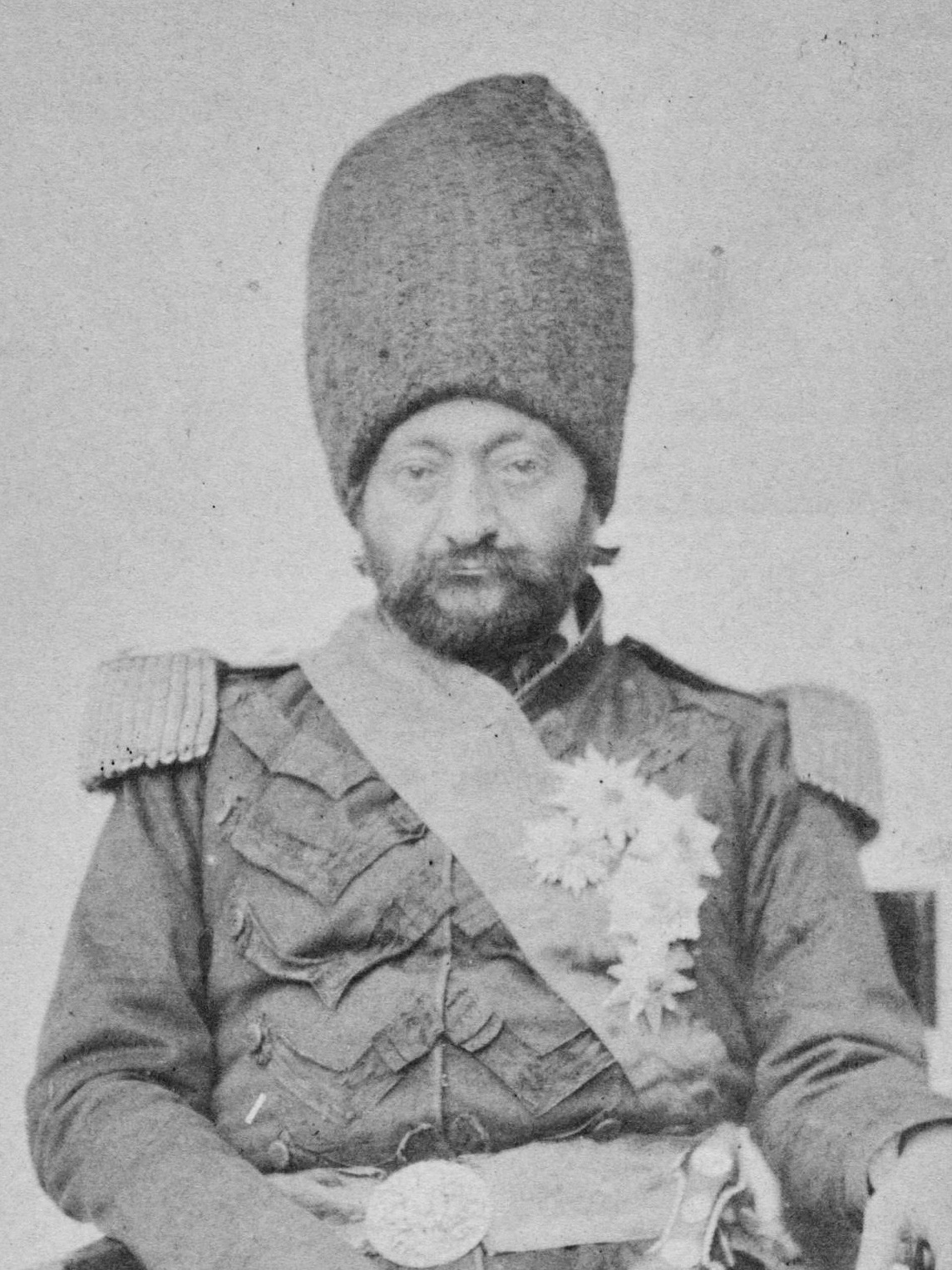
- Photograph of Ardashir Mirza. By Luigi Pesce in c. 1860
- Born: 1805/06; Tabriz, Sublime State of Iran
- Died: 1866 (aged 59–61); Tehran, Sublime State of Iran
- Dynasty: Qajar
- Father: Abbas Mirza
- Religion: Twelver Shia Islam
- Military career
- Conflicts: Revolt of Hasan Khan Salar; Second Herat War

Ardashir Mirza Rokn ed-Dowleh (Persian: اردشیر میرزا رکن الدوله; 1805/06 – 1866) was a Qajar prince who held the governorship of several Iranian provinces during the reigns of Fath-Ali Shah Qajar (r. 1797–1834), Mohammad Shah Qajar (r. 1834–1848) and Naser al-Din Shah Qajar (r. 1848–1896). He was the ninth son of Abbas Mirza.

== Sources ==
- Ardakani, H. Mahbubi (1986). "Ardašīr Mīrzā". In Yarshater, Ehsan (ed.). Encyclopædia Iranica. Vol. II/4: Architecture IV–Armenia and Iran IV. London and New York: Routledge & Kegan Paul. p. 383. ISBN 978-0-71009-104-8.
