= Hirotake Maeda =

Professor of History

Hirotake Maeda is Professor of History at the Faculty of Humanities and Social Sciences of Tokyo Metropolitan University. He specializes in Middle Eastern Studies, Eurasian Studies, and the histories of Iran and the Caucasus. He focuses in particular on the origins of the gholam (also spelled ghulam) military "slaves" of Safavid Iran and their role and position in Iran's history, using Persian and Georgian sources.

== Selected publications ==
- Maeda, Hirotake (2003). "On the Ethno-Social Background of Four Gholām Families from Georgia in Safavid Iran". Studia Iranica. 32 (2): 243–278. doi:10.2143/SI.32.2.563203.
- Maeda, Hirotake (2012). "Exploitation Of The Frontier: The Caucasus Policy Of Shah 'Abbas I". In Floor, Willem; Herzig, Edmund (eds.). Iran and the World in the Safavid Age. I.B.Tauris. ISBN 978-1850439301.
- Maeda, Hirotake (2019). "Lives of the Enikolopians: Multilingualism and the Religious-National Identity of a Caucasus Family in the Persianate World". In Amanat, Abbas; Ashraf, Assef (eds.). The Persianate World: Rethinking a Shared Sphere. Brill. pp. 169–195. ISBN 978-90-04-38562-7.
