= Qajar family tree =

Family tree

Fath Ali Khan (1685–1726)
Mohammad Hassan Khan (1722–1752)
1. Agha Mohammad Khan (1742–1797); Shah of Persia; 1794–1797	Hossein Qoli Khan (1749–1777)	Morteza Qoli Khan	Mostafa Qoli Khan	Reza Qoli Khan	Jafar Qoli Khan Qajar	Mahdi Qoli Khan	Abbas Qoli Khan Qajar	Ali Qoli Khan Qajar
2. Fath Ali Shah (1772–1834); Shah of Persia; 1797–1834	Hossein Qoli (1780–1808)
Abbas Mirza (1789–1833); Vali Ahad; 1797–1833
3. Mohammad Shah Qajar (1808–1848); Shah of Persia; 1834–1848
4. Nasser al-Din Shah (1831–1896); Shah of Persia; 1848–1896
5. Mozafar al-Din Shah (1853–1907); Shah of Persia; 1896–1907
6. Mohammad Ali Shah (1872–1925); Shah of Persia; 1907–1909
7. Soltan Ahmad Shah (1898–1930) shah of Persia; 1909–1925	Mohammad Hassan Mirza (1899–1943); Heir presumptive to the Qajar throne 1930–1943	Soltan Majid Mirza (1907–1986)	Soltan Mahmoud Mirza (1905–1988); Senior head of the Imperial household 1988
Irandokht Qajar (1915–1984); Heir presumptive to the Qajar throne 1930–1984	Soltan Hamid Mirza (1918–1988); Heir presumptive to the Qajar throne 1975–1988	Soltan Ali Mirza (1929–2011); Senior head of the Imperial household 1988–2011	Mohammad Ali Mirza Qajar (born 1942); Senior head of the Imperial household since 2011
Mohammed Hassan Mirza II (born 1949); Heir presumptive to the Qajar throne since 1988
Arsalan Mirza Qajar
