= Ali Mirza Qajar =

Qajar prince (1929–2011)

Prince Soltan Ali Mirza Qajar

Head of the Qajar dynasty
- Tenure: 2 July 1988 – 27 May 2011
- Predecessor: Soltan Mahmoud Mirza
- Successor: Mohammad Ali Mirza Qajar
- Born: سلطانعلی میرزا قاجار; 16 November 1929; Beirut, Lebanon
- Died: 27 May 2011 (aged 81); Paris, France
- Dynasty: Qajar
- Father: Prince Soltan Majid Mirza
- Mother: Homadokht Kian

Prince Soltan Ali Mirza Kadjar (Qajar) (Persian: سلطانعلی میرزا قاجار; 16 November 1929 – 27 May 2011) was an Iranian Prince of the Qajar dynasty and the son of Soltan Majid Mirza Qajar (1907–1975) and Homadokht Kian (Shayesteh Khanoum) (1912–1992) and the grandson of Mohammad Ali Shah Qajar. He was the Head of the Qajar imperial family. Despite Soltan Ali Mirza Qajar being head of the Qajar imperial family, the Qajar claimant to the Sun Throne was the Heir Presumptive Mohammad Hassan Mirza II, son of Soltan Hamid Mirza and grandson of Soltan Ahmad Shah's brother and successor in exile, Mohammad Hassan Mirza Qajar.

Kaanoun-e Khanevadegi-e Ghajar (after 1999 Kadjar Family Association also named Qajar Family Association: KFA/QFA) was founded in Tehran under the presidency of Nosrat-os-Saltaneh son of Mozaffar al-Din Shah and Yamin-ed-Dowleh son of Naser al-Din Shah. It was dissolved two years after its founding. In 1999 under the presidency of Prince Soltan Ali Mirza this reconstituted association was brought to life by Prof. Manoutchehr Eskandari-Qajar (Santa Barbara City College) and Leo Barjesteh, who, together with Prof. M. Tehranian (then University of Hawaii), also founded the International Qajar Studies Association, of which Soltan Ali Mirza Qajar was the honorary president.

Soltan Ali Mirza was a Barrister at Law from France and resided in Paris, France. He is the author of Les Rois oubliés.

Soltan Ali Mirza Qajar died on 27 May 2011, in Paris. Shortly before his death he donated his collection of Qajar manuscripts and photographs to the Qajar Studies and Documentation Centre, housed at the International Institute of Social History in Amsterdam, the Netherlands and partly exhibited at the International Museum for Family History in Eijsden, the Netherlands. He was succeeded by Mohammad Ali Mirza Qajar, son of Sultan Mahmoud Mirza Qajar.

Ali Mirza Qajar Qajar dynasty Born: 16 November 1929 Died: 27 May 2011
Regnal titles
Preceded by Mahmoud Mirza	Head of the Imperial House of Qajar; 1988–2011	Succeeded by Mohammad Ali Mirza Qajar
