= Badr al-Molouk =

Iranian royal consort (1897–1979)

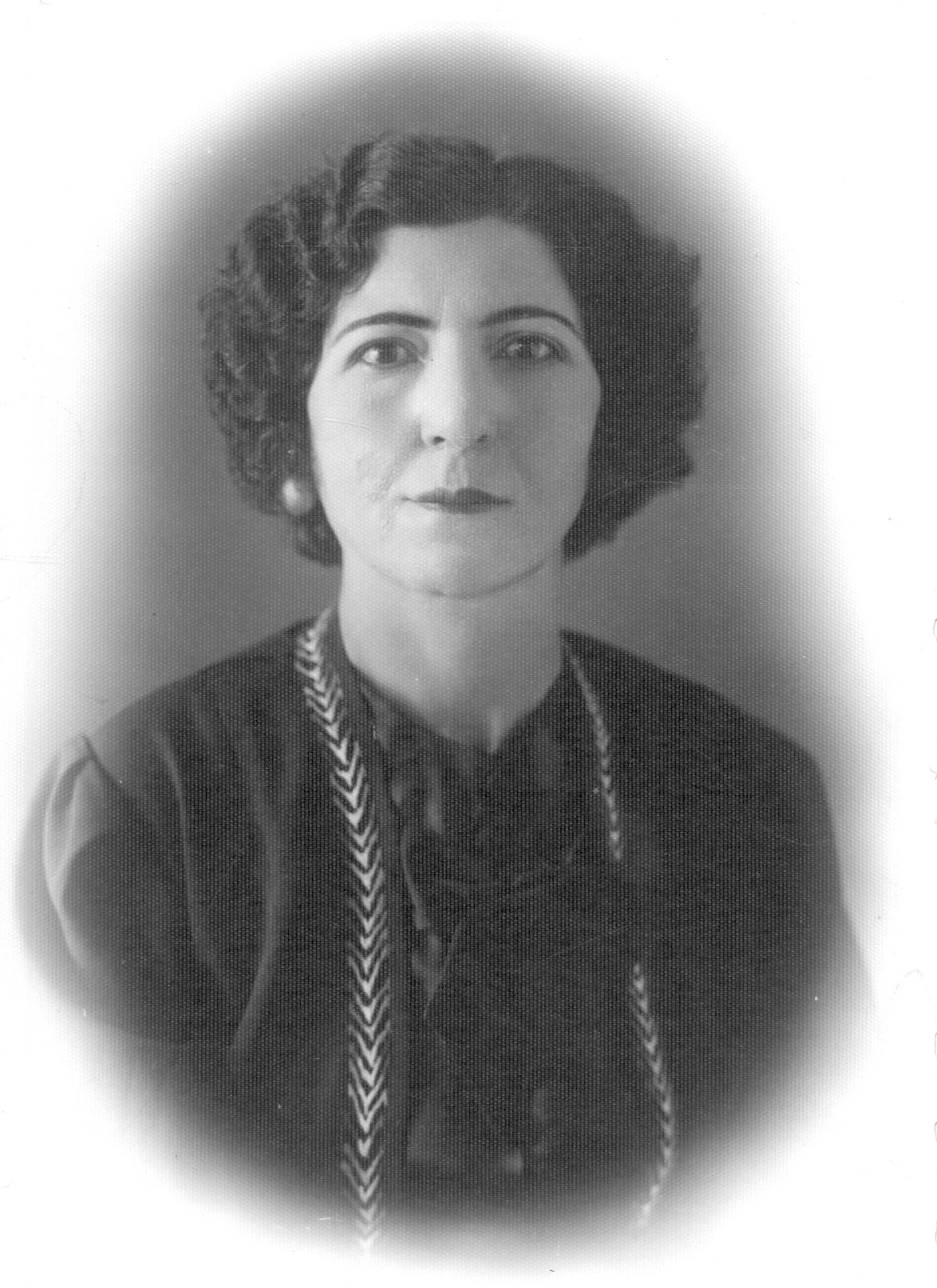

Queen consort of Iran
- Tenure: 16 July 1909 – 15 December 1925
- Born: Badr al-Molouk Vala; 1897; Tabriz, Qajar Iran
- Died: 23 May 1979 (aged 81–82); Tehran, Iran
- Burial: Behesht-e Zahra
- Spouse: Ahmad Shah Qajar (m. 1909; died 1930)
- Issue: Irandokht
- Badr al-Molouk Vala
- Dynasty: Qajar
- Father: Zahir as-Sultan Vala
- Mother: Afagh Khanom
- Religion: Shia Islam

Badr al-Molouk (Persian: بدرالملوک; 1897 – 23 March 1979), was the first wife of Ahmad Shah Qajar, the last Shah of the Qajar dynasty. She was the daughter of the Qajar Prince Zahir as-Sultan Vala and Afagh Khanom.

== Life ==
At four years old, her future mother-in-law, Princess Malekeh Jahan, arranged her marriage to Crown Prince Ahmad Mirza. She was educated at the only girls school in Tehran.

Badr al-Molouk was taken from school and married to Ahmad Mirza when she was twelve years old in 1909. The wedding was held by the Crown Prince's mother, Malekeh Jahan, and was a great ceremony. Later the same year, her spouse succeeded to the throne as Ahmad Shah Qajar. She did not play a public role during the reign of her spouse, since royal women at the time still lived in seclusion.

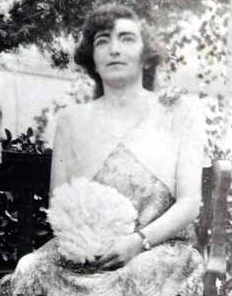
Badr-ol-Molouk, c. 1921

In 1923, her husband was de facto deposed, bringing an end to the Qajar dynasty's rule. She accompanied him to her mother-in-law in Baghdad and then to Lebanon and France. When Reza Shah, the new ruler of Iran, allowed members of the Qajar dynasty to return to Iran in the 1940s, she chose to come back and live in Tehran until her death in 1979.

She was the mother of Princess Irandokht (1915–1984), the Shah's second child.
