= Hossein-Qoli Nezam al-Saltaneh Mafi =

Iranian politician (1832–1908)

Hossein-Qoli Khan Mafi
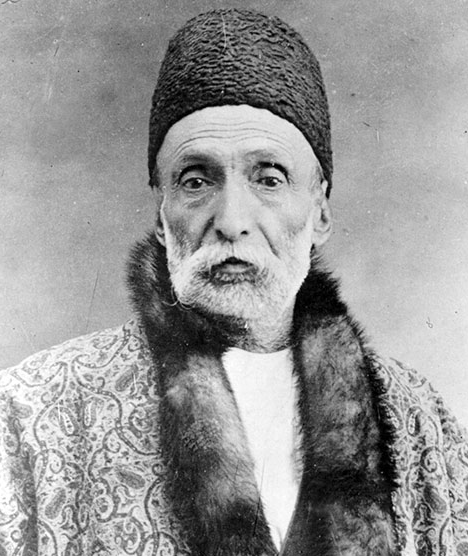
- Formal portrait c. 1900–08

4th Prime Minister of Iran
- In office 21 December 1907 – 21 May 1908
- Preceded by: Abolqasem Naser ol-Molk
- Succeeded by: Ahmad Moshir al-Saltaneh

Personal details
- Born: 1832 Tehran
- Died: 6 August 1908 (aged 75–76) Tehran
- Parent: Mohammad Sharif Khan Mafi Qazvini
- Nickname(s): Sa'ad ol-Molk; Nezam ol-Saltaneh

Mirza Hossein-Qoli Khan Mafi (Persian: میرزا حسینقلی خان مافی; 1832–1908), titled Sa'ad ol-Molk, (سعد‌الملک) and Nezam ol-Saltaneh, (نظام‌السلطنه) was an Iranian politician during the late Qajar period. He held many positions in his long government career, and served as the prime minister of Iran from December 21, 1907 to May 21, 1908.

== Biography ==
Hossein-Qoli was of Kurdish descent from the Mafi clan. Hossein-Qoli was born in 1832, in Tehran, and his father was Sharif Khan Mafi Qazvini, a high-ranking military commander and a minor governor, while his brothers also pursued military and bureaucratic careers. At the age of sixteen, upon the death of his father, he began working as a servant. He also studied the basics of Arabic and some jurisprudence, interpretation, and prosody until 1858, aged 22, when he first entered the Qajar government as the secretary of Morad Mirza Hesam ol-Saltaneh. He received the title Sa'ad ol-Molk early in his career and the title Nezam ol-Saltaneh later.

After serving as the secretary of Hesam ol-Saltaneh, he subsequently served as the governor of Bushehr, governor of Isfahan, governor of Yazd, governor of Bushehr and Dashtestan, head of the Persian Gulf Ports and Customs Administration (PGPCA), governor of Khamseh (Zanjan), governor of Arabestan, Chaharmahal, and Bakhtiari, governor of Bushehr and the PGPCA, governor of Fars, governor of Arabestan, Lorestan, and Bakhtiari, Minister of Justice and Commerce, Head of the Office of the Supreme Court and Minister of Finance, governor of Azerbaijan, governor of Isfahan, and Prime Minister of Iran, the final and most senior position he held. He succeeded Abolqasem Naser ol-Molk as prime minister and formed his cabinet on December 21, 1907. His function was to reconcile the Shah, Mohammad Ali Shah Qajar, with the Majles. During his premiership, he was increasingly overwhelmed by the escalating tensions between Mohammad Ali Shah and the Majles, which reached a breaking point following the attempted assassination of the shah in February 1908. Hossein-Qoli was caught between courtiers wishing to unseat him and more radical Majles deputies who considered him a reactionary. He resigned in May 1908, and clashes broke out weeks after.

He died in August 1908, just as the civil war was getting underway, and the last year of his life was worsened by the loss of his only son, Mirza Hossein Khan. He was buried in Imamzadeh Abdollah, Ray. Numerous contemporary accounts describe Hossein-Qoli as an aspirational, thoughtful, and trustworthy administrator. He was a devout Muslim and an ardent nationalist. He followed traditional social norms and, like his brother Mohammad-Hasan Khan, was against the growing trend of many of their peers copying everything that was European. Hossein-Qoli was a patron of the poets Iraj Mirza and Forsat-od-Dowleh Shirazi and was well-versed in classical Persian literature and Iranian history. His letters were frequently mixed with sayings and poetry. Hossein-Qoli described his tour to the ruins of the Sasanian city of al-Mada'in in Ottoman Iraq with a sarcastic sense of humor and a pragmatic approach to life in general. He wrote, "I beheld Mada'in, but took no heed," a reference to the famous poem by the 12th-century poet Khaqani in which the viewer at the ruins of Mada'in is cautioned to pay heed to the shifting fortunes and ravages of time.
