= Musavat (disambiguation) =

Musavat refers to the oldest existing political party in Azerbaijan.

Musavat may also refer to:

- Musavat (newspaper), Persian weekly newspaper published in Qajar Iran between 1907 and 1909
- Modern Musavat Party, political party in Azerbaijan
