= Mahmoud Mirza =

Iranian prince (1905–1988)

Mahmoud Mirza Qajar
- Prince; Soltan
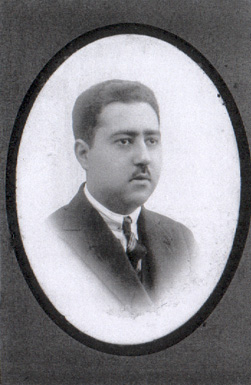
- Soltan Mahmoud Mirza in 1930

Head of the Qajar dynasty
- Tenure: 5 May – 2 June 1988
- Predecessor: Prince Soltan Hamid Mirza
- Successor: Prince Soltan Ali Mirza
- Born: 9 October 1905; Tehran, Iran
- Died: 2 June 1988 (aged 82); Évian-les-Bains, France
- Spouse: Effat Ashtiani
- Issue: 2
- Dynasty: Qajar
- Father: Mohammad Ali Shah Qajar
- Mother: Malekeh Jahan

Mahmoud Mirza Qajar (Persian: محمود میرزا قاجار; 9 October 1905 – 2 July 1988), Iranian prince of the Qajar dynasty, was a son of Mohammad Ali Shah Qajar.

He was head of the Qajar dynasty from the death of his nephew Hamid Mirza on 5 May 1988 until his own death on 2 July 1988.

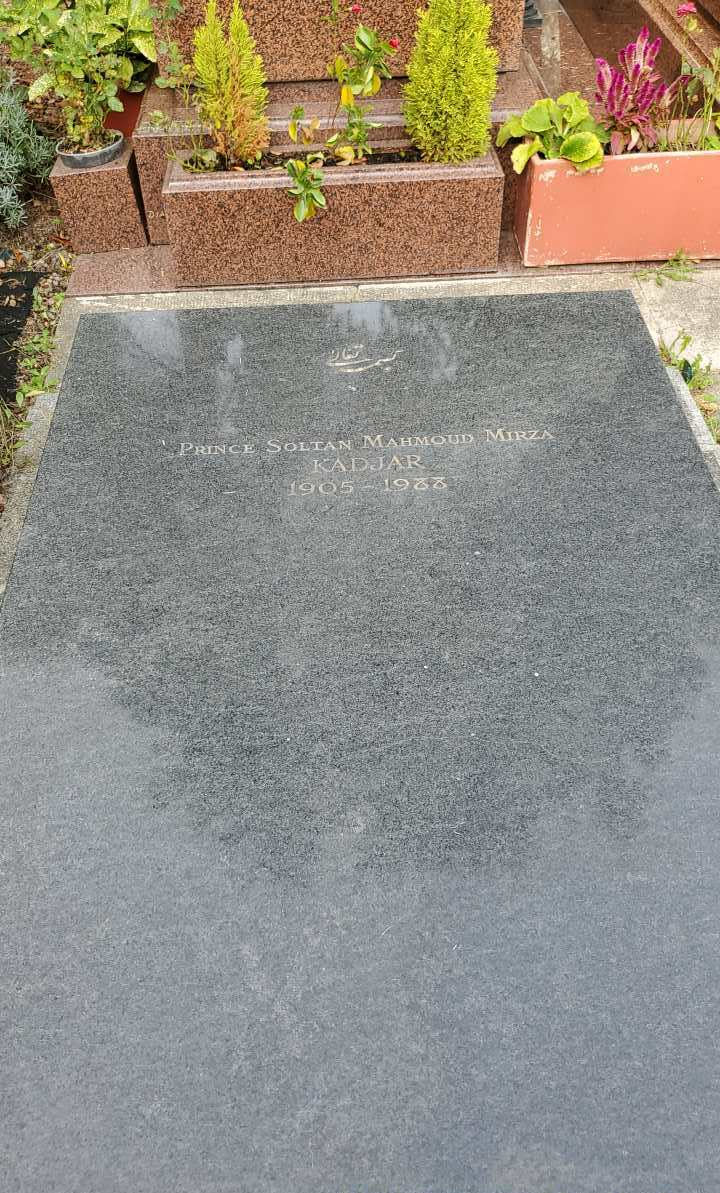
Mahmoud Mirza's grave, Paris

== Issue ==
He married Effat Ashtiani. They had a daughter and a son:

- Tourandokht (1/2 February 1940, Deauville – 7 December 2025, Paris) married to Keykhosro Kamrani (d. 8 January 2007) a descendant of Prince Kamran Mirza son of Naser al-Din Shah. She has two children: Djahangir Kamrani (b. 8 January 1970, Paris) and Navid (15 June 1981, Paris).
- Mohammad Ali Mirza (b. 23 May 1942, Paris). He is a banker. He was first married to Robin Kadjar-Wambold, daughter of Giti Afrouz daughter of Mohammad Hassan Mirza. They divorced without any children. From his second marriage to Charlotte Fournois, He has one daughter: Roxanne (b. 30 May 1993, Paris). Head of the Qajar dynasty since 2011.

Mahmoud Mirza Qajar dynasty Born: 9 October 1905 Died: 2 July 1988
Regnal titles
Preceded by Hamid Mirza	Head of the Imperial House of Qajar; 1988	Succeeded by Ali Mirza Qajar
