= Ahmad Moshir al-Saltaneh =

Iranian politician (1844–1918)

Moshir al-Saltaneh مشیرالسلطنه
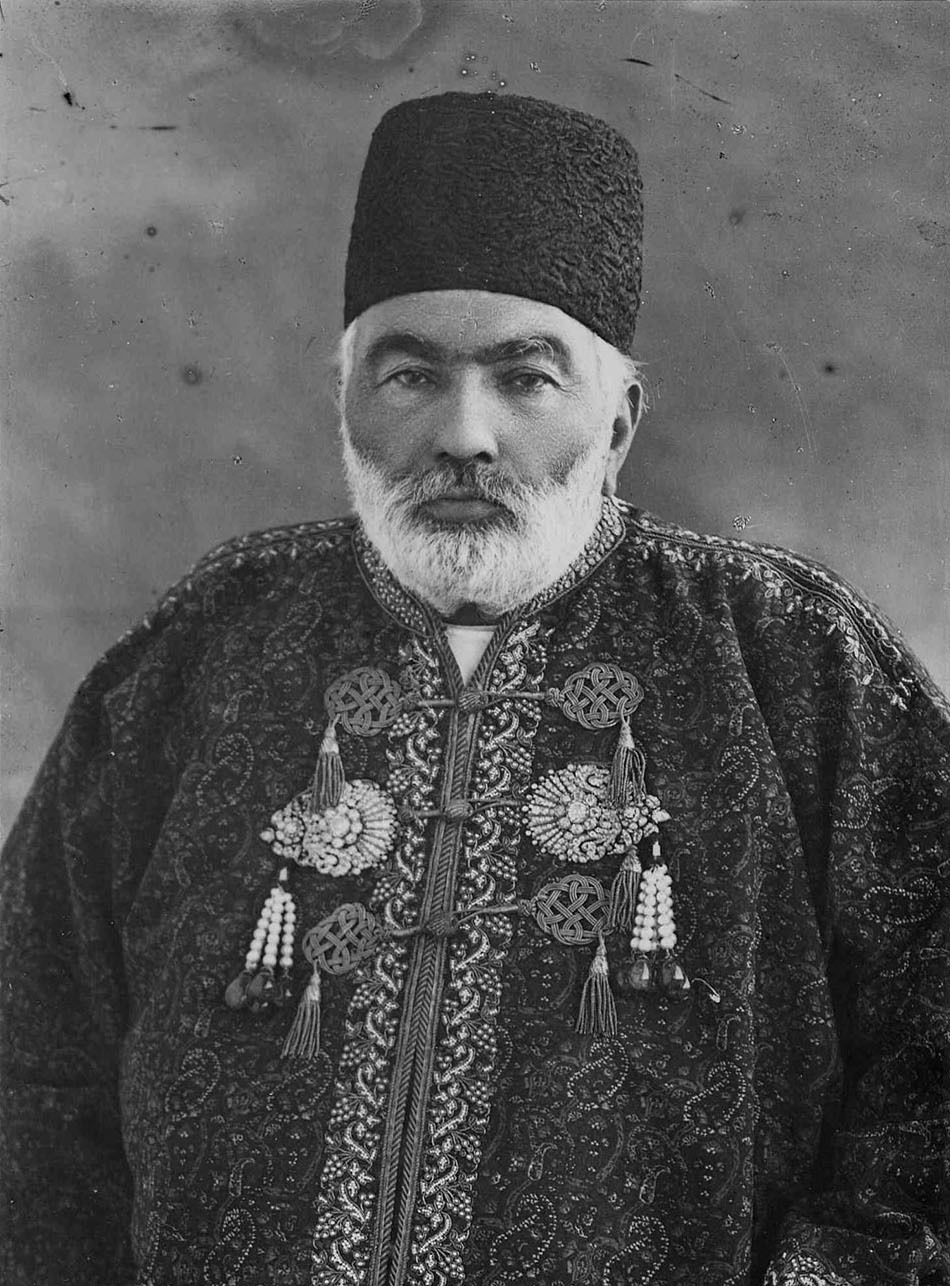
- Formal portrait c. 1910s

2nd Prime Minister of Iran
- In office 16 September 1907 – 27 October 1907
- Monarch: Mohammad Ali Shah Qajar
- Preceded by: Ali-Asghar Khan Atabak
- Succeeded by: Abolqasem Naser al-Molk
- In office 7 June 1908 – 29 April 1909
- Monarch: Mohammad Ali Shah Qajar
- Preceded by: Hossein-Qoli Nezam al-Saltaneh Mafi
- Succeeded by: Javad Sa'd al-Dowleh (Acting); Mohammad Vali Khan Tonekaboni

Personal details
- Born: 6 July 1844 Amol, Qajar Iran
- Died: 20 April 1918 (aged 73) Tehran, Qajar Iran
- Party: Independent
- Spouse: Behjat al-Saltaneh
- Relatives: Mahmoud Modir al-Dowleh (brother)

Ahmad Moshir al-Saltaneh (Persian: احمد مشیرالسلطنه; 6 July 1844 in Amol – 20 April 1918 in Tehran), also known as Moshir al-Saltaneh and Mirza Ahmad Khan Moshir al-Saltaneh, was a Prime Minister of Iran during the Qajar era. He served as prime minister twice and served as minister of interior. He was also Iran's Justice minister.

== Early life ==
Ahmad Moshir al-Saltaneh was born in Amol 1260 AH. He received the usual education of the time, and took time to learn calligraphy and writing. He also learned the basics of jurisprudence and principles. In 1280 A.H. at the invitation of his brother Moshir Nezam (Mahmoud Modir al-Dowleh), who was serving in the court of the crown prince (Mozaffar ad-Din Shah Qajar) in Tabriz, he came to the court and started working there. His handwriting and style of writing were liked and he was given the court's writing duties and, after a short period of time, he became the secretary and head of the court. He became the crown prince's office and earned the title of Monshi Bashi.

== Ministry ==
Moshir al-Saltaneh was in office for a total of eleven months and formed three cabinets, in all three cabinets he held the position of the Ministry of Interior. In the cabinet of Moshir al-Saltaneh, there were also legitimate people such as Mostowfi ol-Mamalek and Motamen al Molk, Moshir al-Dowleh and Mohtasham al-Saltaneh.

== Death ==
After leaving the Ottoman embassy, Moshir al-Saltaneh focused on his personal life and often spent his time worshiping and attending to the work of his mosque and school. In 1328 AH he was attacked when he was about to get out of his carriage, with several shots fired at him. The bullets hit his leg and he was treated for a long time until he finally died at the age of 77 in 1337 AH.

== Property ==
Mehdi Bayani, the founder and the first head of the National Library of Iran, said about the character and traits of Moshir al-Saltaneh, He did not have a secretary or head of office, and he directly faced the people and personally dealt with people's complaints. It was during his first chancellorship that a powerful prince like Seyf al-Dowleh was brought to trial against a collective complaint from the people of Kermanshah. Moshir al-Saltaneh was known for his resourceful and trustworthy, and he was one of the most powerful clerics and scribes and he was a leader in charity. He donated all his property.

Political offices
Preceded by Ali-Asghar Khan Atabak	Prime Minister of Iran; 1907	Succeeded by Abolqasem Naser al-Molk
Preceded by Hossein-Qoli Nezam al-Saltaneh Mafi	Prime Minister of Iran; 1908-1909	Succeeded by Kamran Mirza Nayeb es-Saltaneh
