= Fereydoun Mirza Qajar =

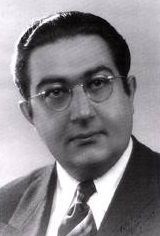

Head of the Qajar dynasty
- Tenure: 1943–1975
- Predecessor: Prince Mohammad Hassan Mirza
- Successor: Prince Hamid Mirza
- Born: 22 January 1922; Golestan Palace, Tehran, Iran
- Died: 24 September 1975 (aged 53); Geneva, Switzerland
- Spouse: Magdalina Ivanova Gevrenova
- Issue: Prince Teymour Mirza; Princess Cheyda Khanum; Princess Eylah Khanum
- Dynasty: Qajar
- Father: Ahmad Shah Qajar
- Mother: Fatemeh Khanum

Shahzada Fereydoun Mirza Qajar (Persian: فریدون میرزا قاجار; 22 January 1922 – 24 September 1975) was a son of Ahmad Shah Qajar, the last shah of the Qajar dynasty.

== Biography ==
Freydoun Qajar was born at the Golestan Palace, Tehran, on 22 January 1922. He was educated in the University of Geneva, Switzerland. In his last will, handwritten in French, Ahmad Shah Qajar willed Freydoun Mirza be his heir and crown prince. The point, however, was not pressed by Fereydoun Mirza's trustees, for personal and familial reasons. Mohammad Hassan Mirza retained the title of crown prince and declared himself Shah in exile in 1930. Freydoun was the Head of the Imperial House of Qajar after the death of his father on 27 February 1930. Freydoun died in Geneva, having had three children, one son, Teymour, and two daughters, Cheyda and Eylah (not in the line of succession).

Fereydoun Mirza Qajar Qajar dynasty Born: 22 January 1922 Died: 24 September 1975
Regnal titles
Preceded by Ahmad Shah	Head of the Imperial House of Qajar; 1930–1975	Succeeded by Hamid Mirza
Titles in pretence
Preceded by Mohammad Hassan Mirza	— TITULAR — Shah of Iran; Qajar dynasty 1943–1975; Reason for succession failure: Pahlavi dynasty became ruling house prior to the Iranian Revolution	Succeeded by Hamid Mirza
