= Farhad Sepahbody =

Iranian diplomat (1929–2014)

Farhad Sepahbody (August 20, 1929 – April 6, 2014) was an Iranian exile and career diplomat. He served as the Ambassador of Iran to Morocco from 1976 until 1979.

Sepahbody was born in Geneva, Switzerland, on August 20, 1929. He had two sisters. His father, Anushiravan Sepahbody, was an Iranian diplomat. Farhad Sepahbody was a descendant of Prince Abbas Mirza (1798–1833), a Qajar dynasty crown prince, through his father's lineage. His mother was also from a prominent Iranian family. Farhad Sepahbody lived with his parents in Switzerland, Italy, Russia, France, Spain, Turkey, and Egypt as a child, due to his father's diplomatic postings. The Sepahbody family was posted in Paris during the Battle of France in World War II. The family fled Paris shortly before Nazi German forces occupied the city. They escaped to Spain before returning to Iran during the war.

Farhad Sepahbody studied at the University of Paris in 1949 and the Edmund A. Walsh School of Foreign Service at Georgetown University. He also received a bachelor's degree in economics from New York University in 1953. He spoke fluent Persian, English, and French. He entered the Ministry of Foreign Affairs as a diplomat in 1955. He was posted to Iranian embassies and diplomatic missions to Switzerland, the United States, the United Kingdom, France, and the United Nations during his career.

Sepahbody served as the Ambassador of Iran to Morocco from 1976 until 1979, when the Iranian Revolution took place. Sepahbody was posted as Ambassador when Shah Mohammad Reza Pahlavi arrived in Morocco from Aswan, Egypt, just once week after he was overthrown and fled the country during the revolution. Ambassador Farhad Sepahbody resigned from the Iranian Foreign Ministry jin 1979 shortly after the execution of his cousin, former Prime Minister Amir-Abbas Hoveyda. He moved to New York City, with his wife, Angela Sepahbody, and their children. Sepahbody later helped the deposed Shah record his memoirs while the latter was living in exile in Mexico.

Sepahbody became a press consultant for the United Nations at its headquarters in New York City. He also worked as a journalist and diplomatic correspondent for Imapress, Paris from 1985 to 2003. In 2000, he was one of the founding members of the International Qajar Studies Association. Additionally, He Sepahbody managed Farah Pahlavi's official website until his death in 2014.

Sepahbody was diagnosed with a brain tumor in the early 1990s and given just one year to live. He and his wife moved to an Arizona ranch in 1992, shortly after his diagnosis, where they lived for more than twenty years. Farhad Sepahbody died at his home in Sedona, Arizona, on April 6, 2014, at the age of 85. He was survived by his wife and son, Dr. Cyrus Sepahbody.
