= Kamran Mirza Nayeb es-Saltaneh =

Iranian prince (1856–1929)

Kamran Mirza
- Nayeb es-Saltaneh
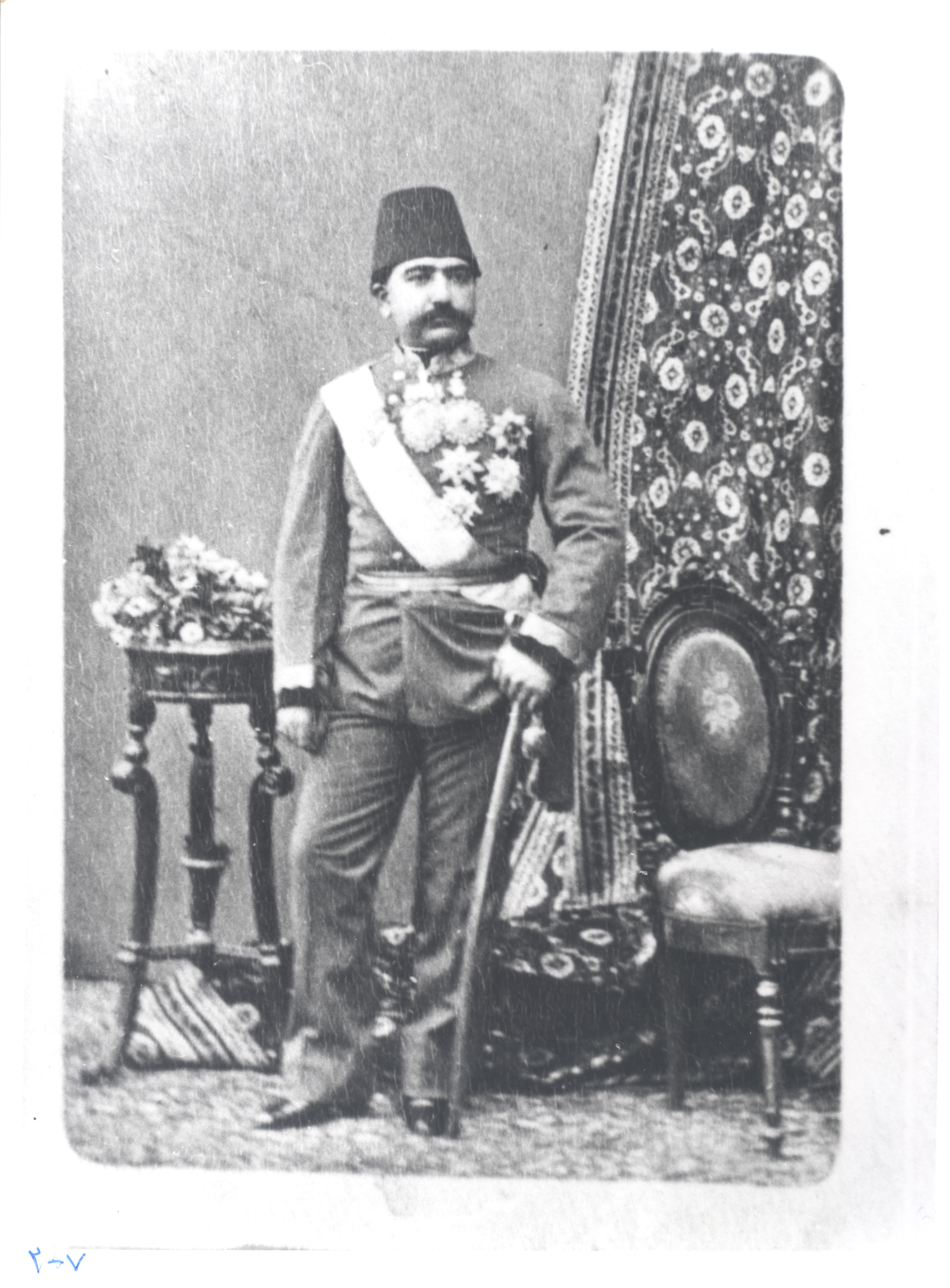

Minister of War
- 1st Tenure: 1880 – July 1896
- Predecessor: Mirza Hosein Sepahsalar
- Successor: Shoja al-Saltaneh
- 2nd Tenure: February 1906 – August 1906
- Predecessor: Vajihollah Mirza Sepahsalar
- Successor: Amir Bahador Jang
- 3rd Tenure: 21 March 1907 – 3 May 1907
- Predecessor: Dabir al-Dawla
- Successor: Mostowfi ol-Mamalek
- Born: 22 July 1856; Tehran, Sublime State of Iran
- Died: 15 April 1929 (aged 73); Tehran, Imperial State of Iran
- Burial: Qom, Fatima Masumeh Shrine
- Spouses: Sorour od-Dowleh
- Issue: Malekeh Jahan
- Dynasty: Qajar
- Father: Naser al-Din Shah Qajar
- Mother: Munir al-Saltaneh
- Religion: Twelver Shia Islam

Additional positions
- 1862–1863 1875–1876: Governor of Tehran
- 1878–1884: Governor of Qazvin and Gilan
- 1878–1884: Governor of Mazandaran

Kamran Mirza (Persian: کامران ميرزا نایب السلطنه; 22 July 1856 – 15 April 1929) was a Qajar prince and third surviving son of Naser al-Din Shah Qajar. He was a brother of Mass'oud Mirza Zell-e Soltan and Mozaffar ad-Din Shah Qajar. Kamran Mirza also served as Iran's Commander-in-Chief, appointed in 1868 for the first time, and Minister of War from 1880 to 1896 and from 1906 to 1907.

== Biography ==
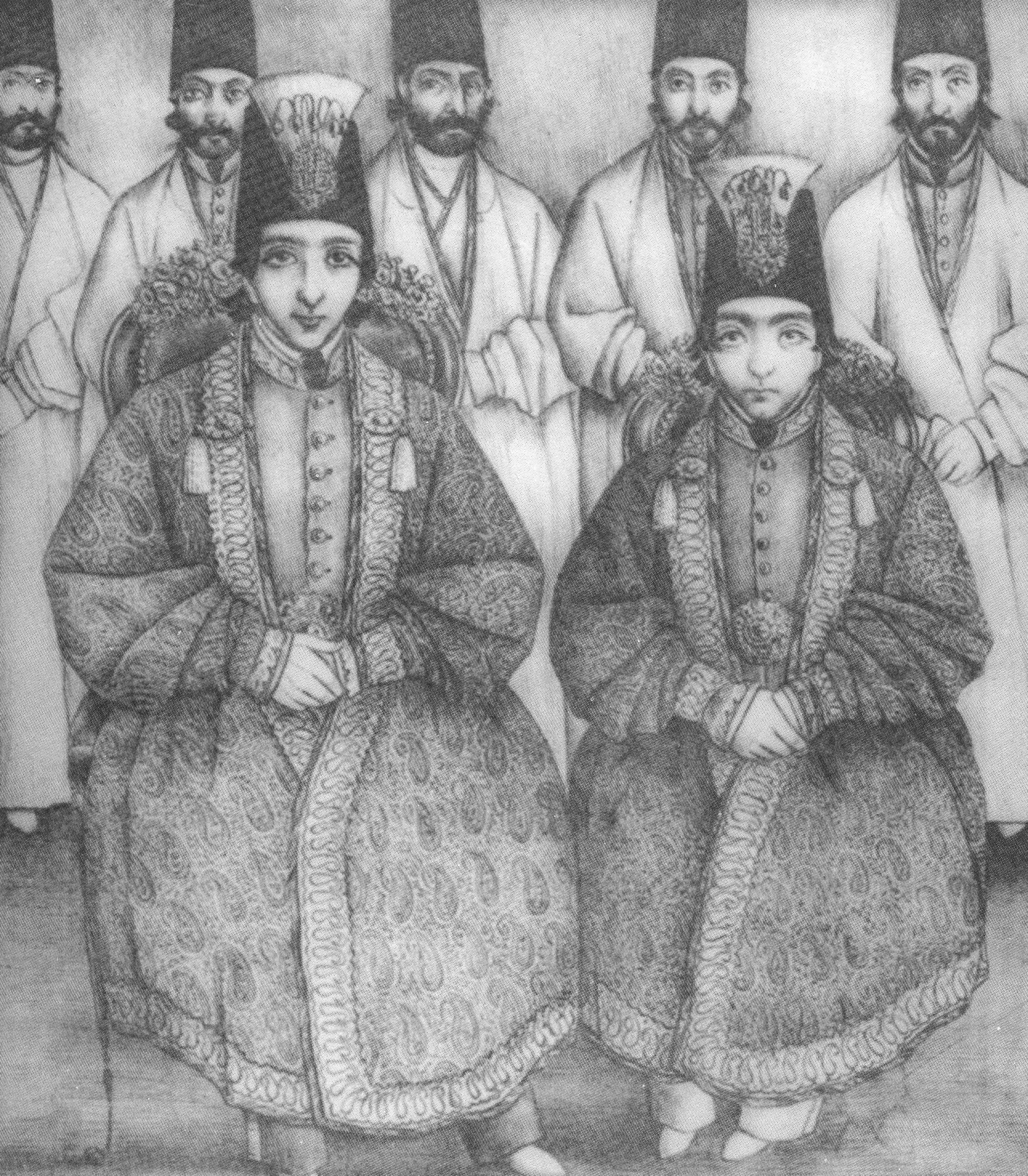
Illustration Mozaffar al-Din Mirza and Kamran Mirza by Sani al-Mulk

Kamran Mirza was born on 22 July 1856 in Tehran, to Naser al-Din Shah Qajar and Monir al-Saltaneh, the daughter of the chief architect, Mohammad-Taqi Khan. Due to Naser al-Din Shah's dislike of Mozaffar al-Din Mirza, Kamran Mirza was the Shah's favoured son for succession, but on account of the non-Qajar origin of his mother, like his other brother Mass'oud Mirza Zell-e Soltan, Kamran Mirza was not eligible for succession to the throne.

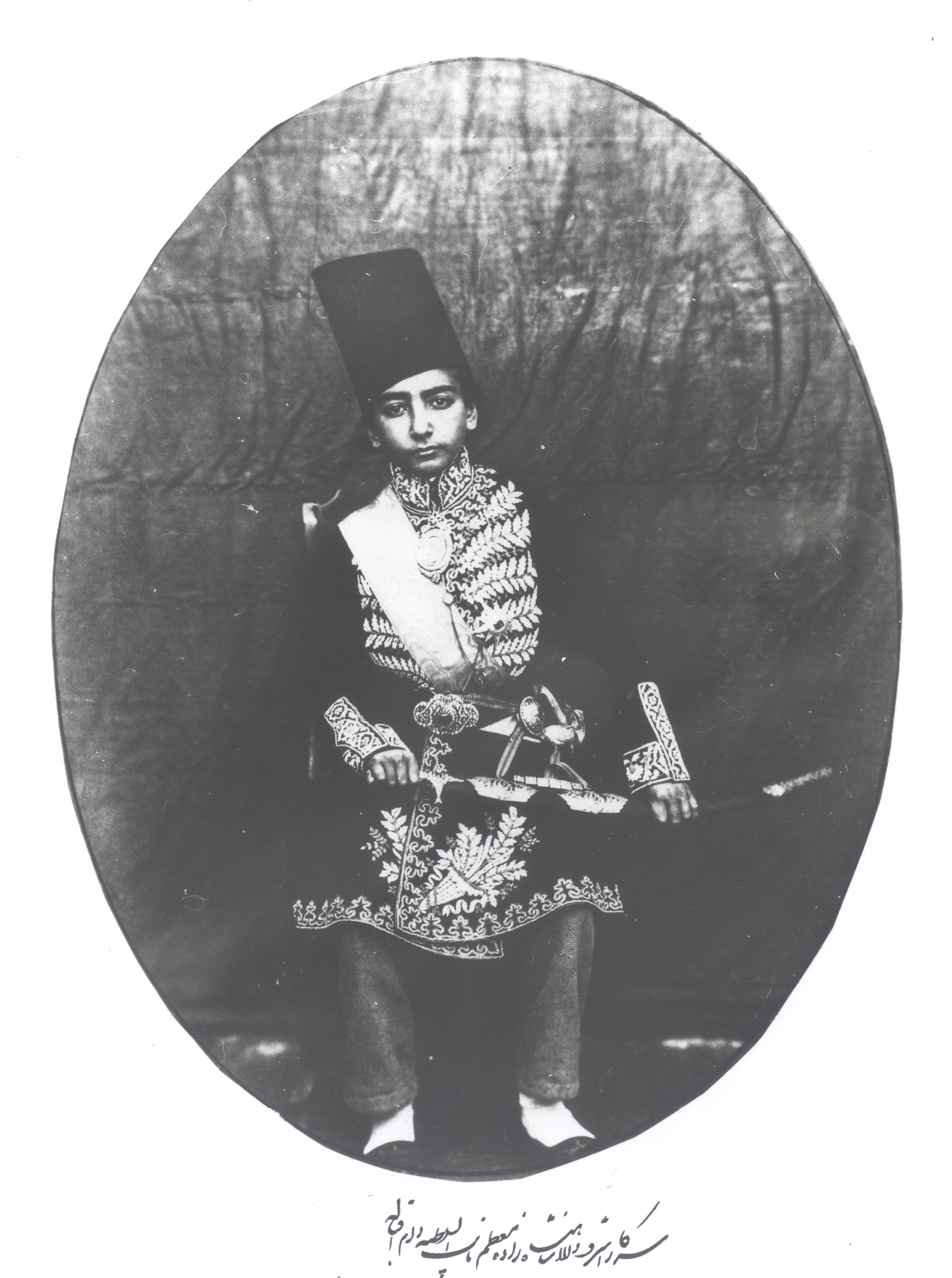
Young Kamran Mirza

He studied with private tutors and at the Dar al-Fonun in Tehran. In 1861, when he was 6, Naser al-Din Shah appointed him as the governor of Tehran with the stewardship of Pasha Khan Amin ol-Molk. In 1868, when Aziz Khan Mokri was exiled to Arak, Shah appointed Kamran Mirza as Commander-in-chief of the military and his father gave him the title Amir Kabir, grand commander, the highest rank in the Qajar military.

During the later decades of Naser al-Din Shah's reign, Kamran Mirza became a central figure in the administration of the Qajar Iran. His authority expanded particularly after the shah's return from Europe, when he was entrusted with the administration of Tehran and a wide range of provincial and governmental responsibilities. His control over the army and his position at the head of the capital’s administration made him one of the principal figures through whom the monarchy exercised power. His career was nevertheless marked by repeated political controversies, including accusations of corruption and arbitrary government. His conduct during the Tobacco Protest of 1891–1892, and his treatment of opponents and political prisoners, contributed to a lasting reputation for authoritarianism among later Persian historians.

Following the assassination of Naser al-Din Shah in 1896, Kamran Mirza retained an important position at court but increasingly aligned himself with conservative and royalist forces. He returned to the Ministry of War during the early years of the Persian Constitutional Revolution and became an important supporter of his son-in-law, Mohammad Ali Shah Qajar, during the struggle between the monarchy and the constitutionalists. He was briefly appointed prime minister during the final months of Mohammad Ali Shah’s reign in 1909. Although his political influence subsequently declined, he remained connected to the Qajar court and later served as governor-general of Khorasan under his grandson Ahmad Shah Qajar.

Kamran Mirza Nayeb es-Saltaneh died in Tehran on 15 April 1929, and was buried in Qom. The Kamranieh district in Northern Tehran belonged to him. He received the Order of the Royal Portrait, Temsaal-e Homayouni, from his father.

== Honours ==
- Order of the Royal Portrait (Temsal-e Homayouni) of Iran
- 1st Class of the Order of Neshan-e Aqdas of Iran
- 1st Class of the Order of the Lion and the Sun of Iran
- Knight of the Order of St. Andrew of Russia
- Knight of the Order of St. Alexander Nevsky of Russia
- Knight of the Order of St. Stanislas of Russia
- Knight of the Order of the White Eagle of Russia
- 1st class of the Order of St. Anne of Russia
- Grand cross of the Order of Leopold of Austria -1880

== Family ==
Nayeb es-Saltaneh was married to eleven wives. His first wife, Sorour ed-Dowleh was daughter of Morad Mirza Hessam os-Saltaneh Conqueror of Herat son of Abbas Mirza. They had four children, Princess Malekeh Jahan, wife of Mohammad Ali Shah Qajar and mother of Ahmad Shah Qajar; Ma’ssoumeh Khanom died in her youth, Qamar-ol-Moluk died when she was 14 and Fath Ali Mirza died aged five. Kamran Mirza also had 22 children from his other wives, 10 daughters and 12 sons.

=== Sons ===
- Prince Fat'h Ali Mirza
- Prince Mohammad Mehdi Mirza Zell-os-Saltaneh
- Prince Abbas Mirza E'ezaz-es-Saltaneh
- Prince Abdollah Mirza E'etezad Khaqan
- Prince Hassan Ali Mirza Farrokh-od-Dowleh
- Prince Soltan Salim Mirza Salar-e Aghdas
- Prince Ebrahim Mirza Salar-e A'azam
- Prince Mohmmad Reza Mirza Firouz-od-Dowleh
- Prince Mohammad Baqer Mirza Amir Arf'a
- Prince Hossein Ali Mirza Eghtedar-os-Saltaneh, married Anvar od-Dowleh daughter of Mozaffar din-Shah
- Prince Mohammad Taqi Mirza Nosrat-ol-Soltan
- Prince Mahmud Mirza Amir Akram

=== Daughters ===
- Princess Malekeh Jahan, mother of Ahmad Shah
- Princess Safieh Monir A'azam
- Princess Mahtaban Mo'azaz A'azam
- Princess Ensieh Houra
- Princess Farrokh A'azam
- Princess Banoo Olia
- Princess Nayyer A'azam
- Princess Fakhr-e Olia
- Princess Negar-ol-Molouk
- Princess Banoo Aghdas

== Sources ==
- Walcher, Heidi (2015). "KĀMRĀN MIRZĀ NĀYEB-AL-SALṬANA". In Yarshater, Ehsan (ed.). Encyclopædia Iranica (Online ed.). Encyclopædia Iranica Foundation.
- Amanat, Abbas (1997). Pivot of the Universe: Nasir al-Din Shah Qajar and the Iranian Monarchy, 1831-1896. Berkeley, California: University of California Press. ISBN 0-520-08321-0.
- Burrell, Robert Michael (1997). Iran Political Diaries 1881–1965. Vol. 1: 1881–1900. Slough: Archive Editions. ISBN 1852077107.
- Bamdad, Mehdi (1968). شرح حال رجال ایران در قرن ۱۲ و۱۳ و ۱۴ هجری [Biographies of the Dignitaries of Iran in the 12th, 13th, and 14th Centuries AH] (PDF) (in Persian). Vol. 3. Tehran: Zavvar.
- Bakhash, Shaul (1978). Iran: Monarchy, Bureaucracy and Reform under the Qajars: 1858–1896. London: Ithaca Press. doi:10.1017/S0020743800028002. ISBN 0902729365.
- Kazemzadeh, Firuz (1968). Russia and Britain in Persia, 1864-1914; a study in imperialism. New Haven, Connecticut: Yale University Press. ISBN 0598347852.
- Browne, Edward Granville (1910). The Persian revolution of 1905-1909. Cambridge: Cambridge University Press. doi:10.2307/1944538.
- Bayat, Mangol (1991). Iran's First Revolution: Shi'sm and the Constitutional Revolution of 1905–1909. New York: Oxford University Press. doi:10.1017/S0020743800060839.

Political offices
Preceded by Morteza Gholi Khan Hedayat	(possibly) Prime Minister of Iran; 1909	Succeeded by Javad Sa'd al-Dowleh
