= Javad Sa'd al-Dowleh =

Iranian politician (1856–1930)

Javad Sa'd al-Dowleh جواد سعدالدوله
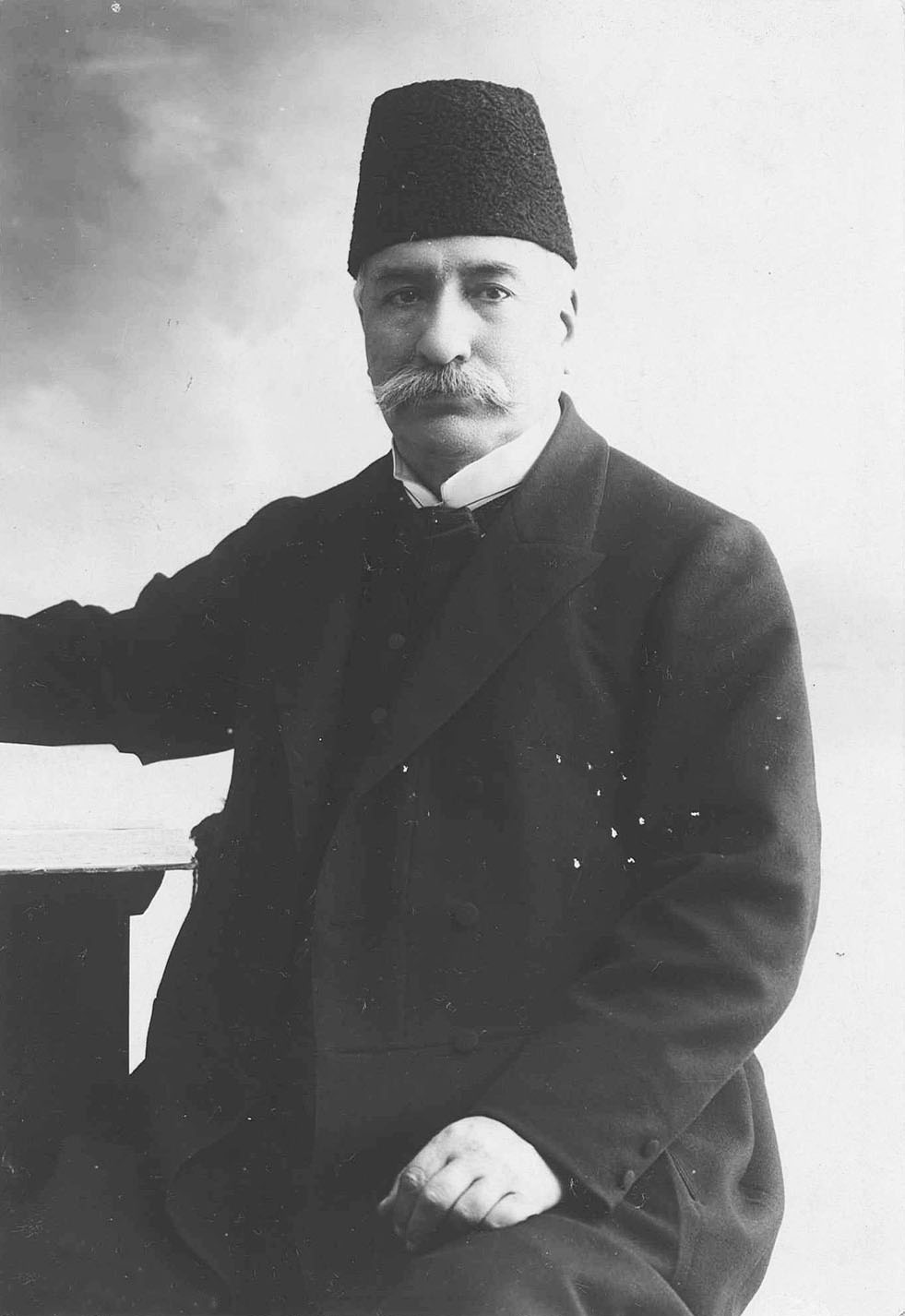
- Formal portrait c. 1910s

Acting Prime Minister of Iran
- In office 8 May 1909 – 13 July 1909
- Monarch: Mohammad Ali Shah Qajar
- Preceded by: Ahmad Moshir al-Saltaneh
- Succeeded by: Mohammad Vali Khan Khalatbari Tonekaboni

Personal details
- Born: 1856 Khoy, Qajar Iran
- Died: 3 February 1930 (aged 73–74) Tehran, Pahlavi Iran
- Resting place: Imamzadeh Abdollah, Ray
- Party: Independent

Javad Sa'd al-Dowleh (Persian: جواد سعدالدوله; 1856 in Khoy – 3 February 1930 in Tehran), was an acting Prime Minister of Qajar era Iran. Sa'd al-Dowleh was Iran's Ambassador to Belgium from 1893 to 1896.

Political offices
Preceded by Kamran Mirza Nayeb es-Saltaneh	Prime Minister of Iran; 1909	Succeeded by Mohammad Vali Khan Tonekaboni
