= Abolqasem Naser ol-Molk =

Iranian politician (1863–1927)

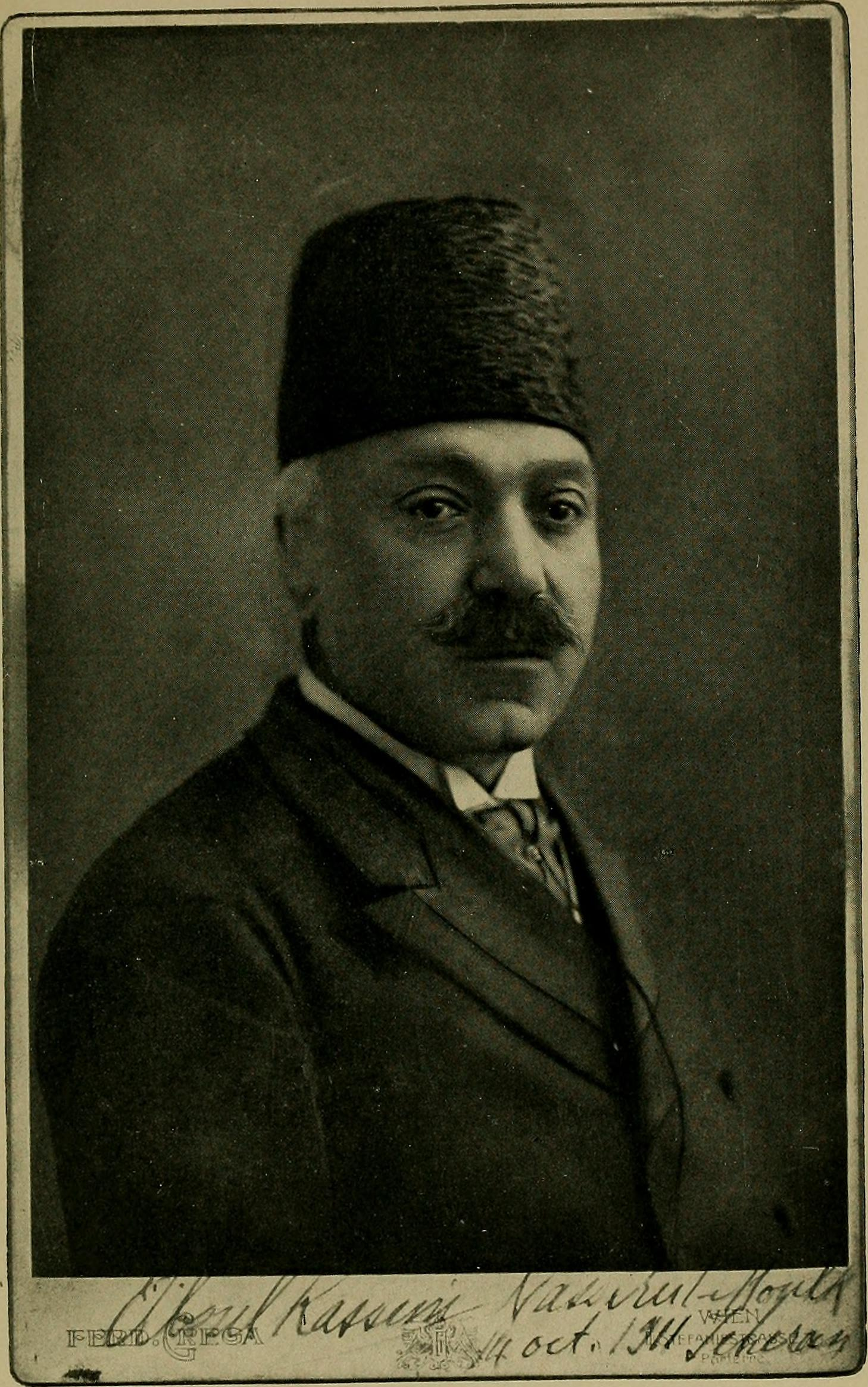

Regent of Iran
- In office March 1911 – 21 July 1914
- Appointed by: Parliament
- Monarch: Ahmad Shah
- Preceded by: Azod al-Molk

3rd Prime Minister of Iran
- In office 27 October 1907 – 21 December 1907
- Monarch: Mohammad Ali Shah Qajar
- Preceded by: Moshir al-Saltaneh
- Succeeded by: Nezam al-Saltaneh

Minister of Finance
- In office 1904–1906
- Monarch: Mozaffar ad-Din Shah
- Prime Minister: Eyn od-Dowleh
- In office February 1897 – June 1898
- Monarch: Mozaffar ad-Din Shah
- Prime Minister: Amin od-Dowleh

Vali of Kurdistan
- In office 1900–1904
- Monarch: Mozaffar ad-Din Shah
- Prime Minister: Amin al-Soltan

Personal details
- Born: 13 July 1856 Sheverin, Sublime State of Iran
- Died: 26 December 1927 (aged 71) Tehran, Imperial State of Iran
- Party: Moderate Socialists Party
- Children: 3
- Relatives: Hossein Ala (son-in-law)
- Education: Balliol College, University of Oxford; Ecole des Sciences Politique
- Awards: Order of Saint Michael and Saint George

Abu'l-Qasem Khan Qaragozlu (Persian: ابوالقاسم‌خان قراقزلو), known by the title Naser ol-Molk (Persian: ناصرالملک, lit. 'Assistant of the Realm'), (13 July 1856 – 26 December 1927) was an Iranian politician who served as Regent, Prime and Finance Minister of Iran during the Qajar era.

== Early life ==
Naser ol-Molk studied at the Balliol College, Oxford, from 1879 to 1882. Among his classmates were Sir Edward Grey, later British Foreign Secretary, and Cecil Spring Rice, later British Ambassador to Tehran and Washington, D.C..

== Political career ==
=== Prime minister ===
After returning to Iran, he became an interpreter for Naser al-Din Shah. Later, he served as finance minister, then as governor, and for a short time as prime minister during the period of the Constitutional Revolution of Iran in the reign of Mohammad Ali Shah Qajar in 1907. However, under pressure from some parliamentarians he resigned. Because he failed to ask Mohammed Ali Shah for his permission before resigning, the latter had him arrested. Naser ol-Molk was released from prison only after an intervention by the British ambassador. Seeing his life threatened, he fled to England.

=== Regent ===
He did not return to Iran until after the fall of Mohammed Ali Shah in the summer of 1909 where he was installed as Regent for the infant Ahmad Shah Qajar and assumed the office of prime minister once again for a short time. He held the office of Regent until Ahmad Shah came of age in 1914. In a deep political character analysis of Naser ol-Molk, the American treasurer-general of Iran, William Morgan Shuster, suggested that he showed a lack of strong leadership in his office.

== Life in England ==
In 1915, Naser ol-Molk left Iran and lived in England until his death. In 1919, he made another political appearance as an advisor to Lord Curzon in the drafting of the Anglo-Persian Agreement of August 1919. He died in 1927 at the age of 64.

== Literary activities ==
Naser ol-Molk translated William Shakespeare's Othello into Persian in 1916, under the title Dastan-e gham-angiz-e Otello-ye maghrebi dar Venedik. It was published for the first time in Paris in 1917. It was staged in Tehran in 1932, with the Soviet Armenian actor Vahram Papazian playing the lead role (since Papazian did not know Persian, he said his lines in French, while the other actors spoke in Persian). Naser ol-Molk also translated Shakespeare's The Merchant of Venice.
