= International Museum for Family History =

Coordinates: 50°46′44″N 5°42′25″E

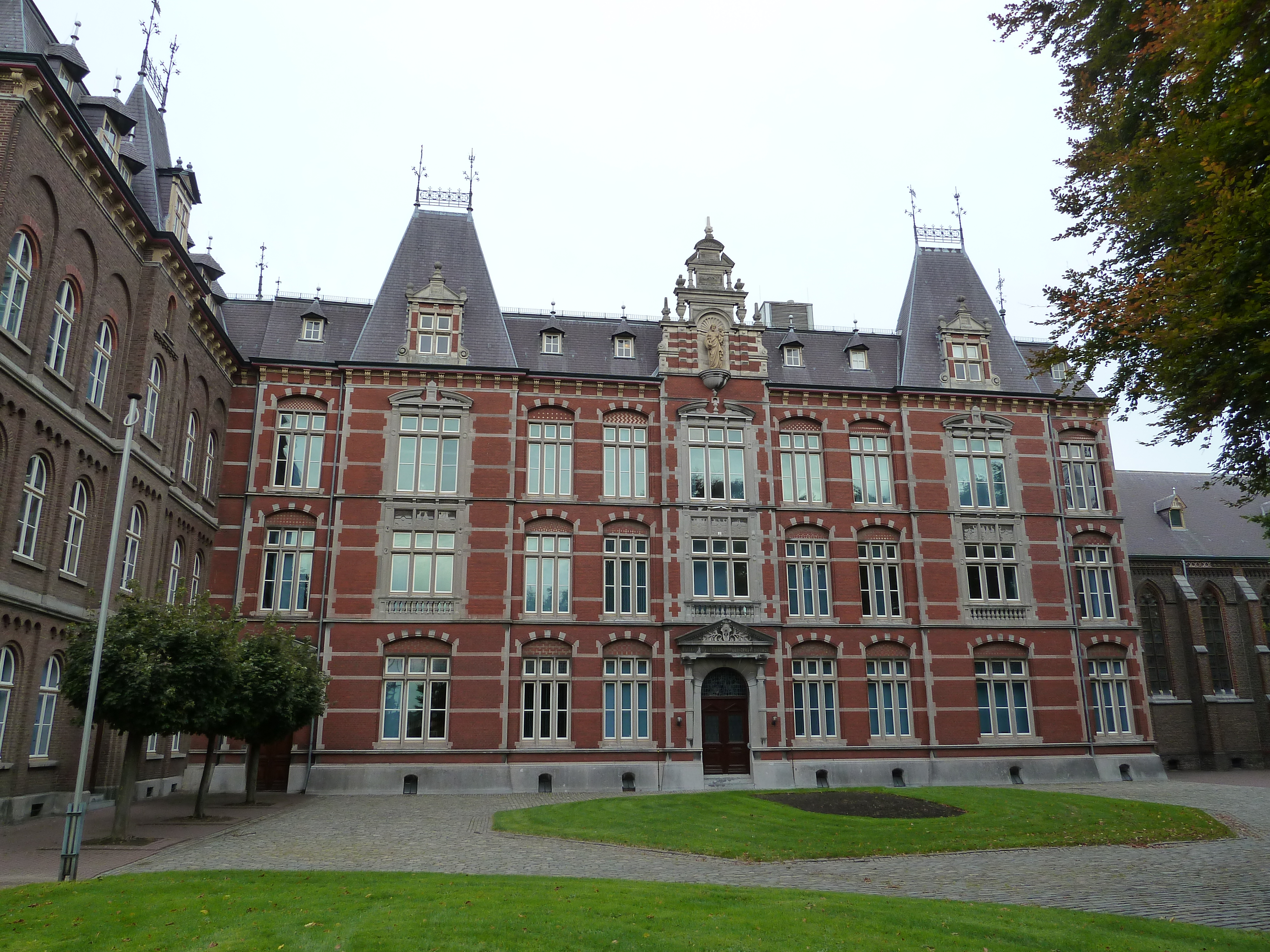
- Facade of the Family Museum, Eijsden
- Established: 6 May 2014
- Location: Breusterstraat 27, 6245EH, Eijsden
- Director: Leo Barjesteh
- Curators: Dr. Ir. J.M.M. Jo Ritzen (chairman of friends foundation); W.H.A.M. Poolen-Lendemeijer (Volunteer Coordinator); Dr Sara Khosrovani (head Visual Art); Dr Sahar Khosrovani (Genetic genealogy); Marie Janssen-Rutten (head heritage Ursulines)
- Architect: the school of P.J.H. Cuypers
- Website: www.ursulinenconvent.com

The Internationaal Museum voor Familiegeschiedenis (known in English as the International Museum for Family History, or in short "The Family Museum") is a museum located in the former Ursuline Convent in Eijsden, Netherlands. As a museum with a focus on genealogy and family history, it is the first museum of its kind in the world.

The Ursuline sisters commissioned Pierre Cuypers to renovate and extend the building in 1899. It is probable that Cuypers entrusted part of the project to Johannes Kayser, a Dutch architect notable for his neogothic designs.

The museum focuses especially on genealogy, DNA-research, the life and work of Eugène Dubois, human evolution, heraldry, Charlemagne, family law and the working lives of our ancestors. the museum also houses the office, archives and collections of the International Qajar Studies Association.

The museum is a "Public Benefit Organisation" (Algemeen nut beogende instelling) and it has won awards such as the 'VVV price for innovation'.

The advisory board of the museum includes notable figures such as former Prime Minister of the Netherlands Dries van Agt, American historian at Yale University Ned Blackhawk, professor Michel Hockx of the University of Notre Dame, professor of Russian and Inner Asian history at Brock University David Schimmelpenninck van der Oye, and professor Tudor Parfitt.
