= Malekeh Jahan =

Queen consort of Iran (1875–1947)

- Photograph of Malekeh Jahan

Queen consort of Iran
- Tenure: 3 January 1907 – 16 July 1909
- Born: 21 June 1875; Tehran, Iran
- Died: 5 November 1947 (aged 72); Sanremo, Italy
- Burial: Imam Husayn Shrine, Kerbala, Iraq
- Spouse: Mohammad Ali Shah Qajar
- Issue: Gholam Hossein Mirza; Ahmad Shah Qajar; Mohammad Hassan Mirza; Soltan Mahmoud Mirza; Soltan Majid Mirza; Khadijeh Khanum; Assieh Khanum
Names
- Malekeh Jahan
- Dynasty: Qajar
- Father: Kamran Mirza Nayeb es-Saltaneh
- Mother: Sorour ol-Dowleh
- Religion: Shia Islam

Malekeh-Jahan (Persian: ملکه جهان; 21 June 1875 – 5 November 1947) was the queen consort of her cousin Mohammad Ali Shah of Iran, and the mother of Ahmad Shah Qajar. She played a political role during the reign of her husband as a supporter in his struggle against the Constitutional Party.

== Life ==
She was a member of the Qajar dynasty as the daughter of Prince Kamran Mirza Nayeb es-Saltaneh and Sorour ol-Dowleh.

In 1892, she married her cousin, Mohammad Ali Shah. The marriage was arranged. Her cousin had to divorce his first wife prior to their wedding, and out of consideration for her status, he did not marry another after their wedding.

=== Reign of Mohammad Ali Shah ===
In 1907, her spouse succeeded to the throne. When she became queen, she naturally was called Queen Jahan. However, Queen Jahan also can be interpreted as Malekeh-ye Jahan or "Queen of the World".

Malekeh Jahan was acknowledged to have played a political role during the reign of Mohammad Ali Shah. Her husband's reign took place during a period of intense struggle between the monarch and the Constitutionalists. She was reportedly against the Constitutional system because she viewed the constitution as weakening royal power, since it placed the power of appointments at the disposal of the parliament rather than the royal court. She viewed this state of affairs as detrimental to the political career of her father and brother, particularly since her father lost his office as cabinet minister. The tension between her and the Constitutionalists deteriorated further after the assassination attempt at her husband, and the political slander directed at her because of the rumours that she was encouraging her husband in his conflict against the Constitutionalists. She was described as one of the biggest supporters of her spouse in his attempts to suppress the Constitution party.

=== Later life ===
In 1909, the conflict between the crown and the Constitutionalists ended in the deposition of Mohammad Ali Shah. The royal family took refuge in the Russian Embassy. Her spouse was declared deposed and her 11-year old son Ahmad Shah Qajar declared as his successor. She initially refused to deliver her son to the opposition, and the Russian Ambassador suggested to the opposition that the younger son should be monarch instead. This suggestion was apparently made by the ambassador on the request of Mohammad Ali Shah under the influence of Malekeh Jahan. Eventually, she agreed to deliver her son.

After the deposition, she and her husband left for Odessa, where they lived until the Russian revolution, when they left for Western Europe and France. When she was widowed in 1925, she wished to return to Iran. However, the same year her son was deposed. She joined her son and his family and lived with them in their exile in France.

She was the writer of "Borhan-ol-Iman" (which means proof of faith) which contains some supplications and praying notes.

== Gallery ==
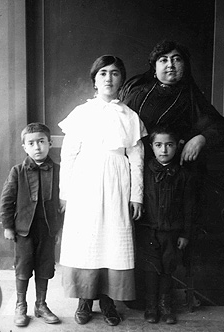
Malekeh Jahan with her children

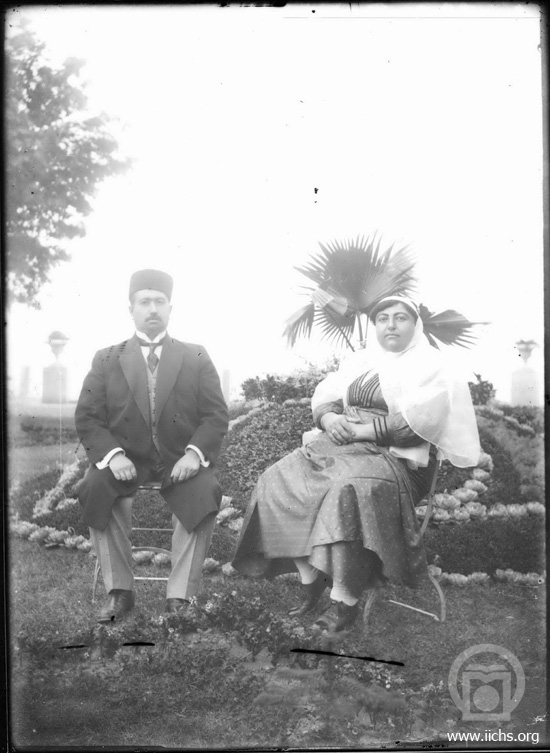
Mohammad Ali Shah Qajar & Malekeh Jahan in Odessa

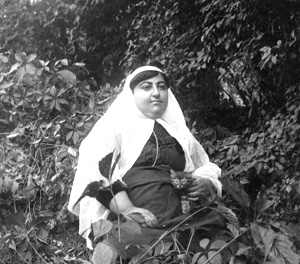
Photograph of Malekeh Jahan
