= Mansoureh Ettehadieh =

Iranian historian and publisher

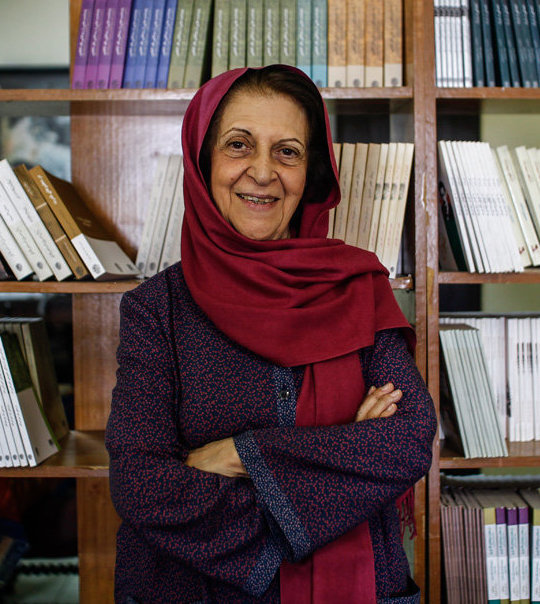
Image of Mansoureh Ettehadieh

Mansoureh Ettehadieh (born 27 February 1934; Persian: منصوره اتحادیه) is an Iranian historian and publisher. She obtained MA and PhD degrees from the University of Edinburgh in 1956 and 1979, respectively. Her PhD thesis was "Origin and development of political parties in Persia 1906-1911". From 1963 until her retirement in 2000, she taught in the History Department at Tehran University.

In 1983, she founded a publishing firm, Nashr-e Tarikh-e Iran, which focuses on the history of the Qajar period. In addition to many scholarly works, she has written two novels, Zindigi Bayad Kard and Zindigi Khali Nist. In 2000, she was also one of the founding members of the International Qajar Studies Association (IQSA).
