= Irandokht Qajar =

Iranian princess (1915–1984)

- Princess of Iran
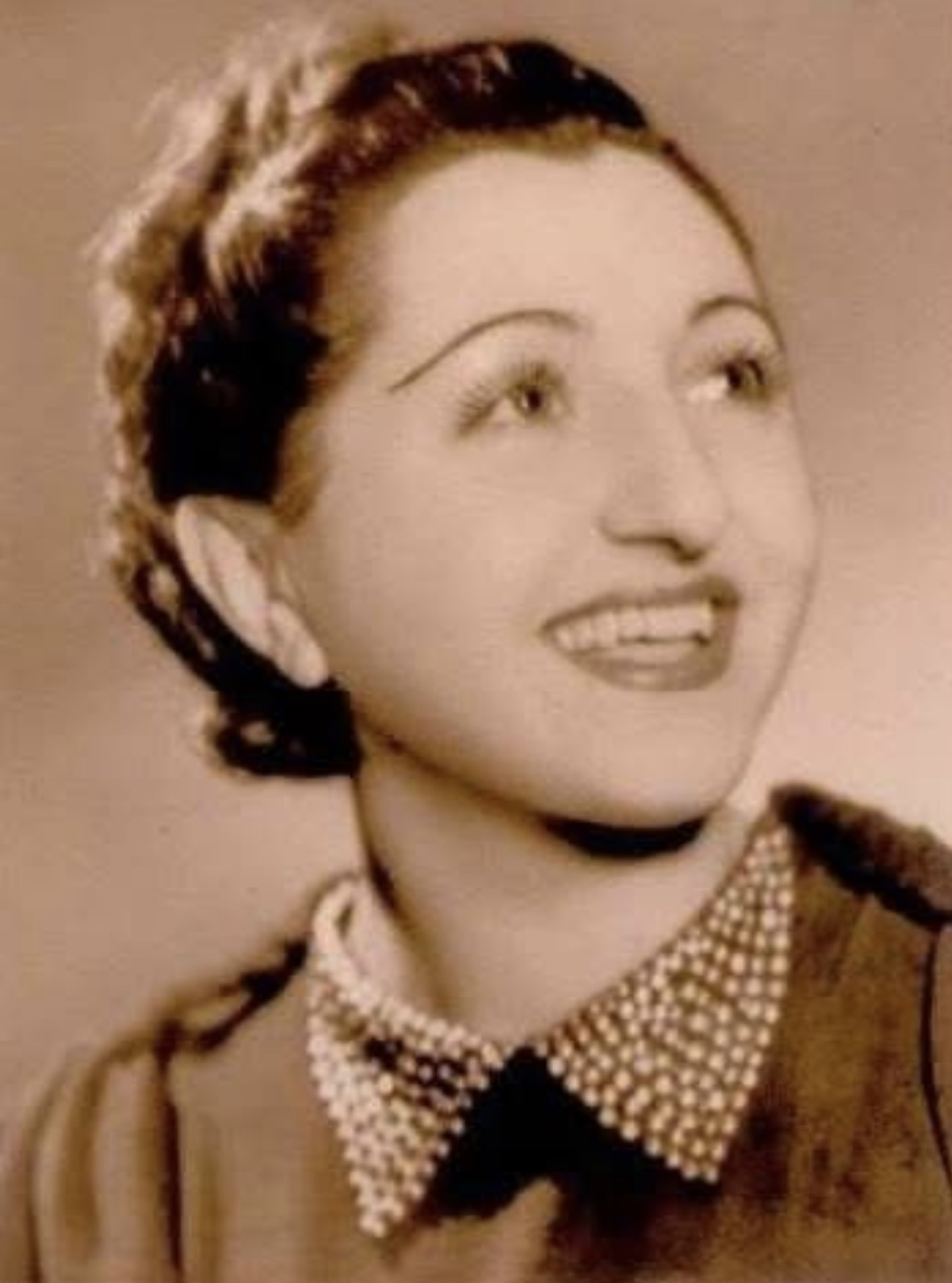
- Born: 17 November 1915; Tehran, Qajar Iran
- Died: 1984 (aged 68–69); Tehran, Iran
- Spouse: Abbas Faroughy
Names
- Irandokht Qajar
- Dynasty: Qajar
- Father: Ahmad Shah Qajar
- Mother: Badr al-Molouk
- Religion: Shia Islam

Irandokht Qajar (Persian: ایران‌دخت قاجار; 17 November 1915 – 1984) was an Iranian princess.

She was the first child of Badr al-Molouk and Ahmad Shah Qajar, the last ruling member of the Qajar dynasty. In 1925, her father was deposed and she left the country with her parents at 10 years old.

While Mohammad Reza Pahlavi was studying in Switzerland, he saw Irandokht and fell in love with her, telling his father, Reza Shah, about her. After Irandokht's arrival in Tehran, Reza Shah would not allow them to get married. Following his divorce from Fawzia of Egypt, Mohammad Reza, who was now Shah, seems to have again considered marrying Irandokht, who was by then also separated from her first husband, but was dissuaded by the fact that she had already had three children.

Irandokht returned to Europe and married Abbas Faroughy. She had three grandchildren: Mariam, Darius, and Cyrus.
