= International Qajar Studies Association =

The International Qajar Studies Association (IQSA) is an association specialised in the study of the Qajar Era and the Qajar dynasty. The association organises conferences, study days, lectures, cultural events and exhibitions, publishes books, a Journal (Qajar Studies) and a regular newsletter, runs a Studies and Documentation Centre and brings together scholars from across the globe. The association also assisted in establishing the Harvard University project Women's World in Qajar Iran: A digital Archive and Website and co-funded the foundation of the Centre for the Study of the International Relations of the Middle East and North Africa (Cirmena) of the University of Cambridge.

== Objective writing on the history of the Qajars ==
In the years leading up to the year 2000 several individuals were actively but separately looking for a vehicle for the study of the Qajar Era. Among these persons, were, in Europe: Leo Barjesteh, Ali Mirza Qajar, Hans Timmermans, Willem Vogelsang, Gillian Vogelsang-Eastwood and Corien Vuurman, in the United States: Manoutchehr Eskandari-Qajar, Farhad Sepahbody and Majid Tehranian, and in Iran: Bahman Bayani, Mansoureh Ettehadieh and Bahman Farman Farmaian. The study and writing on the history of the era had seen its difficulties since the fall of the Qajar dynasty. In Iran in the 1990s this situation seemed to change and the time to start an association to facilitate a more objective study of the period seemed opportune.

== Foundation and activities ==
In 2000, the International Qajar Studies Association was founded and registered in Santa Barbara in the United States. May 2000 saw the first meeting of IQSA at the premises of the publishing house (Nashr-e Tarikh-e Iran) of Dr. Mansoureh Ettehadieh in Tehran. An Advisory Board was formed with eminent scholars in the field. The first IQSA conference was held on May 17–19, 2001. This inaugural conference ‘Reading early photographs: visual sources for the interpretation of Iranian Qajar history’ took place at Leiden University. Following its inaugural conference in 2001, IQSA has hosted meetings at numerous academic institutions across Europe and the United States, including Corpus Christi College, Cambridge, St Antony's College, Oxford, Austrian Academy of Sciences and Boston University (2012). In 2015, the board decided to alternate between biyearly international conferences and annual Qajar Studies Days (lectures and workshops) held at a fixed location.

Since 2000, IQSA published five books (Qajar Era Dress, Qajar Era Health, the Montabone Album, Nineteenth-century Persia in the Photographs of Abert Hotz and Putting the Shah in the Landscape) and sixteen journals (Qajar Studies). From 2024 IQSA will publish a new series 'Hezar Famil', containing genealogies of prominent Iranian families.
