= Mafi (tribe) =

Kurdish tribe living mainly in Iran

The Mafi (Kurdish and Persian: مافی) are a Kurdish tribe living mainly in various regions of Iran. They speak several languages and mainly follow Shia Islam.

== History ==
The Mafi tribe was originally from Kermanshah, although before the Safavid period, they had migrated and settled in Lorestan where they later became part of the Beyranvand tribe, but were relocated to Fars province by the Safavids. They also established relations with the Zand dynasty, but were then moved from Fars to Qazvin by Agha Mohammad Shah Qajar. They were described as a Kurdish tribe. Willem M Floor noted that there was a historic tribe in Iranian Kurdistan named Mafi or Ma'afi, meaning "exempt from taxes", while Hafez Farmayan wrote that "the Mâfi (or Maʿâfi) were one of the tribes of the confederation of southern Kurdish tribes known as the Lak." Sheerin Ardalan mentioned them as the "Mâfi-vand". Zain al-Abidin Shirvani mentioned the Mafi as one of the Lak tribes alongside the Zand, Bajalan, and Zandi-yi Kala, reportedly the tribe of Karim Khan. Historical sources mentioned that in 1791/2 a "group of Mafi and Nankoli Lak Kurds joined army of Lotf Ali Khan". Heribert Busse mentioned them as a southern Kurdish tribe and part of the Lak. Heidi Walcher simply mentioned them as "the Kurdish Māfī tribe of Fārs". William Eagleton, and Parviz Tanavoli had mentioned them as a Kurdish tribe of Qazvin, and Tanavoli added that they lived around Alamut. The Mafi tribe historically neighbored the Kurdish tribes of Sanjabi, Bajalan, Moradi, and Talabani around Kermanshah.
