= Monir al-Saltaneh =

Iranian royal consort

Monir al-Saltaneh (Persian: منیرالسلطنه) was a royal consort of Naser al-Din Shah Qajar of Iran (r. 1848–1896).

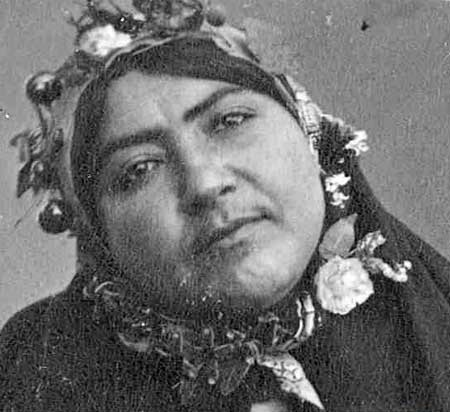
Photograph of Monir al-Saltaneh, c. 1880s

She was the Shah's temporary wife, which means she was classificed as a concubine. She was known for her many donations. A street and the city quarter Monirieh in Tehran were named after her.
