= Leo Barjesteh =

Dutch-Persian Historian

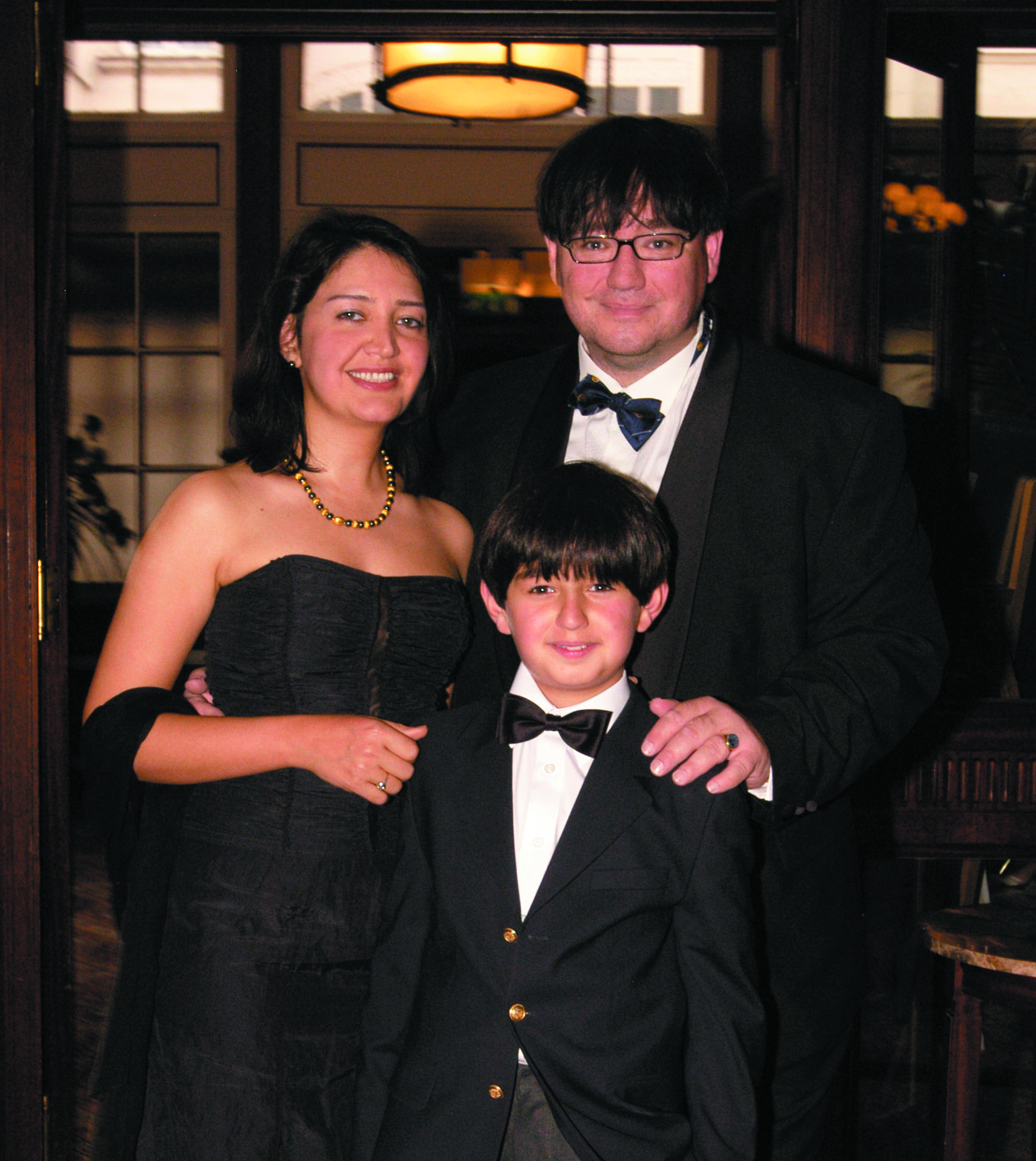
Ferydoun (Leo) Barjesteh van Waalwijk van Doorn with wife Sahar Khosrovani and son Shayan at Kadjar (Qajar) Family Association Gala.

Leonardus Alexander Ferydoun "Leo" Barjesteh van Waalwijk van Doorn (born 18 October 1962 in Rotterdam) is a Dutch-Persian historian, publisher and museum director.

In 1988 Barjesteh established his publishing firm, specialising in history, culture and genealogy. He is also co-founder (2000) and since 2017 president of the International Qajar Studies Association and has been editor-in-chief of its journal (Qajar Studies) since the first issue in 2000. Also in 2000, he was (together with Jan Bomans, lieutenant colonel Eppo Brongers and Ad Vermeulen) one of the initiators of the monument for Johan Willem Friso, Prince of Orange (1687-1711) at the Moerdijk.

== Genealogical projects ==
In 2007 together with Frans Plooij and Toon van Gestel he initiated the first large-scale genetic genealogy project in the Netherlands, the Project Genetische Genealogie in Nederland. The genetic research for this project was done by Prof. Peter de Knijff, Leiden University, and Dr. Jos Herbergs, TMFI Maastricht. Over the years the project had 1,500 participants. The project focussed on the Y-chromosomal DNA and at that time was unique as it combined genetic profiles with pedigree lines going back centuries. The first combined DNA-results and genealogies were published in Zonen van Adam in Nederland in 2008.

The publication of the book Honderd Schiedamse Families in 2010 led to an accompanying exhibition: Rijkdom van de stad. The exhibition inspired the foundation of a museum for family history. After purchasing an old monastery in Eijsden, Limburg, Barjesteh in 2013 founded the International Museum for Family History in the Ursulinenconvent.
