= Hamid Mirza =

Iranian prince (1918–1988)

Hamid Mirza Qajar
- Sultan
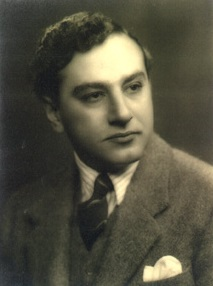

Head of the Qajar dynasty
- Tenure: 1975–1988
- Predecessor: Prince Fereydoun Mirza
- Successor: Prince Mahmoud Mirza
- Born: 23 April 1918; Tabriz, Iran
- Died: 5 May 1988 (aged 70); London, United Kingdom
- Burial: Brookwood Cemetery
- Spouse: Mahin Dokht Malek-Mansur; Soudabeh Afshar
- Issue: Prince Mohammad Hassan Mirza
- Dynasty: Qajar
- Father: Prince Mohammad Hassan Mirza
- Religion: Shia Islam

Prince Sultan Hamid Mirza Qajar (Persian: حمید میرزا قاجار; 23 April 1918 – 5 May 1988) was the head and heir presumptive of the Qajar dynasty, the former ruling dynasty of Iran, and the son of the last Qajar Crown Prince of Iran.

== Biography ==
=== Early life ===
He was born in Tabriz, the son of Crown Prince Mohammad Hassan Mirza and his second wife Mohtaram Razzaghi. His early years were spent at Golestan Palace until he was sent by his father at the age of 4 to be educated in England. On his way to England he visited his grandfather Mohammad Ali Shah Qajar in Constantinople. His grandfather had abdicated in 1909 after the Iranian Constitutional Revolution. He did not go to England as his grandfather felt he was too young to go. Instead he lived with his grandfather: first in Constantinople, and later in San Remo, Italy, where his grandfather died on 5 April 1925. After the death of his grandfather, Hamid Mirza and his older brother Hossein Mirza moved to Paris for a year. When the Qajar dynasty was overthrown in 1925, Hamid Mirza and his brother moved to England with their father. His brother, Hossein, subsequently emigrated to Canada and worked as an architect in Toronto.

In 1934 Hamid Mirza enrolled in the Thames Nautical Training College aboard HMS Worcester in Greenhithe, Kent. He graduated in 1936 with a nautical degree and joined the Royal Mail Steam Packet Company as a cadet. After three years with the Royal Mail, Hamid Mirza left to join Mobil Oil.

=== World War II ===
At the outbreak of World War II, Hamid Mirza tried to join the Royal Navy but was not accepted. He was finally accepted into the Navy in 1942. He served as a sub-lieutenant on HMS Duke of York and HMS Wild Goose. Foreign Secretary Anthony Eden asked him to adopt a British name for his service, due to possible political or diplomatic complications. He used the name "David Drummond" during his naval service. The name was chosen in part after David, the son of his friend Richard Thesiger, and in part after the "Bulldog Drummond" character. Hamid Mirza states that the name simply came out of a telephone book.

During the war there were discussions between the British government and Hamid Mirza and his father about the possible restoration of the Qajar dynasty, since Reza Shah had been deposed. Hamid Mirza and his father were both candidates for the throne. But Hamid Mirza was not seriously considered, as having lived in England since the age of six, he did not speak Persian.

=== Post war ===
After the war Hamid Mirza returned to Mobil Oil. In 1957, he returned to Iran for the first time since he had left as a four-year-old, taking up a position in Tehran. During his time in Iran, he was arrested on two occasions by SAVAK. He left Iran in 1971 to return to London.

He became head and the Heir Presumptive of the Qajar dynasty on the death of his cousin Fereydoun Mirza on 24 September 1975. Upon his death on 5 May 1988 in London, his son Mohammad Hassan Mirza II became the Heir Presumptive of the Qajar dynasty while his uncle, Mahmoud Mirza became the new head of the dynasty.

== Family ==
He married twice. In 1946, he married Mahin Dokht Malek-Mansur (born in 1924), in Paris. They had two children:

- Prince Mohammad Hassan Mirza II (born on 18 July 1949).
- Princess Nasrine Dokht Khanum (born on 8 February 1951).

They were divorced in 1957. On 25 August 1960, he married Soudabeh Afshar (born in 1924) in Tehran. This marriage was childless.

== Notes ==
Hamid Mirza Qajar dynasty Born: 23 April 1918 Died: 5 May 1988
Regnal titles
Preceded by Fereydoun Mirza	Head of the Imperial House of Qajar	Succeeded by Mahmoud Mirza
Titles in pretence
Preceded by Fereydoun Mirza	— TITULAR — Shah of Iran; Qajar dynasty 1975–1988; Reason for succession failure: Pahlavi dynasty became ruling house prior to the Iranian Revolution	Succeeded by Mohammad Hassan Mirza II
