= Musavat (newspaper) =

Weekly newspaper in Qajar Iran (1906–1908)

- Type: Weekly newspaper
- Founder(s): Sayyid Muhammad Riza Shirazi
- Founded: 3 October 1907
- Language: Persian
- Ceased publication: 1909
- Headquarters: Tabriz
- Country: Iran

Musavat (Mosāwāt; Persian: Equality) was a weekly newspaper being one of the publications that were started following the Iranian constitutional revolution. It is known for being the most radical title and was one of the most successful publications of this period. The paper headquartered in Tabriz and existed between 1907 and 1909.

== History and profile ==
Musavat was first published on 3 October 1907. Its founder and editor was Sayyid Muhammad Riza Shirazi who was a member of the secret organization, Revolutionary Committee, established to encourage the constitutional rule in Iran.

Musavat was based in Tabriz and had also offices in Tehran. It was published on a weekly basis. The paper was a supporter of the constitutionalism and argued that the constitutional rule would bring freedom to the country. It frequently attacked the Qajar ruler Mohammad Ali Shah. It was extremely popular among the poor people and women due to its focus on the needs of these groups.

Musavat sold nearly 3,000 copies. The paper ceased publication in 1909, and Sayyid Muhammad Riza Musavat went into exile following the end of the constitutional regime.
