= Mohammad Ali Shah Qajar =

Shah of Iran from 1907 to 1909

- Portrait of Mohammad Ali Shah, c. 1907

Shah of Iran
- Reign: 3 January 1907 – 16 July 1909
- Predecessor: Mozaffar ad-Din Shah Qajar
- Successor: Ahmad Shah Qajar
- Prime Ministers: See list: Mirza Nasrullah Khan; Ali-Asghar Khan Atabak; Ahmad Moshir al-Saltaneh; Abolqasem Naser al-Molk; Nezam al-Saltaneh Mafi; Ahmad Moshir al-Saltaneh; Kamran Mirza; Javad Sa'd al-Dowleh
- Born: 21 June 1872; Tabriz, Qajar Iran
- Died: 5 April 1925 (aged 52); San Remo, Kingdom of Italy
- Burial: Imam Hussein Shrine
- Spouse: Malekeh Jahan
- Issue: See below
Names
- Mohmmad Ali Shah
- Dynasty: Qajar
- Father: Mozaffar ad-Din Shah Qajar
- Mother: Taj ol-Molouk (Umm al-Khakan)
- Religion: Shia Islam
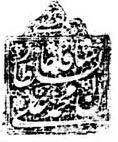
- Tughra

Mohammad Ali Shah Qajar (Persian: محمدعلی شاه قاجار; 21 June 1872 – 5 April 1925) was the sixth shah of the Qajar dynasty and remained the Shah of Iran from 3 January 1907 until being deposed on 16 July 1909. He was furthermore the grandson of Iran’s early moderniser Amir Kabir, through the maternal side.

== Biography ==
Mohammad Ali Shah Qajar was opposed to the Persian Constitution of 1906, which had been ratified during the reign of his father, Mozaffar ad-Din Shah Qajar. Therefore, he was frequently criticized by the publications of the period, including a weekly newspaper Musavat. In 1907, Mohammad Ali dissolved the National Consultative Assembly and declared the Constitution abolished because it was contrary to Islamic law. He bombarded the Majles (Iranian parliament) with the military and political support of Russia and Britain.

In July 1909, pro-Constitution forces marched from Iran's provinces to Tehran led by Sardar As'ad, Sepehdar A'zam, Sattar Khan, Bagher Khan and Yeprem Khan, deposed the Shah, and re-established the constitution. On 16 July 1909, the parliament voted to place Mohammad Ali Shah's 11-year-old son, Ahmad Shah on the throne. Mohammad Ali Shah abdicated following the new Constitutional Revolution and he has since been remembered as a symbol of dictatorship.

Having fled to Odesa, Russia (currently Ukraine), Mohammad Ali plotted his return to power. In 1911 he landed at Astarabad, Iran, but his forces were defeated. Mohammad Ali Shah returned to Russia, then in 1920 to Constantinople (present-day Istanbul) and later to San Remo, Italy, where he died on 5 April 1925. He was buried at the Shrine of Imam Husain in Karbala, Iraq. Every Shah of Iran since Mohammad Ali has died in exile.

His son and successor, Ahmad Shah Qajar was the last sovereign of the Qajar dynasty.

== Honours ==
- Austria-Hungary: Grand Cross of the Order of Leopold (1900)
- French Third Republic: Grand Cross of the Legion of Honour (1907)
- Ottoman Empire: Exalted Order of the House of Osman (1905)
- Russian Empire:
  - Knight of the Order of St. Andrew (1905)
  - Knight of the Order of St. Alexander Nevsky (1905)
  - Knight of the Order of the White Eagle (1905)
  - Knight of the Order of Saint Stanislaus, 1st Class (1905)
  - Knight of the Order of St. Anna, 1st Class (1905)

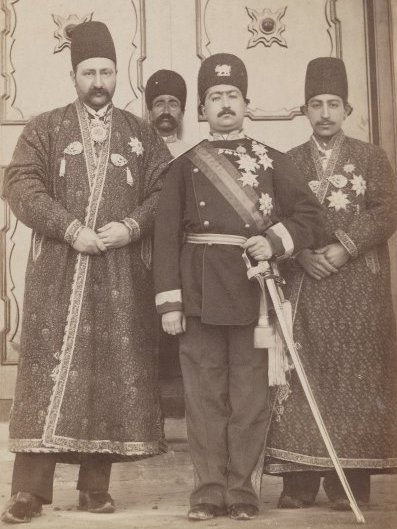
Mohammad Ali Shah Qajar with Mirza Mohammad Ebrahim Khan, the Mo'avin al-Dowleh, and Company, c. 1907

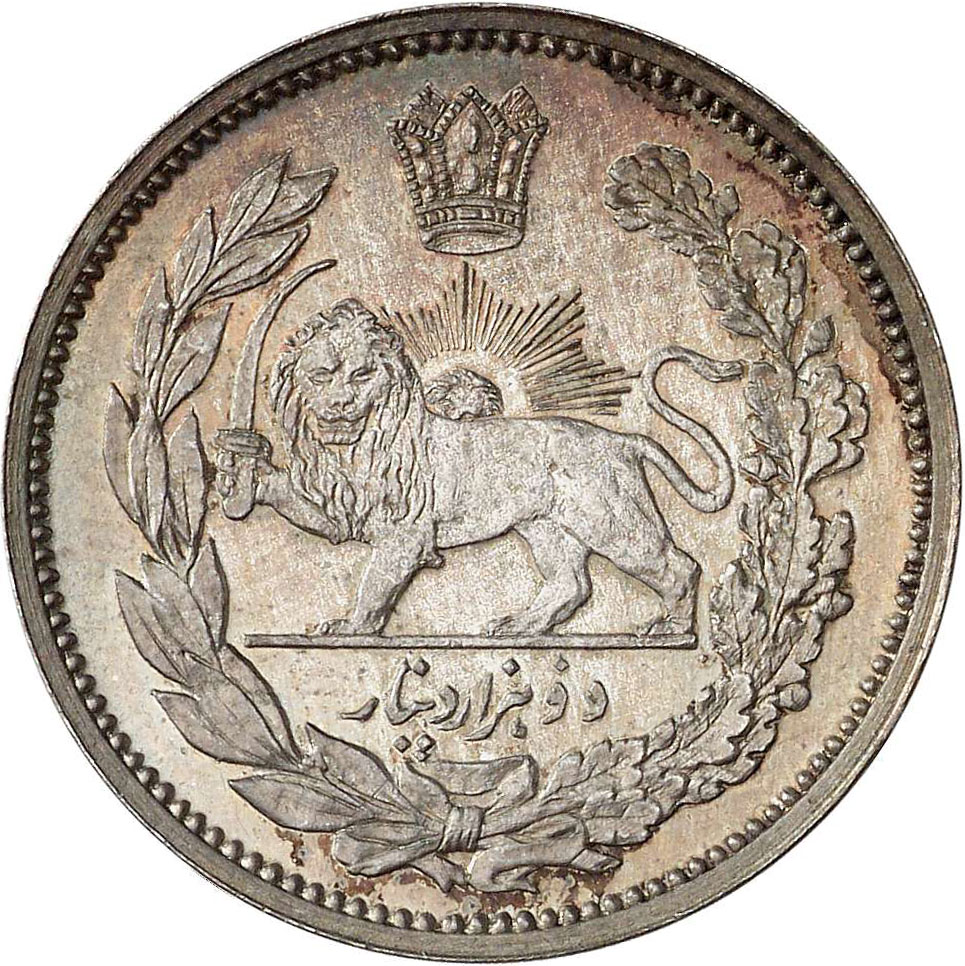
A 2000 Dinar/2 Qiran coin of Mohammad Ali Shah Qajar era

== Family ==
=== Wives ===
Mohammad Ali Shah had two wives:

1. Robabeh Khanum "Malih-os-Saltaneh"
2. Princess Zahra Qajar "Malekeh Jahan", daughter of Kamran Mirza "Nayeb-os-Saltaneh"

=== Children ===
Mohammad Ali Shah had six sons and two daughters:

Sons

1. Hossein Ali Mirza "E'tezad Saltaneh"
2. Gholam Hossein Mirza (died in infancy)
3. Soltan Ahmad Mirza (later Ahmad Shah Qajar)
4. Mohammad Hassan Mirza
5. Sultan Mahmoud Mirza
6. Sultan Majid Mirza

Daughters

1. Khadijeh Khanum "Hazrat-e Ghodsieh"
2. Assieh Khanum

== List of prime ministers ==
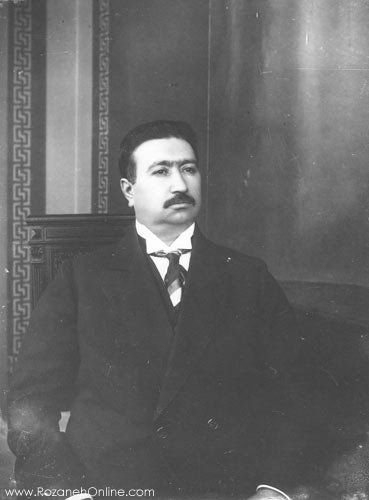
Mohammad Ali Shah Qajar after deposal, c. 1912–1915

- Mirza Nasrollah Khan Moshir od-Dowleh (till 17 March 1907)
- Mirza Ali-Asghar Khan Amin os-Soltan (1 May 1907 – 31 August 1907)
- Mohammad-Vali Khan Tonekaboni (1st Term) (13 September 1907 – 21 December 1907)
- Hossein-Qoli Nezam al-Saltaneh Mafi (21 December 1907 – 21 May 1908)
- Morteza-Qoli Khan Hedayat Sani od-Dowleh (21 May 1908 – 7 June 1908)
- Prince Kamran Mirza Nayeb os-Saltaneh (7 June 1908 – 29 April 1909)

== See also ==
- Qajar dynasty
- Qajar family tree
- Attempts at Constitutionalization in Iran
- Persian Constitutional Revolution
- Persian Cossack Brigade
- Anglo-Russian Entente
- 1908 bombardment of the Majlis
- History of the Iranian Constitutional Revolution

Mohammad Ali Shah Qajar Qajar dynasty Born: 21 June 1872 Died: 5 April 1925
Iranian royalty
Preceded by Mozaffar al-Din Shah Qajar	Shah of Persia; 1907–1909	Succeeded by Ahmad Shah Qajar
