= Ahmad Shah Qajar =

Shah of Iran from 1909 to 1925

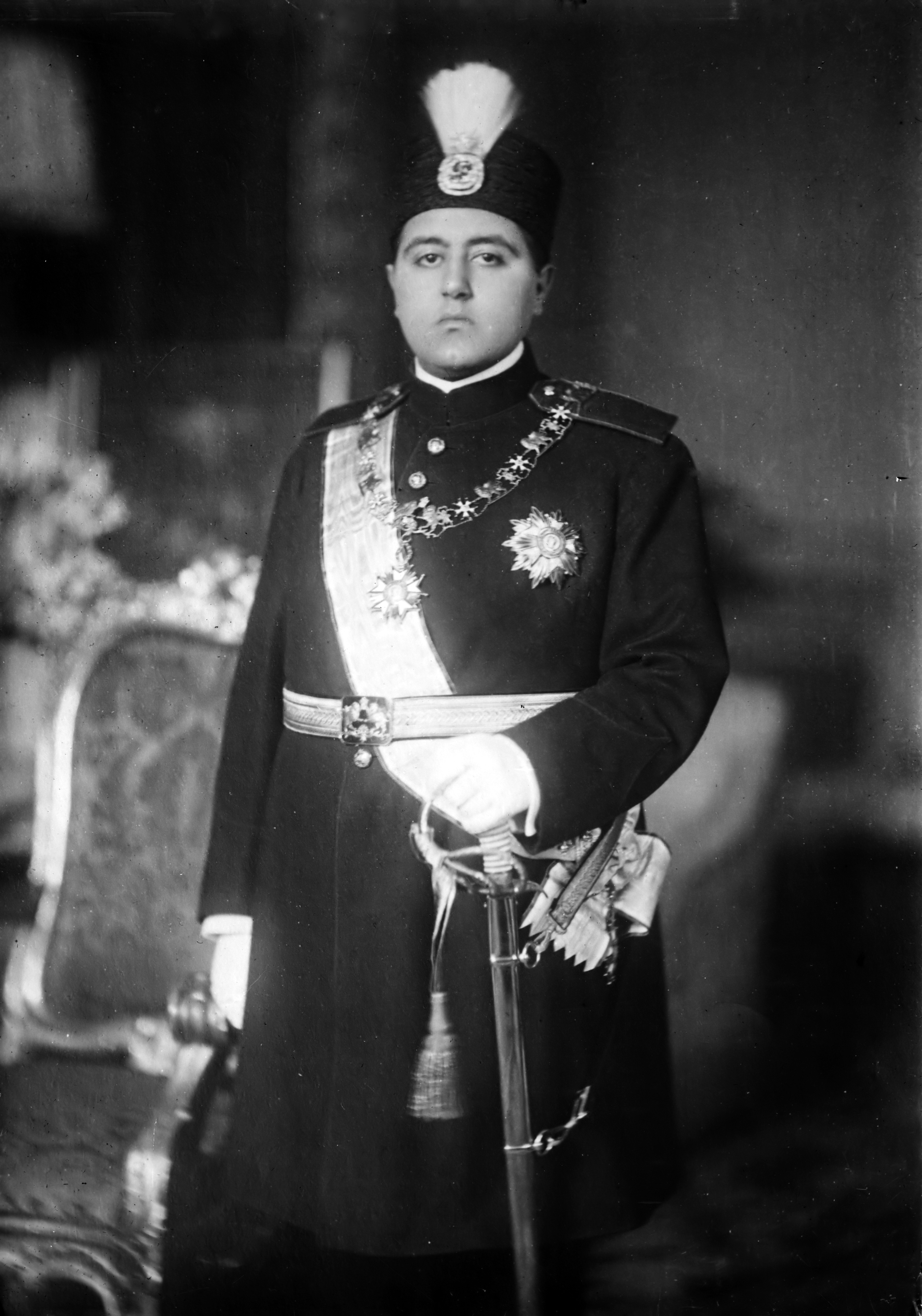
- Ahmad Shah in 1916

Shah of Iran
- Reign: 16 July 1909 – 15 December 1925
- Coronation: 21 July 1914
- Predecessor: Mohammad Ali Shah Qajar
- Successor: Reza Shah Pahlavi
- Regent: Ali Reza Khan Azod al-Molk; Abolqasem Naser ol-Molk
- Prime Ministers: See list: Mohammad Vali Khan Tonekaboni; Mostowfi ol-Mamalek; Najaf-Qoli Khan Bakhtiari; Mohammad-Ali Ala al-Saltaneh; Hassan Pirnia; Abdol Majid Mirza; Vossug ed Dowleh; Fathollah Khan Akbar; Zia'eddin Tabatabaee; Qavām os-Saltaneh; Reza Khan Sardar Sepah
- Born: 21 January 1898; Tabriz, Qajar Iran
- Died: 21 February 1930 (aged 32); Neuilly-sur-Seine, France
- Burial: Imam Husayn Shrine
- Spouse: Badr al-Molouk
- Issue Among others...: Princess Irandokht; Prince Fereydoun Mirza
Names
- Soltan Ahmad Shah Qajar
- Dynasty: Qajar
- Father: Mohammad Ali Shah Qajar
- Mother: Malekeh Jahan
- Religion: Shia Islam
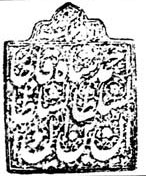
- Tughra

Ahmad Shah Qajar (Persian: احمد شاه قاجار; 21 January 1898 – 21 February 1930) was the Shah of Iran (Persia) from 16 July 1909 to 15 December 1925, and the seventh and final ruling member of the Qajar dynasty.

Ahmad Shah was born in Tabriz on 21 January 1898 and ascended the throne at the age of 11 after the removal of his father Mohammad Ali Shah by the Parliament on 16 July 1909. Due to his young age, his uncle, Ali-Reza Khan, took charge of state affairs as Regent. Upon reaching the age of majority, Ahmad Shah was formally crowned on 21 July 1914.

== Reign ==
On 16 July 1909, Mohammad Ali Shah Qajar was overthrown by rebels seeking to restore the 1906 Constitution. The rebels then convened the Grand Majles of 500 delegates from different backgrounds, which placed Ahmad Shah, Mohammad Ali's eleven-year-old son, on the Sun Throne.

The Grand Majlis enacted many reforms. They abolished class representation and created five new seats in the Majlis for minorities: two seats for Armenians, and one seat each for Jews, Zoroastrians, and Assyrians. The Majles also democratized the electoral system, diminished the electoral dominance of Tehran, and even lowered the voting age from twenty-five to twenty.

Not much is known about Ahmad's early life before his succession to the throne. Due to his young age, his uncle, Ali Reza Khan Azod al-Molk, governed as regent.

Ahmad Shah was formally crowned on 21 July 1914, upon reaching his majority. He attempted to fix the damage done by his father by appointing the best ministers he could find. He was, however, an ineffective ruler who was faced with internal unrest and foreign intrusions, particularly by the British Empire and Russian Empire. Russian and British troops fought against the Ottoman Empire forces in Iran during World War I.

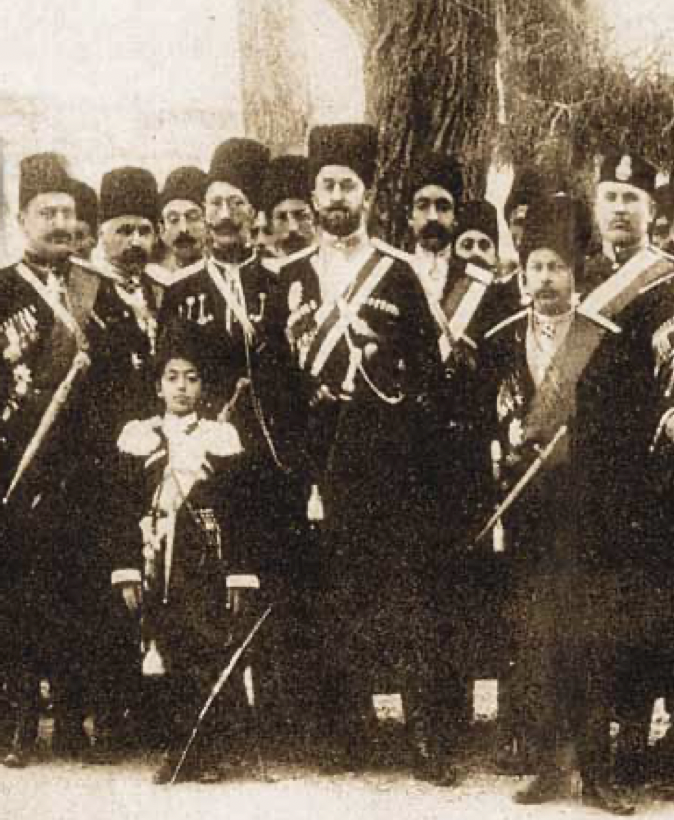
Ahmad Shah Qajar (the youngest, lower left) with General Liakhov (right of the Shah) and Alexander Khan Setkhanian (right of Liakhov), 1911.

The Second Majlis convened in November 1910 and just like the First Majlis, did not lead to any relevant accomplishment. The Majlis was rendered ineffective because the central government was weak and did not have enough influence to rein in the changes that it had proposed.

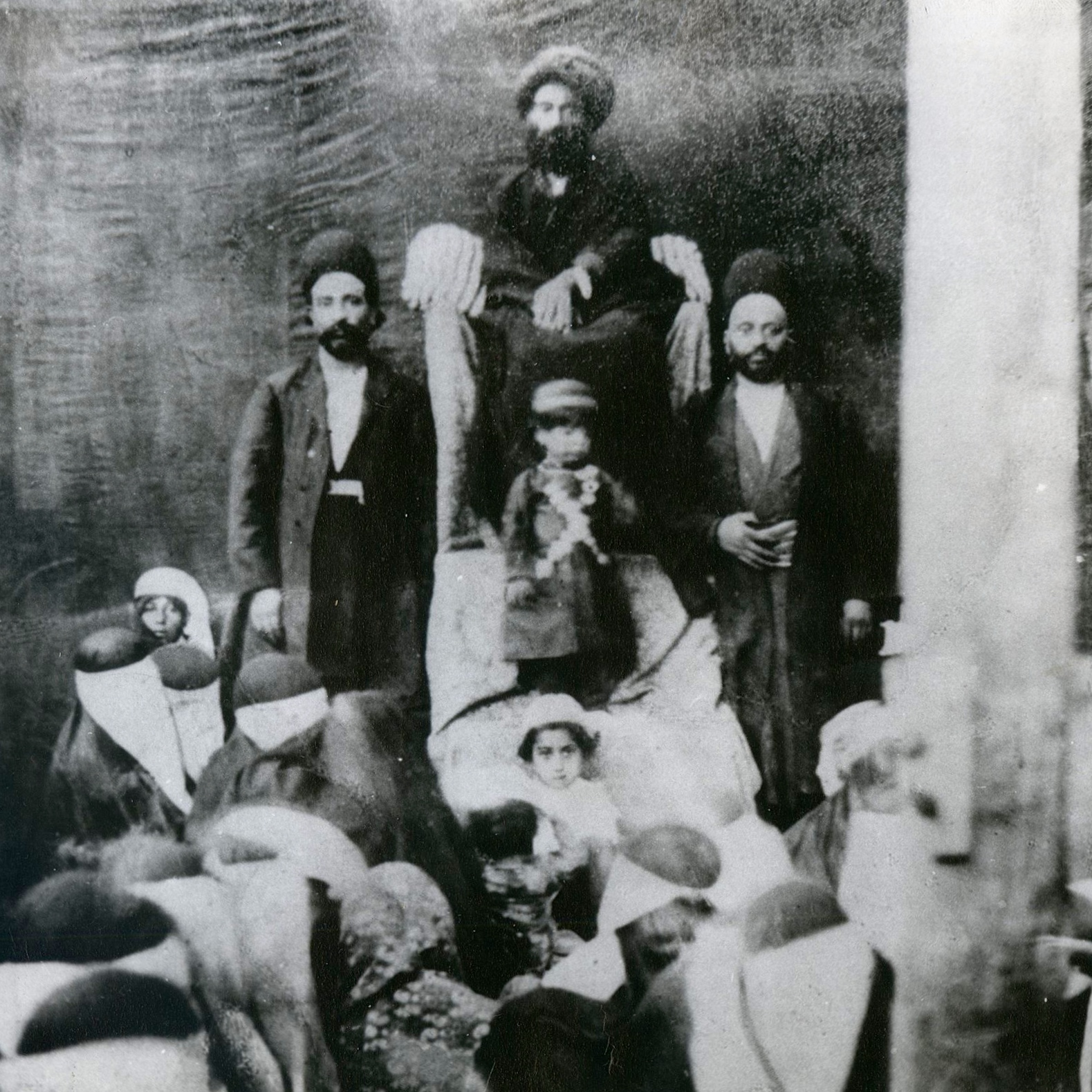
Ahmad Shah (center) as a child, pictured with Haj Seyed Gholamhossein Majd Mojabi (above) and guards in 1901.

In 1917, Britain used Iran as the springboard for an attack into Russia in an unsuccessful attempt to reverse the Russian Revolution of 1917. The newly born Soviet Union responded by annexing portions of northern Persia as buffer states much like its Tsarist predecessor. Marching on Tehran, the Soviets extracted ever more humiliating concessions from the Iranian government – whose ministers Ahmad Shah was often unable to control. The weakness of the government in the face of such aggression by an atheist foreign power sparked seething anger among many traditional Iranians – including the young Ruhollah Khomeini, who would later condemn both Communism and monarchy as treason against Iran's sovereignty and the laws of Islam.

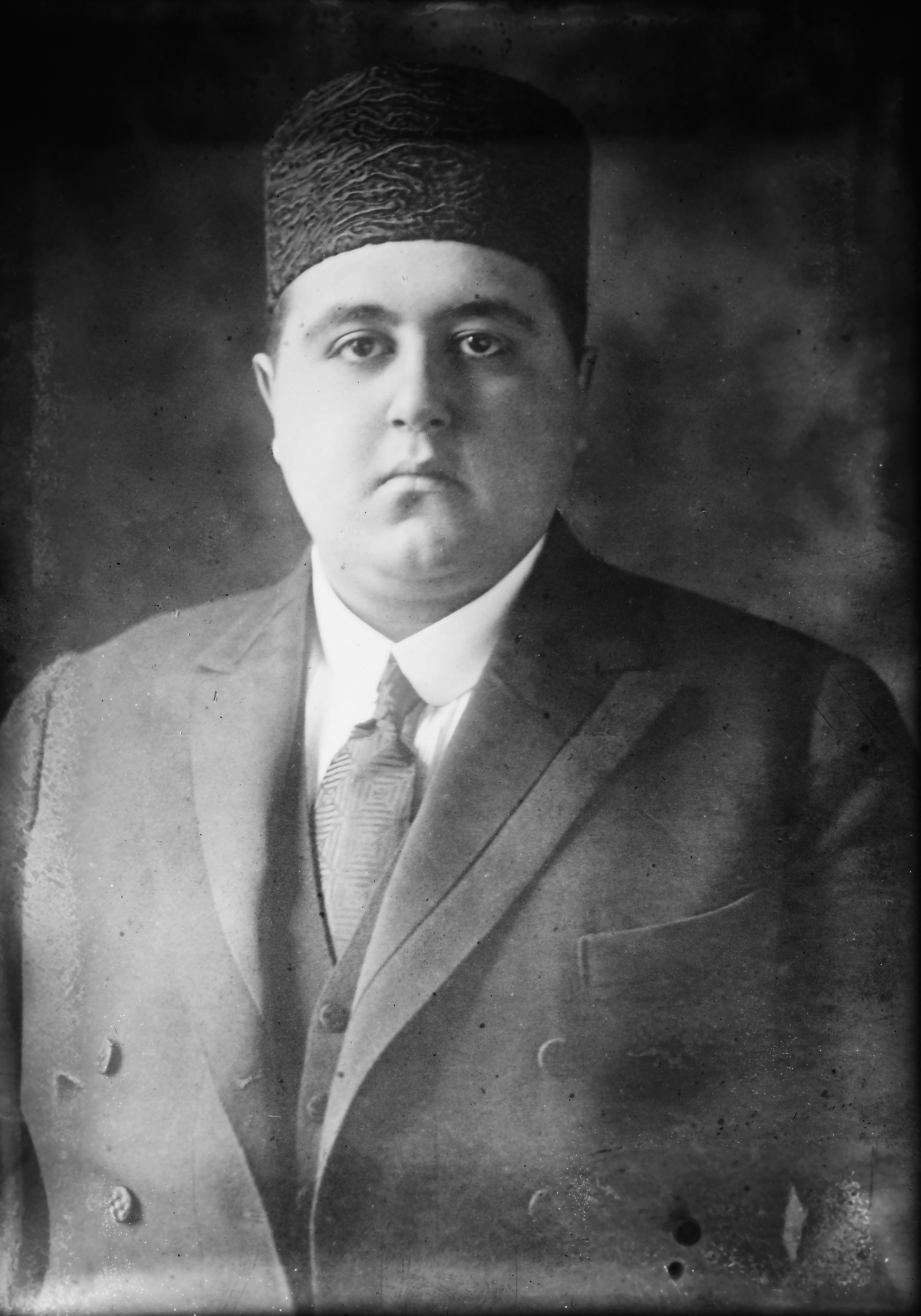
A picture of Ahmad Shah Qajar

By 1920, the government had virtually lost all power outside the capital and Ahmad Shah had lost control of the situation. Ahmad Shah has also been described as "pleasure-loving, effete, and incompetent". The Anglo-Persian Agreement, along with new political parties, further immobilized the country. The Moderates and Democrats often clashed, particularly when it came to minority rights and secularism. The debates between the two political parties led to violence and even assassinations.

The weak economic state of Iran put Ahmad Shah and his government at the mercy of foreign influence; they had to obtain loans from the Imperial Bank of Persia. Furthermore, under the Anglo-Persian Agreement, Iran received only a small fraction of the income generated by the Anglo-Persian Oil Company. On the other hand, the Red Army along with rebels and warlords ruled much of the countryside.

On 21 February 1921, Ahmad Shah was pushed aside in a coup d'état by Colonel Reza Khan, Minister of War and commander of the Persian Cossack Brigade, who subsequently seized the post of Prime Minister. During the coup, Reza Khan used three thousand men and eighteen machine guns, a nearly bloodless coup that moved forward quickly. One of Khan's first actions was to rescind the unpopular Anglo-Persian Agreement. In addition, he signed the Russo-Persian Treaty of Friendship. This agreement canceled all previous treaties between the two countries and also gave Persia full and equal shipping rights in the Caspian Sea.

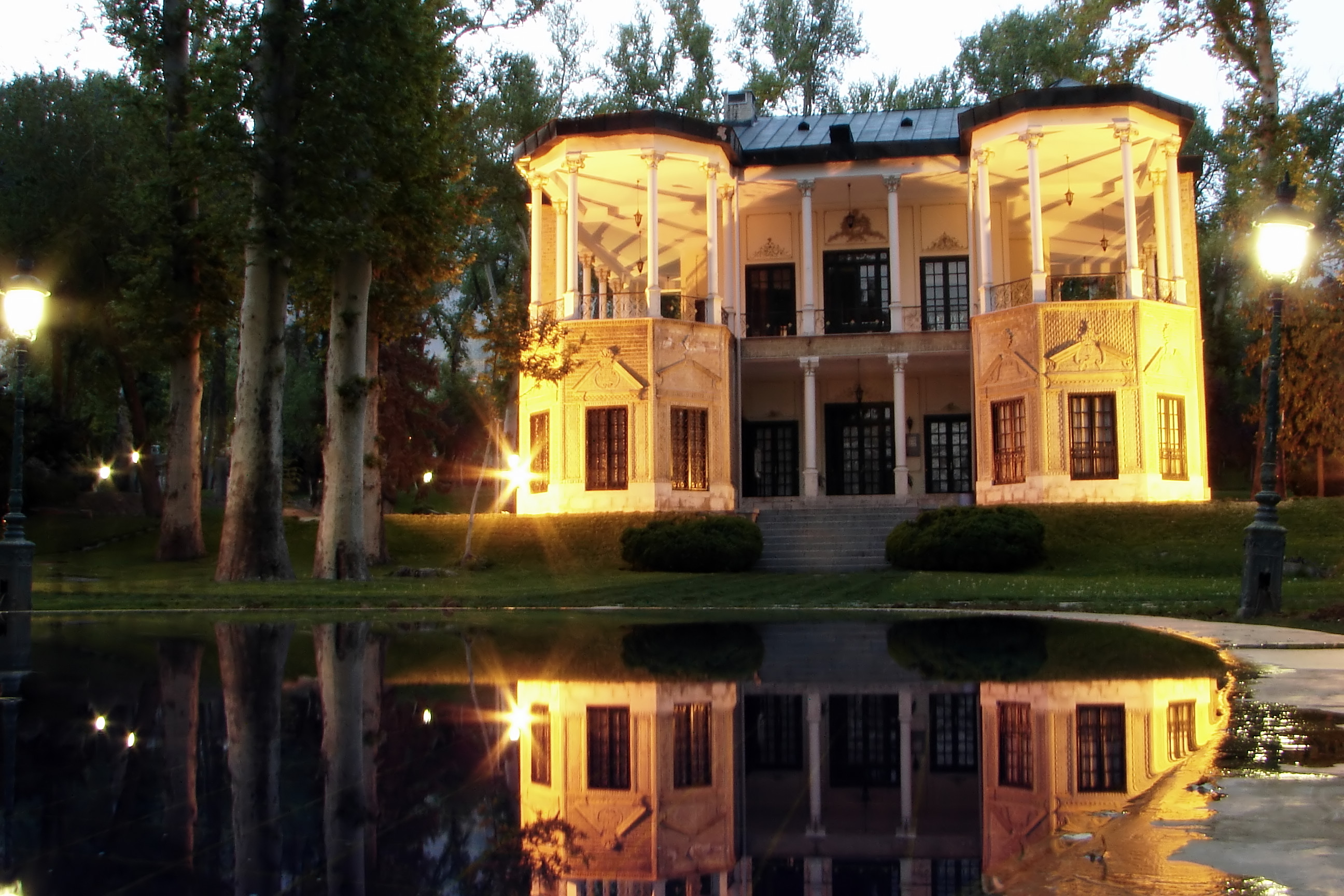
Ahmad Shahi Pavilion was built at the end of the Qajar era as Ahmad Shah's dwelling in Niavaran garden.

Stripped of all his remaining powers, Ahmad Shah went into exile with his family in 1923. Ahmad Shah's apparent lack of interest in attending to the affairs of the state and poor health had prompted him to leave Iran on an extended trip to Europe. He was formally deposed on 31 October 1925, when Reza Khan was proclaimed Shah by the Majlis, as Reza Shah Pahlavi. This terminated the Qajar dynasty.

== Exile and death ==
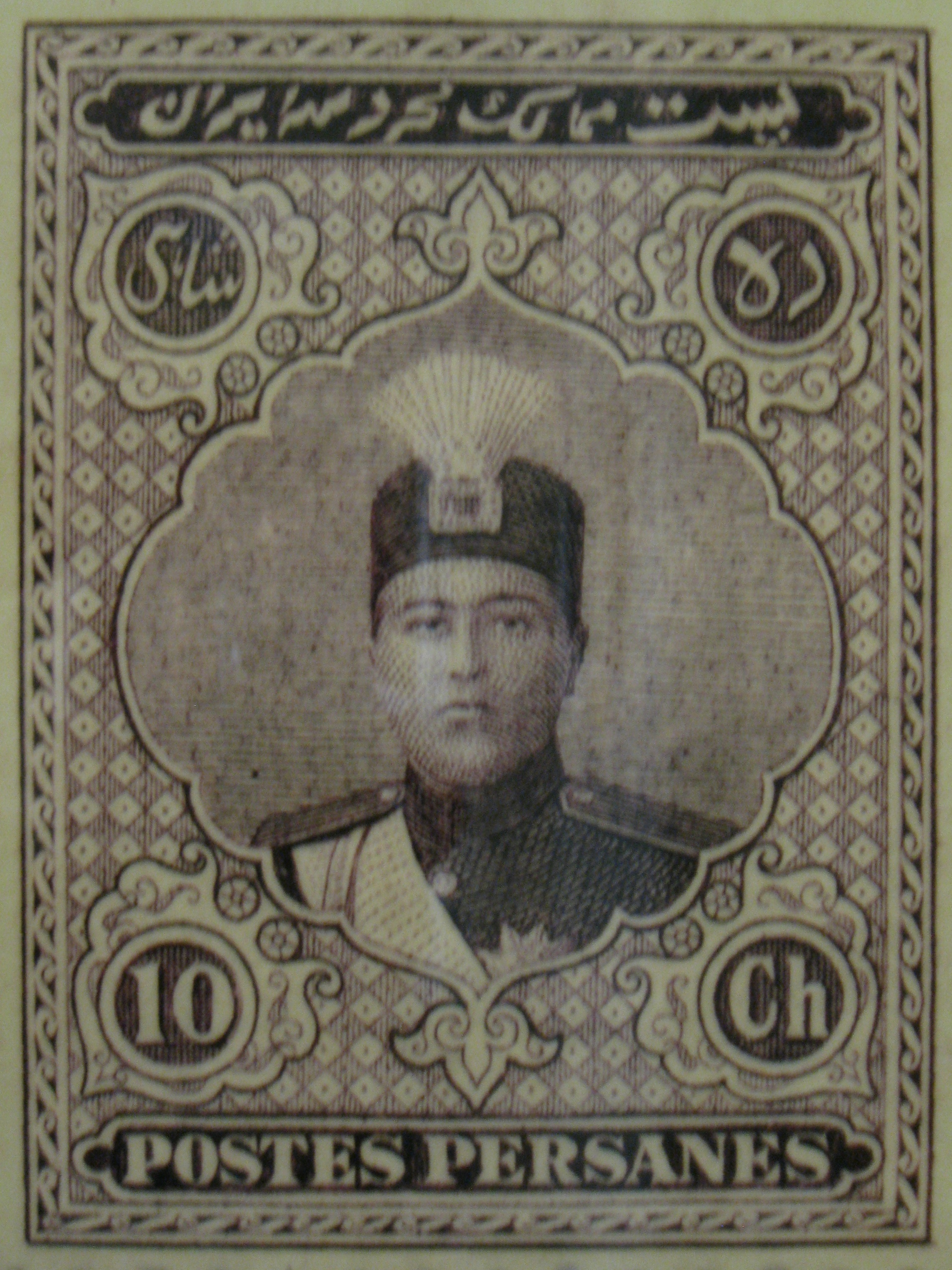
Ahmad Shah Qajar on stamp 10 shahis.

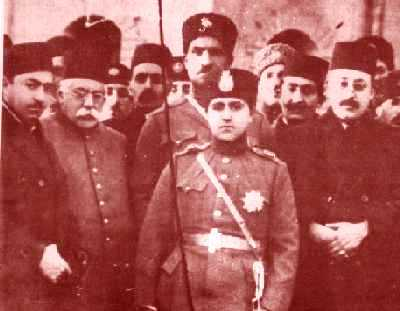
Reza Khan (later Reza Shah Pahlavi) behind Ahmad Shah with the prominent prince Abdol-Hossein Farmanfarma.

The coup of 1921 rendered Ahmad Shah politically weaker and less relevant. In 1923, Ahmad Shah left Iran for Europe for health reasons. Later, the formal termination of the Qajar dynasty by the Majles turned Ahmad Shah's 1923 European tour into exile.

Ahmad Shah died in 1930 of influenza (the Spanish Flu) at the American Hospital of Paris, and under his will, he was buried in his family crypt in Karbala, Iraq. His brother, former crown prince Mohammad Hassan Mirza, assured the continuation of the dynasty through his descendants. French publications at the time reported that his estate was worth some seventy-five million francs.

== Family ==
Ahmad Shah Qajar married five times. His first wife was Lydia Jahanbani. He had four children, each by a different wife.

- Princess Maryamdokht (1915 – November 10, 2005), daughter of Delaram Khanum
- Princess Irandokht (1916–1984), daughter of Princess Badr al-Molouk Vala
- Princess Homayoundokht (1917–2011), daughter of Princess Khanum Khanumha Moezzi
- Prince Fereydoun Mirza (1922 – September 24, 1975), son of Fatemeh Khanum

He had 12 grandchildren, who respectively carry the last names Albertini, Faroughy, Panahi and Qajar (also spelled Kadjar).

== List of prime ministers ==
- Mohammad-Vali Khan Tonekaboni Sepahdar A'zam (2nd Term) (29 April 1909 – 3 May 1909)
- Najafqoli Khan Bakhtiari Saad od-Dowleh (1st Term) (3 May 1909 – 16 July 1909)
- Mohammad-Vali Khan Tonekaboni Sepahdar A'zam (3rd Term) (16 July 1909 – 6 October 1909)
- Hassan Vossug ed Dowleh (1st Term) (6 October 1909 – 15 July 1910)
- Mirza Hassan Khan Ashtiani Mostowfi ol-Mamalek (1st Term) (15 July 1910 – 19 July 1911)
- Hassan Vossug ed Dowleh (2nd Term) (19 July 1911 – 26 July 1911)
- Mohammad-Vali Khan Tonekaboni Sepahdar A'zam (4th Term) (26 July 1911 – 23 December 1912)
- Najafqoli Khan Bakhtiari Saad od-Dowleh (2nd Term) (23 December 1912 – 11 January 1913)
- Mirza Mohammad-Ali Khan (11 January 1913 – 1 July 1914)
- Mirza Hassan Khan Ashtiani Mostowfi ol-Mamalek (2nd Term) (1 July 1914 – 1 February 1915)
- Prince Abdol-Hossein Mirza Farmanfarma (1st Term) (1 February 1915 – 2 July 1915)
- Prince Abdol-Majid Mirza Eyn od-Dowleh (1st Term) (2 July 1915 – 18 August 1915)
- Mirza Hassan Khan Ashtiani Mostowfi ol-Mamalek (3rd Term) (18 August 1915 – 25 December 1915)
- Prince Abdol-Hossein Mirza Farmanfarma (2nd Term) (25 December 1915 – 1 March 1916)
- Hassan Vossug ed Dowleh (3rd Term) (1 March 1916 – 7 July 1917)
- Mirza Hassan Khan Ashtiani Mostowfi ol-Mamalek (4th Term) (7 July 1917 – 19 December 1917)
- Prince Abdol-Majid Mirza Eyn od-Dowleh (2nd Term) (28 December 1917 – 20 May 1918)
- Hassan Khan Moshir od-Dowleh Pirnia (1st Term) (20 May 1918 – 2 August 1918)
- Samad Khan Momtaz os-Saltaneh (2 August 1918 – 20 August 1918)
- Hassan Khan Moshir od-Dowleh Pirnia (2nd Term) (20 August 1918 – 16 October 1920)
- Fathollah Khan Akbar Sepahdar Rashti (16 October 1920 – 21 February 1921)
- Zia'eddin Tabatabaee (21 February 1921 – 4 June 1921)
- Ahmad Qavam os-Saltaneh (1st Term) (4 June 1921 – 12 October 1921)
- Prince Malek Mansur Mirza Shoa os-Saltaneh (12 October 1921 – 20 January 1922)
- Hassan Khan Moshir od-Dowleh Pirnia (3rd Term) (20 January 1922 – 11 June 1922)
- Ahmad Qavam (2nd Term) (11 June 1922 – 30 January 1923)
- Mirza Hassan Khan Ashtiani Mostowfi ol-Mamalek (5th Term) (30 January 1923 – 15 June 1923)
- Hassan Khan Moshir od-Dowleh Pirnia (4th Term) (15 June 1923 – 28 October 1923)
- General Reza Khan Sardar-Sepah (28 October 1923 – 1 November 1925)

== Honours ==
=== Iran ===
- He was Grand Master of the following orders:
  - Order of Zulfiqar
  - Order of the August Portrait
  - Most Sacred Order of the Aqdas
  - Order of the Lion and the Sun

=== Foreign ===
- Belgium: Grand Cordon of the Order of Leopold (1914)
- Kingdom of Egypt: Collar of the Order of Muhammad Ali (1919)
- French Third Republic: Grand Cross of the Legion of Honour (1914)
- Kingdom of Italy: Knight of the Supreme Order of the Most Holy Annunciation (14 February 1920)
- Monaco: Grand Cross of the Order of Saint-Charles (14 January 1915)
- Ottoman Empire: Order of Osmanieh, 1st Class (1914)
- Russian Empire:
  - Knight of the Order of St. Andrew
  - Knight of the Order of St. Alexander Nevsky
  - Knight of the Order of the White Eagle (Russia)
  - Knight of the Order of Saint Stanislaus, 1st Class
  - Knight of the Order of St. Anna, 1st Class
- Spain: Grand Cross of the Order of Charles III, with Collar (1914)

== See also ==
- 1905 Persian Constitutional Revolution
- 1909 Persian legislative election
- 1914 Persian legislative election
- 1919 Anglo-Persian Agreement
- 1921 Persian coup d'etat
- 1921 Russo-Persian Treaty of Friendship
- Ahmad Shahi Pavilion
- Anglo-Russian Entente
- Pahlavi dynasty
- Jungle Movement of Gilan
- Persian Campaign
- Persian Cossack Brigade
- Persian Central Government Gendarmerie
- Qajar family tree
- Simko Shikak revolt
- South Persia Rifles
- Soviet Republic of Gilan
- Reza Shah Pahlavi

Ahmad Shah Qajar Qajar dynasty Born: 21 January 1898 Died: 21 February 1930
Iranian royalty
Preceded by Mohammad Ali Shah Qajar	Shah of Iran; 1909–1925	Succeeded by Reza Shah Pahlavi
Regnal titles
Preceded by Mohammad Ali Shah Qajar	Head of the Imperial House of Qajar; 1909–1930	Succeeded by Fereydoun Mirza Qajar (de facto); Mohammad Hassan Mirza (de jure)
