= Mohammad Hassan Mirza =

Last Qajar Crown prince (1899–1943)

- Hazrat-e Aghdas
- Regent of Iran: 24 March 1924 – 31 October 1925
- Born: 20 November 1899; Tabriz, Azerbaijan, Sublime State of Persia
- Died: 7 January 1943 (aged 43); Maidenhead, Berkshire, England
- Burial: Imam Husayn Shrine
- Spouse: Mahin Banou Malek-Mansour; Muhtaram-os-Saltaneh; Homayoun-os-Saltaneh princess Shams-ol-Molouk; Aziz Aghdas
- Issue: Princess Shirin; Prince Soltan Hossein Mirza; Prince Soltan Hamid Mirza; Prince Rokn al-Din Mirza; Princess Shams Aqdas; Princess Giti Afrouz
- Dynasty: Qajar
- Father: Mohammad Ali Shah
- Mother: Malakeh Jahan
- Religion: Shia Islam

Mohammad Hassan Mirza (Persian: محمدحسن میرزا; 20 November 1899 – 7 January 1943), titled Hazrat-e Aghdas (Persian: حضرت اقدس), was the last crown prince of the Qajar dynasty, who served as the Regent of Iran from 1924 until 1925, after his brother, Ahmad Shah Qajar, permanently departed from Iran in late 1923. In 1924, he successfully halted Reza Khan's attempt to declare Iran a republic, unifying a parliamentary alliance against the legislative votes required to change Iran's constitution from a monarchy to a republic. The following year, Reza Shah deposed the Qajar dynasty and installed himself as Shah of Iran in 1925, Mohammad Hassan and his family were sent into permanent exile to England.

In 1930, he declared himself the rightful heir to the crown as pretender to the throne. He died on 7 January 1943 in Maidenhead, England and was buried in Karbala, Iraq.

== Tension with Ahmad Shah Qajar ==
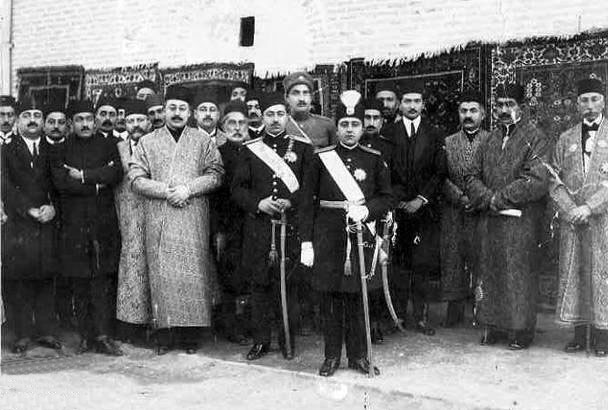
Photograph of Mohammad Hassan Mirza, Ahmad Shah Qajar and Reza Khan Pahlavi

Even before the dethronement of his brother Ahmad Shah Qajar by Reza Shah, he was still an inconsequential figure in Iranian politics. This was not from a lack of trying however; in early March 1921, Mohammad Hassan Mirza approached the British legation with proposals to supplant his brother, the shah of Iran at the time. The High Commissioner's office in Baghdad informed Herman Norman in a telegram that Zia'eddin Tabatabaee informed them that Mohammad Hassan Mirza was "very dissatisfied with the shah and fears for safety of Persia from the Bolsheviks...", and that "he [Mohammad Hassan Mirza] is prepared to form new government as he considers the Shah useless...". Mohammad Hassan Mirza's proposals were ignored, except by Percy Cox who was the former attache of Britain in Iran. Herman Norman who was current British diplomat to Iran thought of the dethronement of Ahmad Shah by his brother as a tactical mistake which would divide Iran; "[I am prevented] from encouraging any movement which has for its object dethronement of His Majesty. It is also my duty to do my best to preserve the unity of Persia".

== Honours ==
=== National ===
- Qajar Iran:
  - Member 1st Class of the Order of the Lion and the Sun
  - Member 1st Class of the Order of the Crown of Persia

=== Foreign ===
- Sultanate of Egypt: Grand Cordon of the Order of Muhammad Ali (1921)
- Kingdom of Italy: Knight of the Supreme Order of the Most Holy Annunciation (29 March 1925)
- Monaco: Grand Cross of the Order of Saint-Charles (14 January 1915)

== Offspring ==
- Prince Soltan Hosein Mirza (25 August 1916, Tabriz-1986, Canada)
- Prince Soltan Hamid Mirza (23 April 1918, Tabriz-5 May 1988, London)
- Prince Rokn al-Din Mirza (1923, Tehran-1996, Canada)
- Princess Shmas Aghdas (1919, Tehran-1991, Paris)
- Princess Giti Afruz (1922, Tehran-2022, New York City)

== Government positions held ==
- Governor-General of Azerbaijan (1918)

Mohammad Hassan Mirza House of Qâjâr Born: 20 November 1899 Died: 7 January 1943
Iranian royalty
Preceded by Ahmad Mirza	Crown Prince of Persia; 1909–1925	Vacant Pahlavi dynasty became ruling house Title next held by Mohammad Reza Pahlavi
Titles in pretence
Preceded by Ahmad Shah Qajar	— TITULAR — Shah of Iran; Qajar dynasty 1930–1943; Reason for succession failure: Pahlavi dynasty became ruling house prior to the Iranian Revolution	Succeeded by Fereydoun Mirza Qajar
Non-profit organization positions
New title Society founded	Honorary Director of the Red Lion and Sun Society; 1922–1925	Vacant Title next held by Mostowfi ol-Mamalek
