= Yeprem Khan =

Armenian revolutionary (1868–1912)

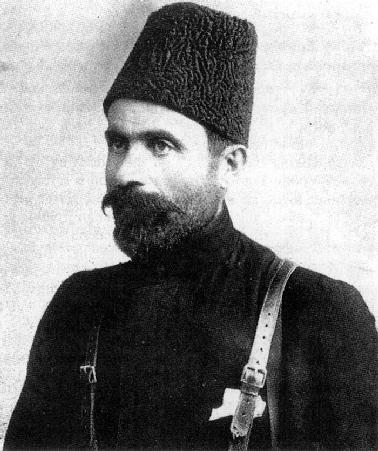
- Born: Yeprem Davitian; 1868; Barsum, Elisabethpol Governorate, Russian Empire
- Died: 18 May 1912 (aged 43–44); Shurcheh, Kermanshah, Iran
- Burial place: Holy Mother of God Church, Tehran
- Military career
- Allegiance: Dashnaktsutyun; Qajar Iran
- Service years: 1896–1912
- Nickname: Khan
- Military career
- Conflicts: Armenian national liberation movement; Persian Constitutional Revolution; Siege of Tabriz (1908–1909); Battle of Rasht; Triumph of Tehran; Revolt of Salar od–Dowleh; Battle of Varamin; Battle of Qazvin (1909); Aftermath of the persian constitutional revolution; battle near Shurcheh †

Yeprem Khan (Armenian: Եփրեմ Խան; 1868–1912), born Yeprem Davitian (Armenian: Եփրեմ Դաւիթեան, Persian: یپرم‌خان داویدیان), was an Iranian-Armenian member of the Armenian Revolutionary Federation (ARF), revolutionary leader and a leading figure in the Constitutional Revolution of Iran.

He is considered a national hero in Iran.

== Life ==
=== Early life ===
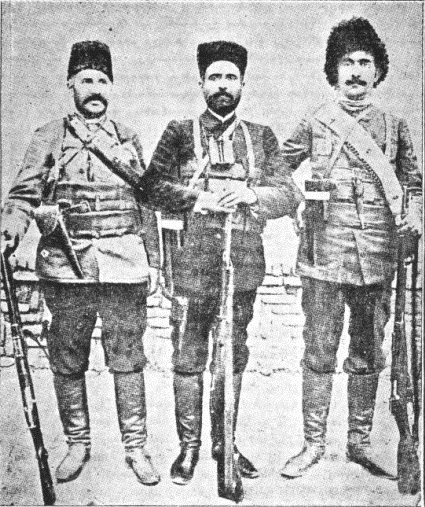
From left to right: Keri, Yeprem Khan, and Khetcho

Yeprem Khan was born to an Armenian family in the village of Barsum (Armenian: Բարսում), located in Elisabethpol Governorate of the Russian Empire (located in present-day Azerbaijan).

In his youth, Yeprem participated in Armenian nationalist groups as well as in partisan activities against the Ottoman Empire. In September 1890, Yeprem was arrested by the Russian Cossacks. He was exiled to Siberia by 1892, from where he managed to escape to Tabriz in 1896. While in Tabriz, he began working for the Armenian Revolutionary Federation (ARF Dashnaktsutyun), whose activity in Persia was primarily directed against the Ottoman Empire, and established its local branches in Tabriz, Urmia and Rasht.

=== Revolutionary ===
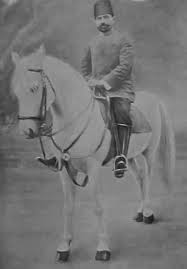
Yeprem Khan on his horse

Yeprem was highly instrumental in the Iranian Constitutional Revolution, and, by 1907, convinced ARF to actively participate in it. After the Persian national parliament was shelled by the Russian Colonel Vladimir Liakhov, Yeprem Khan united with Sattar Khan and other revolutionary leaders in the Constitutional Revolution of Iran against Mohammad Ali Shah Qajar.

In October 1908, during Tabriz resistance, Yeprem Khan formed a secret Sattar Committee (in honor of Sattar Khan) in Rasht, and established contacts with Social Democrats, Social Revolutionaries, and the ARF in the Caucasus. Reinforced by 35 Georgians and twenty Armenians from Baku, Yeprem captured Rasht and then planted his red flag on the town hall of Anzali. Further reinforced by Mohammad Vali Sepahdar, the main landed magnate of the Caspian provinces and former Qajar commander, Yeprem Khan marched his forces of Caucasian guerillas and Mazandarani peasants towards Tehran, which he entered in July 1909. After the capture of Tehran, Mohammad Ali Shah Qajar fled from his palace to the Russian Embassy. On the same day, the Iranian Parliament set in an extraordinary meeting to replace Mohammad Ali Shah Qajar in favor of his son Ahmad Shah Qajar. On 10 September 1909, Mohammad Ali Shah Qajar left the Russian Embassy and went into exile in Odessa in Russia (today part of Ukraine).

=== Police chief in Iran ===
On 30 July 1909, the Second National Assembly (Parliament) of Iran, appointed Yeprem Khan as the police chief of Tehran. After becoming the police chief of Tehran, he restored order in the city and made various reforms to the police force. In 1910, he became chief police of all Iran. He further split from revolutionaries, when in 1910, Sattar Khan, a hero of the civil war, refused to obey the government order to disarm. After a brief but violent confrontation at Atabek Park in Tehran, Yeprem Khan, using Shah's army and police forces, disarmed Sattar Khan. In 1911 Mohammad Ali Shah Qajar plotted his return to power from Odessa. He later landed at Astarabad, Iran, but his forces were defeated by Yeprem. Mohammad Ali Shah then fled to Russia, then in 1920 to Constantinople and later to San Remo, Italy, where he died five years later in April 1925 (he was buried in Karbala, Iraq).

Yeprem Khan was killed on 19 May 1912 while he was trying to rescue one of his comrades in a battle in Shurcheh in Kermanshahan Province. He was killed by some of Mohammad Ali Shah Qajar's loyal troops who remained in Iran. Arshak Gavafian (Keri) later killed the murderers of Yeprem Khan in revenge.

He is buried in St. Mary Church in downtown Tehran.

== Legacy ==
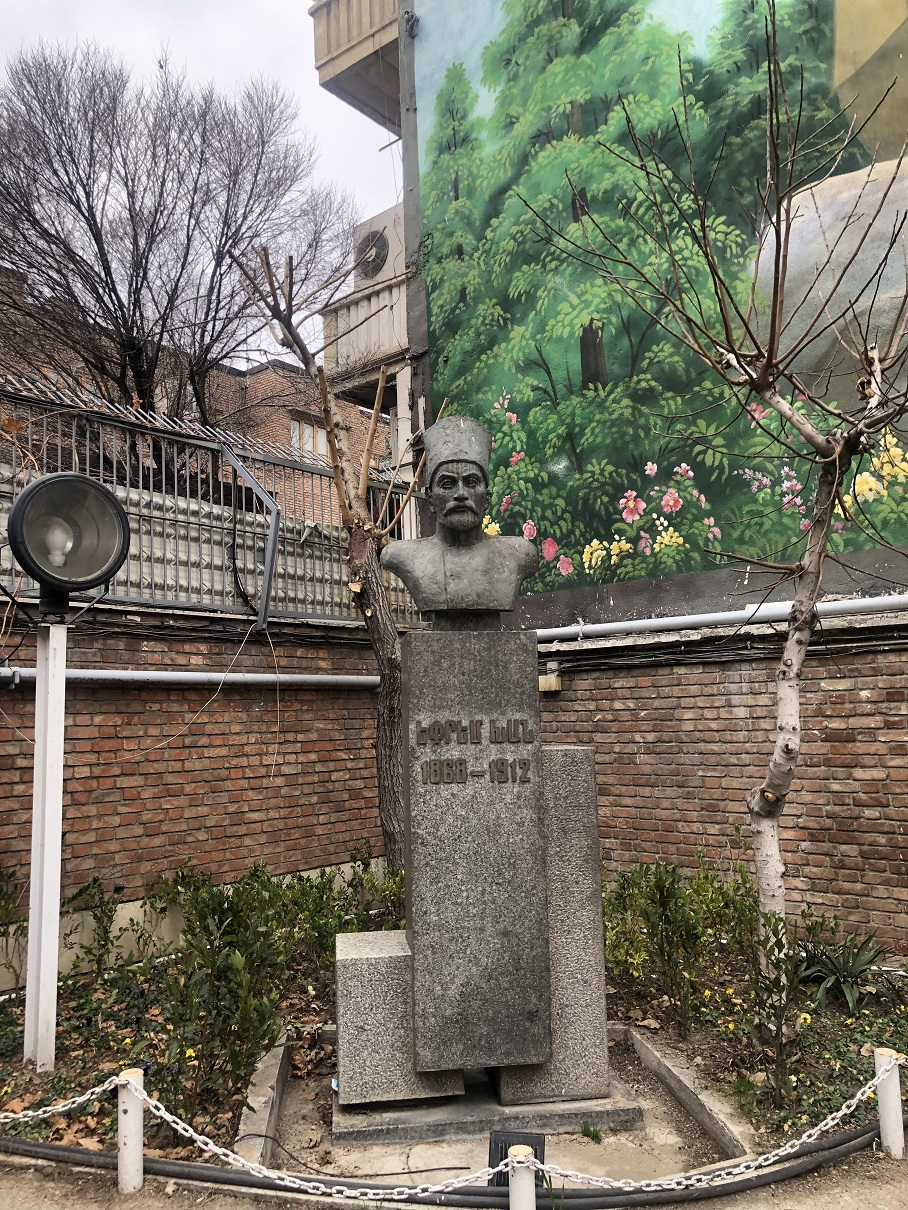
Yeprem Khan's grave at Holy Mother of God Church, Tehran

Yeprem Khan is today, along with many important figures like Sattar Khan, considered a national hero of Iran. He is also praised by Iranian historians such as Ahmad Kasravi and by Morgan Shuster, treasurer-general of Persia in that time. There exists a popular Armenian patriotic song dedicated to the memory and deeds of Yeprem Khan. The Iranian sculptor Lilit Teryan has created a sculpture of Khan. The statue is at St Mary's church in Tehran.
