= Lilit Teryan =

Iranian-born sculptor of Armenian heritage

Lilit Teryan Լիլիթ Տերյան
- لیلیت تریان
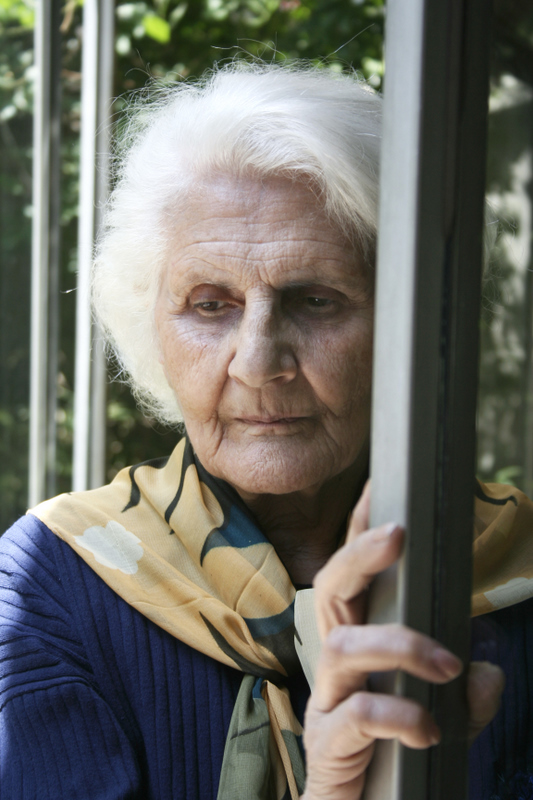
- Born: Լիլիթ Տերյան; 31 December 1930; Tehran, Iran
- Died: 7 March 2019 (aged 88); Tehran, Iran
- Resting place: Burastan Khavaran Cemetery
- Education: Paris University
- Occupation: Teacher
- Employer: Azad University
- Known for: Reintroducing sculpture to Iran

Lilit Teryan or Liliet Teryan (31 December 1930 – 7 March 2019) was an Iranian born sculptor of Armenian heritage. She had to cease teaching sculpture when it was prohibited in Tehran. She began to exhibit in 2008 and then to teach again. She has been called the Mother of Iranian sculpture.

== Life ==
Teryan was born in Tehran in 1930. She was born in the Naderi area of the city. Her parents were from Armenia. Her mother had been trained as an artist in France and her father worked for the Bank of Tehran. Her mother helped to train her daughter's artistic skills.

She took formal art training in Paris at the Beaux Art Academy.

She was trained to teach sculpture and was one of the first to teach in Iran. She taught at the Faculty of Decorative Arts at the University of Tehran. After the revolution the teaching of sculpture became illegal and she had to continue the teaching in secrecy.

The first sight of her work in Tehran was at an exhibition at Tehran Silver Publishing in 2008. Some time after this she began to teach sculpture again at Azad University. She has been called the Mother of Iranian sculpture.

She has created a statue of Mesrop Mashtots the founder of the Armenian alphabet and of the Iranian national hero Yeprem Khan. The statue is at St Mary's church in Tehran.

== Death ==
Teryan died in 2019 in her home city after a fall down some stairs.
