= Battle of Rasht =

1909 battle

The Battle of Rasht is a battle that took place in Rasht in 1909 during the Persian Constitutional Revolution.

== Background ==
In 1907 Muhammad Ali Sardar Afkham became the ruler of Guilan by Mohammad Ali Shah to control the peasant uprisings. Sardar Afkham had previously executed eleven constitutionalists in Tabriz, and Mohammad Ali Shah trusted him.

As soon as he arrived in Rasht, Sardar Afkham began suppressing the uprising of the peasants and executing many.

== Start of Constitutionalism in Gilan ==
The wave of awakening of the Iranian people, which had also spread to Gilan as a result of the excessive oppression of the rulers, had led to the emergence of anti-government free-thinking groups in Rasht. Among the various associations, Sattar Committee (fa) was the most important.

Among the people of Rasht, there were ardent opponents of the constitutional government, such as Mullah Mohammad Khamami (fa), who believed that the constitution was one of the innovations of the European people and issued a fatwa in this regard. Khamami assisted Sardar Afkham in the fight against constitutionalism and in his view "constitutionalists must be executed and exiled".

However, various militant associations were formed in the cities of Gilan and in particular Rasht in support of the constitutionalists.

== Attack on Sardar Afkham Palace ==
The rebellion in Rasht began on 8 February. Sardar Afkham had turned the palace into a center for thugs and repressors to counter possible riots. For this reason, the Mujahideen of Gilan, including members of the Sattar Committee, decided to eliminate Sardar Afkham by any means possible.

On the day that Sardar Afkham received a party in his palace, with people such as Sepahalar Moin al-Dawlah attending, the Mujahideen of Gilan moved from the three points; first to the house of Yusuf Khan (deputy of the Divan), the second to the garden of Haji Vakil and the third to the house of Mirza Karim Khan. Fifteen of them then stormed into the palace with Sardar Mohya. The rest of the mujahideen, led by Yeprem Khan, went downtown to clash with the law enforcement.

== Event Reflection and Impact on the Constitutional Revolution ==
The battle of Rasht not only reflected the anger and discontent of the Gilani against the tyranny of the rulers, but its reflection throughout Iran gave a new spirit to the constitutionalists and freedom-seekers. The Battle of Rasht also exposed the abuse of some members of the Constitutional Revolution. Eleven men and women were executed by Yeprem Khan's forces for collaborating with the Qajar government, and civil war between the groups was thought to have led to the failure of the constitutionalists.
