= Saint Sarkis Cathedral, Tehran =

Cathedral in Tehran, Iran

Saint Sarkis Cathedral Սուրբ Սարգիս մայր տաճար کلیسای سرکیس مقدس
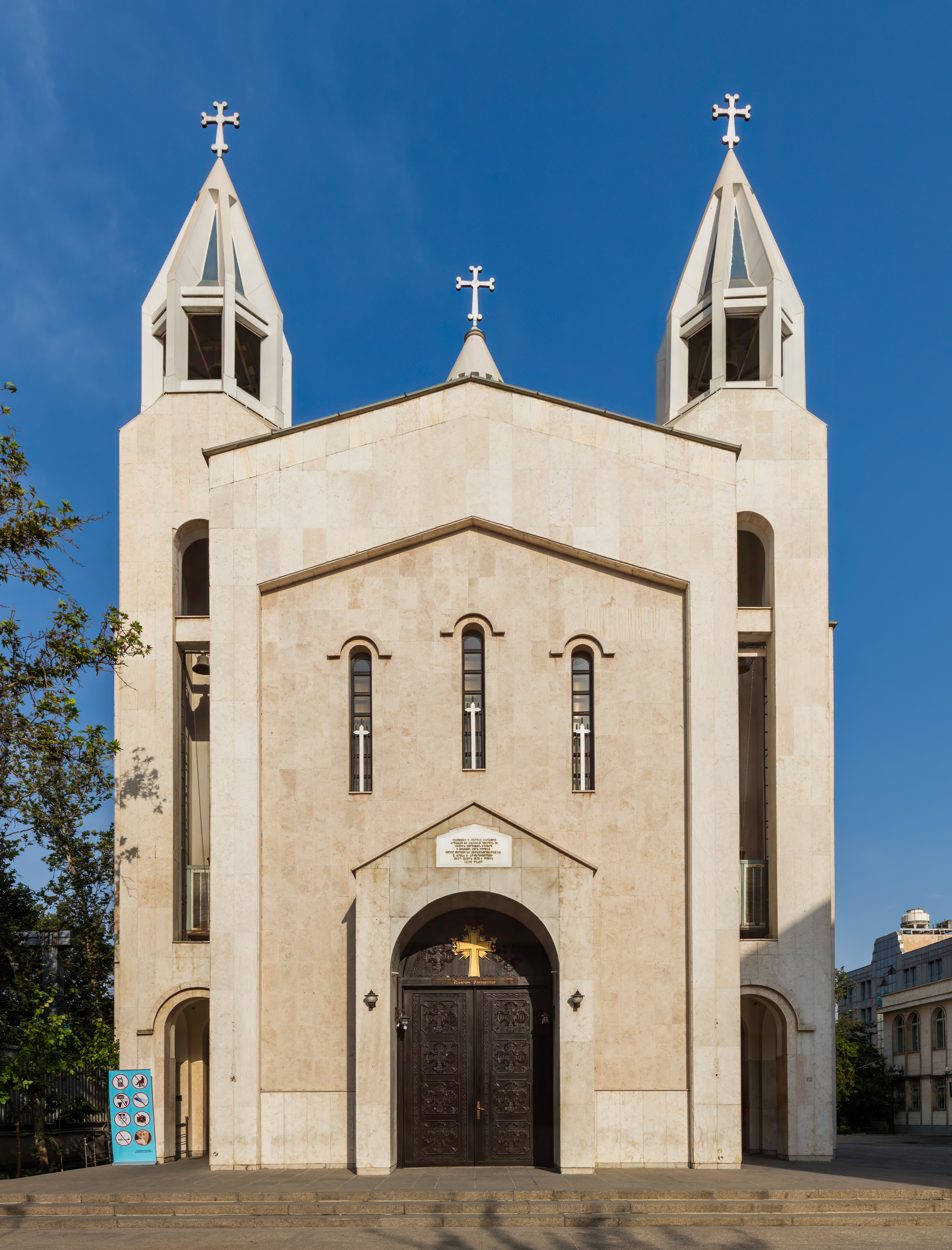
- Sarkis Cathedral in Tehran, 2016

- Location within Iran

Religion
- Affiliation: Armenian Apostolic Church

Location
- Location: Tehran, Iran
- Coordinates: 35.7149°N 51.4151°E

Architecture
- Completed: 1971

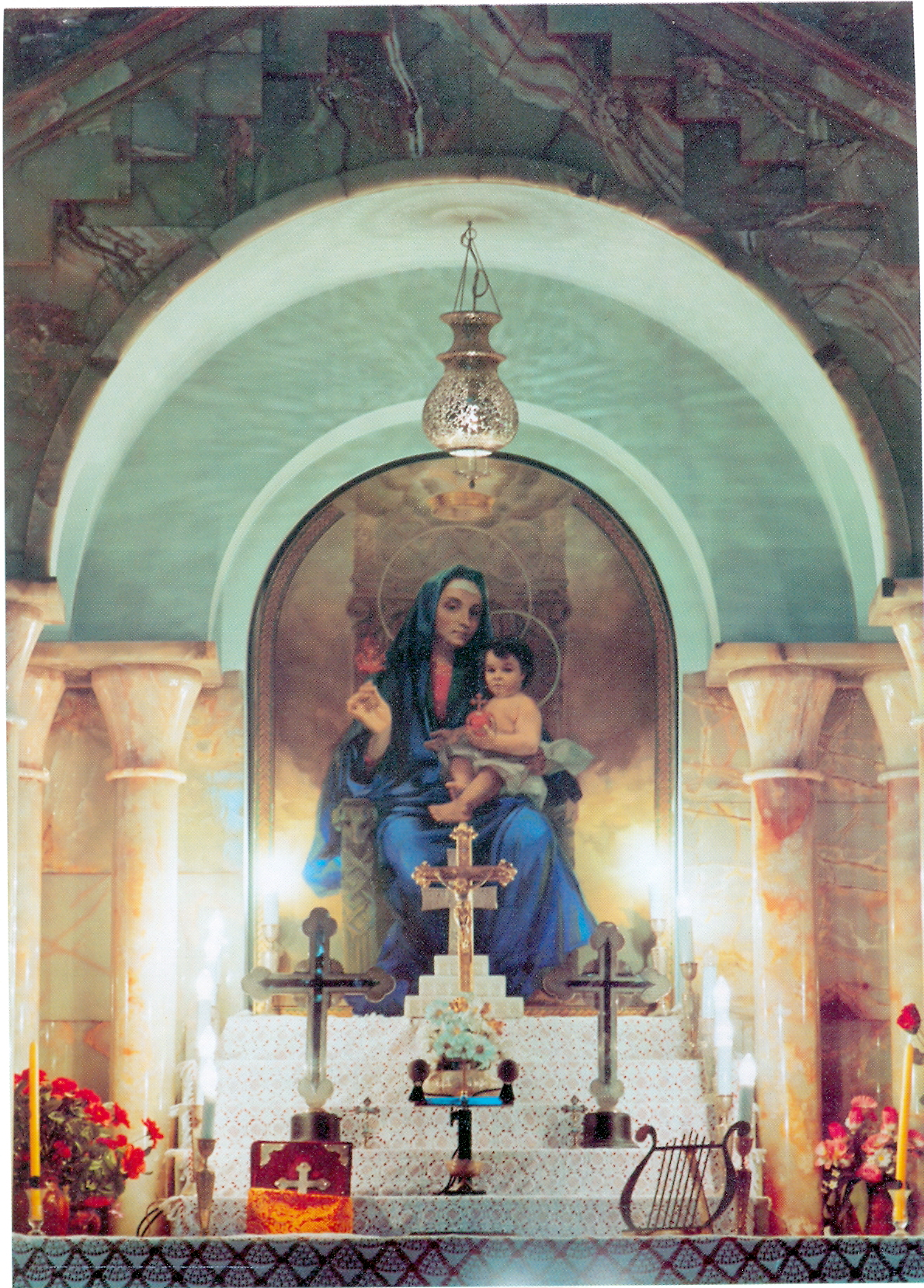
St. Sarkis Church altar, Saint Mary with Jesus

Saint Sarkis Cathedral (Armenian: Սուրբ Սարգիս մայր տաճար, romanized: Surp Sarkis mayr tachar; Persian: کلیسای سرکیس مقدس, romanized: Kelisâ-ye Sarkis-e Moqaddas) is an Armenian Apostolic church in Tehran, Iran, completed in 1970 and named after Saint Sarkis the Warrior. It is the cathedral of the Armenian Diocese of Tehran, one of three Armenian dioceses in Iran, whose prelate is archbishop Sepuh Sargsyan.

== Location ==
Saint Sarkis Cathedral is located at Karimkhan Zand Street, at the beginning of Nejatollahi Street (former Villa Street) in Tehran.

== Architecture ==
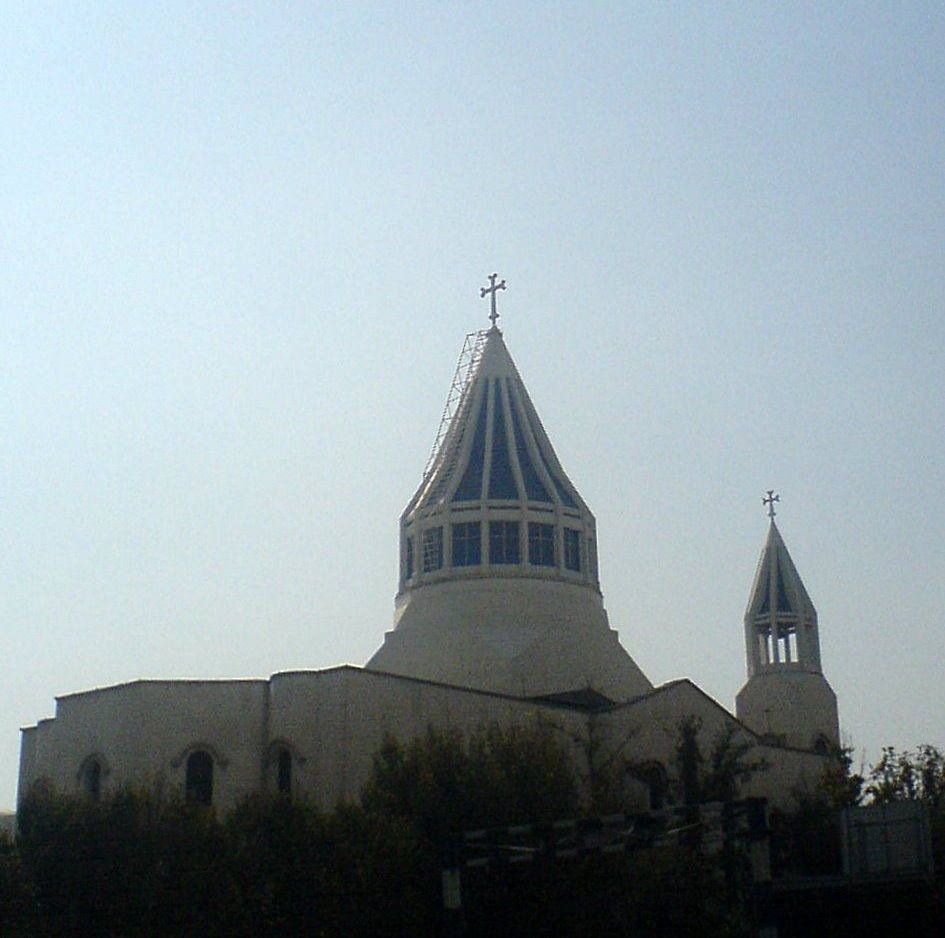
St. Sarkis Cathedral with its main dome and one of its belfries

Saint Sarkis Cathedral, which is the largest church in Tehran, has a length of 36.5 meters and a width of 17.8 meters. It is a single-nave church built out of concrete whose exterior and interior walls as well as the floor are covered with white marble. It was originally built without interior columns with the hexagonal dome borne just by its walls, but when the danger of the dome falling down was seen, four bearing columns were added. The church has a gallery for the choir from which hymns are performed. The church has two belfries with domes on top, one on each side of the entrance hall on the western side. The bells are pulled by electric power. The belfry domes as well as the main dome are decorated with octagonal rods.

As in other Armenian churches, the half-circle altar is on the eastern side of the building. On both sides of the altar there are vestries with side entrances. The walls above the altar and its two sides are covered with paintings showing Bible themes: Saint Mary with Jesus, the Ascension of Christ into Heaven, John the Baptist baptizing Jesus and the Crucifixion of Jesus.

== History ==
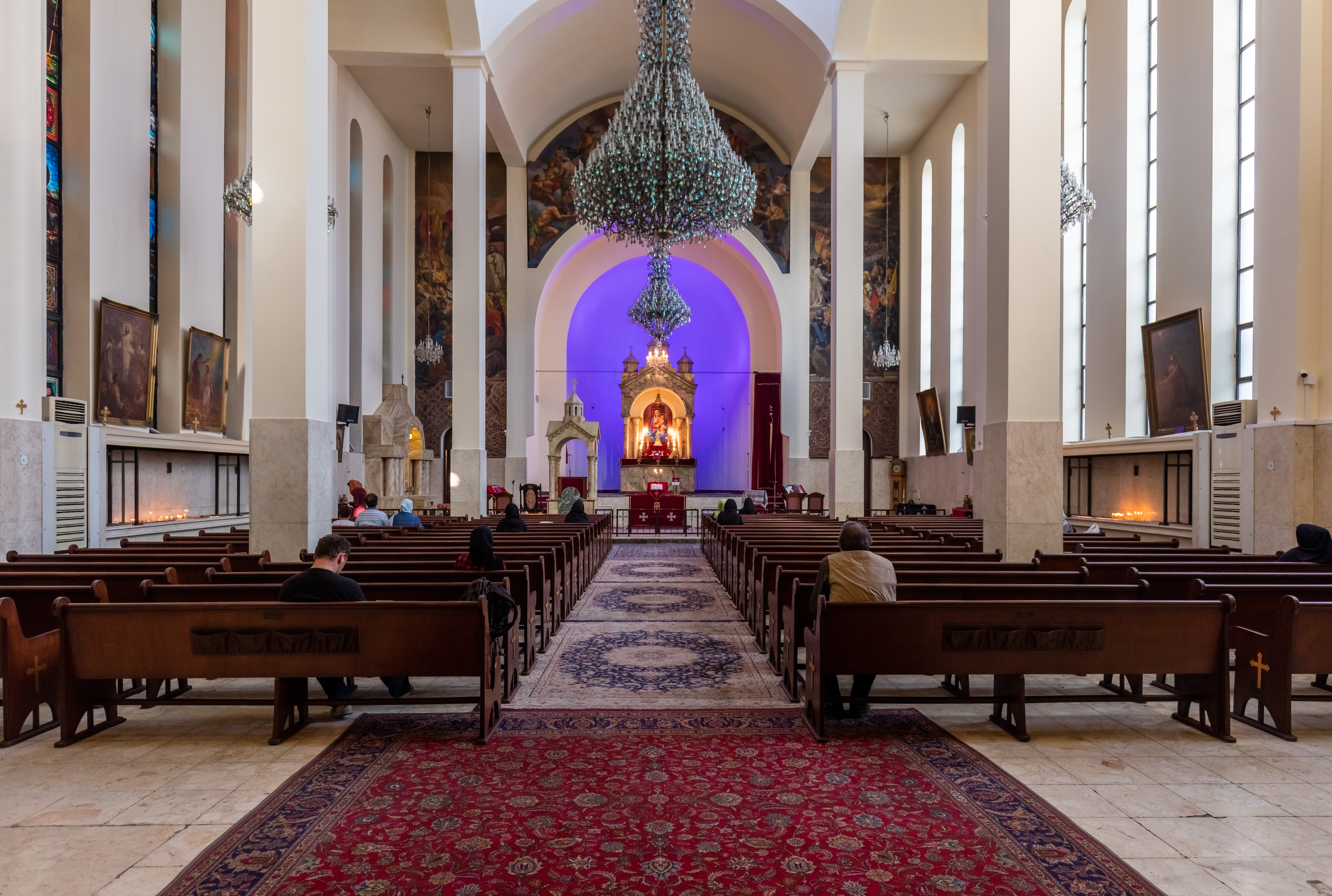
Interior of San Sarkis Cathedral

Since the completion of Holy Mother of God Church in central Tehran in 1945, the Tehran prelacy was located in the premises of that church. In the early 1960s it was decided to change the site of the prelacy offices into a new location. Therefore, the bishop and committee members of the time asked Markar Sarkisian, an Armenian benefactor, to help them in this cause. Since Markar died soon, his sons Gurgen and Vasgen Sarkisian financed the church project in memory of their parents. The committee bought land located at the end of Villa Street (now called Nejatollahi Street). The construction of St. Sarkis Church in Tehran began in 1964 and was completed in 1970. The church was renovated in 2000.

In 2006, Mr. Hrair Hagopian renovated the baptism pool and the church in memory of his beloved wife Vartoohi Davidian.

== Armenian Genocide Memorial in Tehran ==
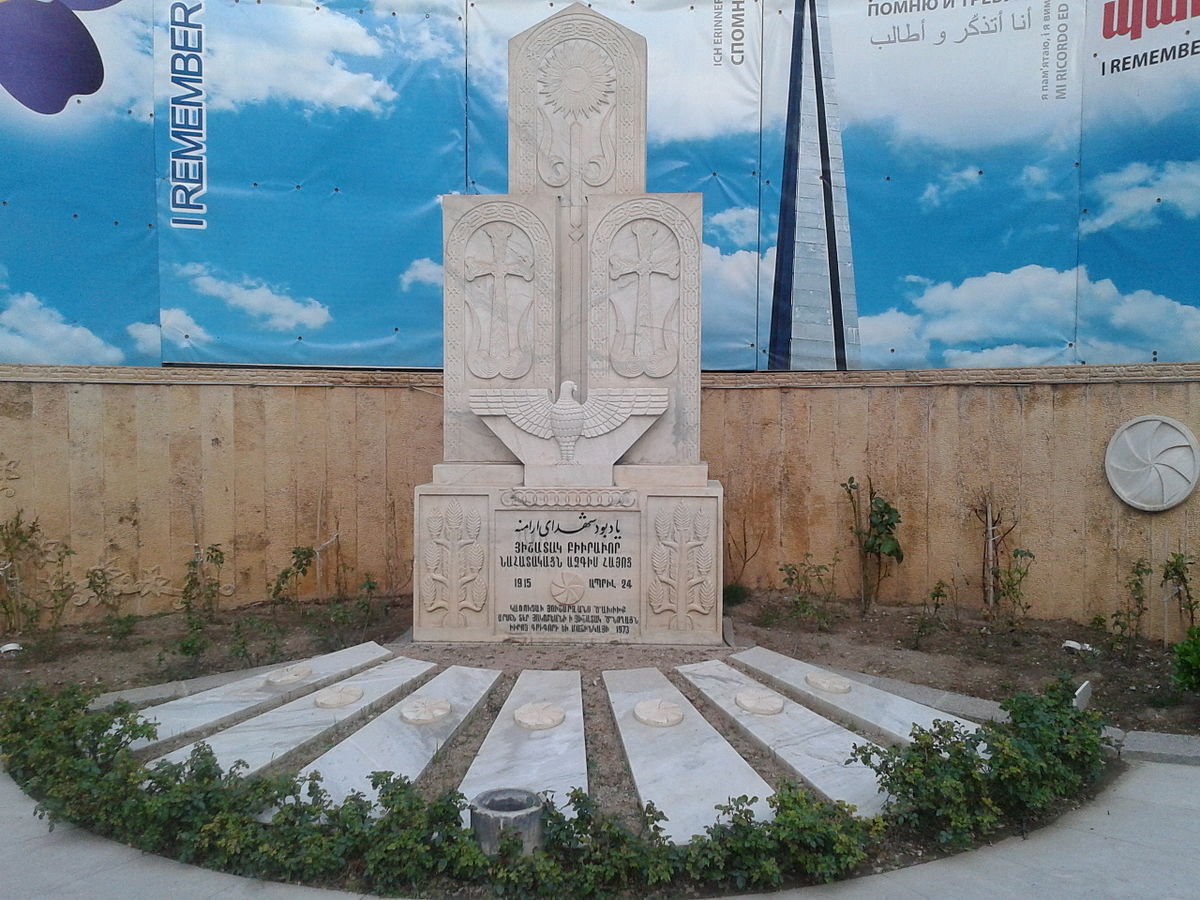
Armenian Genocide Memorial, 2016

In the courtyard there is an Armenian genocide memorial made of white marble. It is 3.50 meters high, and on its pedestal there are inscriptions in Persian and Armenian as well as the date 24 April 1915. The monument was unveiled on 24 April 1973, on the fifty-eighth anniversary of the Armenian genocide.

== See also ==
- Iranian Armenians
- Christianity in Iran
- List of Armenian churches in Iran

== Bibliography ==
- دانشنامۀ ایرانیان ارمنی، نویسنده: ژانت د. لازاریان، تهران: انتشارات هیرمند، چاپ دوم: ۱۳۸۸، شابک: ۰-۵۰-۶۹۷۴-۹۶۴-۹۷۸ [Janet D. Lazarian. Encyclopedia of Iranian Armenians. Tehran: Hirmand Publication, Second Edition, 2009]. ISBN 978-964-6974-50-0
- کلیسای سرکیس مقدس تهران، کلیساهای تاریخی ایران، درگاه کویر، معماری و بناها [Church of the Holy Sarkis of Tehran, Historical Churches of Iran, Desert Harbor, Architecture and buildings].
- بنای یادبود شهیدان نژادکشی ارمنیان، نویسنده: ادوارد هاروتونیان، فصلنامۀ فرهنگی پیمان، شمارۀ ۶۹، سال هجدهم، پاییز ۱۳۹۳ [Edward Harutonian. Armenian Genocide Memorial. Peyman Cultural Petition, No. 69, Eighteenth Volume, Autumn 2014].
- کلیساهای ارامنۀ ایران، مؤلف: لینا ملکمیان، چاپ دوم، زمستان ۱۳۸۰، دفتر پژوهش‌های فرهنگی [Lina Malcolmian. Churches of Armenians in Iran. Second Edition, Winter 2001, Office of Cultural Studies].
