= Sepuh Sargsyan =

Armenian apostolic clergyman

The Most Reverend Sepuh Sargsyan
- Archbishop of Armenian Diocese of Tehran
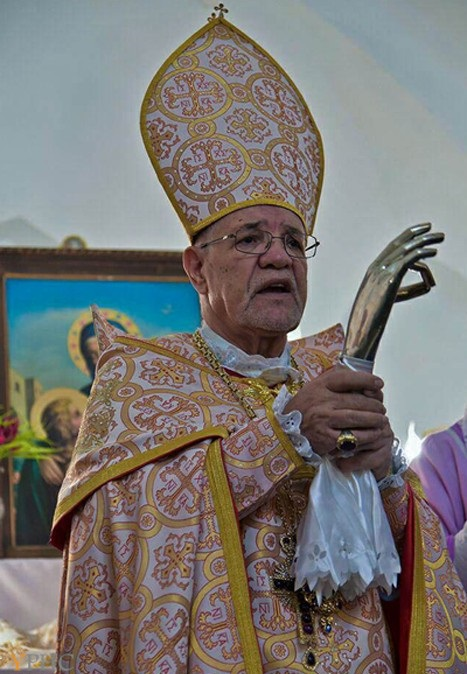
- Church: Armenian Apostolic Church
- See: Holy See of Cilicia
- Appointed: December 1999
- Predecessor: Ardak Manoukian

Personal details
- Born: Sebuh Sarkisian; 26 October 1946 (age 79) Syria
- Denomination: Armenian Apostolic

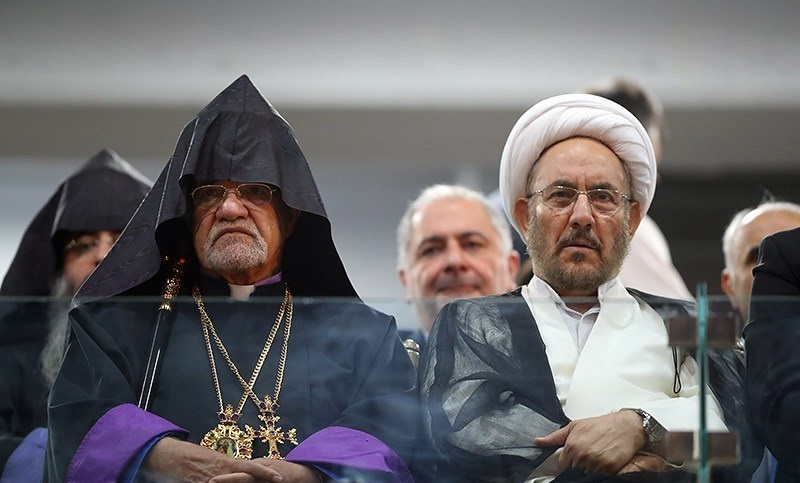
Opening ceremony of Pan-Armenian Games at the Ararat Stadium on 13 September 2016: Sepuh Sargsyan (left) and Ali Younesi (right)

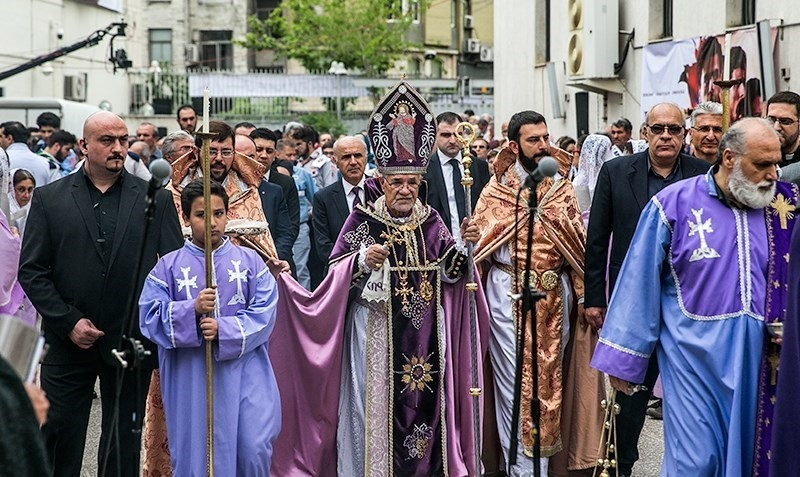
Armenian Genocide Remembrance Day in Tehran, 2017

Sepuh Sargsyan (traditional Eastern Armenian Սեպուհ Սարգսեան, Persian سبوه سرکیسیان, in reformed orthography Սեպուհ Սարգսյան) or Sebouh Sarkissian (Western Armenian Սեբուհ Սարկիսյան, born in 1946 in Qamishli, Syria) is an Armenian Apostolic prelate who has served as archbishop of the Armenian Diocese of Tehran since 1999.

== Biography ==
Sebouh Sarkissian grew up in the Armenian community of Qamishli, where he went to the local Armenian School and learned Western Armenian as well as Arabic. In 1961 he entered the Armenian Seminary of the Holy See of Cilicia in Antelias in Lebanon. He became a deacon in 1965 und was ordained a priest in 1968. From 1968 to 1970 he studied Arabic literature and Islamic philosophy at Saint Joseph University in Beirut. From 1970 to 1974, he worked as a pastor in Basra (Iraq) and taught Armenian language, history, and religion at an Armenian school. In 1978, he became a member of the Middle East Council of Churches and was Director General of Sunday schools in Lebanon from 1978 to 1998, where he was responsible for the spiritual upbringing of the new generation. From 1979 he studied Christian-Muslim relations in Birmingham, where he received the Master's degree in 1981. In 1997 he was invited by Archbishop Aram I to the International Council of Churches. Sarkissian attended many conferences at the Seminary of Antelias for the dialogue between Islam and Christianity. He is the only priest of Cilicia with a degree in Islamic studies. He is the author of numerous religious books and articles published in Armenian, Arabic and English.

In 1992, he received the episcopal ordination, and from 1992 to 1998, he was Patriarchal vicar of Kuwait and the Gulf and led the Armenian Diocese of Kuwait from 1998 to 1999. After the death of the Armenian Archbishop of Tehran, Beirut-born Artak Manukian (1931–1999), Sepuh Sargsyan was appointed locum tenens, becoming responsible for the Armenian community in the Diocese of Tehran, where he arrived on 26 December 1999. On 6 June 2000 at the 11th National Representative Assembly of the Prelacy of Tehran he was unanimously elected out of three candidates the Prelate of the Armenian Diocese of Tehran and confirmed by Catholicos Aram I. Since then he has been Armenian Archbishop of Tehran.

On 4 April 2016, he held a service at Saint Sarkis Cathedral of Tehran in remembrance of the Armenian soldiers fallen during the 2016 Nagorno-Karabakh clashes. He stated that the most important thing in human life is the sacrifice of love for the homeland. On 24 July 2017 he was received in Stepanakert by the President of the Republic of Artsakh, Bako Sahakyan.

== Political views ==
In an interview with the Armenian-language daily Alik of Tehran in November 2016 Sargsyan expressed his concern over extremist, Islamist movements in the Middle East threatening the life of Christians but he pointed out that, by contrast, in Islamic Republic of Iran it is possible for Armenian Christians to live in peace. He also greeted "our brave people in Syria and especially the Syrian-Armenian children."

Sargsyan also criticized the Trump administration's Iran policy and prayed for the protection of Iran after Donald Trump increased sanctions.
