= Mohammad Ali Khan Sardar-e Afkham =

Iranian official

Moein-e Nezam Mohammad Ali Khan Sardar-e Afkham
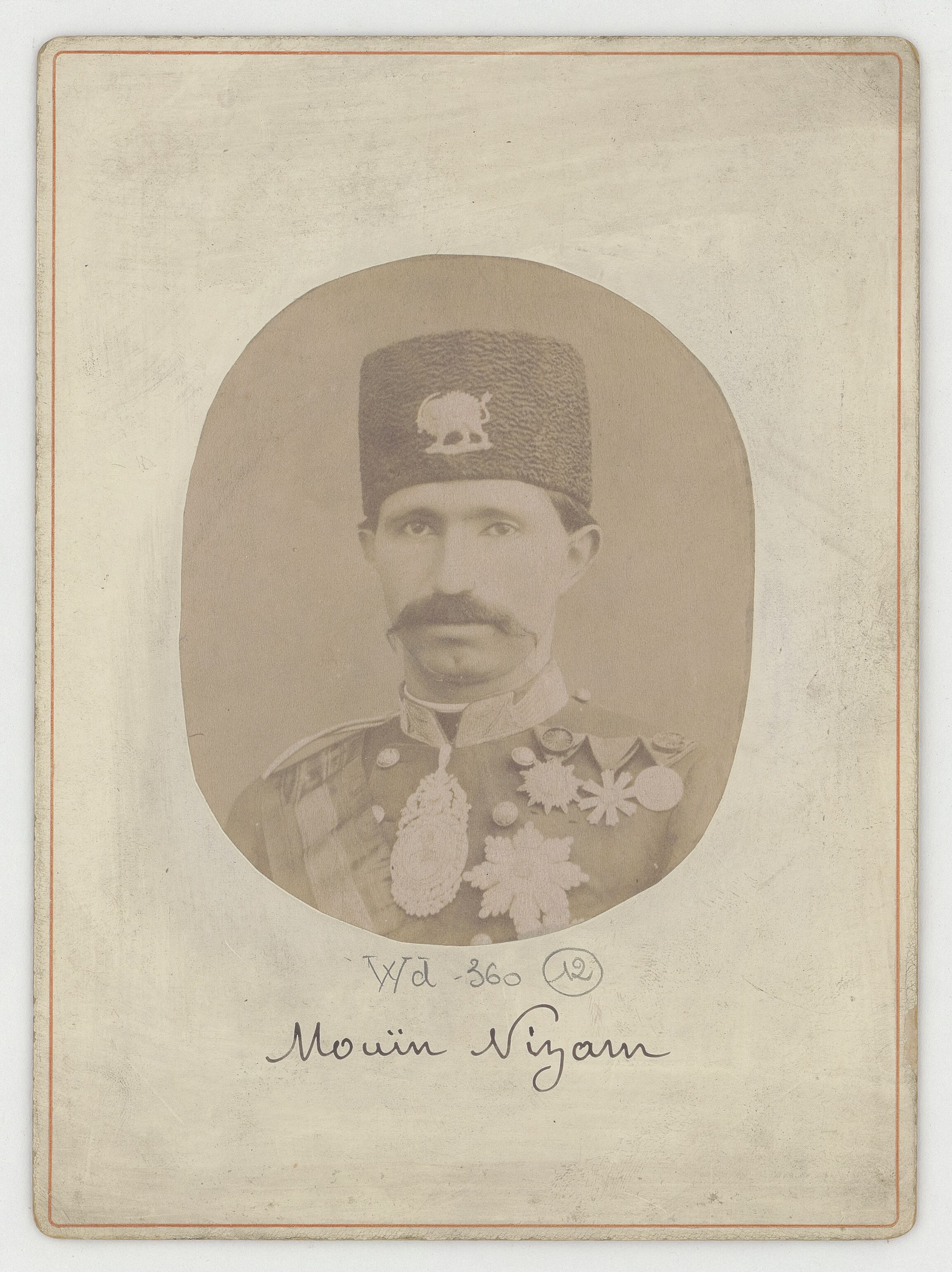
- Photograph of Moein-e Nezam by Nadar, taken before 1909

Governor of Gilan
- In office 1907–1909
- Monarch: Mohammad Ali Shah Qajar

Personal details
- Died: 7 February 1909 Rasht, Iran
- Title: Vakil od-Dowleh

Military service
- Allegiance: Qajar Iran
- Years of service: ?–7 February 1909
- Battles/wars: Tobacco Protest; Persian Constitutional Revolution; Battle of Rasht

Mohammad Ali Khan Sardar Afkham (Persian: محمدعلی خان سردار اَفخَم; d. 7 February 1909) also known as Aqa Bala Khan Sardar (Persian: آقا بالاخان سردار) was a 19th-20th century Iranian official and statesman.

== Biography and Career ==
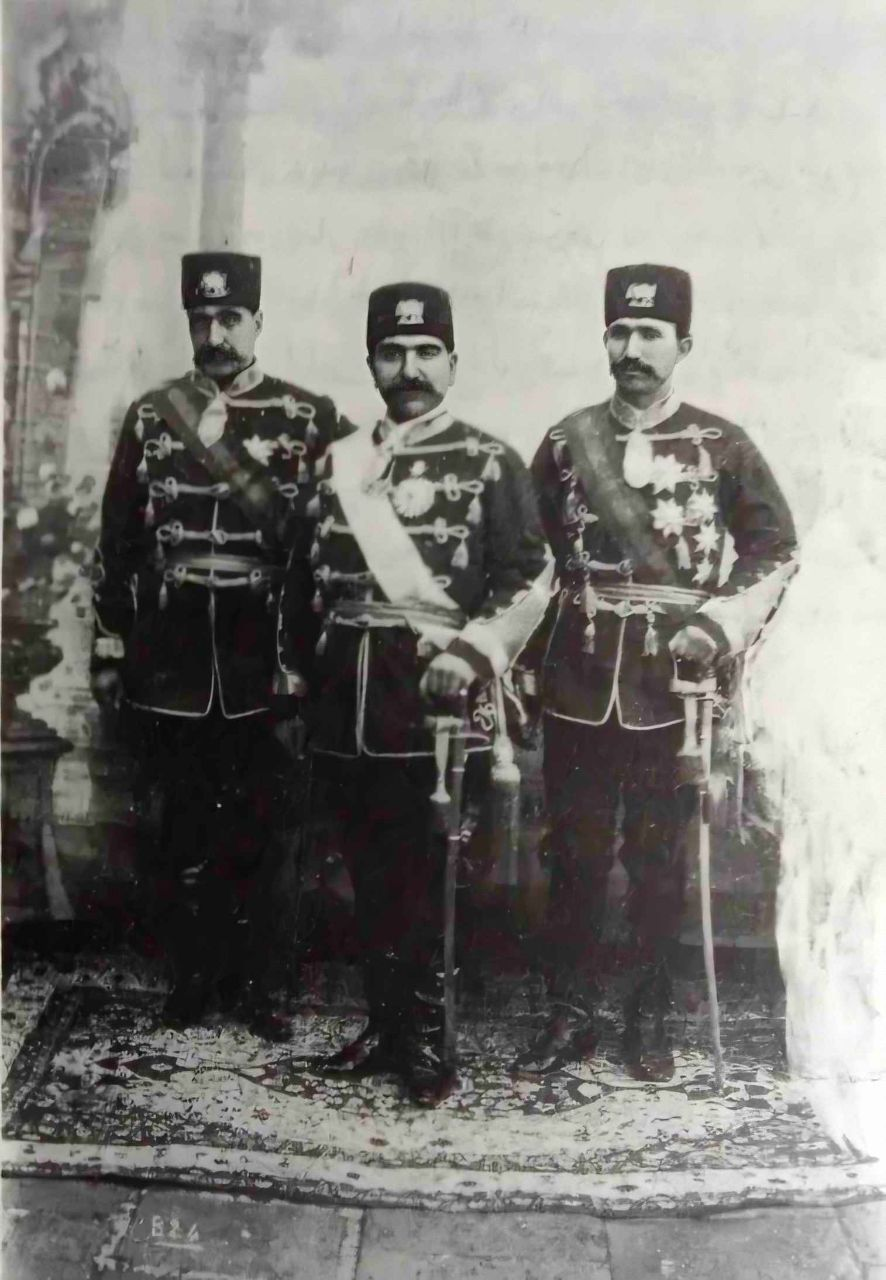
Kamran Mirza (middle) and Sardar-e Afkham (right)

Aqa Bala Khan was born into an obscure family, he joined to military in early age. He rose rapidly after attracting the attention of Naser al-Din Shah's son, Kamran Mirza, Minister of War and Supreme commander of the armies. In 1887, Aqa Bala Khan received the title “Moein-e Nezam” and appointed as commander of Kamran Mirza's special regiment. In 1891 he became Amir Tuman (Division Commander) and Chief of the arsenal, In next year he received the title Vakil od-Dowleh and succeeded Jahangir Khan as Minister of Industries.

On 4 January 1892, a large demonstration against the foreign tobacco monopoly took place in front of palace in Tehran. After Kamran Mirza's attempt to suppress of demonstrators ended ignominiously, Aqa Bala Khan ordered the royal guards to open fire, as result approximately 30 people were killed or wounded.

Aqa Bala Khan's career continued to advance with his assiduous application to police work, and 1895 or 1896 he was named Sardar-e Afkham. Under Mohammad Ali Shah, in 1907 he was appointed governor of Gilan but on 7 February 1909, he was assassinated in Rasht.

== Sources ==
- Mahbubi Ardakani, Hosayn (1986). "ĀQĀ BĀLĀ KHAN SARDĀR". In Yarshater, Ehsan (ed.). Encyclopædia Iranica (Online ed.). Encyclopædia Iranica Foundation.
- E'temad os-Saltaneh, Mohammad Hasan Khan (1966). Afshar, Iraj (ed.). روزنامه خاطرات اعتمادالسلطنه (Ruzname-ye Khatirat-e Etemad al-Saltaneh; The Diary of Etemad al-Saltaneh) (in Persian). Tehran: Amir Kabir Publishers.
- Mostowfi, Abdollah (1964). شرح زندگانی من (Sharh-e Zendegani-ye Man; The Story of My Life) (in Persian). Vol. 2. Tehran: Zovvar.
- Amin od-Dowleh, Mirza Ali Khan (1962). Farman-Farmaian, Hafez (ed.). خاطرات سیاسی میرزا علی خان امین الدوله (Khatirat-e Siyasi-ye Mirza Ali Khan Amin al-Dawla; Political Memoirs of Mirza Ali Khan Amin al-Dawla) (in Persian). Tehran: Sherkat-e Sahami-ye Ketabha-ye Iran.
- Malekzadeh, Mehdi (1984). تاریخ انقلاب مشروطیت ایران (Tarikh-e Enqelab-e Mashrutiyat-e Iran; History of the Persian Constitutional Revolution) (in Persian). Tehran: Sokhan. ISBN 964-372-094-2.
