= Barsum =

- Location within Azerbaijan
- Coordinates: 40°39′N 45°59′E
- Country: Azerbaijan
- Rayon: Shamkir
- Time zone: UTC+4 (AZT)
  - Summer (DST): UTC+5 (AZT)

Barsum is a village in the Shamkir Rayon of Azerbaijan.

Yeprem Khan, the Armenian-Iranian revolutionary of the Iranian constitutional revolution was born in Barsum. Armenian international football player, Poghos Galstyan was born in Barsum.
