= Battle of Varamin =

Battle of the Persian Constitutional Revolution, 1911

Date	5 September 1911
Location	Varamin, Qajar Iran
Result	Nationalist victory

Belligerents
Nationalist forces; Iranian Gendarmes; Armenian volunteers; Bakhtiaris	Royalist forces Turkmen tribesmen

Commanders and leaders
Yeprem Khan	Arshad al-Dawleh (POW) (executed)

Strength
1,200	1,600 cavalry 400 infantry

Casualties and losses
Unknown	70 killed 200 captured 400 wounded

The Battle of Varamin was a battle of the Persian Constitutional Revolution which was fought in 1911 between the Qajar dynasty under Arshad Al-Dawleh and Majlis forces under Yeprem Khan.

In 1909 or 1910 (sources differ), Muhammad Ali Shah Qajar was deposed from his position as Shah of Persia and exiled to Russia by the constitutional revolution. In July 1911 Muhammad Ali returned to Persia to retake power. On 5 September 1911, almost 1,200 Gendarmes, Bakhtiari, and Armenian volunteers, led by Yeprem Khan, fought 2,000 Turkman tribesmen under Al-Dawleh. The battle was a defeat for the forces under Muhammad Ali's banner, and forced him to flee to Russian Protection.

== Background ==
In 1907, Muzaf-far al-Din Shah died. Immediately before his death, he was forced by the constitutional revolution to grant a constitution to Persia. His successor, Muhammad Ali wanted to retake power from the new Majles. In 1908 Muhammad Ali staged a coup and attempted to restore the monarchy to a position of absolutism. This resulted in a year-long civil war, and in 1909 Muhammad Ali was exiled to Russia, and replaced by his 12-year-old son Ahmad Shah Qajar.

In 1911, Muhammad Ali returned to Persia to retake power. He recruited many members of the Shahsavan and Turkman tribes to his side. In early September, 40 miles (64 km) away from Tehran, Muhammad's general al-Dawleh fought the national forces at a battle near Varamin.

== Battle ==
The battle opened with Al-Dawleh sending in a diversion of 300 fighters into Varamin. The Nationalist forces used a maxim gun and three artillery pieces to open fire on the diversionary force, before attacking them with Bakhtiari cavalry. The diversionary force of the Royalist forces was thrown into confusion and routed back into their main army. This caused the rest of the royalist force to launch a disorderly retreat from the battlefield. Al-Dawleh was wounded and captured.

== Aftermath ==
Al-Dawleh was executed the next day. Further North, Muhammad Ali was ambushed a few days later and escaped to Russian protection. Muhammad Ali's brother Salar Al-Dawleh would be defeated as well near Qom. Ahmed Shah remained the Shah of Persia until 1925.
