= Shurcheh, Kermanshah =

Shurcheh شورچه
- Village
- Location within Iran
- Coordinates: 34°28′26″N 48°03′55″E
- Country: Iran
- Province: Kermanshah
- County: Kangavar
- Bakhsh: Central
- Rural District: Gowdin

Population (2016)
  - Total: 823
- Time zone: UTC+3:30 (IRST)
  - Summer (DST): UTC+4:30 (IRDT)

Shurcheh (Persian: شورچه, also Romanized as Shūrcheh) is a village in Gowdin Rural District, in the Central District of Kangavar County, Kermanshah Province, Iran. At the 2016 census, its population was 696, in 203 families.
