= Holy Mother of God Church, Tehran =

Armenian Apostolic church in Tehran, Iran

Holy Mother of God Church Սուրբ Աստվածածին եկեղեցի
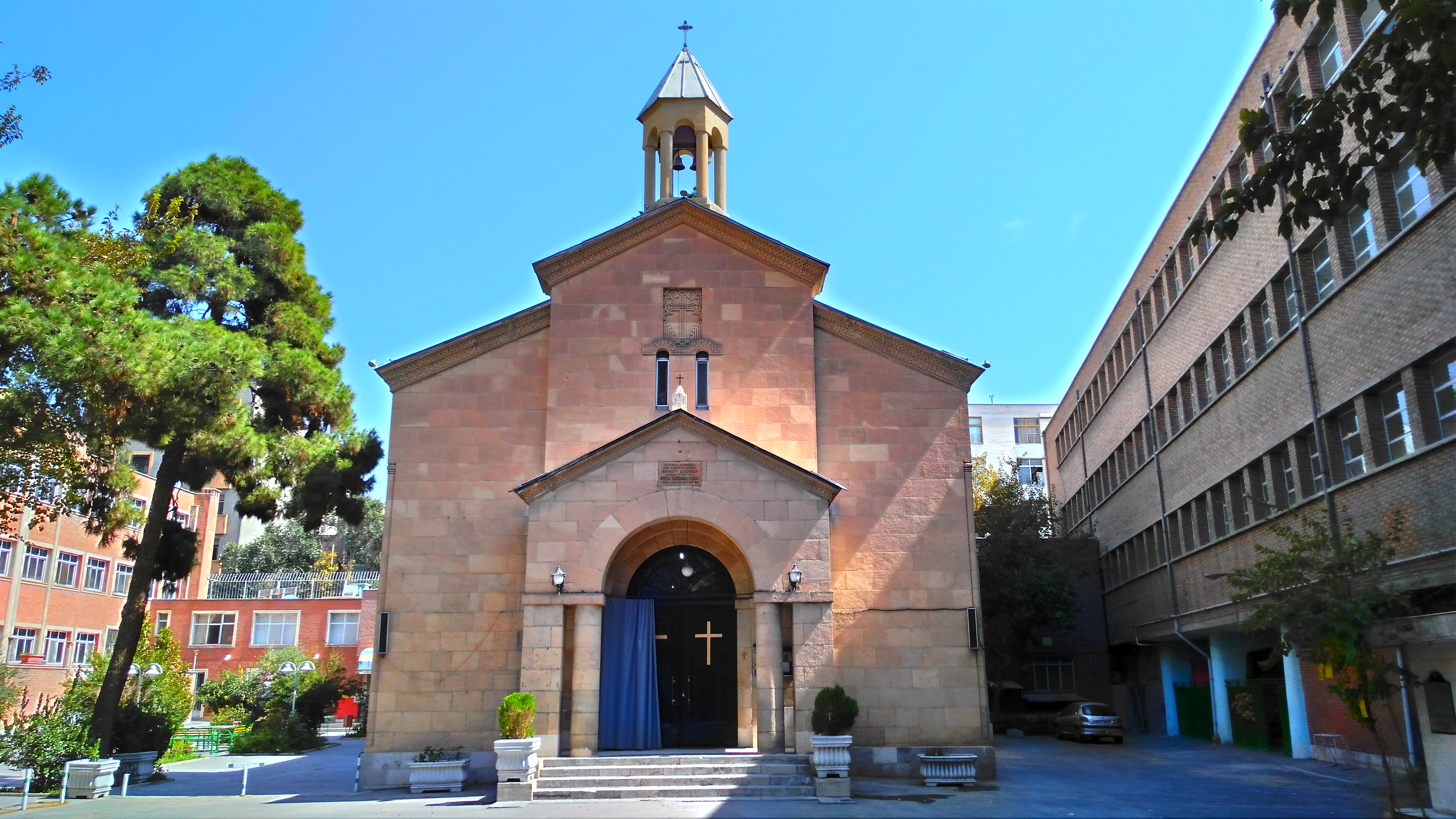
- St. Astvatsatsin Church in Tehran, 2015

- Location within Iran

Religion
- Affiliation: Armenian Apostolic Church

Location
- Location: Tehran, Iran
- Coordinates: 35.69576547°N 51.4147684°E

Architecture
- Groundbreaking: 1938
- Completed: 1945

Surp Asdvadzadzin Church, Holy Mother of God Church, or Saint Mary Church (Armenian: Սուրբ Աստվածածին եկեղեցի, Persian: کلیسای مریم مقدس), is an Armenian Apostolic church in Tehran, Iran completed in 1945.

From 1945 to 1970 the church was the official office and the residence of the Armenians' archbishop, which was then transferred to Saint Sarkis Cathedral, Tehran.

== Location ==
The Church of Holy Mary is located between Masud-e-Sad Street and Mirza Kouchak Khan Street not far from Jomhouri Avenue, Tehran.

== History ==
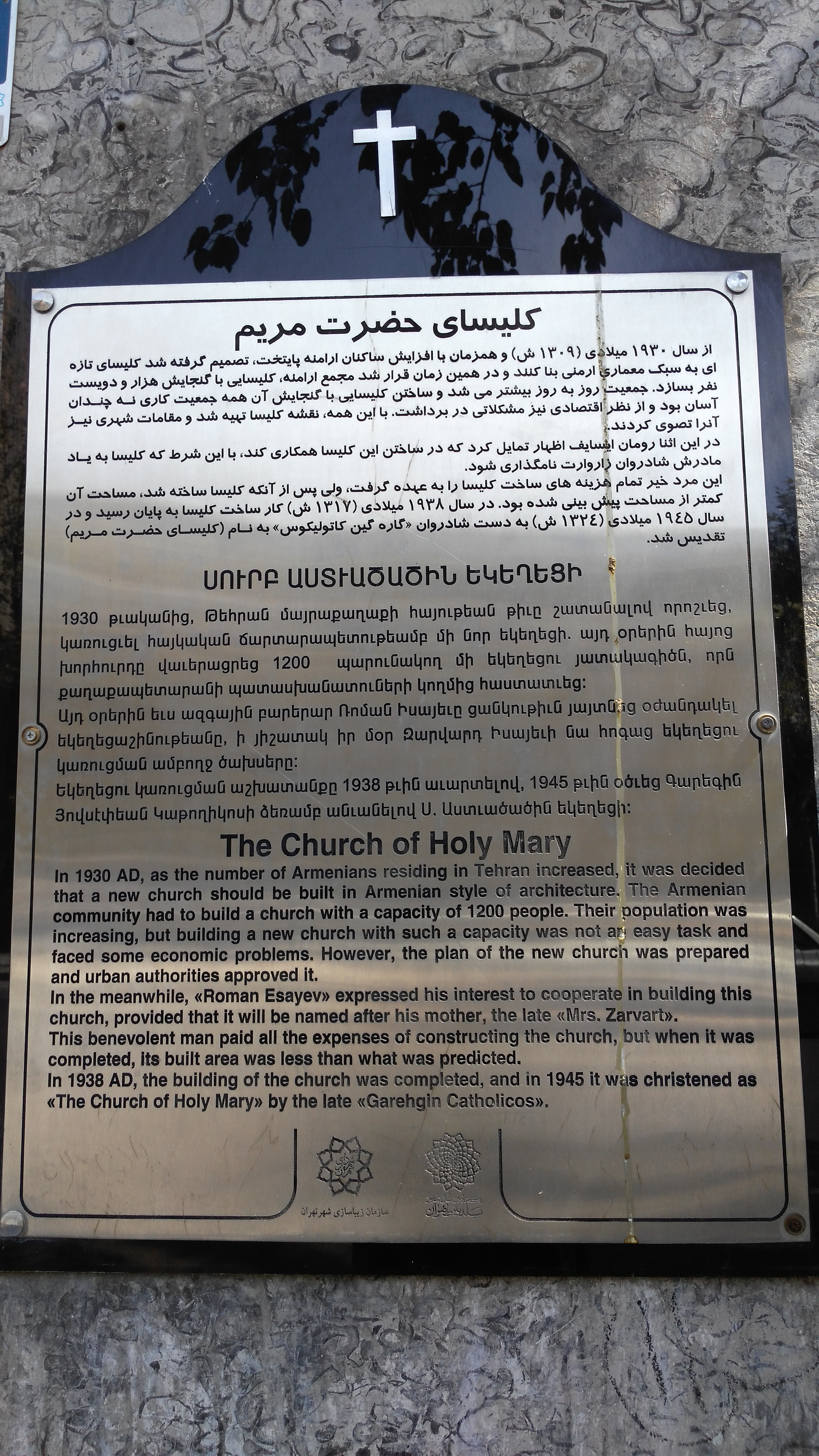
A brief history is installed outside of the church.

During and after the Armenian genocide in the Ottoman Empire and the loss of their homelands about 50,000 Armenians found refuge in Iran. After the Sovietization of Armenia in 1920 and the purges under Joseph Stalin, more refugees from Armenia crossed the border to Iran, among them Nikolai Lauri from Nagorno-Karabakh, the architect of the church. Therefore, the number of Armenians—in their majority members of the Armenian Apostolic Church—in the Iranian capital increased significantly and the need to build a new church arose.

On 17 April 1937, a meeting was held with the presence of Armenian architects, and Nikolai Lauri was asked to present a plan to build a church based on a budget of 60,000 tomans. However, Nikolai Lauri died in 1939, and the plan was realized by Nikolai Markov. Roman Isayan (called Isayev in Russia) financed the construction of the church, which cost 100,000 tomans. Construction works began on 17 April 1938 with the participation of a large number of Armenians and clergy of the churches in Tehran. The church was completed in 1938 and christened in 1945 by Karekin I, Catholicos of Cilicia, as the Church of Holy Mary.

From 1945 to 1960, it was the main office and residence of the Archbishop of the Armenians, which was later transferred to the new Saint Sarkis Cathedral completed in 1970. On 13 February 2002, the church was registered by the Cultural Heritage and Tourism Organization of Iran as a national monument, with the registration number 7237.

== Church architecture ==
The original church plan has not been preserved, but the architects of the church were inspired by the architecture of Armenian churches from the 7th and 10th centuries. The Church of Mary, which is built out of grey basalt stone, has a size of 32.5 m × 19.8 m and occupies an area of about 550 square meters. Like other Armenian churches, it has the form of a cross and its sanctuary is located on the east. The church has two domes, a larger and a smaller one. The main dome is influenced by Byzantine architecture. The main entrance of the church is on the western side.

== Arch Bishop Ardak Manokian Museum ==
One of the adjacent buildings is allocated to the Armenian National Museum. It was opened in 2000 by Aram I. Different sections of this museum exhibit pictures of some of Iran's Armenian churches, accessories used in church ceremonies, religious handwritten books, and traditional Armenian women's clothing. The museum also holds some documents and personal belongings of Ardak Manokian, as well as works done by Armenian artists. Ardak Manokian was the Armenians' Arch Bishop after the 1979 Iranian Revolution. He died in 1999 in Tehran.

== Gallery ==
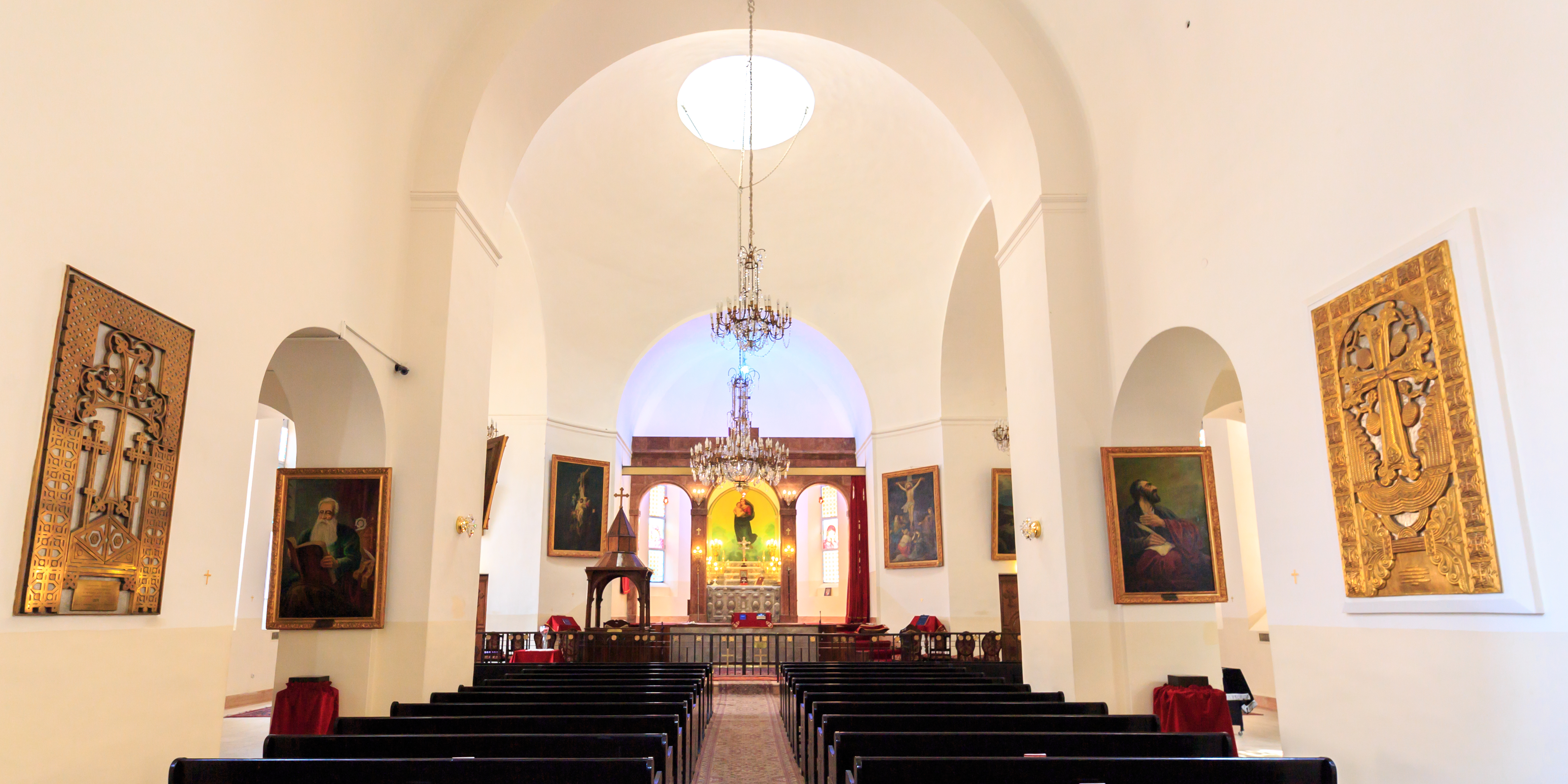
Interior of the church

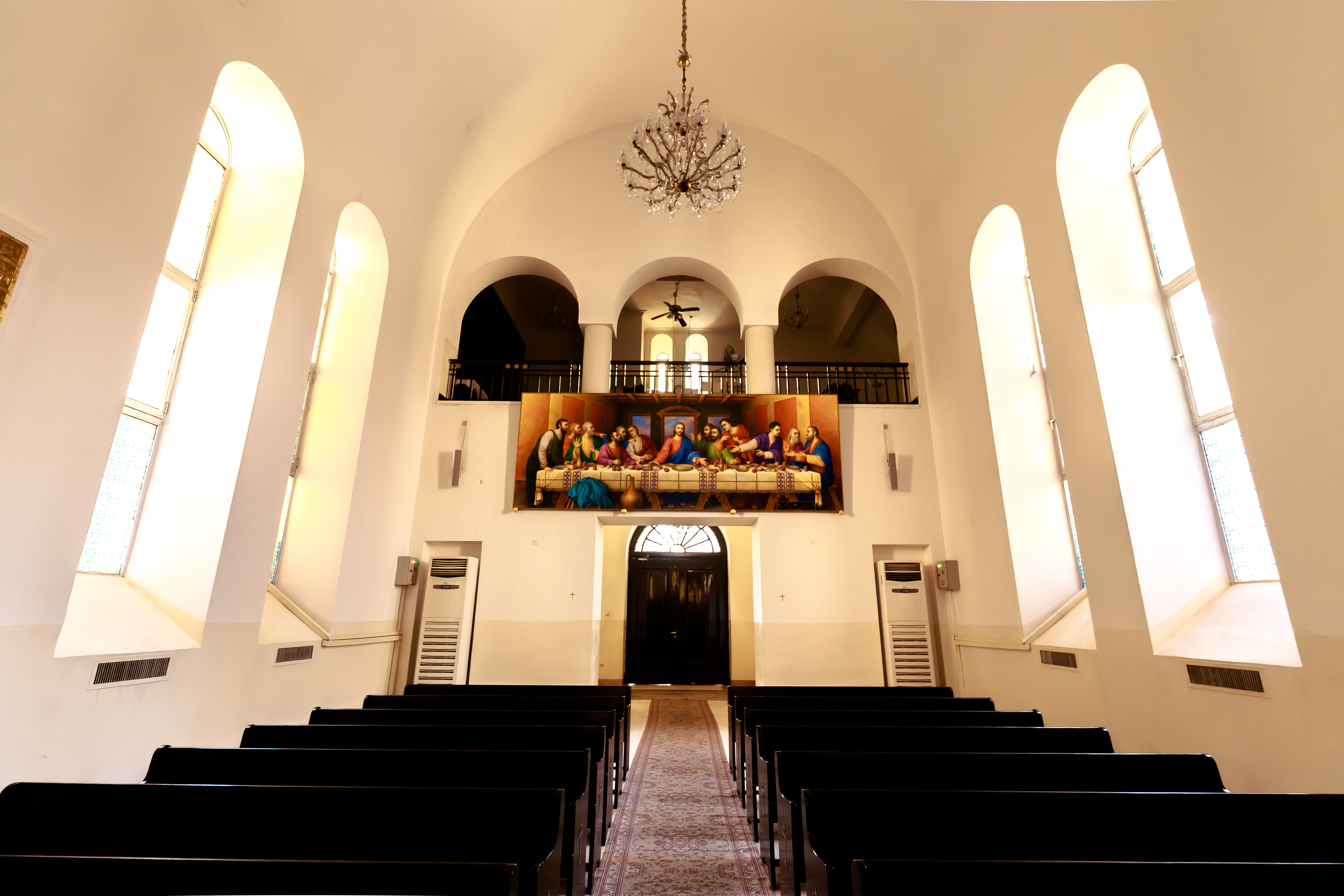
Entrance

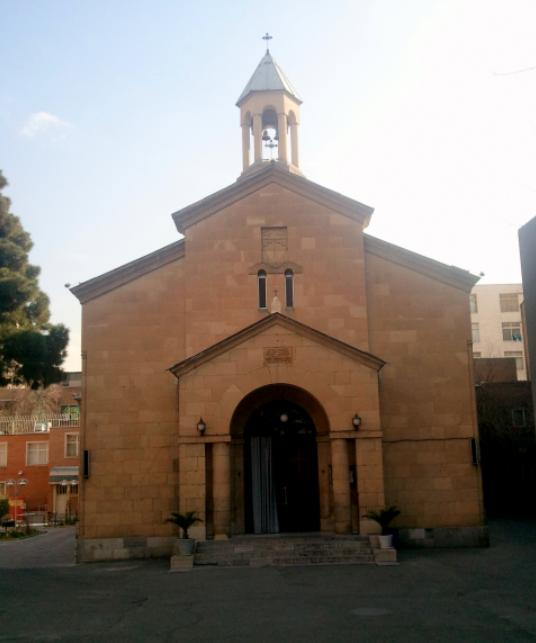
Western entrance

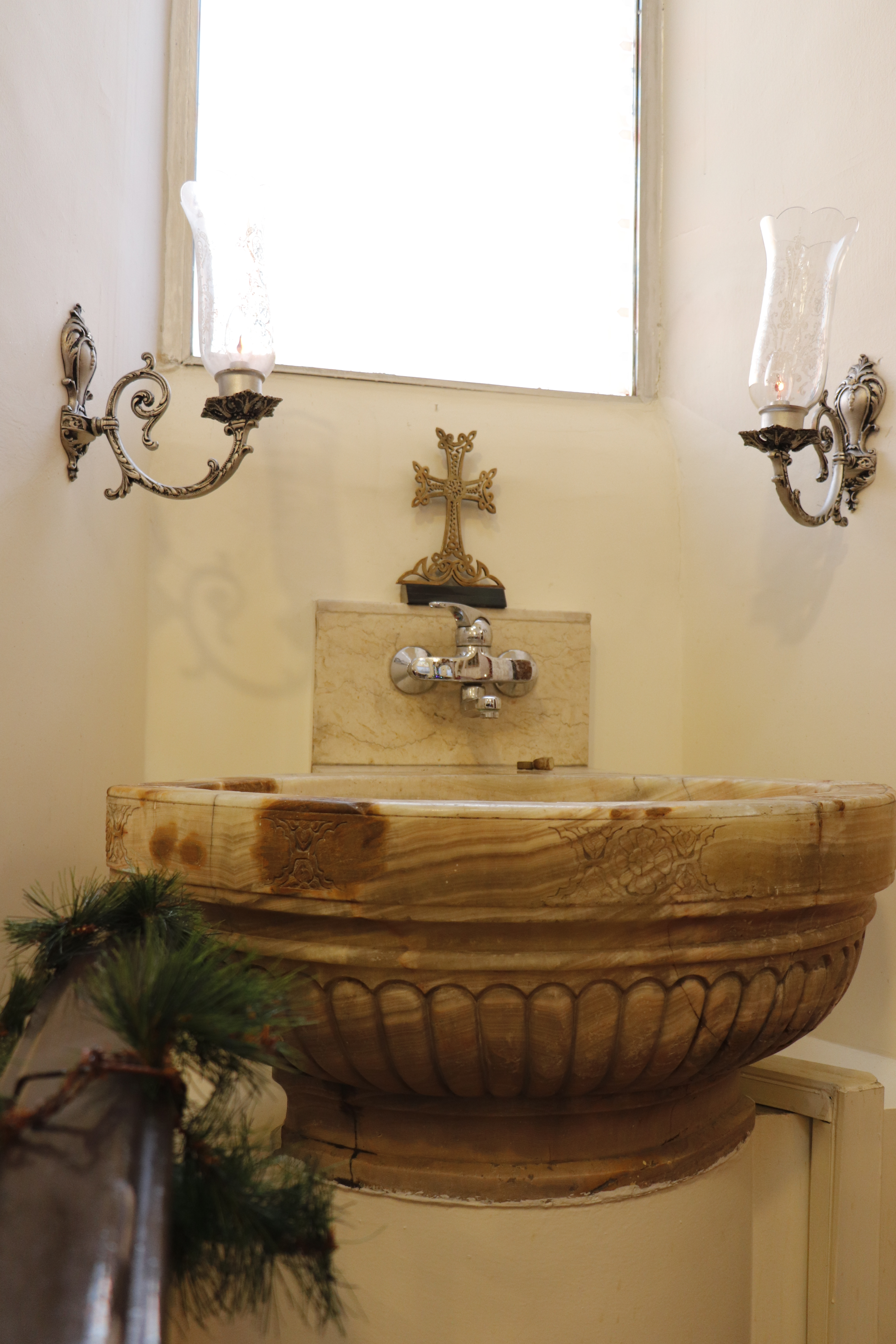

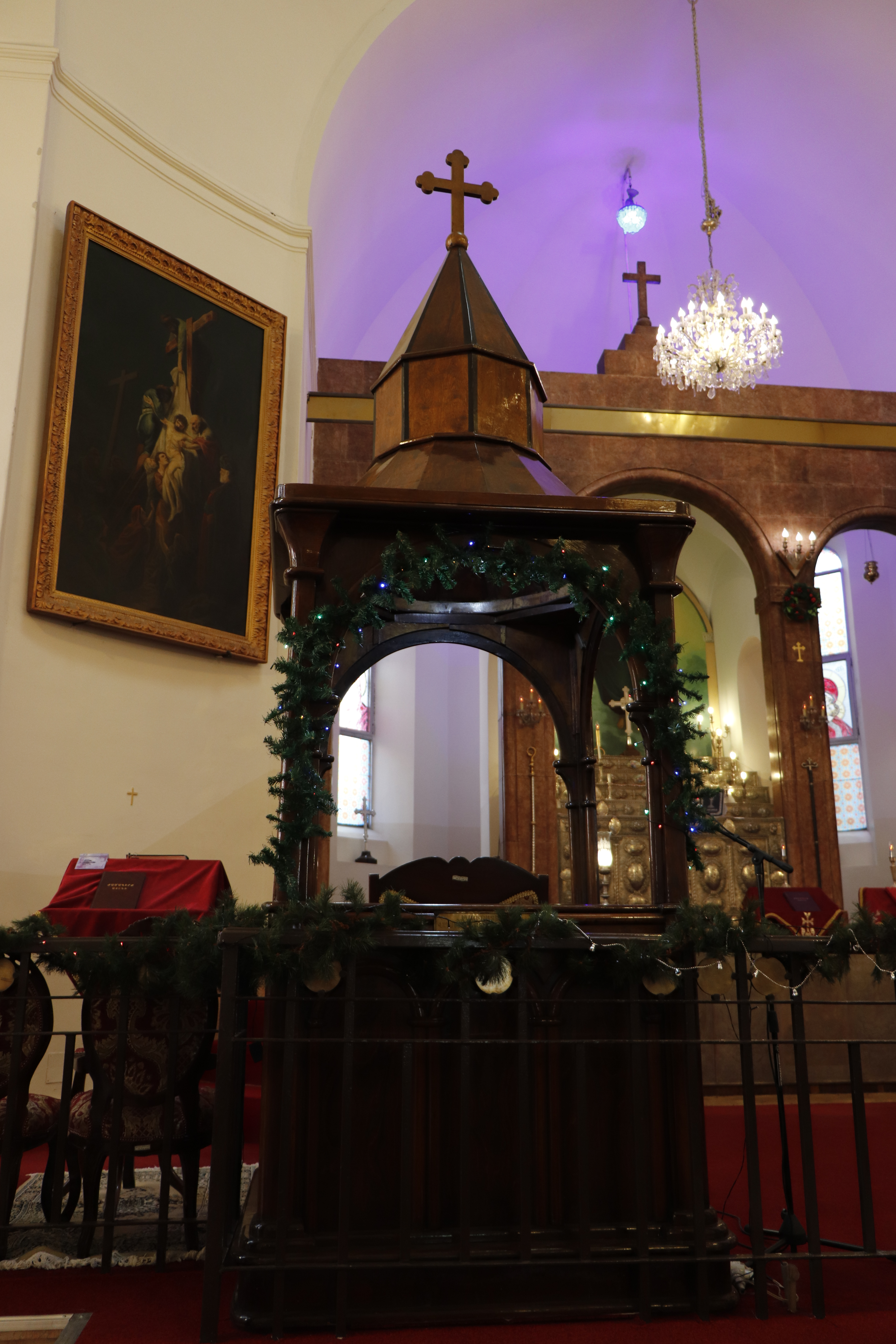

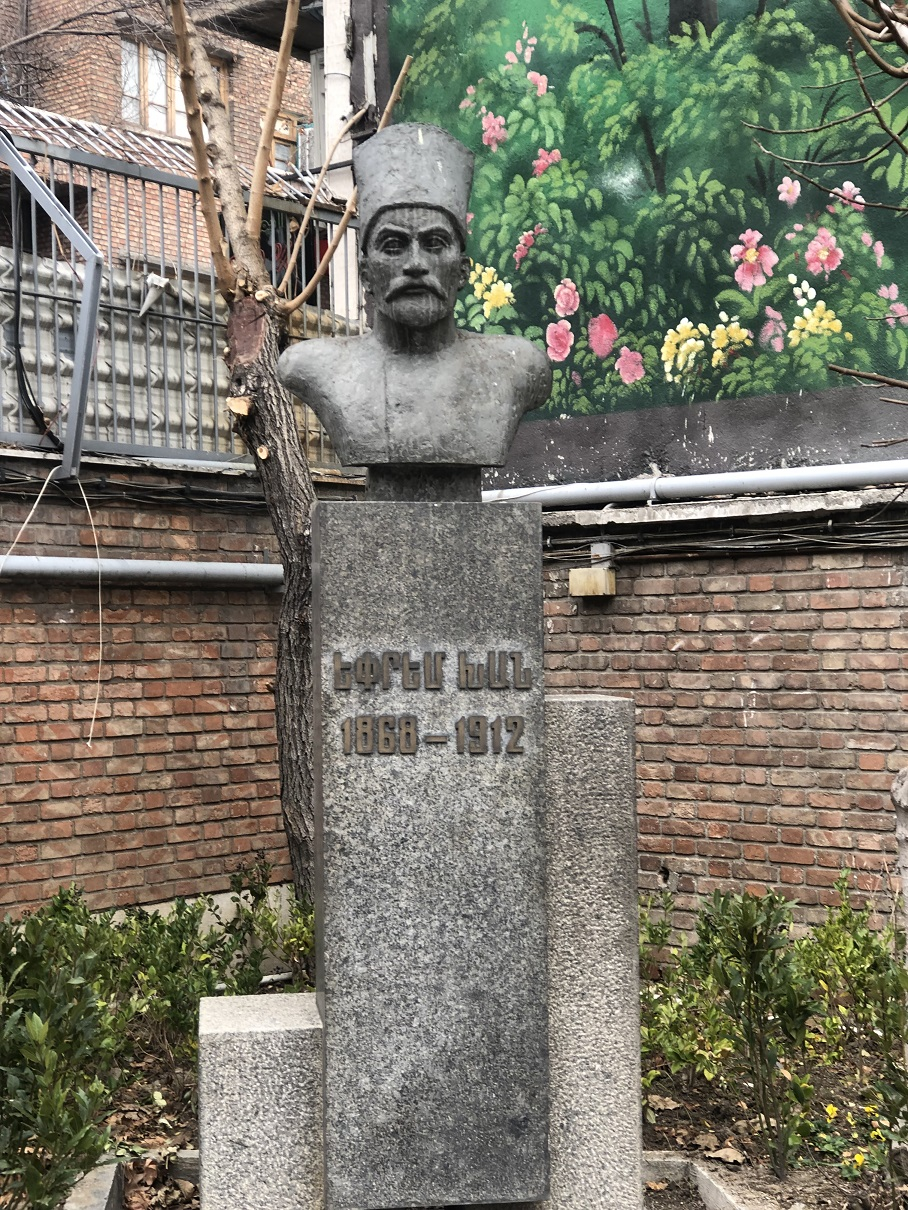
Grave of Yeprem Khan

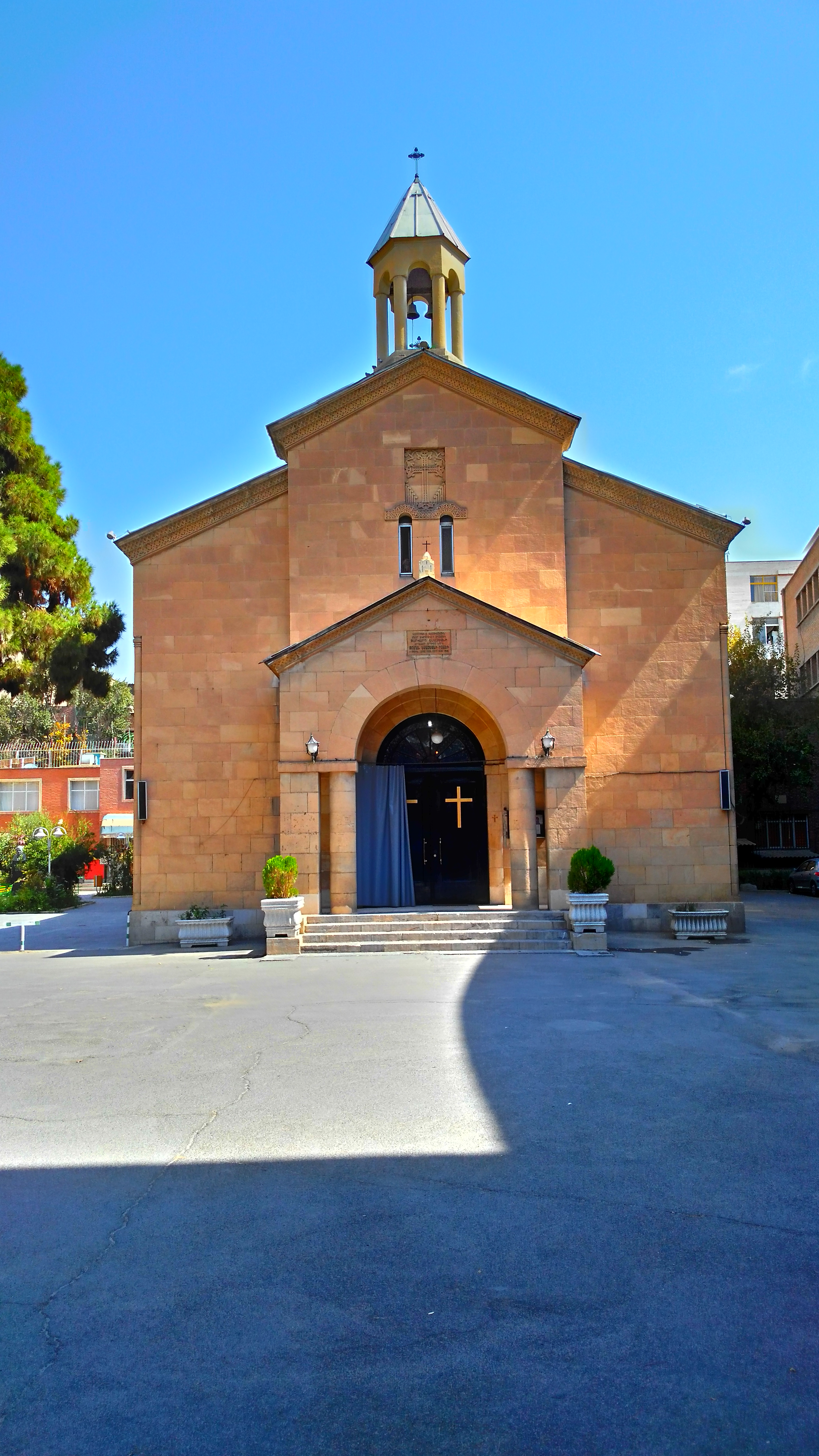
Outside view

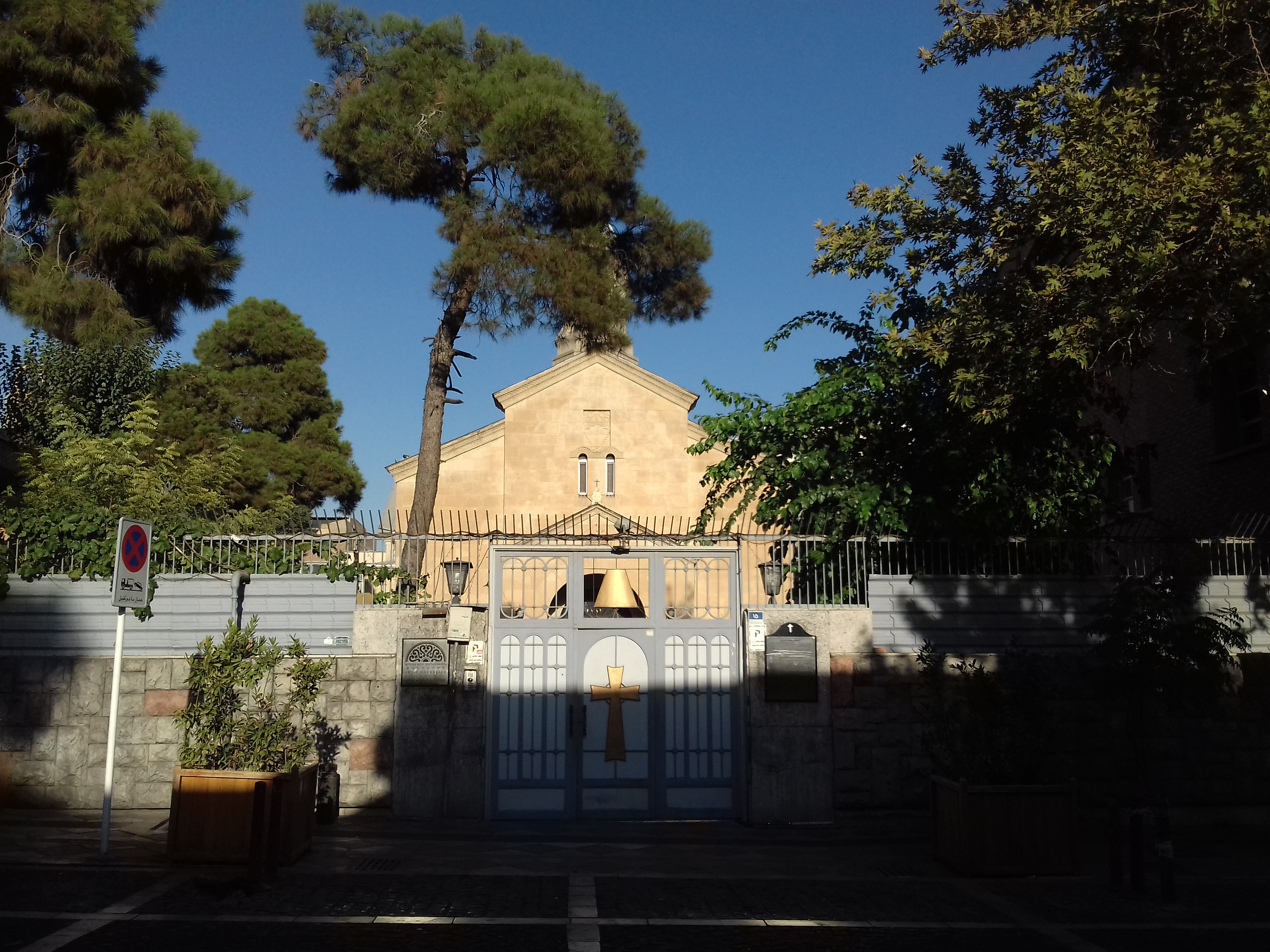
Church view from Mirza Kochak Khan street

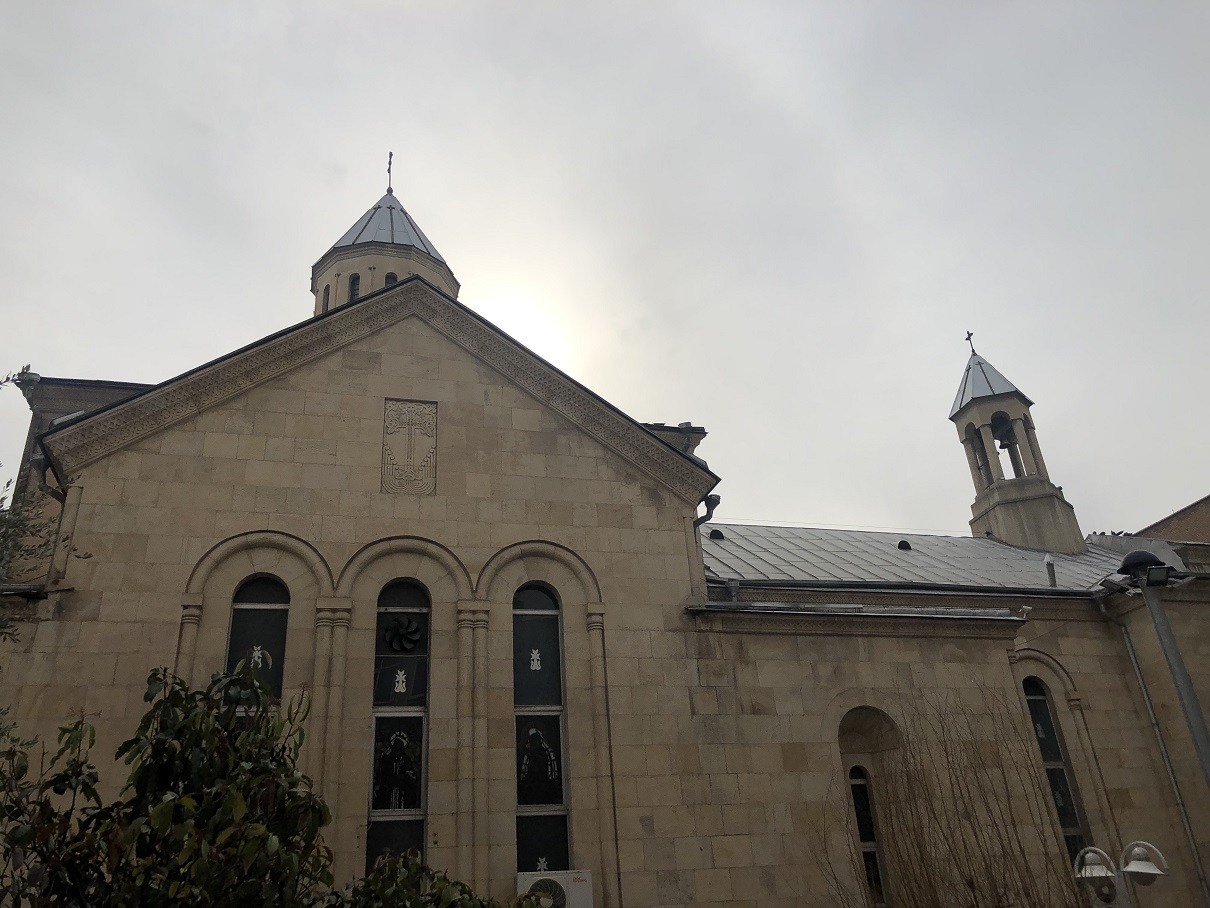

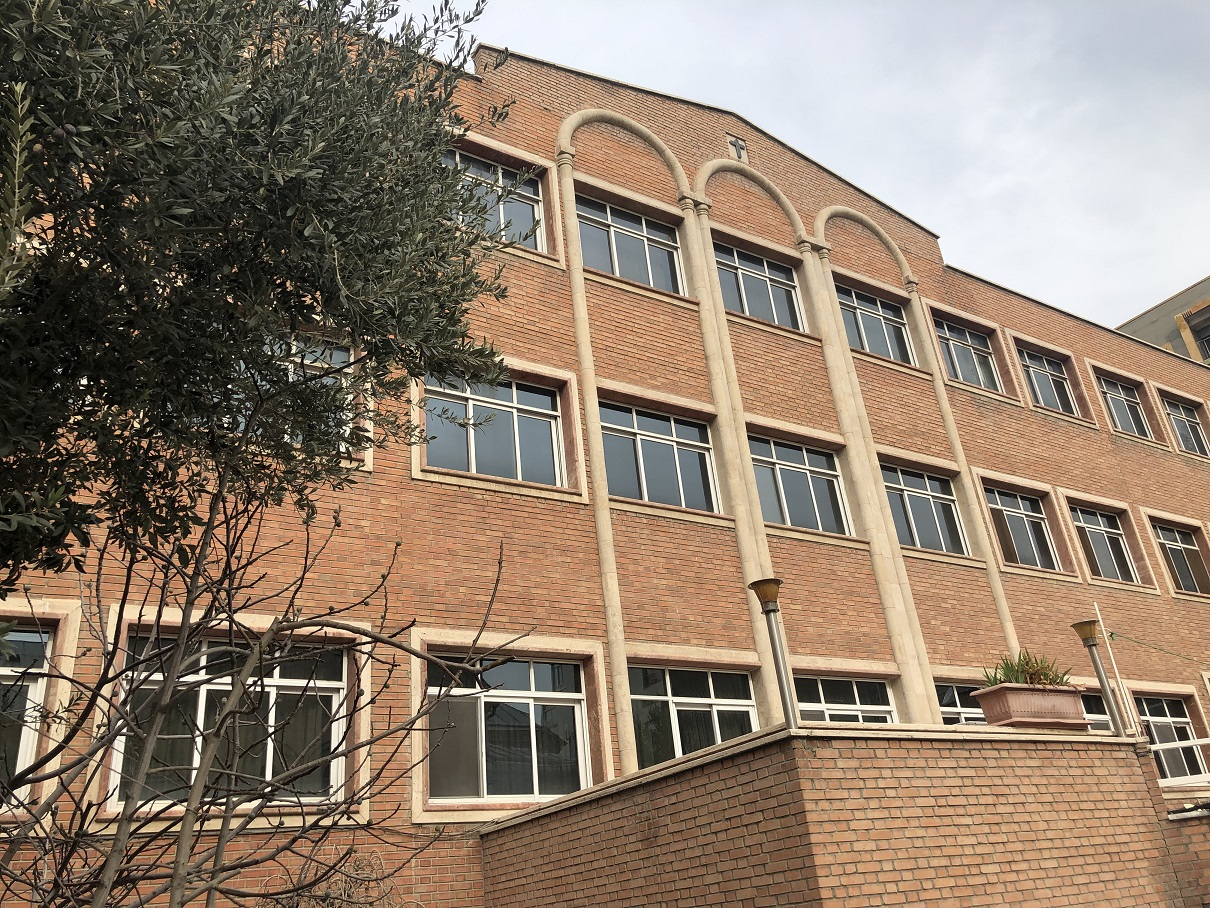
Museum

== See also ==
- Iranian Armenians
- List of Armenian churches in Iran

== Bibliography ==
- ویکتور دانیل، بیژن شافعی و سهراب سروشیانی، معماری نیکلای مارکُف (تهران: ۱۳۸۲)
  [Victor Daniel, Bijan Shafei and Sohrab Sarshiani, Nikolai Markov's Architecture. Tehran: 2003.]
- دانشنامهٔ تاریخ معماری ایرانشهر. سازمان میراث فرهنگی و گردشگری ایران.
  [Encyclopedia of the history of Iranshahr architecture. Cultural Heritage and Tourism Organization of Iran.]
