= List of grand viziers of Persia =

Grand Vizier of Iran
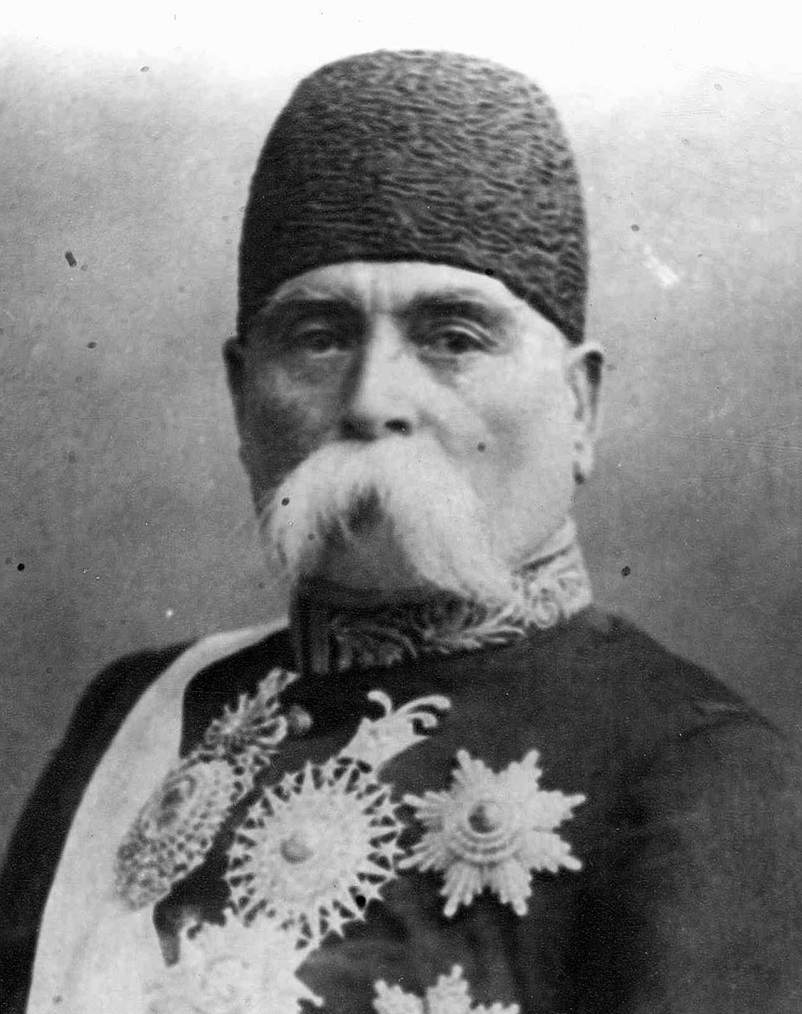
Abdol Majid Mirza, the last grand vizier (وزیر اعظم) of Iran from 1904 to 1906

The following is a list of the grand viziers of Persia (Iran) until 1906, when the office of Prime Minister of Iran was established following the Persian Constitutional Revolution. Although the office was officially known during the Qajar dynasty as Grand Vizier (Vazir-e A'zam, Persian: وزیر اعظم), various titles were used throughout different historical periods to describe the office, including Wuzurg Framadar, Vizier (Persian: وزیر), Sāheb-e Divān (Persian: صاحب‌دیوان), Vizier of the Supreme Court (Vazir-e Divān-e A'lā, Persian: وزیر دیوان اعلیٰ), Premier (Shakhs-e Avval, Persian: شخص اول) and Sadr-e A'zam (Persian: صدراعظم).

== Sasanian Dynasty (224–651) ==
- Abarsam (for Ardashir I)
- Khosrow-Yazdegerd (for Yazdegerd I)
- Mihr-Narseh (for Yazdegerd I and Bahram V)
- Suren Pahlav (for Bahram V)
- Bozorgmehr (for Kavad I and Khosrow I)
- Izadgushasp (for Khosrow I)
- Piruz Khosrow (for Kavadh II and Ardashir III)
- Mah-Adhur Gushnasp (for Ardashir III)
- Farrukh Hormizd (for Boran)

== Mongol Ilkhanate (1256–1335) ==
=== Ulugh Bitickhi ===
- Sayf ol-Din Bitikchi (?–1263) (for Hulagu Khan)

=== Saheb Divan ===
- Shams od-Din Joveyni (1263–1284) (Hulagu Khan, Abaqa Khan and Tekuder)

=== Vizier ===
- Bugha (1284–1289, for Arghun Khan)

=== Saheb Divan ===
- Sa'd od-Dowleh ol-Safi ibn Hibatollah (1289–1291) (for Arghun Khan)
- Sadr od-Din Ahmad Khaledi Zanjani (1292–1295) (for Gaykhatu)

=== Vizier ===
- Jamal ol-Din Ali Dastjerdani (1st time) (1295–1295) (for Baydu)
- Nawrūz (1295) (for Ghazan)
- Sharaf od-Din Mohammad Biabanaki Semnani (1295–1296) (for Ghazan)
- Jamal ol-Din Ali Dastjerdani (1296) (for Ghazan)
- Sadr ol-Din Ahmad Khaledi Zanjani (1296–1298) (for Ghazan)
- Sa'd od-Din Mohammad Avaji (1298–1312) (for Ghazan and Öljaitü)
- Rashid od-Din Hamadani (1298–1316) (for Ghazan and Öljaitü)
- Taj od-Din Ali-Shah Jilani (1312 – June 1324) (for Öljaitü and Abu Sa'id Bahador Khan)
- Ghias od-Din Mohammad Ali-Shahi (for Abu Sa'id Bahador Khan)
- Rokn od-Din Sa'en Fasavi (1324–?) (for Abu Sa'id Bahador Khan)
- Dimashq Khwāja (?–24 August 1327) (for Abu Sa'id Bahador Khan)
- Ghias od-Din Mohammad (for Abu Sa'id Bahador Khan and Arpa Ke'un)

== Safavid Dynasty ==
Vizier

- Amir Zakariya (1501–1507) and Mahmud Jan Daylami (1502/03–1507) (for Ismail I)
- Najm-e Sani (1507–1510) (for Ismail I)
- Mirak beg Daylami (?–?) (for Ismail I)
- Shah-mir Daylami (?–?) (for Ismail I)
- Mirza Shah Hossein (1514–15 April 1523) (for Ismail I)
- Jalal od-Din Mohammad Tabrizi (1523–1524) (for Ismail I and Tahmasp I)
- Qadi Jahan Qazvini (1st time) (1524–1525) (for Tahmasp I)
- Mirza Jafar Savaji (1525–1531) (for Tahmasp I)
- Ahmad Beg Nur Kamal (1531–1533/34) (for Tahmasp I)
- Sa'd od-Din Enayatollah Khuzani (1533–1535) and Mo'in-al-Din Yazdi (?–?) (for Tahmasp I)
- Qadi Jahan Qazvini (2nd time) (1535–1549) (for Tahmasp I)
- Ghias od-Din Ali Shirazi (?–?) (for Tahmasp I)
- Agha Mohammad Farahani (?–?) (for Tahmasp I)
- Jalal od-Din Amir-Beg Kujuji (?–?) (for Tahmasp I)
- Mirza Beg Sabeghi Abhari (?–?) (for Tahmasp I)
- Masum Beg Safavi (?–1568) (for Tahmasp I)
- Seraj od-Din Ali Qomi (1568–?) (for Tahmasp I)
- Jamal od-Din Ali Tabrizi and Seyyed Hassan Farahani (simultaneously 1573–?) (for Tahmasp I)
- Mirza Shokrollah Isfahani (1576–1577) (for Tahmasp I and Ismail II)

Grand Vizier (E'temad-od-Dowleh)

- Mirza Salman Jaberi (1577–1583) (for Ismail I and Mohammad Khodabanda)
- Mirza Hedayatollah (1583–1585) (for Mohammad Khodabanda)
- Mirza Mohammad Kermani (1585–1587) (for Mohammad Khodabanda)
- Mirza Shahvali Shirazi (1587–1589) (for Abbas I)
- Mirza Mohammad Kermani (2nd time) (1589) (for Abbas I)
- Mirza Lotfollah Shirazi (1589–1590) (for Abbas I)
- Hatem Beg Ordubadi (1590–1610) (for Abbas I)
- Mirza Taleb Khan Ordubadi (1610–1620) (for Abbas I)
- Salman Khan Ustajlu (1620–1623) (for Abbas I)
- Khalifeh Soltan (1st time) (1623–1631) (for Abbas I and Safi)
- Mirza Taleb Khan Ordubadi (2nd time) (1623–1634) (for Safi)
- Saru Taqi (1634–1644) (for Safi and Abbas II)
- Khalifeh Soltan (2nd time) (1644–1653) (for Abbas II)
- Mohammad Beg (1653–1661) (for Abbas II)
- Mirza Mohammad Karaki (1661–1669) (for Abbas II and Suleiman I)
- Shaykh Ali Khan Zanganeh (1669–1671) (for Suleiman I)

Vacant (1671–1672)

- Shaykh Ali Khan Zanganeh (2nd time) (1672–1688) (for Suleiman I)

Vacant (1688–1690)

- Mohammad Taher Vahid Qazvini (1690–1698) (for Suleiman of Persia and Soltan Hoseyn)
- Mohammad Mo'men Khan Shamlu (1699–1707) (for Soltan Hoseyn)
- Shahqoli Khan Zanganeh (1707–1716) (for Soltan Hoseyn)
- Fath-Ali Khan Daghestani (1716–1720) (for Soltan Hoseyn)
- Mohammad-Qoli Khan Shamlu (1721–1722) (for Soltan Hoseyn)
- Amanollah Khan (1722–1725) (for Mahmud Hotak)
- Zele Khan (1725–1727) (for Ashraf Hotak)
- Mohammad-Amin Khan (1727–1729) (for Ashraf Hotak)
- Rajab-Ali Khan (1729–1732) (for Tahmasp II)

Vacant (1732–1750)

- Zakariya Khan Kazzazi (June 1750–1751) (for Ismail III)
- Mohammad-Salim Khan Afshar (1751–1752?) (for Ismail III)
- Zakariya Khan Kazzazi (2nd time) (1752?–1756?) (for Ismail III)

== Zand Dynasty ==
- Mirza Aqil Alavi (1758?–1763) (for Karim Khan Zand)
- Mirza Jafar Isfahani (1763–1779) (for Karim Khan Zand)
- Mirza Rabi Isfahani (?–1785) (for Ali-Morad Khan Zand)
- Mirza Mohammad-Hossein Farahani (1785–?) (for Jafar Khan Zand and Lotf-Ali Khan Zand)

== Qajar Dynasty ==
| No. | Picture | Name | Title of office | Took office | Left office | Shah (monarch) |
|---|---|---|---|---|---|---|
| 1 | Hajji Ebrahim Shirazi | Hajji Ebrahim Shirazi | | November 1794 | 14 April 1801 | Agha Mohammad Khan Qajar |
| 1 | Hajji Ebrahim Shirazi | Hajji Ebrahim Shirazi | | November 1794 | 14 April 1801 | Fath-Ali Shah Qajar |
| 2 | Mirza Shafi Mazandarani | Mirza Shafi Mazandarani | Vazir-e A'zam (1801–1809); Sadr-e A'zam (1809–1819) | 14 April 1801 | 12 July 1819 | Fath-Ali Shah Qajar |
| 3 | Hajji Mohammad Hossein Khan | Hajji Mohammad Hossein Isfahani | Sadr-e A'zam | 1819 | 1823 | Fath-Ali Shah Qajar |
| 4 | Abdollah Khan Amin ol-Dowleh | Abdollah Khan Amin od-Dowleh (1st time) | ? | 1823 | 1825 | Fath-Ali Shah Qajar |
| 5 | Allahyar Khan Asaf-al-Dowleh | Asef od-Dowleh | Sadr-e A'zam | 1825 | 21 March 1828 | Fath-Ali Shah Qajar |
| 6 | Abdollah Khan Amin ol-Dowleh | Abdollah Khan Amin ol-Dowleh (2nd time) | ? | 21 March 1828 | 23 October 1834 | Fath-Ali Shah Qajar |
| 7 | Mirza Abu'l-Qasem Qa'em-Maqam | Abol-Qasem Qa'em-Maqam | ? | January 1835 | 26 June 1835 | Mohammad Shah Qajar |
| 8 | Haji Mirza Aqasi | Haji Mirza Aqasi | Shakhs-e Avval (Premier) | 1835 | 20 October 1848 | Mohammad Shah Qajar |
| 9 | Amir Kabir | Amir Kabir | Shakhs-e Avval (Premier) | 20 October 1848 | 13 November 1851 (executed) | Naser al-Din Shah Qajar |
| 10 | Mirza Aqa Khan Nuri | Mirza Aqa Khan Nuri | Sadr-e A'zam | November 1851 | 30 August 1858 | Naser al-Din Shah Qajar |
| 11 | Mirza Ja'far Khan Moshir-al-Dowleh | Jafar Khan Moshir od-Dowleh | Head of the State Council | 15 September 1858 | November/December 1862 | Naser al-Din Shah Qajar |
| — | The office was vacant. | | | November/December 1862 | 23 March 1865 | Naser al-Din Shah Qajar |
| 12 | Mirza Mohammad Khan Sepahsalar | Mirza Mohammad Khan Sepahsalar | ? | 23 March 1865 | 16 June 1866 | Naser al-Din Shah Qajar |
| — | The office was vacant. | | | 16 June 1866 | 14 October 1867 | Naser al-Din Shah Qajar |
| 13 | Mirza Yusuf Ashtiani | Mirza Yusuf Ashtiani | Ra'is-al-Vozarā (Prime minister or Chief minister); First minister (Vazir-e Avval) | 14 October 1867 | 13 November 1871 | Naser al-Din Shah Qajar |
| 14 | Mirza Hosein Khan Moshir od-Dowleh | Mirza Hosein Khan Sepahsalar | Sadr-e A'zam | 13 November 1871 | 14 September 1873 | Naser al-Din Shah Qajar |
| — | Since 1873 to 1878 Mirza Hosein Khan Moshir od-Dowleh (Minister of Foreign Affairs and War) and Mirza Yusuf Ashtiani (Minister of Interior Affairs and Treasury) acted together as Grand Vizier. Since 1878 Kamran Mirza Nayeb es-Saltaneh was added to this group of statesmen. | | | 1873 | 1880 | Naser al-Din Shah Qajar |
| — | Mirza Yusuf Ashtiani | Mirza Yusuf Ashtiani | Acting Sadr-e A'zam (After dismiss of Mirza Hosein Khan Moshir od-Dowleh on 1880, Mirza Yusef Ashtiani was in charge of Sadr-e A'zam affairs, however he was not called Sadr-e A'zam. On 24 June 1884, he officially became Sadr-e A'zam). | 1880 | 24 June 1884 | Naser al-Din Shah Qajar |
| 15 | Mirza Yusuf Ashtiani | Mirza Yusuf Ashtiani | Sadr-e A'zam | 24 June 1884 | 7 April 1886 | Naser al-Din Shah Qajar |
| — | Mirza Ali Asghar Khan Amin al-Soltan | Mirza Ali Asghar Khan Amin os-Soltan | Acting (Minister of Court) | 7 April 1886 | 1888 | Naser al-Din Shah Qajar |
| 16 | Mirza Ali Asghar Khan Amin al-Soltan | Mirza Ali Asghar Khan Amin os-Soltan | Grand Vizier (1888 – 25 January 1893); Sadr-e A'zam (25 January 1893 – 22 November 1896) | 1888 | 22 November 1896 | Naser al-Din Shah Qajar |
| 16 | Mirza Ali Asghar Khan Amin al-Soltan | Mirza Ali Asghar Khan Amin os-Soltan | Grand Vizier (1888 – 25 January 1893); Sadr-e A'zam (25 January 1893 – 22 November 1896) | 1888 | 22 November 1896 | Mozaffar ad-Din Shah Qajar |
| — | The office was vacant. | | | 22 November 1896 | 6 April 1897 | Mozaffar ad-Din Shah Qajar |
| 17 | Mirza Ali Khan Amin-al-Dowleh | Mirza Ali Khan Amin od-Dowleh | Ra'is-al-Vozarā (Prime minister or Chief minister) (6 April 1897 – 7 August 1897); Grand Vizier (7 August 1897 – November/December 1897); Sadr-e A'zam (November/December 1897 – 5 June 1898) | 6 April 1897 | 5 June 1898 | Mozaffar ad-Din Shah Qajar |
| 18 | Mirza Mohsen Khan Moshir-al-Dowleh | Mirza Mohsen Khan Moshir od-Dowleh | Ra'is-al-Vozarā (prime minister or chief minister)/Head of the State Council | 5 June 1898 | 11 August 1898 | Mozaffar ad-Din Shah Qajar |
| 19 | Mirza Ali Asghar Khan Amin al-Soltan | Mirza Ali Asghar Khan Amin os-Soltan | Sadr-e A'zam | 11 August 1898 | 15 September 1903 | Mozaffar ad-Din Shah Qajar |
| — | The office was vacant. | | | 15 September 1903 | 23 January 1904 | Mozaffar ad-Din Shah Qajar |
| 20 | Abdol Majid Mirza | Abdol Majid Mirza | Grand Vizier (23 January 1904 – 26 August 1904); Sadr-e A'zam (26 August 1904 – 29 July 1906) | 23 January 1904 | 29 July 1906 | Mozaffar ad-Din Shah Qajar |
| 21 | Mirza Nasrollah Khan Moshir-al-Dowleh | Mirza Nasrollah Khan | Ra'is-al-Vozarā (prime minister or chief minister) (30 July 1906 – 1 August 1906); Sadr-e A'zam (1 August 1906 – 7 March 1907) | 30 July 1906 | 7 March 1907 | Mozaffar ad-Din Shah Qajar |

== See also ==
- List of prime ministers of Iran
- Persian name
- Prime Minister of Iran
- Vizier
- History of the parliament in Iran
- Board of Directors of the Islamic Consultative Assembly
- Women in the Parliament of Iran

== Sources ==
- Chaumont, Marie-Louise (2000). "FRAMADĀR". Encyclopaedia Iranica, Vol. X, Fasc. 2. pp. 125–126.
- For a full list of Viziers of Iran in the last 2000 years, see: "Iranian Viziers: From Bozorgmehr to Amir Kabir" (وزیران ایرانی از بزرگمهر تا امیر کبیر) by Abdolrafi' Haqiqat (عبدالرفیع حقیقت). Perry–Castañeda Library collection DS 271 F34 1995
- Mohammad Taghi Bahar, Taarikh-e Mokhtasar-e Ahzaab-e Siaasi-e Iraan (A Short History of Political Parties of Iran), Amirkabir, 1978.
- Encyclopædia Iranica Online, available at www.iranica.com
- The Persian Encyclopedia
