= Tansar =

Tansar (Persian: تنسر) was a Zoroastrian Herbadan Herbad (Chief judge) in late Parthian Empire And one of the supporters of Ardashir I. Tansar was apparently a Parthian aristocrat, but he turned to Neoplatonic beliefs. Then he joined Ardashir I and became Herbadan Herbad during his reign. He was commissioned to collect the Avesta and died on an unknown date. Tansar's great work is his letter to Goshnasb, which is one of the most important writings in the collection of Middle Persian literature, which provides valuable information about the social and administrative organization of Iran during the Sassanid period.

== Name ==
The name of this Zoroastrian cleric is mentioned in most of the reports of the Islamic period of "Tansar", but other forms such as "Tanshar", "Banshar", "Bishar", "Yanshar", "Tabsar" and "Bansar" can also be seen. Also, the name of Tansar, as a result of the characteristic of the alphabet of the Pahlavi script, can be read in various forms such as "Tansar", "Tousar" and "Dosar". In The Meadows of Gold, al-Mas'udi called the beginning of the Sassanid period "Tansar" and in his other book, At-Tanbih wa-l-'Ishraf, he called him "Dushar" or "Dusar". Miskawayh and Ibn Isfandiyar have given the only known form of "Tansar" and al-Biruni in Alberuni's India has given the Middle Persian form of "Tusar".

The change of the name Tusar to Tansar seems to have been the result of a misreading of a book written in the Pahlavi script, in which there is only one sign for the two letters "v" and "n". According to Christensen, if Ibn al-Muqaffa' had called the name Tusar in the Pahlavi text of Letter of Tansar into Arabic, this pronunciation should have been seen in Ibn Isfandiyar's Persian translation instead of Tansar. Hence, Biruni, who called him "Tusar, Herbadan Herbad", must have taken it from the Pahlavi text of Letter of Tansar or another Pahlavi source, not from the Arabic translation of Ibn Muqaffa'. With the recognition of Shapur I's inscription at the Ka'ba-ye Zartosht, it became clear that the correct form of the name in the Sassanid period and in Middle Persian was "Tusar". According to Shapur, one of the companions of his father Ardeshir Babakan's court was a man named "Mehrag Tusargan" (in Middle Persian: mtrk ZY twslk'n; in Parthian: mtrk twsrkn; in Greek: Μεερικ τόνσσεριγαν). Because there is a separate sign for the letter "v" in the side of the inscription, this inscription shows that the correct form of the name was "Tousar". Today, most scholars cite the traditional form of Tansar in their writings, and as Mary Boyce points out, changing it to Tusar is of little use.

=== Etymology ===
The first etymology of this name is in the Letter of Tansar itself, which is a completely slang etymology in connection with the pronunciation of the name Tansar. In his introduction, Ibn Muqaffa says in the language of Bahram Khorzad: "He was called Tansar because all his limbs were so hairy and his whole body was like a horse's head." In a futile attempt to justify this folk etymology, James Darmesteter argued that the word tensor in Middle Persian was pronounced with the accentuation of the letter nun, meaning Tannsar, and was taken from the form "tanu.varəs" meaning "hairy body". Hence, Darmesteter referred to him as "Tannsar" in his translation of Letter of Tansar. Some scholars all agreed with Darmesteter, but Christensen rejected this view and rightly called it a futile attempt to justify a popular etymology. Beck derives its name from the ancient Persian form "tusa-sarā (ka) kāna-" and the first part of it is derived from the Avestan word "tausa" "with a fat thigh", with the suffix "sara-" and superficial, meaning "living together". Genio calls it a derogation from the name "Tus", and from the ancient Persian form "tau-sa-ra" or "tusara", but it does not give a meaning to it and only in the translation of the word Tus, it is equal to the name "tusāspa" The meaning of "the owner of a group of horses". Philip Huyse also considers it to be a derivation of "tusa-sara" or "taus-ara", the diminutive of "taus" and the diminutive suffix "ar". Ginio and Huyse trace the origin of Tus, like Mayrhofer, from the Vedic form "tuś / toś" "squeezing, rushing, pouring, giving, pleasing."

== Background ==
According to Letter of Tansar, this letter was written by Tansar, Herbadan Herbad in the time of Ardeshir I, in response to Goshnasb, the king of Tabarestan and Padishkhwargar, Daylaman, Ruyan and Damavand, who looked with concern at some of the activities of Ardashir I And he refused to obey him, and Tansar sought to answer his questions and concerns.

The oldest known record of Tansar and his activities is the Middle Persian text of Denkard, compiled in the tenth century by Aturfarnbag-i Farruxzatan and Adurbad-i Emedan. Denkard identifies this Zoroastrian cleric as "Herbad" or "Herbadan Herbad" of the period of Ardeshir I and praises him with characteristics such as "Right Order", "Pious Puriotkish", and "Heavenly Sardar and devotee eloquence". It is also reported that Tensor, at the suggestion of Ardashir I, compiled scattered Avestan sacred texts.

third book of Denkard states:

"That lord, Ardeshir Shahnshah, the son of Babak, came to re-adorn the kingdom of Iran, and this writing was collected from the scattering of one, and Puriotkish Tansar, who was Herbad, came out and weighed it with the interpretation of Avesta, and said that based on this interpretation, it should be joined together And he did so."

in fourth book of Denkard states:

"The lord, Ardeshir Shahnashah, the son of Babak, with the guidance of Tansar, gathered all the religious teachings that were scattered in the court. Tansar came out, accepted it, and chose the more correct ones, leaving out the other sections, and thus commanded: From now on, only the correct ones are the correct interpretations based on the Mazdayasna, because now there is no lack of knowledge about them."

Apart from Denkard, some other historical reports have also dealt with Tensor and his activities. First of all, Al-Masoudi, in The Meadows of Gold, talks about Tensor's friendship with Ardeshir I and calls him one of the ascetics and princes of Iran and Platonism and a follower of the ideas of Socrates and Plato. In his other book, At-Tanbih wa-l-'Ishraf, he says that Tansar, the priest of Ardashir I, who was also called "Dosar or Dusher", was a Platonic man and a remnant of the Parthian feudal system and had lands inherited from his father. Tansar had sent representatives to various lands of Iran to inform the Iranian people about the uprising of Ardeshir I, and with his efforts, he had prepared the ground for the reign of Ardashir and the destruction of all the monarchies. Al-Mas'udi also says that Tensor had written good writings on monarchical and religious policies, in which he discussed Ardashir's activities and the justifications for his innovations in the field of religion and monarchy. Al-Mas'udi also says that Tansar had written good writings on monarchical and religious policies, in which he discussed Ardashir's activities and the justifications for his innovations in the field of religion and monarchy. One of these writings was his letter to Goshnasb, the ruler of Damavand, Rey, Tabarestan, Deylam and Gilan mountains, and the other was Letter of Tansar to the king of India. Miskawayh reports in Tajar al-Ummah that Ardashir I used the wise advice of a pious Herbad called Tansar to organize the Persian kingdom and destroy the kings of the tribes. In Albiruni's India, al-Biruni quotes from the letter "Tusar, Herbadan Herbad" to the king of Padishkhwargar, in which he responded to his criticism of Ardashir I. In Fars-Nama, Ibn al-Balkhi called the minister of Ardashir I a wise man named Tsar and said that Ardashir I did all his work according to his advice and strategy.

These reports testify that Tansar was one of the strongest Zoroastrian theologians in the early years of the Sassanid Empire. In the Letter of Tansar itself, he says that he lived piously for fifty years before the rise of Ardashir I and tried to preserve Zoroastrianism.

== Tansar and Kartir ==
In the historical reports and religious writings of the Sassanid period, there is no mention of the name of Tansar, and in Shapur I's inscription at the Ka'ba-ye Zartosht, no religious figure is mentioned in the list of the names of the courtiers of Ardashir I. Hence, because the name of Tansar, with all its greatness and special glory, is not found in any of the inscriptions of the Sassanid period in Zoroastrian literary and religious writings; On the other hand, Kartir's name appears only in his own inscriptions and in the inscriptions of Shapur I and in Manichaean reports; Some scholars have equated Tansar and Kartir.

First of all, it was Hertzfeld who considered these two historical figures to be one. Martin Sprengling, who translated Kartir's inscriptions before others, recognized the two and believed that what Denkard had to say about Tansar's religious activities was a report of Kartir's religious activities, which he addressed in his inscriptions. Vladimir Lukonin also simply considered Tansar as a mythical figure and Letter of Tansar as a work by Zoroastrian priests in the sixth century AD. Nevertheless, Mary Boyce, with logical reasoning, recognized Tansar and Kartir as two separate historical figures. Referring to the anonymous heterogeneity of the two, he made it clear that Kartir and Tensor are both special letters, as in the inscription of Shapur I, in addition to "Kartir Herbad", the two names "Kartir son of Ardavan" and "Mehrag son of Tusar" They are also seen to indicate the existence of the letters of Kartir and Tusar at the beginning of the Sassanid period. Boyce also noted that the period of life and religious activities of Tansar and Kartir are not the same because of the various historical sources and the Letter of Tansar itself; He lived during the reign of Ardeshir I and the peak of his activities and strength was during the reign of Ardeshir I, but it is clear from the theme of Kartir inscriptions that he must have been very young during the reign of Ardeshir I and the peak of his strength and activities was during the reign of Bahram II. Boyce, on the other hand, argued that the context of Tansar and Kartir's activities and achievements were completely inconsistent. In the history of Zoroastrianism, the name of Tansar is always seen in connection with his efforts in collecting Zoroastrian sacred texts and providing a standard text of the Avesta and maintaining it; But in his inscriptions, Kartir makes no mention of himself doing such things, and in general, Kartir and Tansar must be recognized as two separate historical figures.

== Tansar and Abarsam ==
According to Ibn Balkhi, Ardashir I had a minister named "Tsar" and he did all his work according to his opinion and strategy. Nicholson and Guy Le Strange, in correcting the text of Ibn Balkhi's Persian letter, considered "Tsar" to be a modified form of the word "Barsam", which Al-Tabari referred to as "Abrasam" in the report of the reign of Ardashir I. In the inscription of Shapur I, Abarsam is mentioned in the list of Companions of the court of Ardashir I, in the 15th place, and he is the only one who has received the glorious title of "Ardeshir Farr" (holder of Khvarenah of Ardeshir). The similarity in the morphs of Abarsam and Tansar in some historical sources has led to the idea that Tansar and Abarsam may be the same; But Christensen points out that the spelling of the two names is very different in the Pahlavi script, as well as in the Arabic and Persian scripts; Al-Tabari, on the other hand, in one of his reports called Absam the Wuzurg framadar of Ardashir I, and in another report he called him "Harjand", which clearly shows the inaccuracy of this belief. As a result, in the sources, the similarities between Hargbaz and Herbad, has led to fusion of Hargbaz Abarsam and Herbad Tansar.

== Letter of Tansar ==
Letter of Tansar is a collection of letters between Tansar and the king of Mazandaran and its suburbs, Goshnasb. The Pahlavi text of Letter of Tansar was translated into Arabic by Rōzbih pūr-i Dādōē (Ibn al-Muqaffa') in the first half of the second century AH. In the introduction to the translation of Tensor's letter, he says that the basis of his translation was the report of "Bahram Ibn Khorzad and he was from his father Manouchehr Mubad Khorasan and one of the Persian scholars". However, this chain of letters is a bit vague and may have been: Bahram son of Khorzad, and Khorzad son of Manouchehr, the priest of Khorasan and one of the scholars of Persia. Ibn Muqaffa's preface and the text of Letter of Tansar reveal that Ibn Muqaffa had in his hands a Pahlavi text compiled by Bahram son of Khorzad, and in translating it into Arabic, he added the preface and some new speeches such as the story of Kelileh and Dahman; In an attempt to remove the Zoroastrian theme of this letter in order to be accepted in the Islamic society, passages from the Torah and the Bible have been included in the margins of the text of the letter. Today, the Pahlavi text as well as the Arabic translation of Letter of Tansar have been lost and may have been destroyed forever, and nearly five centuries after the death of Ibn Muqaffa, the text of his Arabic translation was translated into Persian.

== Sources ==
- Tafazzoli, Ahmad (1996). "Harzbad in Ferdowsi's Shahnameh; One of the unknown positions of the Sassanid era". Nama-i farhangistan.
- Tafazzoli, Ahmad (1998). Pre-Islamic Persian Literature. Tehran: Sokhan.
- Jamalzadeh, Mohammad-Ali (1912). "A letter from the Sassanid era: Letter of Tansar". Kaveh.
- Jalilian, Shahram (2018). letter of Tansar to Gushnasp (historical preface, Tansar's biography and history of his letter, text, notes, glossary). Ahvaz: Martyr Chamran University Press. ISBN 978-600-141-208-0.
- Oryan, Saeed (2004). Guide to Middle Persian Inscriptions (Pahlavi-Parthian). Tehran: Ministry of Cultural Heritage, Tourism and Handicrafts.
- Christensen, Arthur (1939). Sassanid Persia. London: Cambridge University Press.
- Lukonin, Vladimir (1971). Persia II: From the Seleucids to the Sassanids. Barrie & Jenkins. ISBN 9780214653209.
- Minovi, Mojtaba (1976). letter of Tansar to Gushnasp. Tehran: Kharazmi Publications.
- Nasrollahzadeh, Sirus (2006). The Sassanid genealogy from the beginning to Hormizd II. Tehran: Ministry of Cultural Heritage, Tourism and Handicrafts.
- Herzfeld, Ernst (1935). Archaeological History of Iran. British Academy.
- Boyce, Mary (1968). The Letter of Tansar. Roma: Instituto Italiano Per Il Medio Ed Estremo Oriente.
- Christensen, Arthur (1932). "Abarsam et Tansar". Acta Orientalia Academiae Scientiarum Hungaricae. Vol. 10.
- Sprengling, Martin (1953). Third Century Iran; Sapor and Kartir. Chicago: University of Chicago Press.
