= Amin al-Dawla =

Amīn al-Dawla (Arabic: امین‌ الدوله, lit. 'Trustee of the Dynasty/State') is an Arabic honorific title. The Persian romanization of the word is often spelled as Amin ol-Dowleh, Amin od-Dowleh and Amin al-Dowleh. It may refer to:

- al-Hasan ibn Ammar (fl. 962–997), Fatimid commander and chief minister
- Ibn al-Tilmīdh (1073–1165), Syriac Christian physician and scholar in the Abbasid court
- Hajji Mohammad Hossein Isfahani (1758–1823), Iranian Grand Vizier under Fath-Ali Shah Qajar
- Abdollah Khan Amin ol-Dowleh (1779–1847), Iranian minister of finance and prime minister under Fath-Ali Shah Qajar
- Farrokh Khan (1812–1871), Iranian official and ambassador to Napoleon III and Queen Victoria
