= Abarsam =

Official of Ardashir I in Sasanian Iran

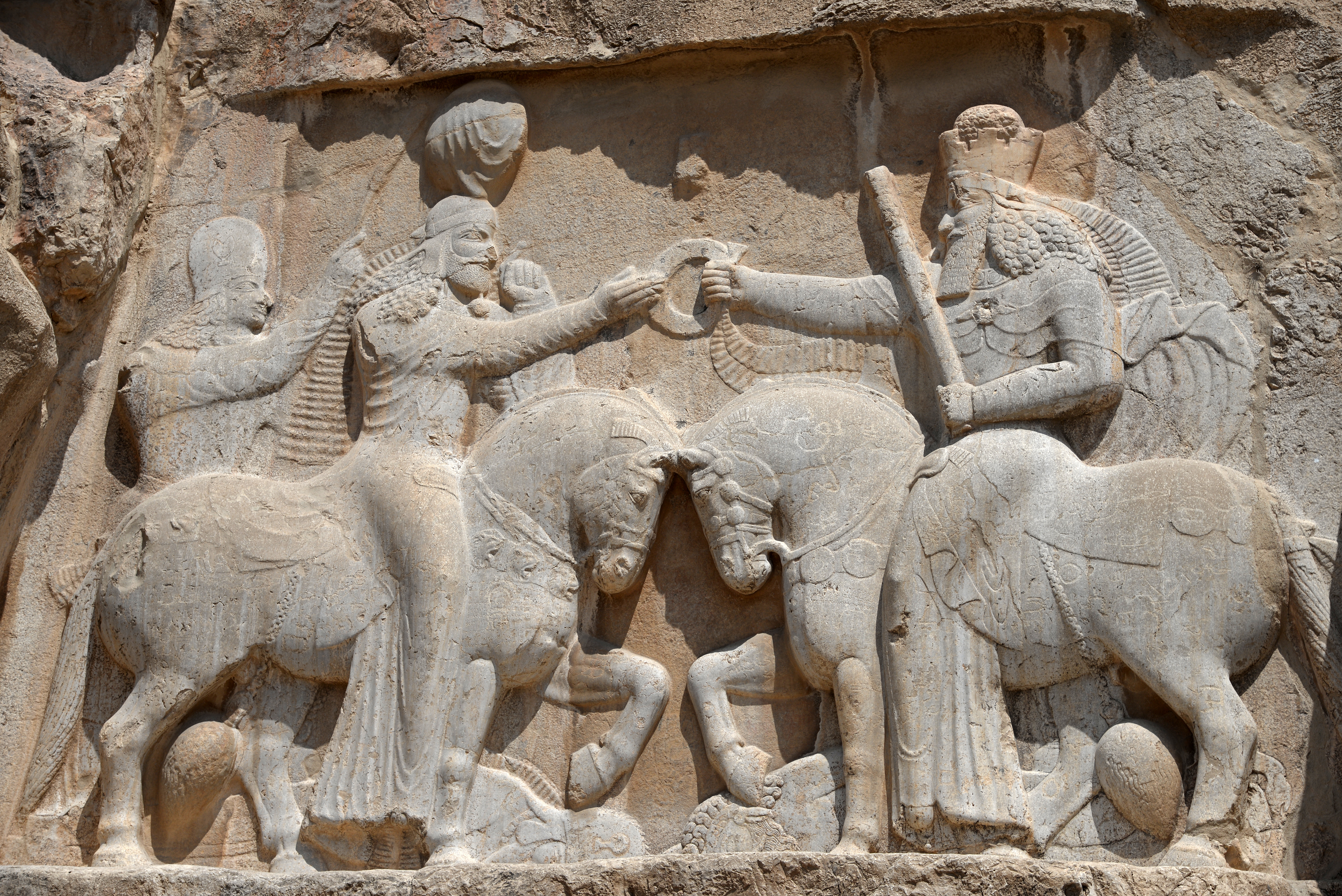
Rock relief of Ardashir I receiving the ring of kingship by the Zoroastrian supreme god Ahura Mazda. The figure behind Ardashir I has been suggested to be Abarsam.

Abarsam (Middle Persian: Apursām) was a high-ranking officer in Sasanian Iran, who served as the minister (wuzurg framadar) of king Ardashir I (r. 224–242). He is mentioned in the great inscription of Shapur, in the Nihayat al-arab, as well as in the writings of al-Tabari and of Abu Hanifa Dinawari.

== Biography ==
Abarsam is described as being a high-ranking eunuch in the Sassanid court in many sources. Arthur Christiansen alternatively suggests that he "may have been the famous Zoroastrian priest, Tansar", relying on the titles provided by al-Tabari. Ehsan Yarshater argues against this, stating that the great inscription of Shapur I does not describe Abarsam as being identical to Tansar, which according to Yarshater, disproves Christiansen's earlier suggestion. Yarshater also states that Abarsam must have been an early supporter of king Ardashir I during his rise to power. Abarsam may have either been from or had his center of power in Artaxshatr-farr.

The exact position Abarsam had in the Sassanid court is uncertain. He is described by al-Tabari as holding the positions of wuzurg framadar and harǰabad, but these titles are not mentioned in The Great Inscription of Shapur I. Yarshater states that this discrepancy indicates that the attribution of these titles to Abarsam must have been a later development. Yarshater also states that Abarsam could not have possibly been the grand vizier of Ardashir I, since that position was occupied by Papak under Ardashir I's reign, despite the fact that Abarsam is called the grand vizier by al-Tabari.

Various different stories about Abarsam's tenure exist. Al-Tabari describes Abarsam as first rising to the position of wuzurg framadar when Ardashir I conquered Estakr, and states that Abarsam defeated the king of Ahvaz, who was sent by the last Parthian king Artabanus IV to fight the Sassanids. Al-Tabari and Abu Hanifa Dinawari both state that Ardashir I once discovered that one of his wives was of Arsacid descent. Ardashir I is thus said to have ordered her to be executed, but Abarsam decided to let her live after finding out that she was pregnant. After this, Abarsam is said to have cut off his manhood to store in a box, so that he may provide it as proof of his chastity if necessary. Abarsam then said to have raised the child of the Arsacid woman, the young Shapur I, in secret before presenting him to Ardashir an opportune moment. Yarshater describes this story as having been made with the purpose of providing Shapur I with a royal descent.

The Nihayat al-arab and Dinawari recount another story about Abarsam, one which Yarshater describes as being anachronistic. These sources describe Abarsam as having been approached by a Christian apostle, who spoke the Gospel to Abarsam. Dinawari states that after this, Abarsam informed Ardashir about this, resulting in the king converting to Christianity. Dinawari states that Ardashir afterwards abandoned Christianity returned to Zoroastrianism after facing opposition from his fellow Persians, however.

== Sources ==
- Yarshater, E. (1982). "Abarsām". Encyclopaedia Iranica, Vol. I, Fasc. 1. pp. 67–68.
- Shavarebi, Ehsan (2017). "The so-called 'Thronfolgerprägungen' of Ardashīr I reconsidered". pp. 627–630.
