= Mirza Mohammad Khan Sinaki Lavasani =

Iranian diplomat and official (1809–1881)

- محمد خان سینکی لواسانی
- Illustration by Mirza Abdol'mottaleb Nakkash-Bashi, dated 1884–1885

Personal details
- Born: 1809 Sinak, Lavasanat, Iran
- Died: 4 November 1881 (aged 71–72) Tahran, Iran
- Resting place: Shah Abdol-Azim Shrine
- Children: 6, including, Mirza Ali Khan Amin od-Dowleh
- Parent: Fath-Ali Beg Lavasani (father)
- Occupation: Diplomat, official, scholar
- Awards: Order of the Lion and the Sun

Mirza Mohammad Khan Sinaki Lavasani (Persian: میرزا محمد خان سینکی لواسانی; 1809 – 4 November 1881) was a Qajar era diplomat, official and scholar, who served in the Ministry of Foreign Affairs from 1851 to 1871.

== Background ==
Mirza Mohammad Khan's paternal grandfather, Baba Khan, was a warlord who controlled territories roughly the village of Sinak in Lavasanat District, northeast of Tehran, to vicinity of Nur district in Mazandaran province, which has been in control of powerful warlord Khajeh Nouri family. In armed conflict between Agha Mohammad Khan Qajar and the nearly collapsed Zand Iran, Baba Khan sided with Qajar claimant to throne. It appears Baba Khan's subsequent insubordination to Agha Mohammad Khan's successor Fath-Ali Shah Qajar, resulted in Baba Khan's dispossession as local warlord. Mirza Mohammad Khan's father, Fath-Ali Beg Lavasani, was retained in Qajar service. Mirza Mohammad Khan's mother was a sister of Mirza Aqa Khan Nuri, the Grand vizier of Naser al-Din Shah.

== Career ==
=== Early career ===
Mirza Mohammad Khan received a traditional education at home, being fond of classical Persian poetry, literature and excelling in calligraphy, eloquent prose composition skills, he continually refined and which also proved advantageous in securing various official posts later in life. He began his professional career as chief librarian of Qahraman Mirza, one of sons of Crown prince Abbas Mirza in Tabriz; other sources maintain it was his father, Fath-Ali Beg held this post.

By 1846, When Mirza Mohammad Khan was living in Tehran and serving as Steward to Malek Jahan Khanom, the consort of Mohammad Shah Qajar. Following Mohammad Shah's death and accession of Naser al-Din Shah in 1848, Mirza Mohammad Khan accompanied Malek Jahan Khanom, on a pilgrimage to Mecca. After completing Hajj, Mirza Mohammad Khan was addressed as Haj Mirza Mohammad Khan.

=== Service in Ministry of Foreign Affairs ===
Following the appointment of Mirza Mohammad Khan's maternal uncle, Mirza Aqa Khan Nuri, as grand vizier in 1851, Mirza Mohammad Khan entered to service in Ministry of Foreign Affairs. His first diplomatic post was consul in Russian city of Astrakhan. On 3 October 1852, Mirza Mohammad Khan was awarded Robe of honour for his excellent works. In October of the following year, he was elevated to the post of first secretary, or first deputy at Ministry of Foreign Affairs. As first secretary in the Ministry of Foreign Affairs, Mirza Mohammad Khan was dispatched in late 1853 to Tabriz, then Iran's largest city seat of Qajar crown princes and major center of European and Ottomam consular activity. Azerbaijan was also an important center of European and American Christian missionary activity in Iran. In Tabriz, he was responsible for monitoring Iran's relations with the Russian and Ottoman empires, as safeguarding welfare of foreign nationals and protecting the province's Iranian Christian minority communities. He remained in Tabriz until early 1859, also overseeing availability of affordable bread during famine in city on 1857–1858. In recognition of his excellence in service, on late December 1855 Mirza Mohammad Khan was awarded the Order of the Lion and the Sun first class.

In January 1859, Mirza Mohammad Khan was invited to Tehran to meet shah. In April 1859, Mirza Mohammad Khan was dispatched to Ottoman Empire for monitor implementation of treaties and other arrangements between two countries as well as assessing condition, and safeguarding the treatment, of Iranian residents and pilgrims in Ottoman Iraq. On this mission, he was accompanied by his older son Mirza Ali Khan Amin od-Dowleh, a secretary at foreign ministry. Following his, Mirza Mohammad Khan was granted a private audience with shah in recognition of significance of his mission and its satisfactory fulfilment.

In spring 1862, his son Mirza Ali Khan was awarded a Robe of honour in recognition of his outstanding service at ministry, including for his excellent calligraphy. In July 1862, Mirza Mohammad Khan was awarded another Robe of honour for his service at foreign ministry and was appointed minister of Pensions and Endowments, Mirza Ali Khan promoted to his father's former rank at foreign ministry. This was followed by similar announcements in the coming months. Mirza Mohammad Khan remained at his new post until June 1865, at which date he was reappointed first secretary at foreign ministry.

=== Service in Mashhad ===
In 1867, still serving as first secretary at foreign ministry, Mirza Mohammad Khan accompanied the shah on a pilgrimage to Mashhad. During this royal pilgrimage, Mirza Mohammad Khan received the title of Majd ol-Molk (Exalted of the Land) and entrusted with the custodianship of Imam Reza Shrine in Khorasan province. In summer of 1868, Mirza Mohammad Khan was recalled to Tehran from Khorasan.

=== Return to Foreign ministry office ===
He was again reappointed first secretary at foreign ministry and was awarded another Order of the Lion and the Sun first class in March 1869.

In 1870, Mirza Mohammad Khan completed a handwritten treatise titled Kasf al-Ghara'eb fi Omur al-'Ajayeb, better known as Resala-ye Majdiya. Whereas Mer'at al-Arz, written in 1867 at order of Naser al-Din Shah, was replete with praise for shah and his administration, anonymously authored Resala-ye Majdiya offered an acerbic critique of various aspects of Iranian social, political, religious and cultural life. Notable for its elegant literary style, treatise unequivocally denounced country's maladministration. Initially circulated among a small group of Mirza Mohammad Khan's most trusted friends, manuscript soon gained considerable popularity in reformist circles. Hand-copied versions subsequently circulated widely for many years. Later generations of Iranian reformists consulted Resala-ye Majdiya, which was also widely quoted in constitutionalist press during Persian Constitutional Revolution. One example was serialised reproduction in Majalla-ye Estebdad, which remained incomplete and occasionally abridged before newspaper ceased publication around time of anti-constitutional royalist coup in June 1908.

=== Council of state ===
In 1858, Naser al-Din Shah abolished the office of Grand vizier after dismissing Mirza Aqa Khan Nuri from post. Shah instead entrusted the conduct of day-to-day affairs of government to the newly-founded Council of state, with eleven members composed of princes, ministers and high-ranking officials, after 1859, Consultative Assembly, composed of twenty-six officials and administrators. Mirza Moḥammad Khan was appointed a member of Council of State in March 1871. In same month, with escalation of nationwide famine had broken out previous year, Mirza Mohammad Khan was placed in charge of national granary.

By summer of 1873, when shah returned from his European journey, Mirza Mohammad was again serving as minister of Pensions and Endowments. He held this post until his death in 1881, albeit with possible reassignment to another post and then a third reappointment to ministry of Pensions and Endowments in interim, according to E'temad os-Saltaneh, he held that post on three occasions.

== Death and family ==
Mirza Mohammad Khan died in 1881 and was buried at Shah Abdol-Azim Shrine located in Ray, south of Tehran. He was survived by his wife, the sister of Pasha Khan Amin ol-Molk, a former minister of justice, as well as by six children. These were two sons;

- Mirza Ali Khan Amin od-Dowleh, the future reformist and Grand vizier of Mozaffar ad-Din Shah
- Mirza Taqi Khan Majd ol-Molk II and four daughters;
- Tavus Khanom, wife of Mirza Ebrahim Motamed os-Saltaneh and mother of Vosugh od-Dowleh and Ahmad Qavam
- Azamat od-Dowleh, wife of Mohammad-Ali Ala ol-Saltaneh
- Qamar Khanom, wife of Mohammad-Baqer Khan Shoja os-Saltaneh, minister of war under Naser al-Din Shah
- Enbeshat od-Dowleh, wife of Mirza Abolwahab Nezam ol-Molk, governor of Tehran in late 1890s.

== Sources ==
- Mohajer, Nasser; Amini, Iradj (2021). "Majd-al-Molk I, Mirzā Moḥammad Khan Sinaki Lavāsāni". In Yarshater, Ehsan (ed.). Encyclopædia Iranica (Online ed.). Encyclopædia Iranica Foundation.
- E'temad os-Saltaneh, Mohammad Hasan Khan (1984). Afshar, Iraj (ed.). المآثر و الآثار [The Works and Monuments] (in Persian). Tehran: Asatir Publishing.
- Aqeli, Baqer (2002). خاندان‌های حکومت‌گر در ایران: قاجاریه - پهلوی [Ruling Families of Iran: Qajar - Pahlavi] (in Persian). Tehran: Alam. ISBN 9789644051975.
- Rabiee, Manizheh (2005). Life of Naser al-Din Shah. Tehran: Muʼassasah-ʼi Farhangī-i Ahl-i Qalam. ISBN 9789648084191. OCLC 84660641.
- Elgood, Cyril (2010). A Medical History of Persia and the Eastern Caliphate: From the Earliest Times Until the Year A.D. 1932. Cambridge: Cambridge University Press. OCLC 5788500.
- E'temad os-Saltaneh, Mohammad Hasan Khan (1877). مرآت البلدان [The Mirror of the Countries] (in Persian). Vol. 2. Tehran: Blessed house press.
- Bamdad, Mehdi (1972). شرح حال رجال ایران در قرن ۱۲ و ۱۳ و ۱۴ هجری [Biographies of Iranian Notables in the 12th, 13th and 14th Centuries AH] (PDF) (in Persian). Vol. 3. Zavvar.
- E'temad os-Saltaneh, Mohammad Hasan Khan (1984a). تاریخ منتظم ناصری [The Naseri Chronological History]. Tehran: The World of Books.
- Adamiyat, Fereydun (2006). اندیشه تقدم و حکومت قانون: عصر سپهسالار [The Idea of Progress and the Rule of Law: The Era of Sepahsalar] (in Persian). Tehran: Khwarazmi.
- Shaybani, Mirza Ebrahim Khan Mostawfi (1987). منتخب التواریخ ناصری [Selected Histories of the Naseri Era] (in Persian). Tehran: Elmi.
- Hakim ol-Mamalek, Alinaqi b. Esma'il (1869). روزنامه سفر خراسان [The Diary of Hakim ol-Mamalek] (in Persian). Tehran: Dar al-Taba'eh-ye Khasseh.
- Soleimani, Karim (2000). القاب رجال دوره قاجاریه [Titles of Personages of Qajar Era] (in Persian). Tehran: Ney. ISBN 9789643124847.
- E'temad os-Saltaneh, Mohammad Hasan Khan (1877b). مرآت البلدان [The Mirror of the Countries] (in Persian). Vol. 3.
- Cole, Juan (1996). "Marking Boundaries, Marking Time: The Iranian Past and the Construction of the Self by Qajar Thinkers". Iranian Studies. 29 (1–2). doi:10.1080/00210869608701841. JSTOR 4310967.
- Sohrabi, Nader (1999). "Revolution and State Culture: The Circle of Justice and Constitutionalism in 1906 Iran". In Steinmetz, George (ed.). State/Culture: State-Formation after the Cultural Turn. Ithaca, NY: Cornell University Press. ISBN 978-0-8014-8533-6.
- Bahar, Mohammad-Taqi (2002). سبک‌شناسی: یا تاریخ تطور نثر فارسی [History of Evolution of Persian Prose] (in Persian). Vol. 3. Tehran: Zavvar.
- Amanat, Abbas (1997). Pivot of the Universe: Nasir Al-Din Shah Qajar and the Iranian Monarchy, 1831-1896. Berkeley, California: University of California Press. ISBN 0520083210.
