= Roshdiyeh =

Coordinates: 38°04′51″N 46°21′43″E

Roshdiyeh or Roshdiyeh town or Roshdie is the name of a quarter in northeast Tabriz, Iran. It is famous for its modern architecture. The name derives from Haj-Mirza Hassan Roshdieh, a pioneer of Iranian education.

== Photo gallery ==
Roshdiyeh monument
