= Letter of Tansar =

The Letter of Tansar (Persian: نامه تنسر) is a document from the Sasanian era, purportedly recording a letter sent by Tansar—a Zoroastrian high priest serving Ardashir I—to Gushnasp, king of Parishwar/Tabaristan. The letter seeks to persuade Gushnasp to submit to Ardashir's authority by addressing the concerns and objections he had raised in a previous letter.

There has been considerable disagreement regarding the Letter's dating and authenticity. Many scholars, such as Arthur Christensen and Mojtaba Minovi, have held that the Letter is a 6th-century forgery, produced during the reign of Khosrow I for political purposes. Others, such as James Darmesteter and Mary Boyce, believed the document to have been authentic in the main, containing only particular later additions. According to Boyce, a copy of the original letter may have been held at the diz-ī nibišt ("Fortress of Archives") in Pars, after which it was revised and recopied in the 6th century for contemporary political use. The letter appears to have been written soon after Ardashir's overthrow of Ardavan IV, in an attempt to secure the allegiance of Gushnasp, king of Tabaristan and former vassal to the Parthians, without bloodshed. The text appears to be a response to an earlier letter from Gushnasp, in which he had set out his objections to submitting to Ardashir's authority. One of these was the accusation that Ardashir "had taken away fires from the fire-temples, extinguished them and blotted them out." To this, Tansar replies that it was the "kings of the peoples [i.e. Parthians' vassal kings]" that began the practice of dynastic fires, an "innovation" unauthorized by the kings of old. A similar response appears in Book IV of the 9th century Denkard.

The letter was translated from Middle Persian into Arabic in the 8th century by Ibn al-Muqaffa', and from Arabic into New Persian in the 13th century by Ibn Isfandiyar, who preserved the complete letter in his History of Tabaristan. Ibn Isfandiyar's translation, which dates to 1210–1216, is the only complete version to survive, although fragments from independent Arabic translations are also extant, such as those cited by al-Biruni and al-Mas'udi.

The first critical translation of the Letter of Tansar was published in 1894 by James Darmesteter.
