= Mirza Ali Khan Amin od-Dowleh =

Premier of Iran (1844–1904)

Mirza Ali Khan
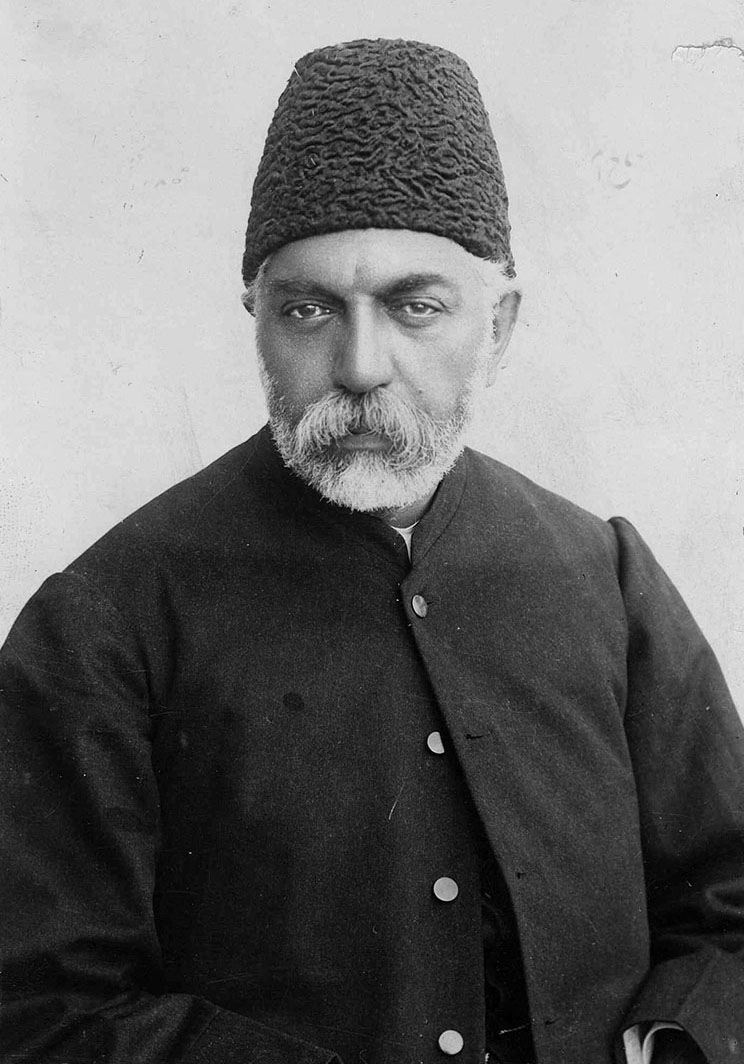

Premier of Iran
- In office 6 April 1897 – 5 June 1898
- Monarch: Mozaffar ad-Din Shah Qajar
- Preceded by: Mirza Ali Asghar Khan Amin al-Soltan
- Succeeded by: Mirza Mohsen Khan Moshir od-Dowleh

Personal details
- Born: 1844
- Died: 8 May 1904 (aged 59–60)
- Parent: Mirza Mohammad Khan Sinaki Lavasani (father)

Mirza Ali Khan (Persian: میرزا علی‌ خان), commonly known with title of Amin od-Dowleh (Persian: امین‌الدوله, lit. 'Trustee of the State'; 1844 – 8 May 1904), was an Iranian high ranking official under Naser al-Din Shah and Grand vizier under Mozaffar ad-Din Shah.

Amin od-Dowleh was recognized as one of the few Europeanized Iranians of his reputation during his lifetime derived primarily from his lifestyle and outward demeanor rather than his political writings or philosophy. Completed around 1880, his Tehran residence was designed in a European style, serving as a venue for Western-style gatherings that welcomed prominent foreign guests, including European women, and introduced Western music and dance. Over time, Amin od-Dowleh earned a reputation as a progressive, liberal reformer and during the Persian Constitutional Revolution, he was revered as an intellectual forerunner by a younger generation of Iranians.

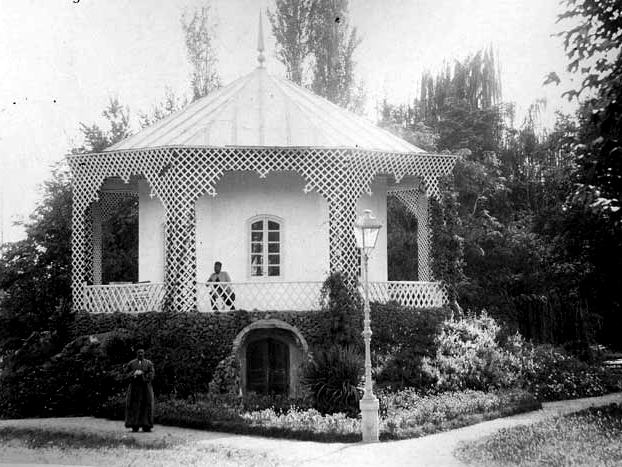
Garden of Amin od-Dowleh in Tehran

== Early career and rise ==
His father, Mirza Mohammad Khan Sinaki Lavasani, was a prominent court official. In 1855, at the age of fourteen, Mirza Ali Khan became a secretary in Ministry of Foreign Affairs. Twelve years later, in 1867, Mirza Ali Khan was appointed Naser al-Din Shah's private secretary. In 1874, he was named minister to the shah for private correspondence, and gained the new title Amin ol-Molk (Trustee of the Realm), In the same year he was appointed Chairman of Reorganized consultative assembly. In 1878 he arranged Naser al-Din Shah's second journey to Europe. After returning to Iran, the shah decided to introduce certain changes into the monetary system which involved debasement of coins, Amin ol-Molk refused to concur and impatient shah gave operation of the mint to Agha Ebrahim Amin os-Soltan. Shah continued to have confidence in him and in 1880 granted him the title Amin od-Dowleh (Trustee of the State).

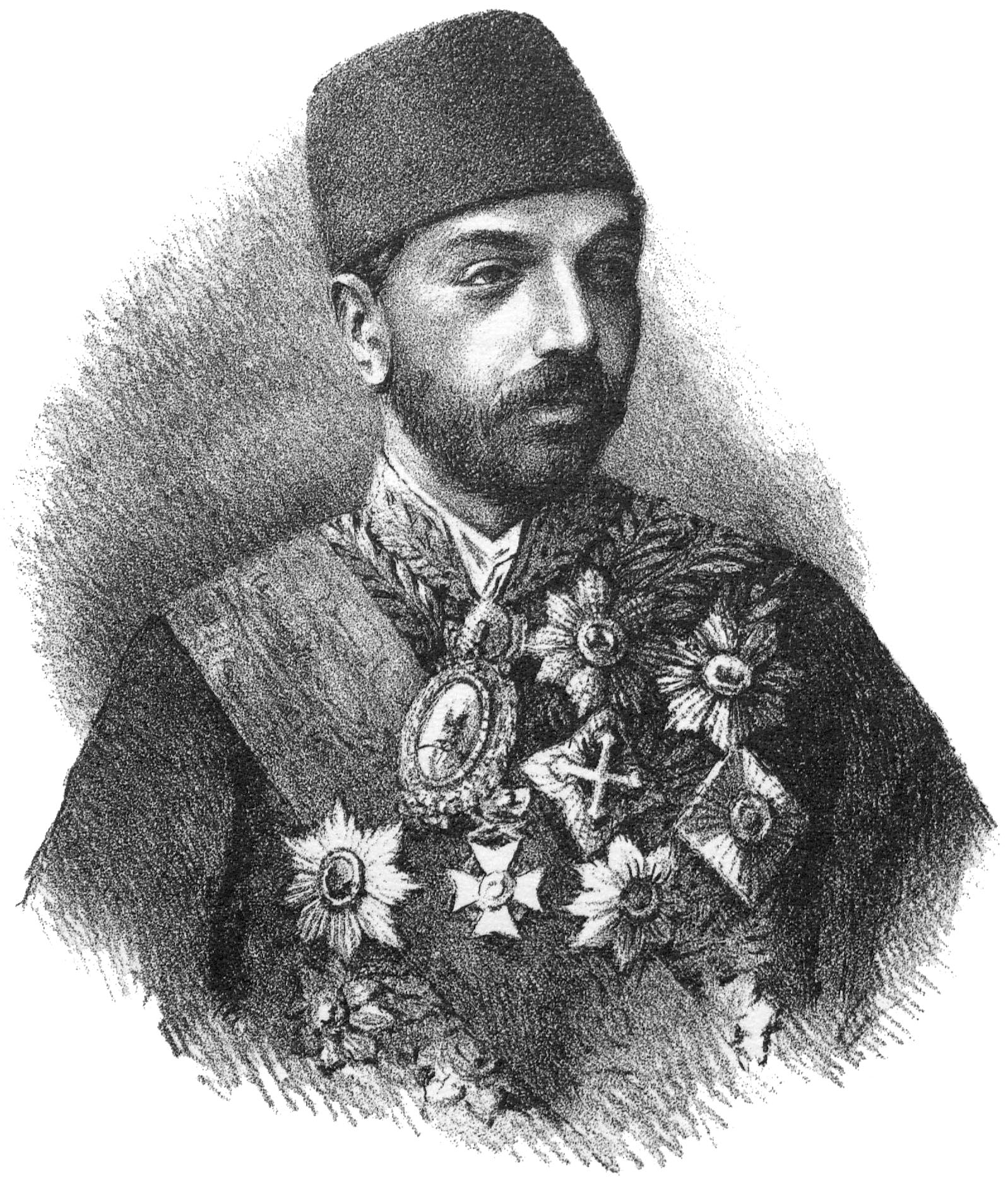
Illustration of Amin od-Dowleh by Abu Torab Ghaffari, dated 1883

In 1883 Mirza Ali Asghar Khan Amin al-Soltan became Minister of Court at twenty-five years old. Finding himself outmaneuvered by younger rival, Amin od-Dowleh declined to challenge Amin al-Soltan between 1885 and 1896. Recognizing that Amin od-Dowleh retained a unique hold on Shah's favor, Amin al-Soltan abandoned open rivalry in favor of an attitude of condescending patronage. Though Amin od-Dowleh continued to hold his younger competitor in contempt, he ultimately resigned himself to the arrangement. One of the major political developments during the later years of Naser al-Din Shah's reign was the Tobacco Protest which arose in opposition to the tobacco concession, which the shah was forced to cancel in December 1891. Amin od-Dowleh could not avoid controversy and he submitted petition of tobacco merchants protesting the concession to shah.

=== Rise to Premiership ===
Photograph of Amin od-Dowleh taken around his rise by Eugène Pirou

Mozaffar ad-Din Shah reaffirmed Amin al-Soltan as grand vizier, but the political situation in Tehran soon changed with rise of Prince Abdol-Hossein Farman Farma, who became Commander-in-chief and Minister of War. With the Shah's support and that of most courtiers, he quickly forced Amin al-Soltan from power and took control of the government as a self-appointed premier rather than an official grand vizier. Farman Farma's influence was strengthened by his royal blood and support from the Ulama. After Amin od-Dowleh resigned his post in Azerbaijan and arrived in Tehran, he became prime minister on 6 April 1897, but could not exercise full authority while Farmanfarma remained powerful. Farmanfarma's interference had already caused Interior Minister Ali-Qoli Khan Mokber od-Dowleh to resign, and although Amin od-Dowleh was expected to dismiss him, he waited until September 1897, when he persuaded Shah to remove Farmanfarma and send him to Fars. From a political viewpoint, Amin od-Dowleh now stood without challenger. He had the shah's full confidence and was in a position to bring the entire machinery of government under his own control.

== Premier of Iran ==
Amin od-Dowleh identified financial reform and modern education as Iran's most urgent needs, both supported by Mozaffar ad-Din Shah. With the treasury empty, soldiers and officials unpaid for months and unrest looming, he considered a foreign loan unavoidable. To avoid diplomatic complications, he first sought a secret loan in Paris through a neutral third party, but Anglo-Russian pressure blocked the talks. He then turned to the British-owned Imperial Bank of Persia, requesting £400,000 and later reducing it to £250,000. The bank demanded customs revenues of Bushehr and Kermanshah as security but advanced only £50,000, barely enough to cover a fraction of the government's debts. Amin od-Dowleh's efforts to implement fiscal reforms—which required stricter central control over government expenditures, salaries, and royal pensions—alienated officials across all levels of the administration. He went so far as to attempt to restrict the personal expenditures of the Shah himself, provoking further opposition at court.

=== Council of Education ===
On February-March 1898, Amin od-Dowleh founded Society named Anjoman-e Ma'aref (Council of Education) in order to promote the cause of Western-type education in Iran. The appointment of Amin od-Dowleh, was an active supporter of modern education, to the premiership encouraged the reformist-minded intellectuals. Amin od-Dowleh's patronage was responsible for the establishment of the Roshdieh school in Tehran by Haji-Mirza Hassan Roshdieh.

Amin od-Dowleh's advocacy for modern education drew fierce hostility from Ulama, whose interference in daily state affairs he actively sought to curb. Meanwhile, his longtime rival, Amin al-Soltan, conspired with Russian diplomats to sabotage pending British loan and secure his own political comeback. A court coalition led by Mirza Mahmud Khan Hakim ol-Molk, Hossein-Qoli Nezam al-Saltaneh Mafi and Mirza Mohsen Khan Moshir od-Dowleh ultimately persuaded the indecisive, ailing Shah to dismiss the grand vizier—whose own declining resolve hastened his downfall.

== Later life and death ==
Amin od-Dowleh was removed from office on 5 June 1898 and he soon withdrew to his estate in Gilan. He later undertook a nine-month pilgrimage to Mecca, during which he wrote a memoir. He died of kidney disease on 8 May 1904 at the age 59 or 60, remaining cynical and discontented to the end.

== Sources ==
- Farmayan, Hafez (1989). "AMĪN-AL-DAWLA, MĪRZĀ ʿALĪ KHAN". In Yarshater, Ehsan (ed.). Encyclopædia Iranica (Online ed.). Encyclopædia Iranica Foundation.
- E'temad os-Saltaneh, Mohammad Hasan Khan (1877). مرأت البلدان ناصری [The Naserian Mirror of the Lands] (in Persian). Vol. 2. Tehran: Blessed State Printing House.
- Amin od-Dowleh, Mirza Ali Khan (1977). Farmanfarmaian, Hafez F. (ed.). خاطرات سیاسی میرزا علی خان امین الدوله [Political Memoirs of Mirza Ali Khan Amin od-Dowleh] (in Persian) (2nd ed.). Tehran: Amir Kabir Publishers.
- E'temad os-Saltaneh, Mohammad Hasan Khan (1971). Afshar, Iraj (ed.). روزنامه خاطرات اعتمادالسلطنه [The Diary of E'temad al-Saltaneh] (in Persian). Vol. 2. Tehran: Amir Kabir Publishers.
- Lambton, Ann K. S. (1965). "The Tobacco Regie: Prelude to Revolution". Studia Islamica. 22 (22). doi:10.2307/1595096. JSTOR 1595096.
- Kazemzadeh, Firuz (1968). Russia and Britain in Persia, 1864-1914; a study in imperialism. New Haven: Yale University Press. ISSN 0084-3431.
- Curzon, George Nathaniel (1892). Persia And The Persian Question. London: Longmans, Green.
- Anwar, Sayyed Abd-Allah (1985). "Anjoman-e Maʿāref". In Yarshater, Ehsan (ed.). Encyclopædia Iranica (Online ed.). Encyclopædia Iranica Foundation.
- Kasravi, Ahmad (2006). History of the Iranian Constitutional Revolution. Translated by Evan, Siegel. Costa Mesa: Mazda Publishers. ISBN 1-56859-197-7.
- Amin od-Dowleh, Mirza Ali Khan (1975). Kazemiyeh, Eslam (ed.). سفرنامه امین‌الدوله [Travelogue of Amin od-Dowleh] (in Persian). Tehran: Tus publisher.
