= Abdollah Khan Amin ol-Dowleh =

Iranian politician (1779–1847)

- عبدالله خان
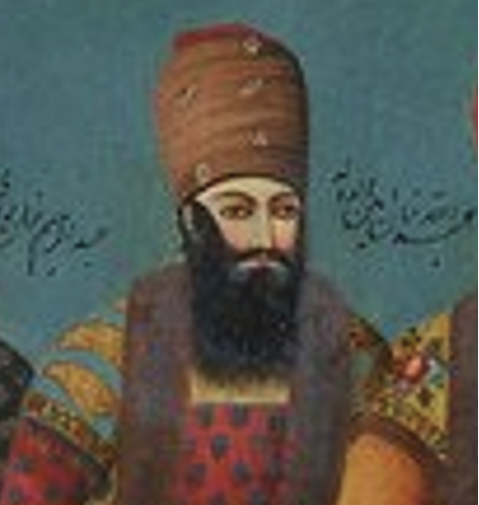
- A portrait of Abdollah Khan in the Nowrooz Salaam Ceremony. c. 1830

Grand Vizier of Persia
- In office 1823–1825
- Monarch: Fath-Ali Shah Qajar
- Preceded by: Hajji Mohammad Hossein Isfahani
- Succeeded by: Asef al-Dowleh
- In office 21 March 1828 – 23 October 1834
- Monarch: Fath-Ali Shah Qajar
- Preceded by: Asef al-Dowleh
- Succeeded by: Qa'em-Maqam

Personal details
- Born: c. 1779 Isfahan, Zand Iran
- Died: 1847 Tehran, Qajar Iran
- Relations: Hajji Mohammad Hossein Isfahani (father)

Abdollah Khan (Persian: عبدالله خان; 1779–1847), also known by his honorific Amin ol-Dowleh (Persian: امین‌الدوله, lit. 'Trustee of the Realm'), was the chief revenue accountant or minister of finance (mostowfi ol-mamalek) and later prime minister under the Qajar shah Fath-Ali Shah (r. 1797–1834).

He was born as the oldest son of the former prime minister Hajji Mohammad Hossein Isfahani (1758–1823). It appears that his mother was a daughter of a petty chief from the Bakhtiari clan. He was born in Isfahan, and also served as its governor during his career.
