= Mirza Ali Asghar Khan Amin al-Soltan =

Prime Minister of Iran (1858–1907)

Atabak Ali Asghar Khan Amin al-Soltan
- علی‌اصغر خان
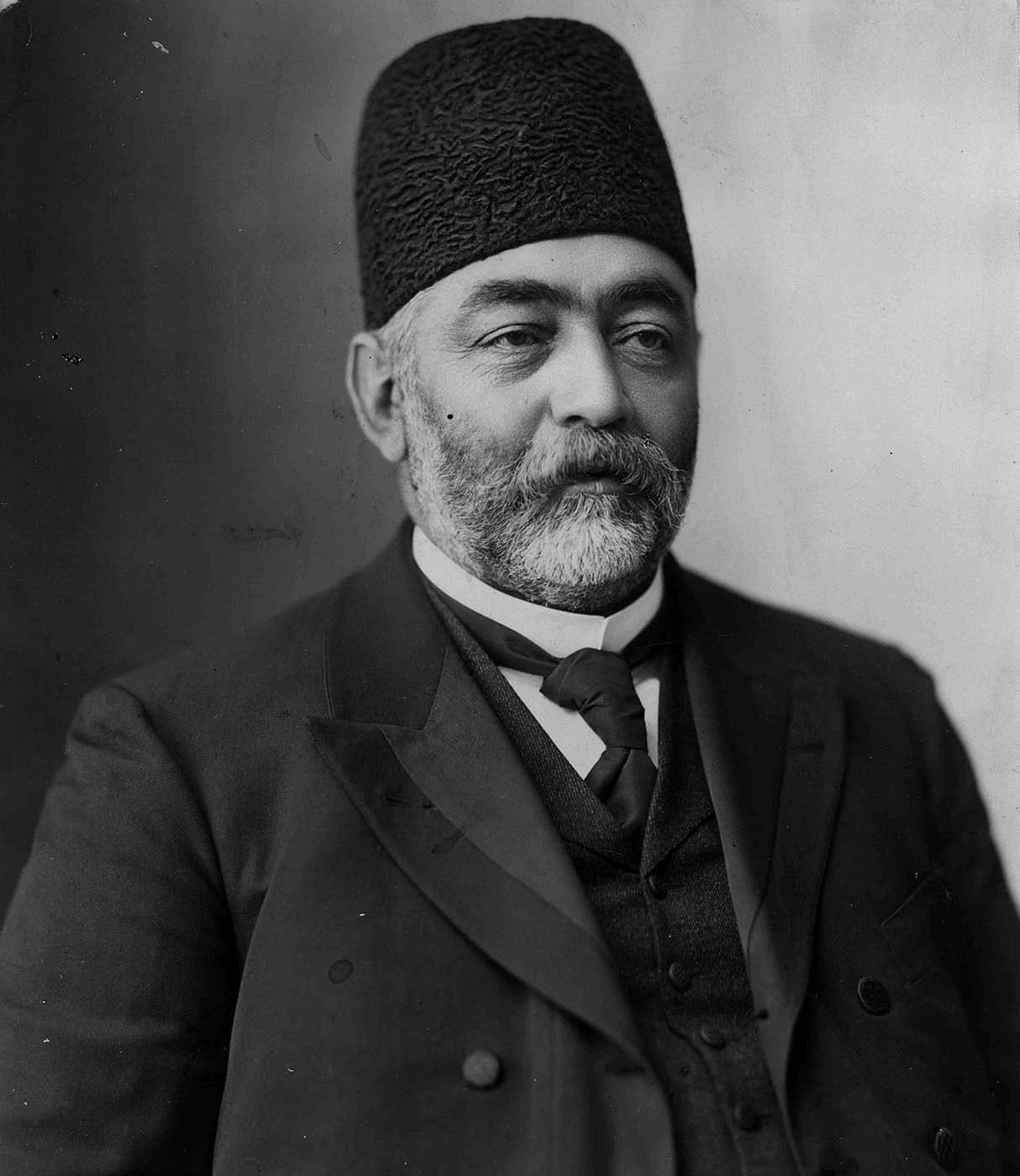
- Formal portrait c. 1900–1907

1st Prime Minister of Iran
- In office 1 May 1907 – 31 August 1907
- Monarch: Mohammad Ali Shah Qajar
- Preceded by: Soltan-Ali Vazir-e Afkham (Acting)
- Succeeded by: Ahmad Moshir al-Saltaneh

Premier of Iran
- In office 13 March 1887 – 23 November 1896
- Preceded by: Mirza Yusuf Ashtiani
- Succeeded by: Mirza Ali Khan Amin od-Dowleh
- In office 1 June 1898 – 24 January 1904
- Preceded by: Mirza Mohsen Khan Moshir od-Dowleh
- Succeeded by: Abdol Majid Mirza

Personal details
- Born: 6 January 1858 Tehran, Iran
- Died: 31 August 1907 (aged 49) Tehran, Iran
- Cause of death: Assassination
- Resting place: Fatima Masumeh Shrine
- Parent: Agha Ebrahim Amin os-Soltan (father)

Mirza Ali Asghar Khan (Persian: میرزا علی‌اصغر خان; 6 January 1858 – 31 August 1907), also known by his honorific titles of Amin al-Soltan and Atabak, served as Prime Minister of Iran from 1887 to 1896 under Naser ed-Din Shah Qajar, from 1898 to 1904 under Mozaffar ed-Din Shah Qajar and from May 1907 until his assassination in August 1907 under Mohammad Ali Shah Qajar.

== Early life ==
Ali Asghar was born on 6 January 1858. He was the second son of Agha Ebrahim Amin os-Soltan, an influential court minister of Georgian origin. When Ali Asghar was 15 years old, he began helping his father in politics. The next year, Ali Asghar and his father accompanied Naser al-Din Shah to his pilgrimage to the holy Shi'a cities of Najaf, Karbala, Kadhimiya, and Samarra.

When Ali Asghar returned to his native Tehran, he was promoted to commander of the royal escort cavalry, and in the following years continued to rise to higher offices, eventually being promoted to the treasurer of the army. After the death of his father in 1883, he received the latter's honorific title "Amin al-Soltan" and became the Justice Minister. A few years later he received the title of "Atabak" and took over the post of Prime Minister.

== Exile and return ==
After Naser's assassination in 1896, Ali Asghar helped by securing the throne and its secure transfer to his son, Mozaffar ad-Din Shah Qajar. In November 1896, Ali Asghar was dismissed from his prime minister office by Mozaffar ad-Din Shah. Ali Asghar then initially retired to Qom, later traveled through Russia to China and Japan, and then emigrated to Switzerland. During the Iranian Constitutional Revolution, the new Qajar shah Mohammad Ali Shah Qajar invited Ali Asghar back to Iran.

Although Ali Asghar had many who opposed him, he also had supporters in major Iranian cities such as Qazvin, Rasht, and his native Tehran. He was shortly appointed by Mohammad Ali Shah as the Prime Minister of Iran. At the time of Ali Asghar's re-appointment as prime minister, Iran was in chaos: the state owed money to the people who served them; British-Russian rivalry over Iran; Ottoman incursions on the west Iranian borders; and devastating rebellions. Ali Asghar managed to quickly stop the Ottomans, and also tried to make stability fix the financial problems in Iran.

Ali Asghar was assassinated by radical left-wing members of the opposition in the front of the Iranian Parliament on 31 August 1907, though it has been suggested that Mohammad Ali Shah was involved in the assassination.

== See also ==
- Pahlavi dynasty
- List of prime ministers of Iran

== Sources ==
- Rahimi, MalekMohammad. Gorji haye Iran. Esfahan: Yekta, (2000). (The Georgians of Iran)
- Cyrus Ghani: Iran and the rise of Reza Shah. From Qajar collapse to Pahlavi rule. I. B. Tauris, London u. a. 1998, ISBN 1-86064-258-6, S. 78.
- Amanat, A. (1989). "AMĪN-AL-SOLṬĀN, ĀQĀ EBRĀHĪM". Encyclopaedia Iranica, Vol. I, Fasc. 9. pp. 949–951.

Political offices
Preceded by Mirza Yousof Khan Ashtiani	Premier of Iran; 1887–1896	Vacant Title next held by Mirza Ali Khan Amin od-Dowleh
Preceded by Mirza Ali Khan Amin od-Dowleh	Premier of Iran; 1898–1904	Succeeded by Abdol Majid Mirza
Preceded by Mirza Nasrullah Khan	Prime Minister of Iran; 1907	Succeeded by Mohammad Vali Khan Tonekaboni
