= Khosrow-Yazdegerd =

Khosrow-Yazdegerd was a 5th-century statesman in Sasanian Iran, who was active during the reign of shah Yazdegerd I (r. 399–421). He first appears in 410, when he was sent with Mihr-Shapur as the shah's representative to the Nestorian Council of Seleucia-Ctesiphon.

Khosrow-Yazdegerd is the second person known to occupy the office of wuzurg framadar (grand vizier) after Abarsam, who was active under Ardashir I (r. 224–242). He was most likely succeeded by Mihr Narseh.

== Sources ==
- Shayegan, M. Rahim (2003). "HAZĀRBED". Encyclopaedia Iranica, Vol. XII, Fasc. 1. pp. 93–95.
- Chaumont, Marie-Louise (2000). "FRAMADĀR". Encyclopaedia Iranica, Vol. X, Fasc. 2. pp. 125–126.
