= Mirza Mohsen Khan Moshir od-Dowleh =

Iranian politician (d. 1910)

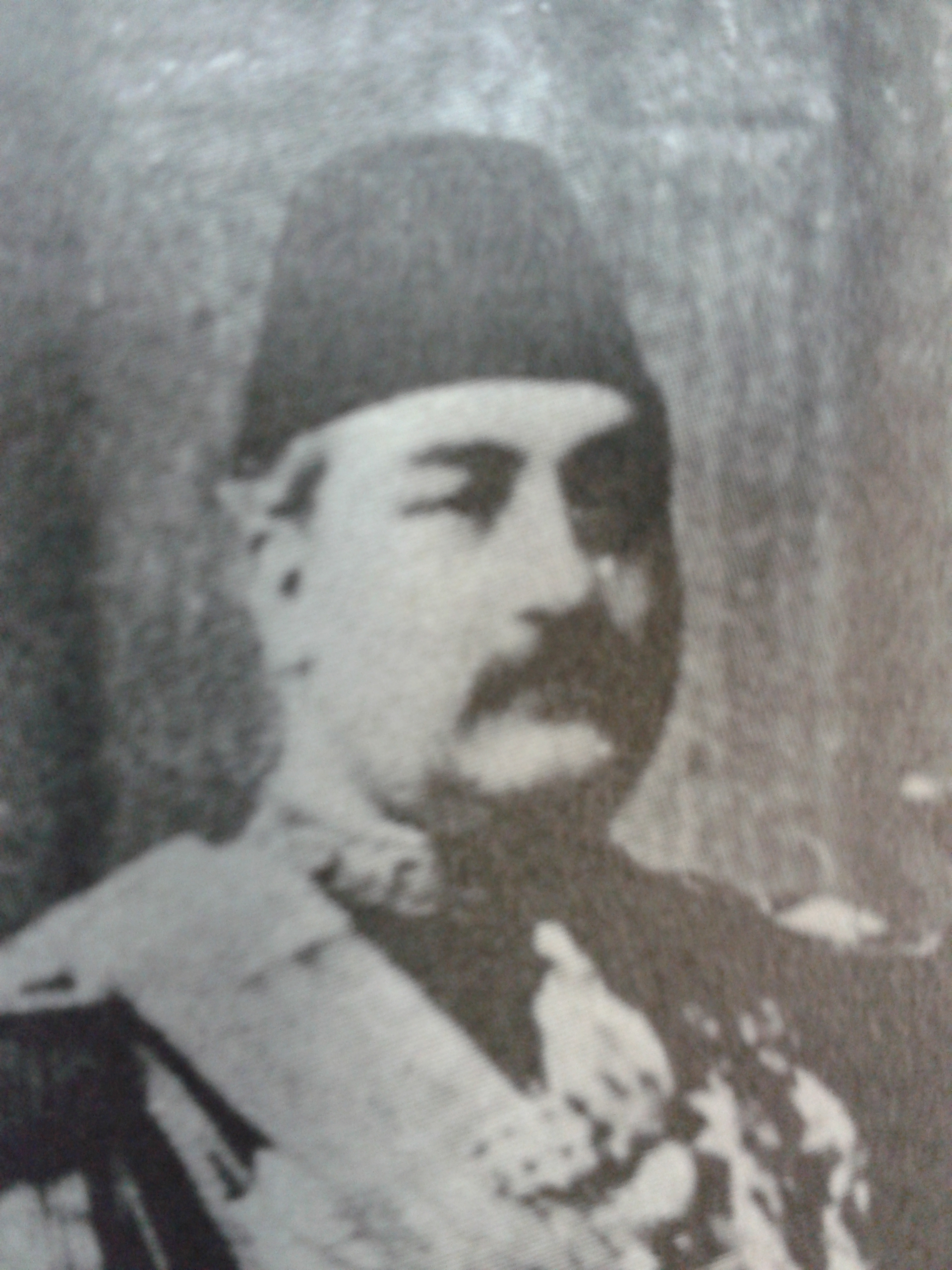

Premier of Iran
- In office 5 June 1898 – 11 August 1898
- Monarch: Mozaffar ad-Din Shah Qajar
- Preceded by: Mirza Ali Khan Amin od-Dowleh
- Succeeded by: Mirza Ali Asghar Khan Amin al-Soltan

Minister of Foreign Affairs
- In office 1896–1899
- Preceded by: Mirza Abbas Khan Qavam od-Dowleh
- Succeeded by: Mirza Nasrullah Khan

Personal details
- Died: 13 September 1910
- Parent: Shaykh Mirza Kazem (father)

Mirza Mohsen Khan Moshir od-Dowleh (Persian: میرزا محسن خان مشیرالدوله; died 13 September 1910), was an Iranian diplomat and politician.

== Biography ==
His father Shaykh Mirza Kazem was an son of Mirza Mohsen Arab, a merchant from Tabriz who had migrated there during the reign of Fath-Ali Shah. His mother Jeyran Khanom was the daughter of Hajji Seyyed Hossein and an sister of Adl ol-Molk and Rokn ol-Edaleh. In his youth, Mirza Mohsen Khan learned Arabic, English, French and possibly Italian. During the years when Amir Kabir resided in Tabriz, he was recognized by him and entered government service as a translator. In addition to his knowledge of various languages he was also skilled in Nastaliq calligraphy.

== Career ==
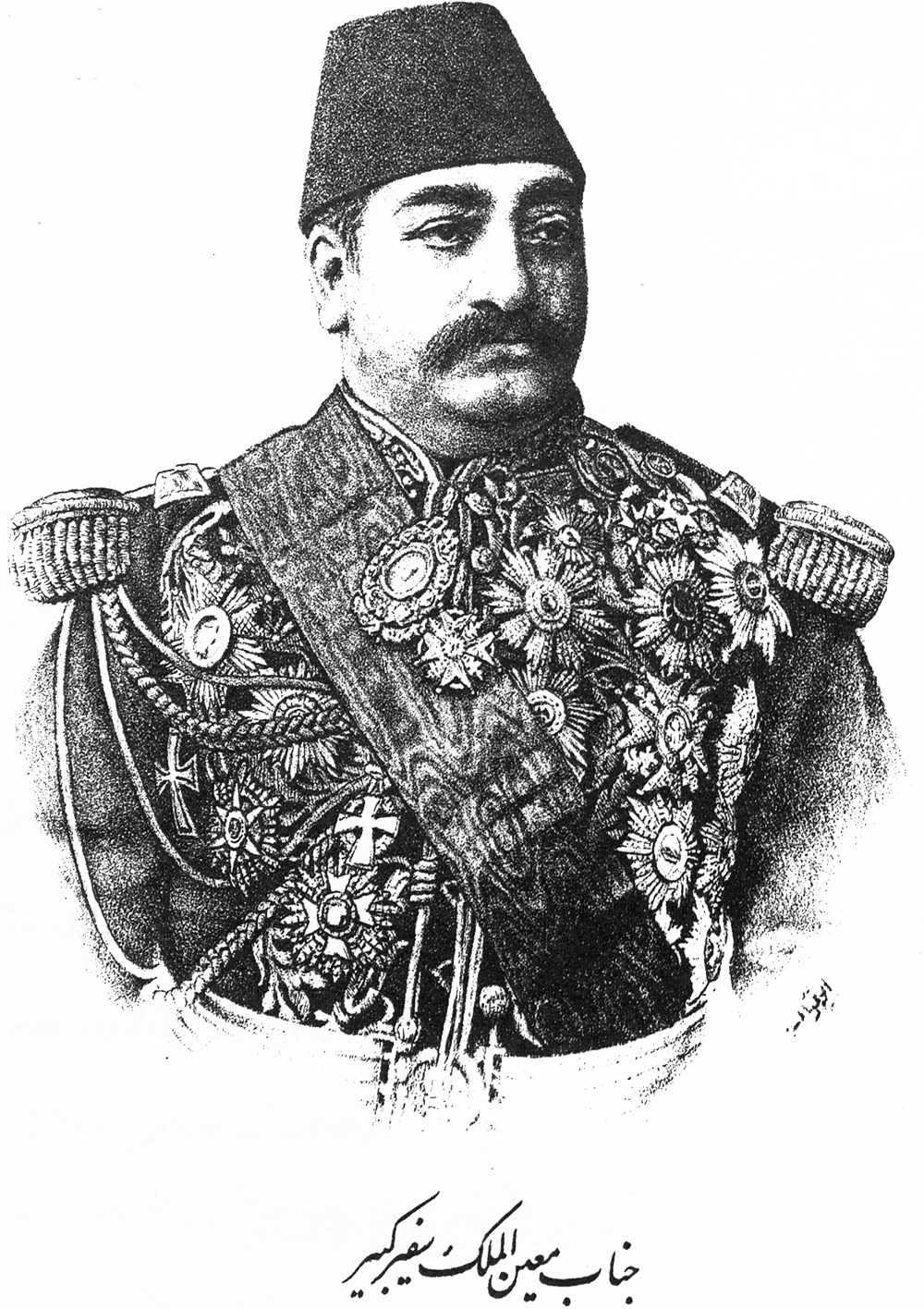
Portrait as Minister of Foreign Affairs by Abu Torab Ghaffari

Between 1851 and 1852, with the opening of Dar al-Fonun, Mirza Mohsen Khan served as translator for Italian instructor of army, infantry and military organization known as Metrazzova. He entered to Iranian Army in 1848. In 1855, he served as Second Class Secretary of Legation in Saint Petersburg. From 1856 to 1857, he took part in the Anglo-Persian War. Between 1858 and 1865, he served as Secretary of Legation under Hasan Ali Khan Garrusi and in 1866, became Chargé d'affaires in Paris. From 1872 to 1890, he served as the Iranian ambassador to Istanbul. He contributed articles to the newspaper Qanun (“Law”), for which he was recalled from Istanbul to Tehran in 1891. He was granted the title Moshir od-Dowleh. In 1892, he served as Minister of Commerce and Justice. In November 1896, he was appointed Minister of Foreign Affairs and eventually became Prime Minister.

== Sources ==
- Ra'in, Esmail (1978). Farāmūshkhāneh va Farāmāsūnarī dar Īrān (in Persian). Vol. 1. Amir Kabir Publishers.
- Mehdi Mousavi, Seyyed Mohammad (1972). Gozaresh-hā-ye Panj Sāleh-ye Safārat-e Irān dar London (in Persian). Vol. 32.
- Burrell, Robert Michael; Jarman, Robert L. (1997). Iran: Political Diaries, 1881-1965. Vol. 1. University of Michigan: Archive Editions. ISBN 9781852077105.
