= Nihayat al-arab fi akhbar al-Furs wa'l-'Arab =

9th-century Arab history of Persia

Nihāyat al-arab fī akhbār al-Furs wa ʾl-ʿArab ("The Ultimate Aim, about the History of the Persians and the Arabs") is an anonymous 9th-century Arabic history of Persia and South Arabia. Its author is sometimes known as Pseudo-Aṣmaʿī. It is preserved in four manuscripts:

- Cambridge University Library, Qq. 225, part of the collection of Johann Ludwig Burckhardt
- Gotha Research Library, A. 1741, a copy known to Theodor Nöldeke
- British Library, Add. 23298, a copy dated AH 1043 entitled Kitāb al-Nihāyat and Siyar al-Mulūk
- British Library, Add. 18505, an incomplete copy of a distinct recension entitled Taʾrīkh al-Aṣmaʿī

The first edition of the Nihāyat by Mohammad Taqi Danesh Pajouh was published in Tehran in 1997. Michael Bonner had plans to produce an English translation.

The preface of the Nihāyat, which is full of anachronisms, claims it to be an older work than it is. It claims to be the work of al-Aṣmaʿī (d. 828) commissioned by the Caliph Hārūn al-Rashīd (d. 809) and assisted by Abū al-Bakhtarī (d. 815/6), who wrote an introduction to the Siyar al-Mulūk ("Chronicles of the Kings") based on the Kitāb al-Mubtadaʾ ("Book of Origins") to bring its history back to Creation. The composition of the Siyar is attributed to ʿĀmir al-Shaʿbī (d. 724) and Ibn al-Qirriyya (d. 689) assisted by Ibn al-Muqaffaʿ (d. 757) and commissioned by the Caliph ʿAbd al-Malik ibn Marwān (d. 705). The Siyar is introduced thus:

These are legends of bygone kings and former nations and past ages; of the Tyrants, the Kings of Yaman and the Monarchs of Persia, with accounts of their circumstances, their histories, their burial-places, and their lives, and of what hath been recorded by the Arabs and the Persians concerning their wars, their raids, their poems, their wise sayings, their customs, their harangues, their letters, and their decisions, from the time of Shem the son of Noah until God sent Muhammad.

This second preface gives the impression that the Siyar was the Arabic translation of the Middle Persian Khwadāynāmag made by Ibn al-Muqaffaʿ, now lost. It is impossible that most of the Persian material in the Nihāyat come from the Khwadāynāmag, but some of the shorter and drier royal biographies may ultimately be derived from it.

The Nihāyat generally agrees with the history of al-Dīnawarī (d. 895), although it often provides more detail, as in the story of Bahrām Chōbīn. In some cases, this additional detail is corroborated by later quotations from the lost work of al-Kisrawī (c. 870). The author frequently quotes Persian or uses Persian terms, while always providing an accurate Arabic translation, which implies that the author was fluent in Persian.

Edward G. Browne divides the text into four distinct parts: history down to Alexander the Great; the life of Alexander based on the Alexander Romance; the period of the Parthian Empire and the legend of Budasaf; and the Sasanian Empire and the Caliphate. In the Cambridge manuscript, the first part, including introduction and preface, takes up around 42 folios; the second, 22 folios; the third, 10 folios; and the last, 148 folios.

== Bibliography ==
- Bonner, Michael Richard Jackson (n.d.). "Research Proposal". Dr Michael Bonner. Archived from the original on 2023-03-20.
- Browne, Edward G. (1900). "Some Account of the Arabic Work entitled Niháyatuʾl-irab fí akhbáriʾl-Furs waʾl-ʿArab, Particularly of That Part Which Treats of the Persian Kings" (PDF). Journal of the Royal Asiatic Society. 32 (2): 195–259.
- Danesh Pajouh, Mohammad Taqi (1997). Nihāyat al-Irab fī Aḫbār al-Furs wa al-ʿArab. Tehran: Anjoman-e Āṯār-o Mofāḫer-e Farhangī.
- Doufikar-Aerts, Faustina (2003). "Sīrat al-Iskandar: An Arabic Popular Romance of Alexander". Oriente Moderno. Nuova serie. 22 (2): 505–520. JSTOR 25817892.
- Grignaschi, Mario (1969). "La Nihāyat al-ʾarab fī aḫbāri-l-furs wa-l-ʿarab (primière partie)". Bulletin d'études orientales. 22: 15–67.
- Grignaschi, Mario (1973). "La Nihāyat al-ʿarab fī aḫbāri-l-furs wa-l-ʿarab et les Siyaru mulūki-l-ʿAǧam du Ps. Ibn-al-Muqaffaʿ". Bulletin d'études orientales. 26: 83–184.
- Hämeen-Anttila, Jaakko (2018). Khwadāynāmag: The Middle Persian Book of Kings. Brill.
