= Al-Adab al-Kabīr =

- Author: Abdullah Ibn al-Muqaffa
- Original title: الأدب الكبیر
- Language: Arabic

Al-Adab al-Kabīr (Arabic: الأدب الكبیر or more correctly Arabic: الآداب الكبیر) is an Arabic book by Abdullah Ibn al-Muqaffa, written about Persian manners and court etiquette. Some researchers (e.g. al-ʿĀmerī) believe that the content of this book is based on Avesta’s moral precepts. However, according to Iranica, many of the sayings included in that book occur in Greek gnomonology. One part of the work deals with rulers and the court etiquette, and the other part deals with the behavior in society.
