= Sinak, Tehran =

Sinak سينك
- village
- Location within Iran
- Coordinates: 35°50′52″N 51°41′15″E
- Country: Iran
- Province: Tehran
- County: Shemiranat
- Bakhsh: Lavasanat
- Rural District: Lavasan-e Kuchak
- Elevation: 1,980 m (6,500 ft)

Population (2006)
  - Total: 116
- Time zone: UTC+3:30 (IRST)
  - Summer (DST): UTC+4:30 (IRDT)

Sinak (Persian: سينك, also Romanized as Sīnak) is a village in Lavasan-e Kuchak Rural District, Lavasanat District, Shemiranat County, Tehran Province, Iran. At the 2006 census, its population was 116, in 39 families.
