= Haji-Mirza Hassan Roshdieh =

Iranian cleric, teacher, and journalist (1851–1944)

Coordinates: 38°04′19.61″N 46°17′48.13″E

Mirza Hassan Tabrizi
- میرزا حسن تبریزی
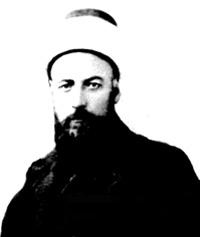
- Photograph of Mirza Hassan Tabrizi, ca. 1910
- Born: 4 July 1851; Tabriz, Sublime State of Iran
- Died: 12 December 1944 (aged 93); Qom, Imperial State of Iran
- Other name: Haji-Mirza Hassan Roshdieh
- Children: Shahnaz Azad

Haji Mirza Hassan Tabrizi (Persian: میرزا حسن تبریزی; 4 July 1851 – 12 December 1944), famously known as Haji-Mirza Hassan Roshdieh (Persian: حاجی میرزا حسن رشدیه), was an Iranian Shia cleric, teacher, politician, and journalist. He introduced some modern teaching methods in Iran, especially in teaching the alphabet. These are still used to some degree in Iran's primary schools.

Hassan Roshdieh was an ethnic Iranian Azerbaijani and began studying as a Twelver Shi'a cleric there, Roshdieh abandoned his plans of going to Najaf to study in religious schools after reading an article about the hardships of education in the Persian language from the newspaper Akhtar. He left for Beirut in 1880 and studied for two years in its Daar ul-Mu'allimeen (teacher school), and then continued with visiting Istanbul and Egypt. In 1883, he left for Yerevan and founded the first modern school for Muslims there. In his new method of teaching, Roshdieh used the concept of sounds instead of alphabetic letters to teach the Persian and Azeri languages, which use the Arabic script. During his four years of managing his school in Yerevan, Roshdieh wrote Vatan Dili (The Language of the Homeland) in Azerbaijani, which was taught in several schools of the Caucasus as a primer until the October Revolution.

It was during his stay in Yerevan that Roshdieh met Naser al-Din Shah Qajar, who took him to Nakhichevan. Roshdieh later returned to his birthplace in Tabriz, where he established the first primary schools in Iran in 1886 or 1887. While Ahmad Kasravi has claimed in his book that the primary school was established with the help of Mirza Ali Khan Amin od-Dowleh, the then Premier of Iran, this cannot be confirmed by the records of Fakhreddin Roshdieh, Mirza Hassan's son.

The schools were highly rejected by the more conservative Tabrizis, especially clerics, alleging that Roshdieh is trying to make the students quit Islam, mentioning the school ring and its similarity to church bells. This resulted in mobs destroying some of his schools (which resulted in a few students being killed or injured), unsuccessful assassination attempts using guns, and later a fatwa against the modern schools, which finally resulted in him fleeing Tabriz.

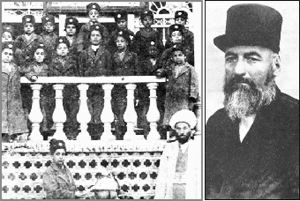
Photograph of Hassan Roshdieh with his students

In Tehran, and during the reign of Mozaffar ad-Din Shah Qajar and the prime ministership of Amin od-Dowleh, Roshdieh started the Roshdieh School with the help of the government. He was a member of the political Ma'āref Association and was active in the fight for freedoms and the constitution during the Iranian Constitutional Revolution, leading to him being exiled or fleeing Iran a few times.

After a final return to Iran, Roshdieh established a new school and a magazine in 1904, both called Maktab. He finally quit his political and educational activities in 1927 and moved to Qom, where he died in 1944 and is buried.

Roshdieh is claimed to be the first Azerbaijani to write poems for children. He also had plans for the education of blind people and had helped establish girl schools in Iran. He has several books and articles in Persian and Azerbaijani. He was called Roshdieh after the name of primary schools in the then Ottoman Empire, roshdiyye, because he had established the first of such schools in Iran.

Roshdieh is mentioned in a famous poem of Nima Yooshij, yād-e ba’zi nafarāt (The Memory of Some People).

== Mirza Ahmad Modarress Avval ==
Educated scholar Haj Mirza Ahmad Modarres Avval, along with Mirza Hassan Roshdieh, played a major role in establishing and managing the first schools opened in Tabriz. His children, including Mohammad Shahandeh, Mirza Hossein Modarress zadeh, Akbar Modarress Avval (Shiva), Mirza Jafar Modarress Avval, and Razieh Modarress Avval, Mahmoud Modarres Aval have also worked closely with him in management and teaching.

== Sources ==
- The Memory of Some People, an article in Iran about Roshdieh and his legacy
- The Persian Encyclopedia's article on Roshdieh, Volume 1, pages 1085 and 1086.
- Archive of Mirza Hassan Roshdieh Papers at the International Institute of Social History
- Mirza Hasan Roshdiyyeh: The Architect of Modern Education in Iran
