= Hajji Mohammad Hossein Isfahani =

Iranian architect and politician (1758–1823)

Hajji Mohammad Hossein Khan Sadr
- محمدحسین
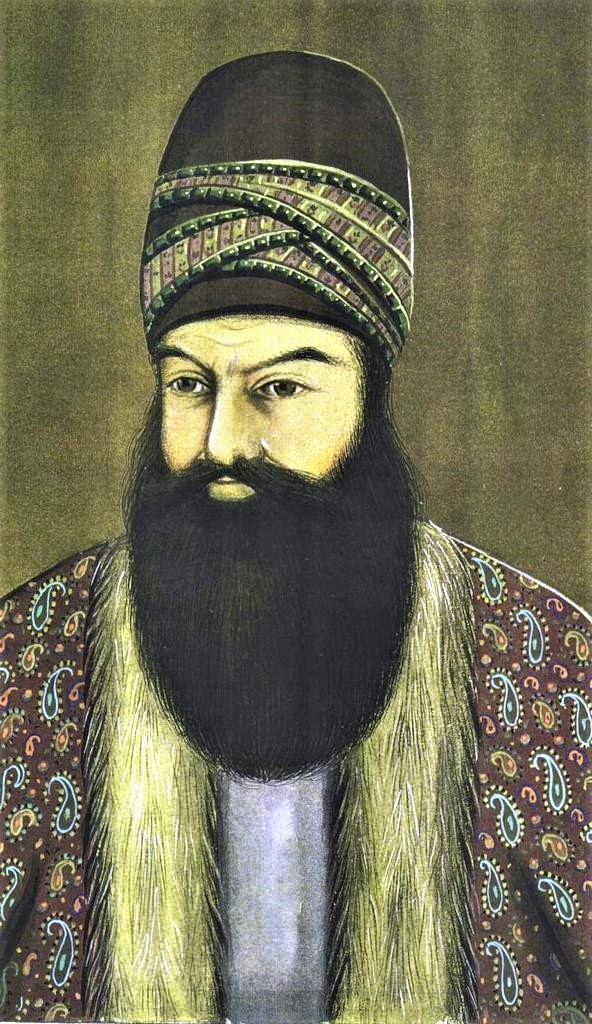
- Portrait of Isfahani by Majid Sadri

Grand Vizier of Iran
- In office 1819–1823
- Monarch: Fath-Ali Shah Qajar
- Preceded by: Mirza Shafi Mazandarani
- Succeeded by: Amin ol-Dowleh

Mostowfi ol-mamalek (comptroller general)
- In office 1806–1813
- Monarch: Fath-Ali Shah Qajar
- Preceded by: Mirza Yousof Ashrafi
- Succeeded by: Abdollah Khan Amin ol-Dowleh

Personal details
- Born: 1758 Isfahan, Zand Iran
- Died: 19 October 1823 (aged 64–65) Tehran, Qajar Iran
- Children: Amin ol-Dowleh

Hajji Mohammad Hossein Isfahani (Persian: محمدحسین صدر اصفهانی; 1758–1823) was an architect and political leader in Isfahan during the rule of Fath-Ali Shah Qajar, the second shah of Qajar Iran.

== Biography ==
He was born in Isfahan, Iran. In 1795 or 1796 he was named governor (beglarbegi) of Isfahan, Qom, and Kashan. In this role, Mohammad Hossein invested heavily in agriculture, which increased his own wealth and contributed to Isfahan's economic revival. In 1806, he was appointed mostowfi ol-mamalek, given the title Amin ol-Dowleh, and his son, Abd ol-Hossein Khan Isfahani succeeded him as beglarbegi. In 1809, Mohammad Hossein presented the Peacock Throne to the shah at the shah's marriage to Tavus Khanum Taj ol-Dowleh. In 1813, he was given the title Nizam ol-Dowleh. In 1818, Mirza Shafi Mazandarani died and Mohammad Hossein was appointed to the position of sadr-e a'zam which he held until his death in 1823.

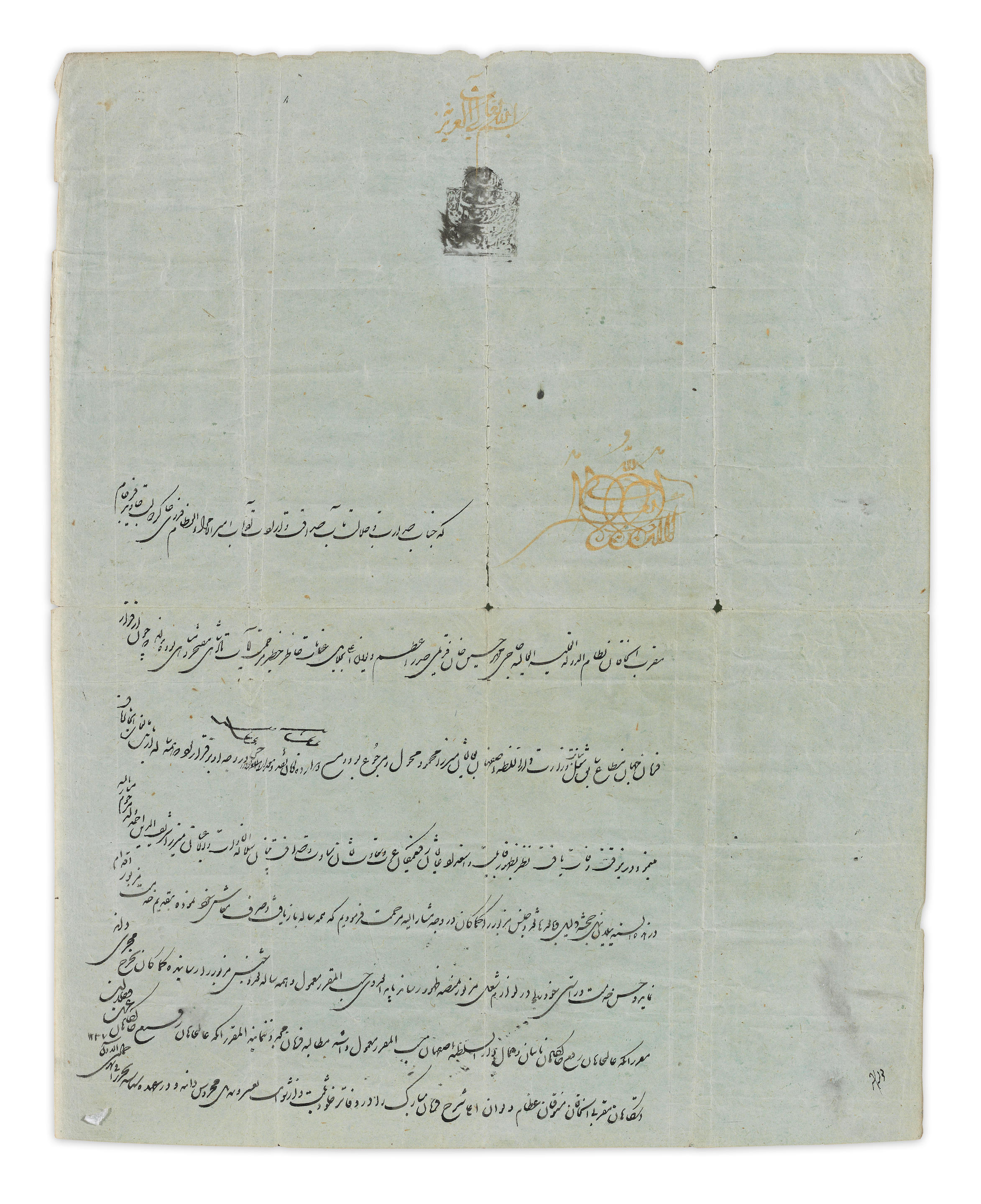
A January-February 1822 firman of Fath-Ali Shah Qajar (r. 1797–1834), stating that on the recommendation of Mohammad Hossein Khan [Sadr Esfahani], the post of deputy Minister of Isfahan and its annual salary is to be passed on to Mirza Sharif ol-Din Ahmad, whose father Mirza Mahmoud had recently died

Mohammad Hossein was close to Scottish diplomat John Macdonald Kinneir, whose reports play an important role in our understanding of Mohammad Hossein's career and building. Mohammad Hossein's term as governor led to the Qajar era's most extensive renovation and construction projects in Isfahan. He renovated the Jameh Mosque and the Madrasa-e Abdallah. He built three madrasas, including Sadr Madrasa, built a new palace, renovated many bazaars, restored and expanded the canal system, and enclosed slums. He removed the famous clock in Naqsh-e Jahan Square, rebuilt parts of the Safavid Haft Dast palace and renovated the Bagh-e Angurestan, the Hasht Behesht, and the Talar-e Tavila. He also built a new avenue through the Khaju quarter, Chahar Bagh-e Chinarsu (aka Bagh-e Now and Bagh-e Sadri). He also constructed the royal garden, Emarat-e Sadr (aka Emarat-e Now). Mohammad Hossein was not universally praised, Rostam al-Hokama considered him an "uneducated parvenu" and claimed that Mohammad Hossein and his brothers had stolen the possessions and royal insignia of Jafar Khan Zand when Zand fled to Shiraz in 1785.

Mohammad Hossein's son, Mohammad Ibrahim Khan Nazir ol-Dowleh, married one of the Fath Ali Shah's daughters (Khadijeh Soltan Begom, "Esmat-ed-Dowleh) and Khan's daughter married Hossein Ali Mirza Farmanfarma, governor of Shiraz. Khan died on 19 October 1823.

== See also ==
- Abdollah Khan Amin ol-Dowleh

== Sources ==
- Afnan, Mirza Habibu'llah, ed. The Genesis of the Bâabâi-Bahâaâi Faiths in Shâirâaz and Fâars. Vol. 122. Brill, 2008.
- Ansari, Passim, and Abd al-Husayn Sipanta, Tarikhshan-i awqaf-i Isfahan (Isfahan, 1364/1967), 4
- Lambton, Ann SK. Landlord and peasant in Persia: a study of land tenure and land revenue administration. IB Tauris, 1991.
- Walcher, Heidi (2001). "Face of the Seven Spheres: The Urban Morphology and Architecture of Nineteenth-Century Isfahan (Part Two)". Iranian Studies. 34 (1/4): 117–139. doi:10.1080/00210860108702000. JSTOR 4311425. S2CID 145640514.
