= Suren Pahlav =

Suren Pahlav was an Iranian nobleman from the Suren family. He may have been the wuzurg framadār (vizier or prime minister) of the Sasanian shah Bahram V, and thus probably also the successor of his kinsman Mihr Narseh. Nothing more is known about him.

== Sources ==
- Chaumont, Marie-Louise (2000). "FRAMADĀR". Encyclopaedia Iranica, Vol. X, Fasc. 2. pp. 125–126.
