= Agha Ebrahim Amin os-Soltan =

Iranian statesman (d. 1882/83)

- آقا ابراهیم امین‌السلطان
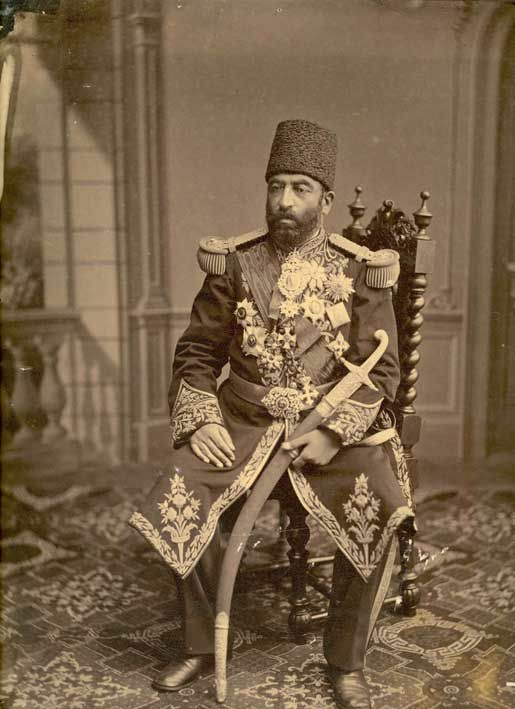
- Agha Ebrahim Amin os-Soltan in the 1870s

Personal details
- Died: 1882/83 Qajar Iran
- Children: Mirza Ali Asghar Khan Amin al-Soltan

Agha Ebrahim Amin os-Soltan (Persian: آقا ابراهیم امین‌السلطان; died 1882/83) was a high-ranking Iranian statesman during the reign of Naser al-Din Shah Qajar (r. 1848–1896). Despite never attempting to become premier, he was by 1882 the de facto most powerful figure in Iran. His second son Mirza Ali Asghar Khan Amin al-Soltan received most of his posts as well as his title.

== Biography ==
=== Background ===
Ebrahim's father, Zal Khan, was from a Christian background. The latter was either the son of a Georgian captured during the 1795 military expedition of Agha Mohammad Khan Qajar (r. 1794–1797) or an Armenian of modest origins from the area around Salmas in the Azerbaijan region.

=== Early career ===
Ebrahim was raised as a page (gholam-bacheh) in the household of the aristocrat Mohammad Qasem Khan Qovanlu and later under the latters son, Amir Soleyman Khan Etezad od-Dowleh. Alongside his three brothers, Ebrahim was then appointed to serve Qasem Khan Qovanlu's daughter, Malek Jahan Khanom, who was the mother of Naser al-Din Mirza, the future shah. Despite his court ties, severe poverty marked Ebrahim's early life. He spent part of this period as an apprentice at a shoe repair shop in the Tehran citadel. In 1847, as an assistant to his elder brother Eskandar, he started working in Naser al-Din Mirza's royal household staff at Tabriz.

In 1848, Ebrahim became the deputy-chief water bearer (na'eb saqqa-bashi) after Naser al-Din Mirza became the new shah. Amir Kabir, who seems to have held a low opinion of Ebrahim's close connection with Naser al-Din Shah, was reportedly "disgusted" by this appointment. During the 1850s and the early part of the 1860s, Ebrahim worked as a deputy and buying agent under Eskandar, who had risen to the rank of chief butler.

=== Rise and peak of career ===
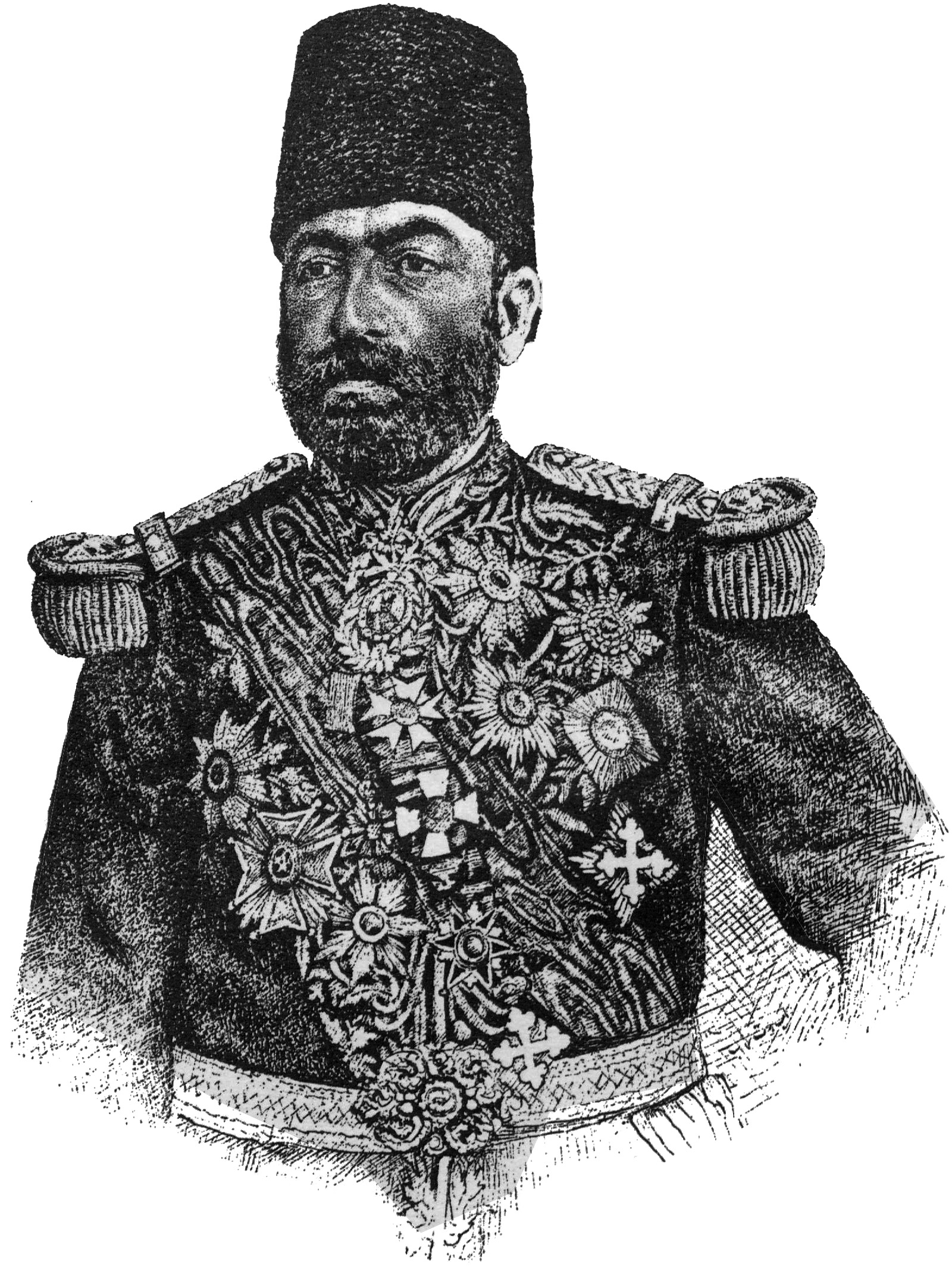
Portrait of Agha Ebrahim Amin os-Soltan by Abu Torab Ghaffari, dated 1882

After Eskandar's sudden death in the mid-1860s, Ebrahim inherited his position in the royal household staff. Ebrahim rose through the ranks of the court by acting as a link between government officials and Naser al-Din Shah. This advancement led to Ebrahim being rewarded with the newly created title of Amin os-Soltan. In 1871/72, Amin os-Soltan became the new head of the royal transport.

Amin os-Soltan took charge of over ten different court and other offices over the course of the next ten years. He became the new head of the royal treasury in 1875/76 and subsequently the head of the royal mint in 1878/79. His career peaked in 1882 when he became the de facto most powerful figure in Iran. He never tried to become the premier.

In 1882/83, Amin os-Soltan directed an extensive network in his role as joint minister of finance and the court. This network placed him in charge of the royal household, the royal guards, the customs department, the tribes in Tehran, production of building materials around Tehran, governorship of Tajrish village, and the construction as well as upkeep of royal buildings. A 1880/81 report by Mohammad Hasan Khan E'temad os-Saltaneh mentioned that Amin os-Soltan held 74 posts, which is either an exaggeration or includes minor roles under each department.

Amin os-Soltan died from tuberculosis in 1882/83. His second son Mirza Ali Asghar Khan Amin al-Soltan received most of his posts as well as his title.

== Legacy and assessment ==
Amin os-Soltan is depicted by nearly every writer of his era as a remarkably clever individual who had strong commercial instincts, great ability as a political strategist, and an understanding of Naser al-Din Shah's mindset. Essential to Amin os-Soltan's career advancement were his clear signs of allegiance to Naser al-Din Shah along with his attentiveness to the latter's personal and economic welfare. Some of Amin os-Soltan's presentations of honesty and loyalty to Naser al-Din Shah has been alleged of feigned displays by some stories.

In the final quarter of the 19th century, the traditional divani elite was progressively overtaken by a new class who often came from modest origins as seen by the career advancement of Amin os-Soltan.

== Sources ==
- Amanat, Yuri (1989). "Amīn-al-solṭān, Āqā Ebrāhīm". In Yarshater, Ehsan (ed.). Encyclopædia Iranica (Online ed.). Encyclopædia Iranica Foundation. ISBN 978-0710090904.
