= Shahram Jalilian =

Iranian Iranologist and historian (born 1978)

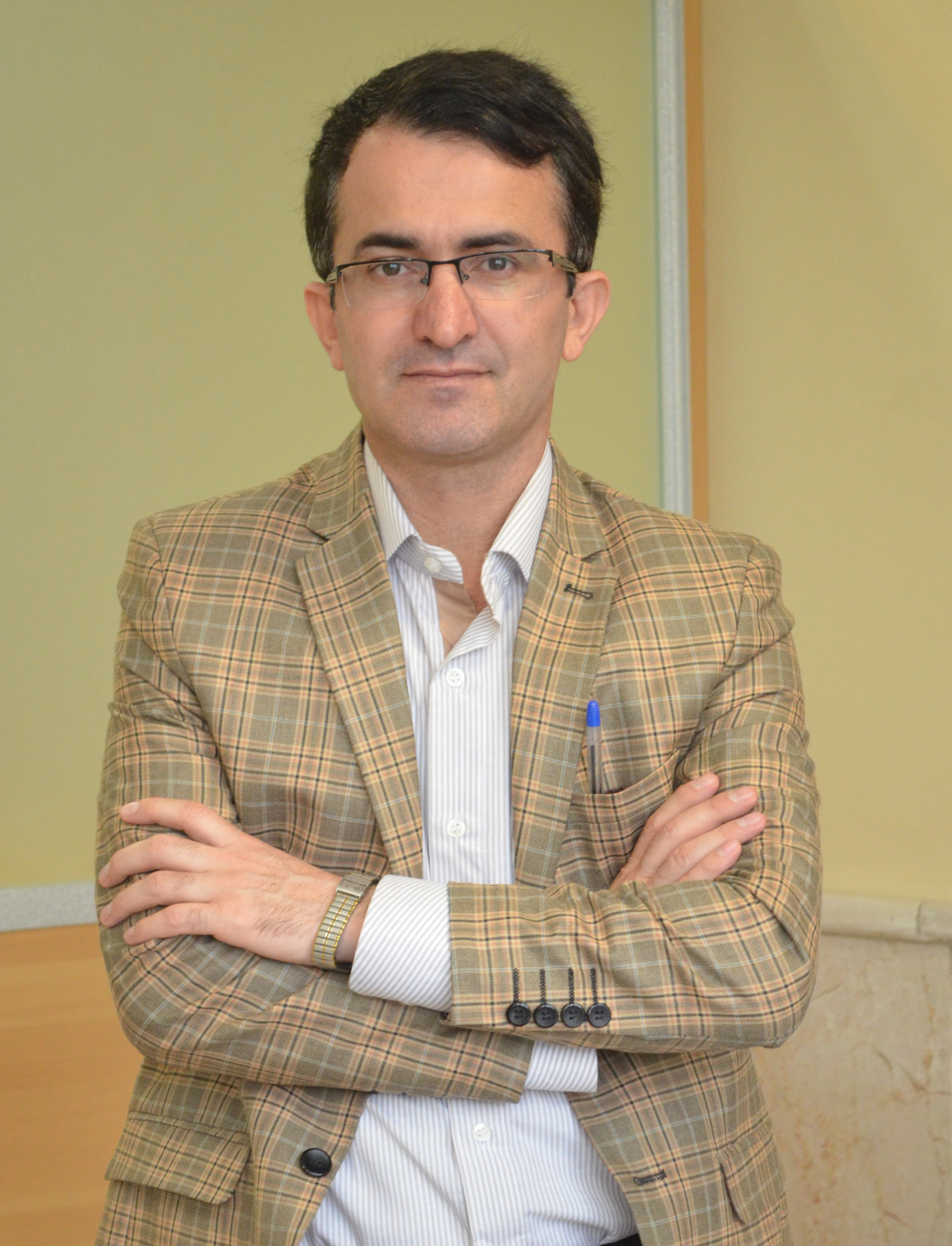
- Born: 8 May 1978 (age 47); Khorramshahr, Iran
- Occupations: Iranologist, writer, translator and academic staff
- Website: Official website

Shahram Jalilian (Persian: شهرام جلیلیان) (born 8 May 1978) is an Iranian Iranologist and historian. His higher education was in Shahid Beheshti University, and he took his doctorate in the History of Ancient Iran at the University of Tehran. He is now the associate professor in the history of Ancient Iran at Shahid Chamran University of Ahvaz.

== Books ==
- Shahram Jalilian, Bisotun, Tehran: 2012
- R.S. Murray, Ancient Iran, Translated by, Tehran: Faravahar Publication, 2001.
- Touraj Daryaee, Cities of Iranshahr, Translated by Shahram Jalilian, Tehran: Toos Publication, 2010.
- Matthew Stolper, History of Elam, Translated by Shahram Jalilian, Tehran: Toos Publication, 2011.
- Alireza Shapour Shahbazi, An Essay About a symbol of the Achaemenid؛ Ahvrhmzda, Khvrnh or Faravahar? Translated by Shahram Jalilian, Tehran: Shirazeh Publication, 2011.
- Touraj Daryaee, On the Explanation of Chess and Backgammon, Translated by, Tehran: Toos Publication, 2013.

== See also ==
- Iranology
- Persian history
