= Ibn al-Muqaffa' =

Persian translator and author

Abdullah Ibn al-Muqaffa
- ابن المقفع
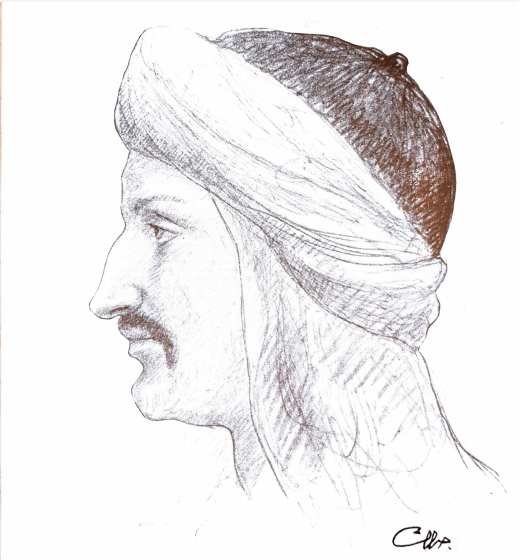
- Ibn al-Muqaffa; by Khalil Gibran.
- Born: Jur, Fars, Umayyad Caliphate (modern-day Firuzabad, Iran)
- Died: 139 AH (756/757 CE) or 142 AH (759/760 CE); Basra, Abbasid Caliphate
- Occupations: Author and translator

Abū Muhammad ʿAbd Allāh Rūzbih ibn Dādūya (Arabic: ابو محمد عبدالله روزبه ابن دادويه), born Rōzbih pūr-i Dādōē (Persian: روزبه پور دادویه), more commonly known as Ibn al-Muqaffaʿ (Arabic: ابن المقفع; died c. 756/759), was a Persian translator, philosopher, author and thinker who wrote in the Arabic language. He bore the name Rōzbeh/Rūzbeh before his comparatively late conversion to Islam from Manichaeism.

== Biography ==
Ibn al-Muqaffa, though a resident of Basra, was originally from the town of Goor (or Gur, Firuzabad, Fars) in the Iranian province of Fars and was born into a family of Persian stock. He was a native speaker of Middle Persian and a non-native speaker of Arabic; Ibn al-Muqaffa composed his Arabic works during a period when the rules of Classical Arabic were still taking shape and the Arabic linguistic tradition was just emerging. His father had been a state official in charge of taxes under the Umayyads, and after being accused and convicted of embezzling some of the money entrusted to him, was punished by the ruler by having his hand crushed, hence the name Muqaffa (shrivelled hand).

Ibn al-Muqaffa served in secretarial posts under the Umayyad governors of Shapur and Kirman. Unlike his other colleagues, he escaped persecution at the hands of Abbasids after their overthrow of the Umayyad dynasty. He later returned to Basra and served as a secretary under Isa ibn Ali and Sulayman ibn Ali, the uncles of the Abbasid caliph al-Mansur.

After their brother Abdallah ibn Ali made an abortive bid for the throne, they asked Ibn al-Muqaffa to write a letter to the Caliph to not retaliate against his uncle and pardon him. The language of the letter offended al-Mansur, who wished to get rid of Ibn al-Muqaffa. He was reportedly executed in Basra in 757 AD for heresy by al-Mansur.

A defense of dualism and a few lines of prose written in imitation of the Quran have been ascribed to him. Whether authentic or not, and despite his conversion to Islam, these texts contributed to his posthumous reputation as a Zoroastrian heretic.

== Literary career ==
Ibn al-Muqaffa's translation of Kalīla wa-Dimna from Middle Persian was highly influential in the development of Arabic literary prose. According to scholar David A. Wacks, Ibn al-Muqaffa pioneered the introduction of literary prose narrative to Arabic literature, which subsequently paved the way for later innovators such as al-Hamadani and al-Saraqusti to adapt traditional oral narratives into written literary fiction.

== Works ==
=== Translations and adaptations ===
Logic translations: He translated several foundational Aristotelian logic texts, including parts of the Organon such as the Categories (al-Qatighuriyas), De Interpretatione (al-Ibarah), and Prior Analytics (al-Qiyas). While later Islamic tradition often associated early logical summaries with his name, his work laid the groundwork for Arabic philosophical terminology before the major translation movement.

Kalīla wa-Dimna: His most famous work, an Arabic translation of a Middle Persian collection of animal fables (which were primarily of Indian origin, tracing back to the Panchatantra). The Middle Persian version, originally compiled by the Sasanian physician Borzuya, is now lost, making Ibn al-Muqaffa's Arabic translation the foundational text that preserved this global heritage. He introduced the work with his own prologue and is credited with adding original stories. Ibn al-Muqaffa's Arabic rendering served as the definitive master text from which almost all later translations were derived, including subsequent Arabic versions, the later Syriac version, and the medieval Greek, Persian (12th century), Hebrew, Latin, and Castilian translations. His translation was highly regarded for its idiomatic, clear expression and plain syntactical structures, playing a pivotal role in establishing the standard for early Arabic literary prose.

Ibn al-Muqaffa's translation of Kalīla wa-Dimna functioned primarily as court literature intended to illustrate political and social conduct. A prose Persian translation of the Arabic text emerged in the 10th century, which Rudaki (d. 941–942) subsequently adapted into verse. Both early Persian versions are largely lost, surviving only as scattered lines preserved in other sources. A later Persian prose translation was completed by Abu'l-Maʿālī Nasr-Allāh Ibn Mohammad Shirazi and dedicated to the Ghaznavid ruler Bahramshah.

Khwaday-Namag: Ibn al-Muqaffa' is traditionally credited with producing an Arabic adaptation of the Khwaday-Namag (Book of Kings), described in later literature as a late Sasanian chronicle of pre-Islamic Persian kings and warriors. However, modern historical scholarship questions the existence of a single, unified Middle Persian original text. Scholars indicate that the "Khwaday-Namag" likely represented an oral tradition or a loose genre of historical narratives rather than a fixed official book, and that Arabic compilers and translators heavily shaped the surviving narratives. Traditional accounts state Ibn al-Muqaffa' modified the narrative and inserted specific accounts, such as the history of Mazdak, which subsequently informed later Muslim historians. Like the supposed original, Ibn al-Muqaffa's Arabic version is not extant. Potential fragments or references are preserved without direct ascription in later works, such as the Oyun al-akhbar and Ketab al-maʿaref of Ibn Qutayba (d. 889). Other books: Ibn al-Nadim attributes several other Arabic translations of Middle Persian administrative and historical texts to Ibn al-Muqaffa', notably the Āʾīn-nāma (Book of Customs), Kitāb al-tāj (Book of the Crown), and Kitāb Mazdak. While the complete translations are lost, fragments are preserved without direct ascription in Ibn Qutayba's Oyun al-akhbar. The Āʾīn-nāma extracts detail Sasanian court protocol, military tactics, and recreational activities such as polo. The Kitāb al-tāj, described by Ibn al-Nadim as a biography of Khosrow I, appears in Ibn Qutayba's citations as a mirror for princes concerning Khosrow II. The Kitāb Mazdak provided an account of the revolutionary religious leader executed in 531.

Another major translation attributed to him is the Letter of Tansar (Nāma-ye Tansar), a political treatise purportedly written by the Zoroastrian high priest under Ardashir I. Ibn al-Muqaffa's Arabic text is lost, but the core content survives through a 13th-century Persian translation by Ibn Isfandiyar. The letter functions as an ideological defense of Ardashir's usurpation and his establishment of a highly rigid, four-tiered social caste system. Traditional sources note that Ibn al-Muqaffa' inserted Quranic and Biblical verses into the text, adapting the political framework for an Islamic readership.

Modern historiography approaches the broader corpus of Sasanian literature translated by Ibn al-Muqaffa' with heavy skepticism. Academic consensus indicates that many texts classified as Pahlavi translations were heavily redacted, compiled, or entirely fabricated during the late Umayyad and early Abbasid periods. Rather than being faithful reproductions of ancient Sasanian documents, these works were often produced by the secretarial class (kuttab) to influence contemporary Islamic political administration by projecting idealized, autocratic governance onto a mythical Persian past.

=== Original works ===
Two major preceptive works in Arabic are traditionally ascribed to Ibn al-Muqaffa': al-Adab al-kabīr (The Major Adab) and al-Adab al-saghir (The Minor Adab). While the former is widely accepted as authentic, the authorship of al-Adab al-saghir remains disputed within modern scholarship, with many historians classifying it as a later compilation or pseudepigraphical.

Al-Adab al-kabīr serves as a foundational text in Arabic adab (belles-lettres and conduct) literature, functioning primarily as a mirror for princes and a practical manual for courtiers. The work is structured into sections addressing different echelons of power. The initial portions are directed toward a prince, outlining the fundamentals of statecraft, the importance of cultivating moral aides, the necessity of accepting constructive counsel, and the mechanics of maintaining authority.

The subsequent sections function as a pragmatic survival guide for state officials and the secretarial class (kuttab). It provides direct advice on navigating the volatile environment of the caliphal court, managing relations with rulers, and avoiding political pitfalls. The text places significant emphasis on interpersonal dynamics among peers, advocating for the cultivation of permanent friendships grounded in fidelity and loyalty.

Stylistically, al-Adab al-kabīr represents a pivotal transition in early Arabic prose. It integrates the structural parallelism found in early Islamic oratory (khutbah) with thematic elements of historical administrative traditions, establishing a benchmark for secular didactic literature in the early Abbasid era.

The Risāla fī al-Ṣaḥāba (Letter on the Entourage) is a political memorandum addressed to the second Abbasid caliph, Al-Mansur. Modern historians analyze the text as a foundational document in early Islamic administrative thought, offering practical strategies for consolidating caliphal authority following the Abbasid revolution. The treatise addresses systemic administrative challenges, proposing specific reforms for military logistics, the taxation system (kharaj), and the careful selection of state officials.

The most historically significant aspect of the Risāla, widely highlighted by legal scholars, is its explicit proposal for the state codification of Islamic law. Observing the severe divergence in legal rulings across different provinces, Ibn al-Muqaffa' advised the caliph to review varying judicial decisions and enact a standardized legal code to impose imperial uniformity. Although the Abbasid state did not implement this recommendation, academics cite the proposal as a critical early attempt to centralize judicial authority and resolve legal discrepancies within the empire.

Several other minor works and fragments are attributed to Ibn al-Muqaffa', though their authenticity is highly contested in modern scholarship. Two such works survive only as fragments preserved in later refutations. The first is an apologia for Manichaeism, the authorship of which remains debated. The second is the Muʿāraḍat al-Qurʾān (Imitation of the Quran). Scholar Josef van Ess analyzed these fragments and classified them as a contemporary stylistic literary exercise designed to demonstrate that prose comparable to the Quran could be composed.

Other epistles and aphoristic collections bearing his name include the Yatīma thāniya (a short treatise on rulers and subjects), the longer Yatīmat al-sulṭān, and a collection of maxims titled Ḥikam. Academic consensus generally views the latter two as pseudepigraphical compilations misattributed to him by later authors, while the authenticity of the Yatīma thāniya remains uncertain.

== Legacy and commemoration ==
Ibn al-Muqaffa' occupies a foundational position in the development of early Arabic literary prose (adab). Modern historiography and literary criticism approach his extensive attributed corpus with strict scrutiny. Academic consensus indicates that Ibn al-Muqaffa' became a retrospective figurehead for the early Islamic secretarial class (kuttab). Consequently, numerous later political tracts, translations, and pieces of wisdom literature were falsely attributed to him to grant them historical prestige and authority. Scholars such as Charles Pellat and Dimitri Gutas highlight that a significant portion of the Sasanian and philosophical translations bearing his name are pseudepigraphical, reflecting later Abbasid administrative ideologies.

The Bosnian poet Dzevad Karahasan wrote a play about al-Muqaffa. The world premiere was performed in 1994 during the civil war in Bosnia-Hercegovina by the Bosnian actors Zijah Sokolović and Selma Alispahić from the National Theatre of Sarajevo under the direction of Herbert Gantschacher in a production of the Austrian theatre ARBOS – Company for Music and Theatre in Vienna.

== See also ==
- Al-Adab al-Kabīr
- Mirrors for princes

== Sources ==
- Brown, Daniel W. (2009). A New Introduction to Islam (2nd ed.). Wiley-Blackwell. ISBN 978-1405158077.
- Daryaee, Touraj (2012). The Oxford Handbook of Iranian History. Oxford University Press. ISBN 9780190208820.
- Latham, Derek James (1982–2021). "EBN AL-MOQAFFAʿ, ABŪ MOḤAMMAD ʿABD-ALLĀH RŌZBEH". In Yarshater, Ehsan (ed.). Encyclopædia Iranica. London and New York: Routledge & Kegan Paul. pp. 39–43.
- Lewis, Bernarded; Lambton, Ann K. S.; Holt, Peter Malcolm (1986). Islamic society and civilization, Volume 2B (1st ed.). Cambridge University Press. ISBN 978-0-521-21949-5.
- Mallette, Karla (2021). Lives of the Great Languages: Arabic and Latin in the Medieval Mediterranean. University of Chicago Press. ISBN 978-0226796062.
