= Wuzurg framadar =

Highest office in the Sasanian Empire

Wuzurg framadār (Middle Persian: LBʾ plmtʾr, meaning "the grand commander or the grand commanding body") was a Sasanian office which was equivalent to the office of Grand Vizier in the later Islamic period.

== List ==
- Abarsam, active during the reign of Ardashir I.
- Khosrow Yazdegerd under Yazdegerd I
- Mihr Narseh under Yazdegerd I and Bahram V
- Suren Pahlav under Bahram V, possibly Mihr Narseh's direct successor
- Bozorgmehr under Kavad I and Khosrow I
- Izadgushasp under Khosrow I
- Piruz Khosrow under Kavadh II and Ardashir III
- Mah-Adhur Gushnasp under Ardashir III
- Farrukh Hormizd under Boran
