= Arthur Christensen =

Danish academic and writer (1875–1945)

Arthur Emanuel Christensen
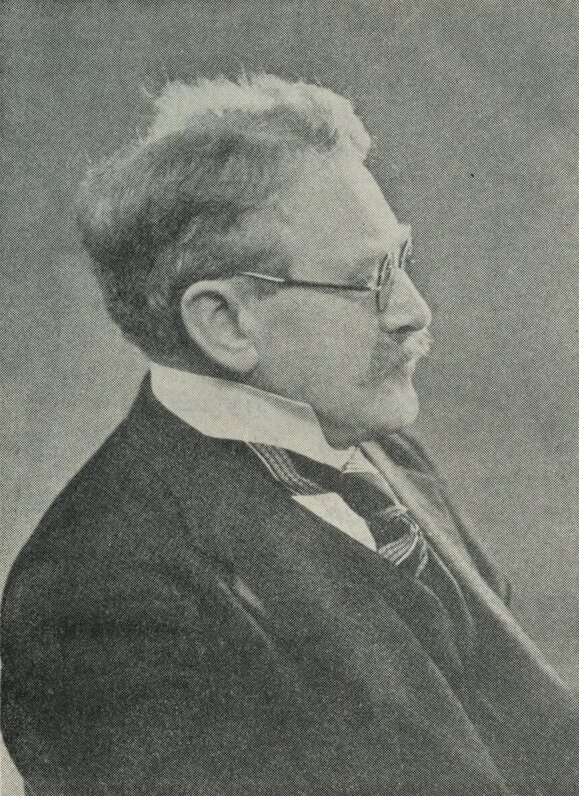
- Born: 9 January 1875; Copenhagen, Denmark
- Died: 31 March 1945 (aged 70); Copenhagen, Denmark

Arthur Emanuel Christensen (9 January 1875 – 31 March 1945) was a Danish orientalist and scholar of Iranian philology and folklore. He is best known for his works on the Iranian history, mythology, religions, medicine and music.

== Biography ==
Christensen was born in Copenhagen in 1875. He received his doctorate in 1903. The book One Thousand and One Nights ignited his interest to the Middle East. The subject of his doctorate dissertation was written about Omar Khayyam, a renowned Persian polymath. In 1919 he was promoted to the professorship at the University of Copenhagen, being the first Danish academic to hold this title in the field of Iranian philology.

== Selected bibliography ==
- Recherches sur les Rubāʻiyat de ʻOmar Ḫayyām [Research on the Rubā‘iyāt of Omar Khayyam] (in French). Heidelberg: C. Winter. 1905. LCCN 07032000.
- "Orientalsk musikkultur" [Oriental Music Culture]. Ord och Bild (in Swedish). Stockholm: 463–474. 1910.
- Gatha Society, ed. (1918). "Some Notes on Persian Melody-Names of the Sasanian Period". Dastur Hoshang Memorial Volume: Being Papers on Iranian Subjects. Bombay: Fort Printing Press. OCLC 500234890.
- L'Iran sous les Sassanides [Iran under the Sassanids] (in French) (1st ed.). Copenhagen; Paris: Levin & Munksgaard; P. Geuthner. 1936. LCCN 37013450.
