= Farhad Mirza =

Iranian Qajar-era prince and statesmen (1818–1888)

Farhad Mirza فرهاد میرزا
- Mo'tamed ed-Dowleh; Nayeb ol-Eyaleh
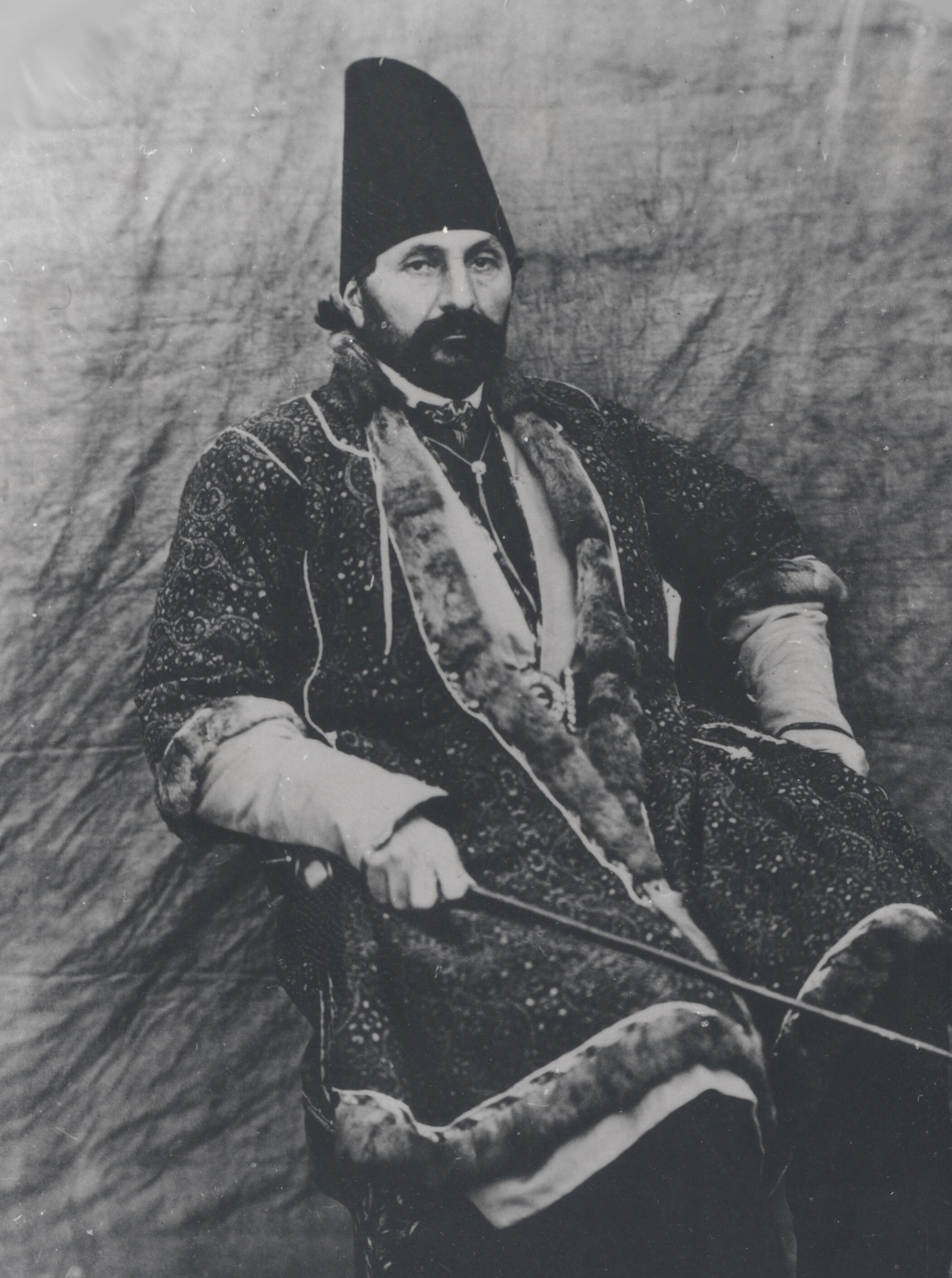
- Photograph of Farhad Mirza, Golestan Palace Library
- Born: 1818
- Died: 1888 (aged 69–70)
- Issue: See below
- Dynasty: Qajar
- Father: Abbas Mirza
- Religion: Twelver Shia Islam
- Occupation: Statesman, writer

Farhad Mirza (Persian: فرهاد میرزا; 1818 – 1888) was a Qajar prince, administrator, and writer in 19th-century Iran. He was the fifteenth son of Crown Prince Abbas Mirza (died 1833) and younger brother of the third Qajar shah (king) of Iran, Mohammad Shah Qajar (r. 1834–1848).

Similar to his brother Bahman Mirza, Farhad Mirza was widely recognized for his passion for gathering Persian and Arabic manuscripts. He gathered one of the most valuable personal libraries in Iran throughout the years, but after his death, his belongings became progressively scattered.

== Biography ==
=== Early career in Southern Iran ===
In 1835, seventeen-year-old Farhad Mirza was appointed to manage the affairs of Lorestan and Khuzestan by his brother Bahram Mirza, whom the newly crowned Mohammad Shah had recently placed in charge of the region. Farhad Mirza remained in Southern Iran for two years and ended tenure successfully, for this Mohammad Shah appointed him as governor of Tehran twice. First was in July-August 1837, when Shah launched an campaign to Herat, Second was in December 1839 and January 1840, when Shah marched to Isfahan for suppress revolt of powerful cleric, Mohammad Bagher Shafti. Sixteen months later, Mohammad Shah and his Grand vizier Haji Mirza Aqasi, returned to capital. To the Shah's delight, Farhad Mirza had ably maintained peace and order throughout their absence.

=== Political crisis and exile ===
Haji Mirza Aqasi lacked the close bond with Farhad Mirza that he shared with Mohammad Shah and Farhad's older brother, Fereydun Mirza—both of whom he had personally tutored earlier in his career. Mohammad Shah's affection for Farhad Mirza likely unnerved the manipulative grand vizier, who sought to maintain strict control over Shah's relationships. Moreover, Aqasi viewed Farhad Mirza's capability and assertiveness as a potential threat. Nevertheless, as a vizier who intended well for his country, he maintained a functional working relationship with him, Aqasi must also have felt some gratification to see Farhad Mirza's efforts bearing results. In 1840, Farhad Mirza was appointed Deputy governor of Fars to Crown prince Naser al-Din Mirza, formerly giving him title Nayeb ol-Eyaleh (Persian: نایب‌الایاله, lit. 'Deputy of the Governor'), who had succeeded Fereydun Mirza, on advice of Aqasi, who wished to put Farhad Mirza to test. Farhad Mirza's brief 17-month term in Fars disappointed Haji Mirza Aqasi. Soon after taking from office, and before Naser al-Din Mirza's arrival in Shiraz on October-November 1841, Farhad Mirza launched an eight-month military campaign from Kohgiluyeh to Borazjan, Bushehr and finally Fars. With the help of local commanders, he punished Mamasani Lura who robbed the Qashqai tribes and defied the government, collected large amounts of overdue taxes, including 100,000 tomans.

== Accession of new Shah and exile ==
With the death of Mohammad Shah on 5 September 1848, until arrival of Naser al-Din Shah, now the new shah, in Tehran, Mahd-e Olya became the most powerful figure at court. She immediately asked two of her brothers to arrest and blind Naser al-Din Shah's younger half-brother, Abbas Mirza Molk-Ara, whom she considered a potential source of trouble. Farhad Mirza found out about the plan and informed his nephew at once, urging him to seek British protection. He personally took Abbas Mirza's written request for political asylum to British envoy, Colonel Francis Farrant, who immediately approved it and declared that Abbas Mirza was under the protection of the British government. Farhad Mirza's involvement in this affair further isolated him at court. Left vulnerable to his rivals, he was targeted again on August 1852, when his enemies implicated him in the Bábi attempt on Naser al-Din Shah's life. As punishment, he was ordered into house arrest at Taleqan. Before royal guards could arrest Farhad Mirza, He sought asylum at the British legation. The British minister plenipotentiary, Justin Sheil, secured a pledge from Grand Vizier Mirza Aqa Khan Nuri guaranteeing Farhad Mirza's life and property if he accepted exile. Reassured, Farhad Mirza surrendered and departed for Talaqan on 27 November 1852, where he spent his internal exile reading and pursuing scholarly interests.

== Relations with Britain ==
However, in 1855, the harsh climate of Talaqan severely affected his health, prompting him to ask Naser al-Din Shah for permission for return to Tehran. Although his petition was backed by the British Chargé d'affaires, William Taylour Thomson, Shah denied it. Undeterred, Farhad Mirza defied the order and fled Talaqan directly to the British legation in Tehran. In response, Shah ordered the confiscation of his property, while Thomson went so far as to threaten to shoot any royal officers sent to arrest the prince. A heated exchange of diplomatic notes followed, with the Persian government insisting that the Shah possessed absolute right to discipline any subject without foreign interference. Realizing the diplomatic standoff would not resolve his plight and fearing permanent loss of his wealth and status—Farhad Mirza chose to leave the legation and beg the Shah for forgiveness, which he granted on 8 January 1855.

=== Anglo-Persian tensions ===
Tensions escalated with the arrival of Sir Charles Murray, the new British envoy in Tehran, who had come to safeguard British interests against possible Persian moves on Herat but had angered the Shah over critical articles in The Times. In a letter to Mirza Aqa Khan dated 28 June 1855, Murray declared Farhad Mirza under British protection. Mirza Aqa Khan rejected the declaration as null and void, shifting from a respectful to openly derogatory tone toward Farhad Mirza and calling him ignorant and unfit for office. Although it is unclear how much longer Farhad Mirza remained at the legation, Britain maintained his protected status until early December 1856, when Consul Richard Stevens left Tehran and diplomatic relations completely broke down. With the outbreak of Anglo-Persian War, Farhad Mirza immediately wrote a letter to French Chargé d'affaires, Arthur de Gobineau, who was now responsible for defending interests of British in country, denying that he was a British protege and pledging his full allegiance to shah.

== Return to political offices ==
Illustration of Mo'tamed ed-Dowleh by Abu'l-Hasan Sani al-Mulk, from Dowlat-e Elliye-ye Iran (newspaper)

It took Naser al-Din Shah nearly five years to grant Farhad Mirza another major post. On February 1862, Shah bestowed upon him the title Mo'tamed ed-Dowleh (Persian: ‌معتمدالدوله, lit. 'Trustee of the State') and appointed him governor of Lorestan and Khuzestan. By early 1863, Shah recalled him to Tehran for serve on the Consultative Council of the Government, a body established in September 1858 to replace grand vizierate.

=== Governorship of Kurdistan and Fars ===
Farhad Mirza served nearly four years on that relatively ineffective council, aligning with its conservative faction. On early 1868, he was appointed governor of Kurdistan and dispatched to Sanandaj. Determined to make an immediate, intimidating impression, he lured the region's most feared rebel into a trap and hanged him in front of his stunned troops. This incident along with similar acts earned him a lasting reputation for brutality. According to the chronicler E'temad os-Saltaneh, Farhad Mirza himself boasted to Naser al-Din Shah that he had executed six hundred people. A British agent who witnessed Farhad Mirza's second term as governor of Fars from 1876 to 1881, shortly after his return from the Hajj provided a chilling account of widespread torture, ruthless reprisals and brutal executions carried out by the governor's forces. The agent also reports on prevalent corruption, bribery and virtual extortion in name of tax collection. The shah was happy to see revenues coming in. In mid-1879 shah wrote to Farhad Mirza, It is enough for us that you are maintaining order in the area, and you send your taxes on time or early, and you do not owe [us anything] for the three years that you have been the governor [of the area]. Farhad Mirza reacted with hostility whenever his autocratic methods were questioned or when mechanisms were introduced to address public grievances. For instance, 1878/1879, when Mirza Yusuf Ashtiani implored him to show greater tolerance toward his subjects and heed the Shah's suggestions, Farhad Mirza famously retorted that he was "Hakim, not the president of a republic." Similarly, when central government mandated installation of "justice boxes" (Sanduq-e Adalat) in major mosques to collect public petitions, Farhad Mirza vehemently rejected initiative, threatening to resign if boxes were placed in Fars.

=== Conflict with Mirza Hosein Khan Sepahsalar ===
With the viziriate of Mirza Hosein Khan Sepahsalar on late November 1871, a new chapter began in political career of Farhad Mirza. The grand vizier's progressive ideas and plans for the country stood in contrast to Farhad Mirza's highly conservative religious views on administration of Persia. Farhad Mirza himself saw the reformist vizier as an obliterator of the "foundation of Muslim Sharia", who was guilty of spreading word "liberty" among the people.

Farhad Mirza's hostility toward Sepahsalar deepened during 1871–1872, when grand vizier began reviewing and occasionally overturning rulings from Fars court. Yet despite their friction, Naser al-Din Shah's trust in Farhad Mirza remained intact. On late 1872, shortly after granting Reuter Concession and preparing for his first European tour, Shah appointed Farhad Mirza head of the cabinet to oversee Regent Kamran Mirza Nayeb es-Saltaneh. Nevertheless, both the Shah and Sepahsalar acted cautiously, issuing a strict administrative manual that clearly delineated the duties of Farhad Mirza and Kamran Mirza to be followed "without dissent". Five months the Shah and grand vizier spent touring Europe provided ample opportunity for Farhad Mirza and Sepahsalar's other opponents who also enjoyed Russian support to unite against him. Immediately upon royal party's return on September 1873, coalition demanded Sepahsalar's dismissal. Sepahsalar himself believed that Farhad Mirza had gone so far as to plot his assassination. Farhad Mirza's triumphant reaction to Sepahsalar's dismissal was starkly captured in a personal marginal note written on flyleaf of a manuscript from his library. In it, he likened destructive impact of Sepahsalar's tenure to that of Mongol conquests, noting with characteristic moral superiority that God would surely reward everyone who had contributed to the grand vizier's downfall. Before any divine reward arrived, however, conspirators faced the immediate censure of Shah, who had quickly come to regret accepting his grand vizier’s resignation. In response, Naser al-Din Shah banished Farhad Mirza back to Kurdistan, removing him from his post shortly thereafter.

== Later governorship and death ==
Illustration of Mo'tamed ed-Dowleh by Abu Torab Ghaffari, dated 1883.

In September 1875 Farhad Mirza performed the pilgrimage to Mecca and in 1876 he accepted Sepahsalar's offer to become the governor of Fars, provided central government did not interfere with his rule. Eager to establish order in region, Sepahsalar secured Naser al-Din Shah's approval, and for next five years Farhad Mirza became supreme governor of Fars for the second time. In 1881 Farhad Mirza was summoned to Tehran for become a member of Council of the State, he held until his death in 1888.

== Children ==
Farhad Mirza had several children, including:

Farhad Mirza (left) and son (?)

1. Mehrmah Khanum Ismat al-Saltaneh – Initially married to Qavam al-Dowleh Ashtiani, then to Mirza Mousa Vazir Lashkar Ashtiani, followed by Abd al-Wahhab Khan Asaf al-Dowleh, and later to Hossein Khan Hessam al-Molk.
2. Soltan Oways Mirza
3. Hormat al-Dowleh – Initially married to Ehtesham al-Dowleh and later to Mirza Mahmoud Vazir.
4. Abd al-Ali Mirza
5. Shams al-Dowleh – Wife of Sultan Hossein Mirza Nayer al-Dowleh. She had two daughters:
  - Fasl Bahar Khanum Iran al-Dowleh, who was a writer, painter, and poet.
  - Mehr Afrouz Khanum Shams al-Saltaneh, who married Mohammad Ali Khan Khazen al-Molk.

== Sources ==
- Eslami, Kambiz (1999). "Farhād Mīrzā Moʿtamad-al-Dawla". Encyclopaedia Iranica.
- E'temad os-Saltaneh, Mohammad Hasan Khan (1988). Rabbani-Aleshahr, Mohammad-Esma'il (ed.). تاریخ منتظم ناصری [The Ordered History of Naser al-Din Shah] (in Persian). Tehran: Dunya-ye Ketab.
- Bamdad, Mehdi (1972). شرح حال رجال ایران در قرن ۱۲ و ۱۳ و ۱۴ هجری [Biographies of Iranian Notables in the 12th, 13th and 14th Centuries AH] (PDF) (in Persian). Vol. 1. Zavvar.
- Madayehnegar Tafreshi, Mirza Ebrahim (1984). Kianfar, Jamshid (ed.). تذکره مدایح‌نگار [Biography of Madayehnegar] (in Persian). Tehran: Asatir.
- Watson, Robert Grant (1866). A History of Persia from the Beginning of the Nineteenth Century to the Year 1858. London: Smith, Elder & Co.
- Divanbeygi Shirazi, Ahmad (1986). Nava'i, Abd al-Hoseyn (ed.). حدیقة الشعراء [Garden of Poets] (in Persian). Tehran: Zarrin.
- Fasa'i, Hasan (1988). Rastegar Fasa'i, Mansur (ed.). فارسنامه ناصری [History of Fars Under Naser al-Din Shah] (in Persian). Tehran: Amir Kabir Publishers.
- Elgood, Cyril (2010). A Medical History of Persia and the Eastern Caliphate: From the Earliest Times Until the Year A.D. 1932. Cambridge: Cambridge University Press. ISBN 978-1-108-01588-2. OCLC 5788500.
- Molk-Ara, Abbas Mirza (1976). Nava'i, Abd al-Hoseyn (ed.). شرح حال عباس میرزا ملک‌آرا [Biography of Abbas Mirza Molkara'i] (in Persian). Tehran: Babak.
- Navvab Safa, Ebrahim (1987). شرح حال فرهاد میرزا معتمدالدوله [Biography of Farhad Mirza Mo'tamad al-Dowleh] (in Persian). Tehran: Zavvar.
- Browne, Edward Granville (1984). A Year Amongst the Persians: Impressions as to the Life, Character, and Thought of the People of Persia, Received During Twelve Months' Residence in that Country in the Years 1887–1888. London and New York: Century Publishing. ISBN 978-0-7126-0026-2.
- Mohaddeth Urmavi, Mir Jalal al-Din, ed. (1981). مکاتبات ایران و انگلیس درباره پناهندگی فرهاد میرزا [Anglo-Iranian Correspondence Regarding the Asylum of Farhad Mirza] (in Persian).
- Sepehr, Mohammad-Taqi Khan (1998). Kianfar, Jamshid (ed.). ناسخ التواریخ: تاریخ قاجاریه [The Abrogation of Histories: History of the Qajar Dynasty] (in Persian). Vol. 2. Tehran: Asatir.
- Esfahanian, Karim; Rowshani, Za'faran, eds. (1978). اسناد تاریخی دوران قاجاریه: فرامین و اسناد فرهاد میرزا معتمدالدوله [Historical Documents of the Qajar Era: Decrees and Documents of Farhad Mirza Mo'tamad al-Dowleh] (in Persian). Tehran: Tehran University Press / Intisharat-e Bunyad-e Afshar.
- Khormuji, Mohammad Ja'far (1965). Afshar, Iraj (ed.). حقایق الاخبار ناصری [History of the Qajars: The Truth of Naser-al-Din's Reports] (in Persian). Tehran: Ney.
- Adamiyat, Fereydun (1972). اندیشه ترقی و حکومت قانون: عصر سپهسالار [The Idea of Progress and the Rule of Law: The Era of Sepahsalar] (in Persian). Tehran: Khwarazmi.
- E'temad os-Saltaneh, Mohammad Hasan Khan (1966). Afshar, Iraj (ed.). روزنامه خاطرات اعتمادالسلطنه [The Diary of E'temad al-Saltaneh] (in Persian). Tehran: Amir Kabir.
- Sa'idi Sirjani, Ali-Akbar, ed. (1983). وقایع اتفاقیه: مجموعه گزارش‌های خفیه‌نویسان انگلیس در ولایات جنوبی ایران [Occurrences and Events: A Collection of Reports by British Secret Agents in the Southern Provinces of Iran from 1291 to 1322 AH] (in Persian) (2nd ed.). Tehran: Novin.
- Afshar, Iraj (1966). سواد و بیاض: مجموعه مقالات ایران‌شناسی [Black and White: Collected Articles on Iranian Studies] (in Persian). Vol. 2 vols. Tehran: Dehkhoda.
- Adamiyat, Fereydun (1970). اندیشه‌های میرزا فتحعلی آخوندزاده [The Thoughts of Mirza Fath-Ali Akhundzadeh] (in Persian). Tehran: Khwarazmi.
- Mafi, Hossein-Qoli Nezam al-Saltaneh (1983). Masumeh Nezam Mafi (ed.). خاطرات و اسناد حسینقلی خان نظام‌السلطنه مافی [Memoirs and Documents of Hosaynqoli Khan Nezam al-Saltaneh Mafi] (in Persian). Vol. 1. Tehran: Nashr-e Tarikh-e Iran.
