= Mostowfian Ashtiani family =

Iranian noble and political family

Mostowfian Ashtiani خاندان مستوفیان آشتیانی
- Persian Political Noble Family
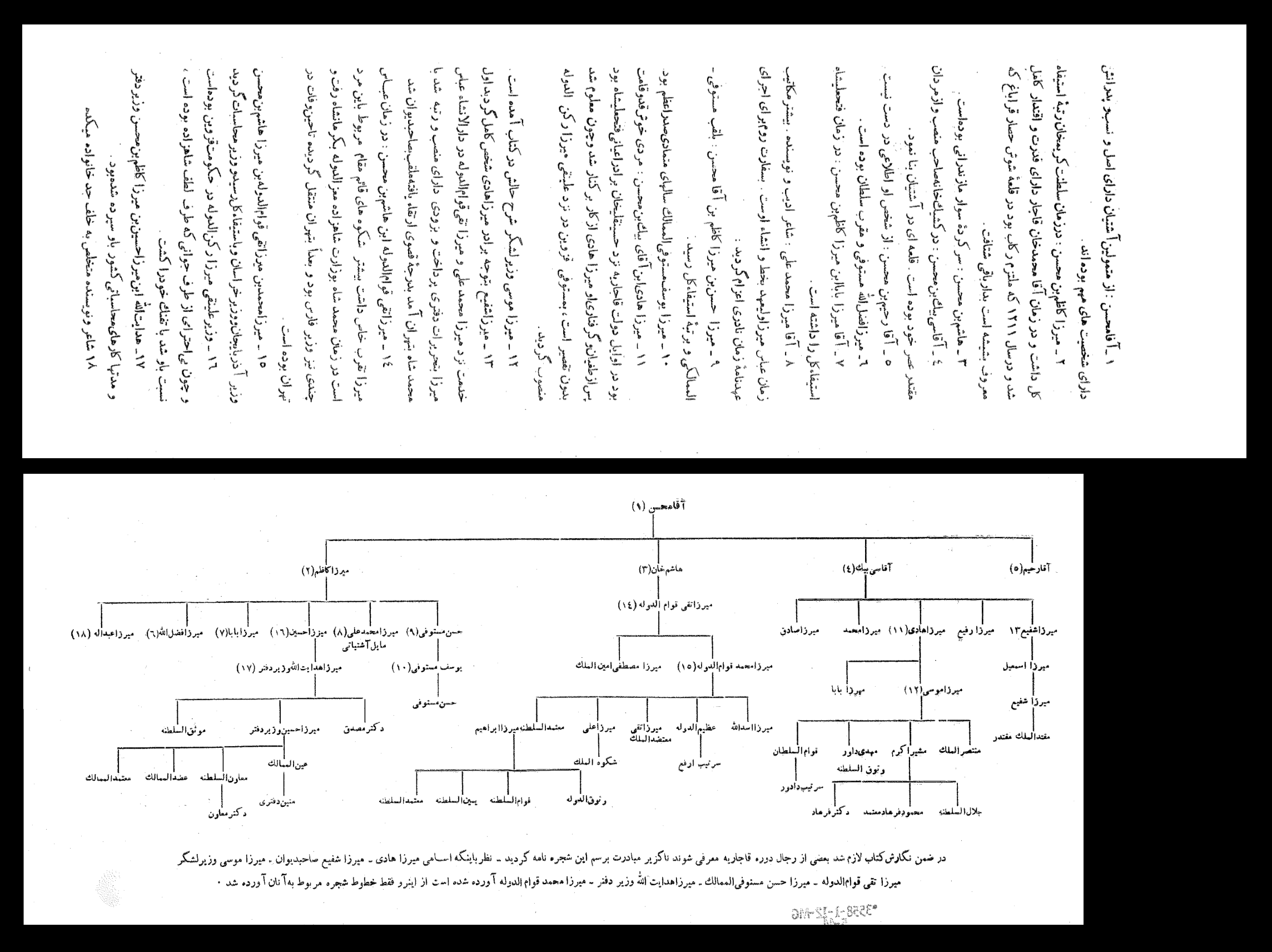
- Family tree of Mostofian Ashtiani family
- Place of origin: Ashtian, Persia
- Founder: Aqa Mohsen Ashtiani
- Final head: Mohammad Mosaddegh
- Titles: Prime Minister of Iran; Grand vizier Mostowfi ol-Mamalek; Mostowf; Mirza; Khan; Agha
- Members: Mirza Yusuf Ashtiani; Mostowfi ol-Mamalek; Vossug ed Dowleh; Ahmad Qavam; Mohammad Mosaddegh; Ahmad Matin-Daftari
- Dissolution: 1967 (death of Mohammad Mosaddegh)
- Cadet branches: Dadvar family Farhad family

Mostowfian Ashtiani family were a Persian family during the Zand era who came to power in the Qajar era and retained power until the middle of the Pahlavi era. Their family occupation was land ownership, but after in Qajar introduced the position of Mostowfi into the Iranian bureaucracy, the family began to work as Mustawfis and took their name from this title. Mostowfian Ashtiani became known as the Hezar Famil (Persian: هزار فامیل, lit. 'The Thousand Families') because of their influence and power in the Qajar bureaucracy.

Aqa Mohsen Ashtiani was the ancestor of Mostowfian Ashtiani and one of Karim Khan Zand's contemporaries, who owned a lot of property in Ashtian district, traditionally belonging to Tafresh County, and ran a kind of local government. His stronghold at Ashtian, parts of which still stand, was 20,000 square meters in size and included a fort, a courtyard, a water tank, stables, a kitchen, a crew section, and an interior and exterior. It is known that Aqa Mohsen sheltered him in this fort when Karim Khan Zand was trying to gain power and was in pursuit with his enemies, and Khan Zand recruited his three children to serve in the court to compensate for this help. From the three sons of Aqa Mohsen Ashtiani, three branches of the Mostofian Ashtiani family were formed. From then on, the members of this dynasty were directly present in the bureaucracy of the Zand dynasty and then the Qajar dynasty, and held positions ranging from secretaries to princes and nobles to Mustawfi to the prime minister.

The six members of this family who became the Prime Minister of Iran and were well-known figures in the field of politics in the contemporary history of Iran are: Mirza Yusuf Ashtiani, Mostowfi ol-Mamalek, Vossug ed Dowleh, Ahmad Qavam, Mohammad Mosaddegh and Ahmad Matin-Daftari. The family names of Mostowfi, Daftari, Matin-daftari, Mossadegh, Maykadeh, Vossugh, Qavam, Shokooh, Dadvar, Farhad, Farhad Motamed, Babashah Ashtiani, and Moghtadar are related to Mostowfian Ashtiani family.

== History ==
=== Early Qajar rule ===
There are not many sources about the life of Aqa Mohsen Ashtiani and how he came to power. What is known is that Aqa Mohsen Ashtiani was one of the great landowners of his time. He had three sons named Mirza Aghasi Bey, Mirza Hashem and Mirza Kazem, from whom three branches of the Mostowfian Ashtiani family were formed. Mostowfian Ashtiani family, although they were supporters of the Zand dynasty, were not angered by Agha Mohammad Khan and even retained their positions. Mirza Kazem, the son of Aqa Mohsen Ashtiani, accompanied Agha Mohammad Khan during the wars in Georgia and was killed during the siege of Shusha fortress. Mirza Mohammad Taqi Qavam al-Dawla Ashtiani, son of Mirza Hashem, participated in the war of 1823–1821 with the Ottoman Empire and received the title of Qavam al-Dawla on behalf of Fath Ali Shah. Throughout the reign of Fath Ali Shah, this family maintained its small role in the bureaucracy and never rose above the position of Mostowfi ol-Mamalek.

=== Naser al-Din Shah era ===
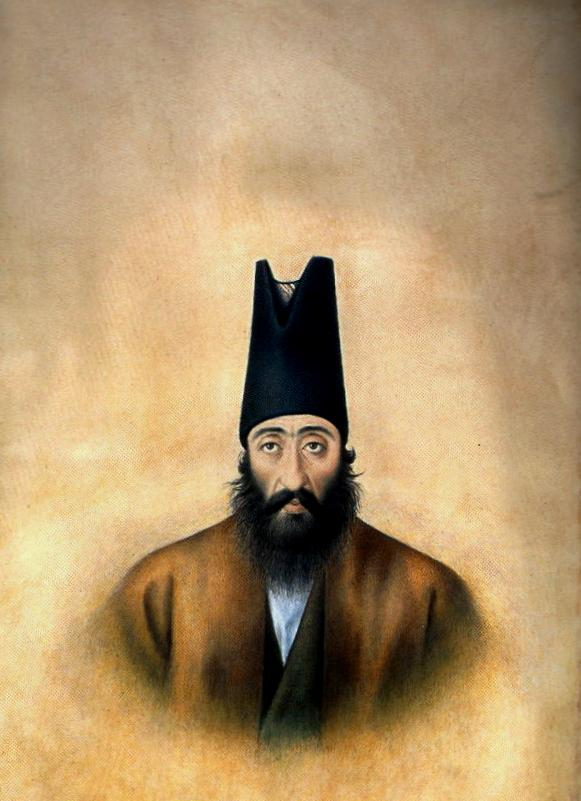
Mirza Yusuf Ashtiani, Prime Minister of Naser al-Din Shah

Mirza Mohammad Qavam al-Dawla, a descendant of Mirza Hashem, married one of the daughters of Mirza Hassan Mostowfi ol-Mamalek Ashtiani, the son of Mirza Kazem, thus strengthening the family relationship. During the reign of Naser al-Din Shah Qajar, Qavam al-Dawlah led an army to capture the Turkmen insurgent bases, but was severely defeated and humiliated on his return to Tehran and imprisoned for some time. In order to discredit Qavam al-Dawla, Mirza Yusuf Ashtiani, who was the brother-in-law of Qavam al-Dawla, presented 100,000 Tomans in a gold tray to Naser al-Din Shah and demanded the release of Qavam al-Dawla. Naser al-Din Shah freed Qavam al-Dawlah and gave him the position of pioneer of Fars province. After that, the influence of the Mostowfian Ashtiani family with the Qajar kings increased. Mirza Yousef Ashtiani held a position equal to the government of Tehran and the director of real estate. He appointed one of his relatives named Mirza Musa Ashtiani as the deputy of Khorasan. Mirza Musa himself was later appointed Minister of Military Affairs and Finance in the cabinet of Mirza Hosein Khan Moshir od-Dowleh.

Mirza Yousef Ashtiani also granted a position to his cousin, Mirza Hideyatu'llah Ashtiani, during his time as prime minister. Although Mirza Hideyatu'llah held the position of secretary since the time of Amir Kabir, he was appointed Minister of Finance during the reign of Mirza Yusuf Ashtiani. Hideyatu'llah was the father of Mohammad Mosaddegh, who was appointed prime minister during the reign of Mohammad Reza Pahlavi.

=== Prime Ministerial era ===
Mostowfi ol-Mamalek, the son of Mirza Yusuf Ashtiani, succeeded his father as Mustawfi as a child. He was elected Prime Minister six times. Ahmad Qavam and Vossug ed Dowleh, both grandchildren of Qavam al-Dawla, both became prime ministers after Persian Constitutional Revolution victory. When Vossug ed Dowleh was prime minister for the second time, he took bribes from Britain and signed the 1919 agreement. During the reign of Reza Shah Pahlavi, when the bureaucracy was overthrown, only three members of Mostowfian Ashtiani family were able to retain power, Ahmad Qavam, who even became prime minister under Mohammad Reza Pahlavi, Mohammad Mosaddegh, and Ahmad Matin-Daftari. Matin-Daftari was Mohammad Mosaddegh's nephew and son-in-law.

=== Dadvar Branch ===
Mirza Musa Ashtiani married three times, his first wife was Amirzadeh Khanum, daughter of Mahmud Mirza Qajar, son of Fath Ali Shah, from she, Mirza Musa Ashtiani had three children named Montaser al-Molk, Qavam al-Sultan and Vosough al-Saltanah. The three changed their surnames from Ashtiani to Dadvar because they were upset with their own Ashtiani relatives. Vosough al-Saltanah Dadvar became Minister of War in the cabinet of Mirza Hassan Khan Mushir al-Dawla. He was also the governor of Gilan, Khorasan and Kerman for some time. He was a member of the National Assembly representing Tehran in 1930 and He became governor of Fars and then Azerbaijan in 1947, but was fired because he entered into negotiations with the Soviets to cede northern oil concessions. Qavam al-Sultan was the father of Abdullah Dadvar, a musician who strongly supported Alinaghi Vaziri, who was developing a method for notation and arrangement in Iranian traditional music. Montaser al-Molk wrote several books on the history of Mostowfian Ashtiani family, and he had a grandson named Abolhassan Dadvar, who was the mayor of Rasht and the governor of Tehran.

=== Babashah Branch ===
Mirza Musa (Vazir Lashgar) Ashtiani's younger brother Mirza Baba, known as Khan Baba, was the patriarch of another branch of the family. He had an older son, Mirza Ali Khan, who had the inherited Mostofi title and resided in Tehran. His younger son Reza, remained in Ashtian and married Sadighe Beigum, the daughter of Mirza Ismail Khan Nouraei Mostowfi, the Governer of Ashtian and custodian of its Fortress. Reza died fairly young but the couple had a son, Bagher Babashah Ashtiani who became a prominent jurist, prosecutor, and special counsel during the Pahlavi era. Sadighe's brother, Mirza Abdullah Khan Nouraei became Ashtian's mayor in 1940s.

=== Farhad Branch ===
From Mirza Musa Ashtiani's other wife, Esmat al-Saltanah, a son named Musa Mushir-Akaram was born, who returned to Ashtian and built several houses and mansions there with the inheritance left by his father. He had a son named Ahmad Farhad who was a physician, writer and president of the University of Tehran. He was one of the first to bring a radiology device to Iran to help diagnose diseases.

== Legacy ==
Mostowfian Ashtiani family were art lovers and artists. In Ashtian, they built large and magnificent buildings, including mansions and castles. The buildings built by this family greatly influenced Qajar architecture. Apart from architecture, they were also very advanced in the field of painting and music, some members of this family such as Abdullah Dadvar and Mirza Yusuf Ashtiani were musicians. There are paintings in their mansions that are drawn in the style of the Qajar school of painting and are very original and old examples. They were supporters of great artists such as Kamal-ol-molk and Sani ol molk. Sani ol molk painted a picture of Mirza Yusuf Ashtiani to compensate for his help. Among all the families of the Qajar bureaucrat, Mostowfian Ashtiani had the highest number of educated people. They supported the modern teaching method developed by the Dar al-Fonun University and the schools of Haji-Mirza Hassan Roshdieh.

Of course, the main influence that Mostowfian Ashtiani family had on Iranian society was the term "thousand families", which was previously a nickname for the Khajeh Nouri family. This family had so much influence in the Qajar court and bureaucracy that after the Shah, power was in the hands of the members of Mostowfian Ashtiani. It is a narration of Naser al-Din Shah's jealousy of Mirza Yusuf Ashtiani's great wealth. During the period when three prime ministers of this dynasty were also appointed as prime ministers during the reign of Ahmad Shah (Vossug ed Dowleh, Mostowfi ol-Mamalek and Qavam os-Saltaneh), the 1919 agreement was signed, bribery reached its peak and many cities and villages of Iran was deprived of safe water and food. Therefore, this family was considered corrupt because they could not solve Iran's problems, and some of them even cooperated with British empire.

Mostowfian Ashtiani family played a major role in changing the Qajar bureaucracy, which was an imitation of the Safavid bureaucracy. Mirza Yusuf Ashtiani made many reforms in the administrative system and bureaucracy, which greatly helped the princes and statesmen. He was the founder of a system in which the Prime Minister was powerful and the Speaker of the Council of Ministers. The responsibility for all government departments rested with the Prime Minister. This means that the Shah was in direct contact with the Chancellor, and the Chancellor referred everything to the relevant administration, and the other ministers were each in charge of their own ministries, especially in the presence of the Chancellor. Virtually no minister had the right to interfere in the affairs of another ministry, but in the passion of all government affairs, the ministers were partners in each other's actions and in charge of government affairs. Mirza Yusuf Ashtiani was involved in oligarchizing the political-administrative system during the reign of Nasser al-Din Shah until the end of the Qajar period.

== Genealogy ==
=== Mirza Hashem branch ===
Genealogy of Mostowfian Ashtiani family, Mirza Hashem branch

Aqa Mohsen Ashtiani
Mirza Kazem Ashtiani | Mirza Hashem | Mirza Aghasi Bey
Mayel Ashtiani | Mirza Mohammad Taqi | Farhad Mirza Motamed Doleh son of Abbas Mirza
daughter | Mirza Mohammad Qavam al-Dawla | Esmat al-Saltanah
Tavus Khanum daughter of Majd ol-Molk Sinaki | Ibrahim Motamed Al-Saltanah | Motazdalmalk | Azim Al-Dawlah
Ahmad Qavam | Vossug ed Dowleh

=== Mirza Kazem Ashtiani Branch ===
Genealogy of Mostowfian Ashtiani family, Mirza Kazem Ashtiani Branch

Aqa Mohsen Ashtiani
Mirza Kazem Ashtiani | Mirza Hashem | Mirza Aghasi Bey
Mirza Hassan Mostowfi ol-Mamalek Ashtiani | Mayel Ashtiani | Mirza Hossein | Firouz Mirza son of Abbas Mirza
Mirza Yusuf; Ashtiani | daughter | Mirza Hideyatu'llah; Ashtiani | Najm al-Saltanah | Abdol-Hossein; Farman Farma
Mostowfi ol-Mamalek | Mirza Mohammad Hussein; Vizir Daftar | Mirza Ali Mowaffaq al-Saltanah | Mohammad Mosaddegh | Amina Daftar Al-Muluk | Firouz Nosrat-ed-Dowleh
Mahmoud Daftari | Mozaffar Firouz | Maryam Farman Farmaian
Ahmad Matin-Daftari | Abdol-Aziz Mirza Farmanfarmaian
Manucher Mirza Farman Farmaian
Sattareh Farmanfarmaian
Mohammad Hossein Mirza Firouz
Eskandar Firouz

=== Mirza Aghasi Bey Branch ===
Genealogy of Mostowfian Ashtiani family, Mirza Aghasi Bey Branch

Aqa Mohsen Ashtiani
Mirza Kazem Ashtiani | Mirza Hashem | Mirza Aghasi Bey
Farhad Mirza Son of Abbas Mirza | Mirza Hadi | Mahmud Mirza Son of Fath-Ali Shah Qajar
Mirza Mohammad Qavam al-Dawla | Esmat al-Saltanah | Mirza Musa Ashtiani | Amirzadeh Khanum
Motazed al-Molk | Azim al-Dawlah | Musa Mushir-Akaram | Vosough al-Saltanah | Qavam al-Sultan | Montaser al-Molk
Ahmad Farhad | Mahmoud Farhad Motamed | Abdullah Dadvar | Badiozzaman Dadvar | Mohammad Ali Dadvar
Abulhassan Dadvar

== Titles ==
=== List of heads of the Mostowfian Ashtiani ===
==== Prime Minister and Grand Vizier ====
| Portrait | Name | From | Until | Relationship with predecessor |
|---|---|---|---|---|
| | Mirza Yusuf Ashtiani (Mostowfi ol-Mamalek) | June 24, 1884 | 15 April 1886 | grandson of Mirza Kazem Ashtiani who was Mostowfi in early Qajar period. |
| | Mostowfi ol-Mamalek (six times) | 25 July 1910 | 2 June 1927 | Eldest son of Mirza Yusuf Ashtiani. |
| | Hassan Vossug (Vossug ed Dowleh) | 29 August 1916 (first time) | 3 July 1920 (last time) | kinsman of Mostowfi ol-Mamalek. |
| | Ahmad Qavam (Qavam os-Saltaneh) | 4 June 1921 (first time) | 22 July 1952 (last time) | Brother of Vossug ed Dowleh. |
| | Ahmad Matin-Daftari (Mo'in al-Dowleh) | 26 October 1939 | 26 June 1940 | kinsman of Ahmad Qavam. |
| | Mohammad Mosaddegh (Mosaddegh-os-Saltaneh) | 28 April 1951 (first time) | 19 August 1953 (last time) | nephew and father in law of Ahmad Matin-Daftari. |

==== Minister of Military Affairs and Finance ====
| Portrait | Name | From | Until | Relationship with predecessor |
|---|---|---|---|---|
| | Mirza Hideyatu'llah Ashtiani (Vazir Daftar) | 1859 | 1872 | Cousin of Mirza Yusuf Ashtiani, son of Mirza Hassan, grandson of Mirza Kazem Ashtiani. |
| | Mirza Musa Ashtiani (Vazir Lashkar) | 1872 | 1880 | A distant lineage with Mirza Hideyatu'llah Ashtiani. |
