= Mehrmah Khanum Ismat al-Saltaneh =

Qajar princess and Travel writer

Ismat al-Saltaneh Mehrmah Khanum
- مهرماه خانم عصمت‌السلطنه
- Born: Qajar Iran
- Died: 1917
- Citizenship: Iranian
- Occupation: Travel writer
- Spouse(s): Four, including Mirza Mohammad Qavam al-Dawla, Mirza Mousa Vazir Lashkar Ashtiani, Abd al-Wahhab Khan Asaf al-Dowleh, Hossein Khan Hessam al-Molk
- Children: Three
- Parents: Farhad Mirza (father); Jahan-Ara Khanum (mother)

Mehrmah Khanum Ismat al-Saltaneh (Persian: مهرماه خانم عصمت‌السلطنه; d. 1917) was a Qajar princess and travel writer, the daughter of Farhad Mirza Mo'tamed al-Dowleh and Jahan-Ara Khanum, who was the daughter of Mohammad Ali Mirza Dowlatshah. She was also the full sister of Emamqoli Mirza Emad al-Dowleh.

== Biography ==
During the final years of Mohammad Shah's reign, he held Farhad Mirza in high esteem. In an effort to secure a supporter within the royal family for his favored son, Abbas Mirza Molk-Ara, who was known as a rival to Naser al-Din Mirza for the throne—Mohammad Shah arranged the engagement of Mehrmah Khanum to Molk-Ara. However, with Mohammad Shah's death and the ascension of Naser al-Din Shah to the throne, Molk-Ara was exiled to the holy cities of Iraq, and the marriage never took place.

=== Marriages and Family Life ===
In her youth, Mehrmah Khanum married Mirza Mohammad Qavam al-Dawla, who was several years older than her. This marriage resulted in two children. After Qavam al-Dowleh's death in 1873, Mehrmah Khanum married his cousin, Mirza Musa Vazir-Lashkar Ashtiani. Their marriage produced a son named Musa Moshir Akram.

Shortly thereafter, Mehrmah Khanum married Abd al-Wahhab Khan Asaf al-Dowleh but had no children with him. Following his death in 1888, she married Hossein Khan Hessam al-Molk, the governor of Hamedan. However, Hessam al-Molk also died soon after, leaving Mehrmah Khanum widowed once again.

=== Children ===
Mehrmah Khanum had three children:

- Mohammad Taqi Khan Mo'tazed al-Molk (son of Qavam al-Dawla), who served as a special aide to Naser al-Din Shah and married the daughter of Abd al-Wahhab Khan Nezam al-Molk.
- Mostafa Khan Azim al-Dowleh (son of Qavam al-Dowleh).
- Musa Moshir Akram (son of Vazir-Lashkar).

=== Later life and death ===
Mehrmah Khanum was granted the title Ismat al-Saltaneh in the month of Muharram 1885. She died in Ramadan 1917.

== Travel and Literary Contributions ==
In 1879–1880, she embarked on a pilgrimage to Mecca, which lasted ten months, and her travelogue, Safarnameh-ye Ismat al-Saltaneh, is a creation of this journey. The travelogue was completed by a scribe in 1881, during which she was referred to as "the wife of the esteemed and noble Nasir al-Dowleh." This suggests that she married Abd al-Wahhab Khan Nasir al-Dowleh a few months after the passing of Mirza Musa.
