= Meydan-e Horr Metro Station =

Station of the Tehran Metro

Meydan-e Horr Metro Station ایستگاه مترو میدان حر
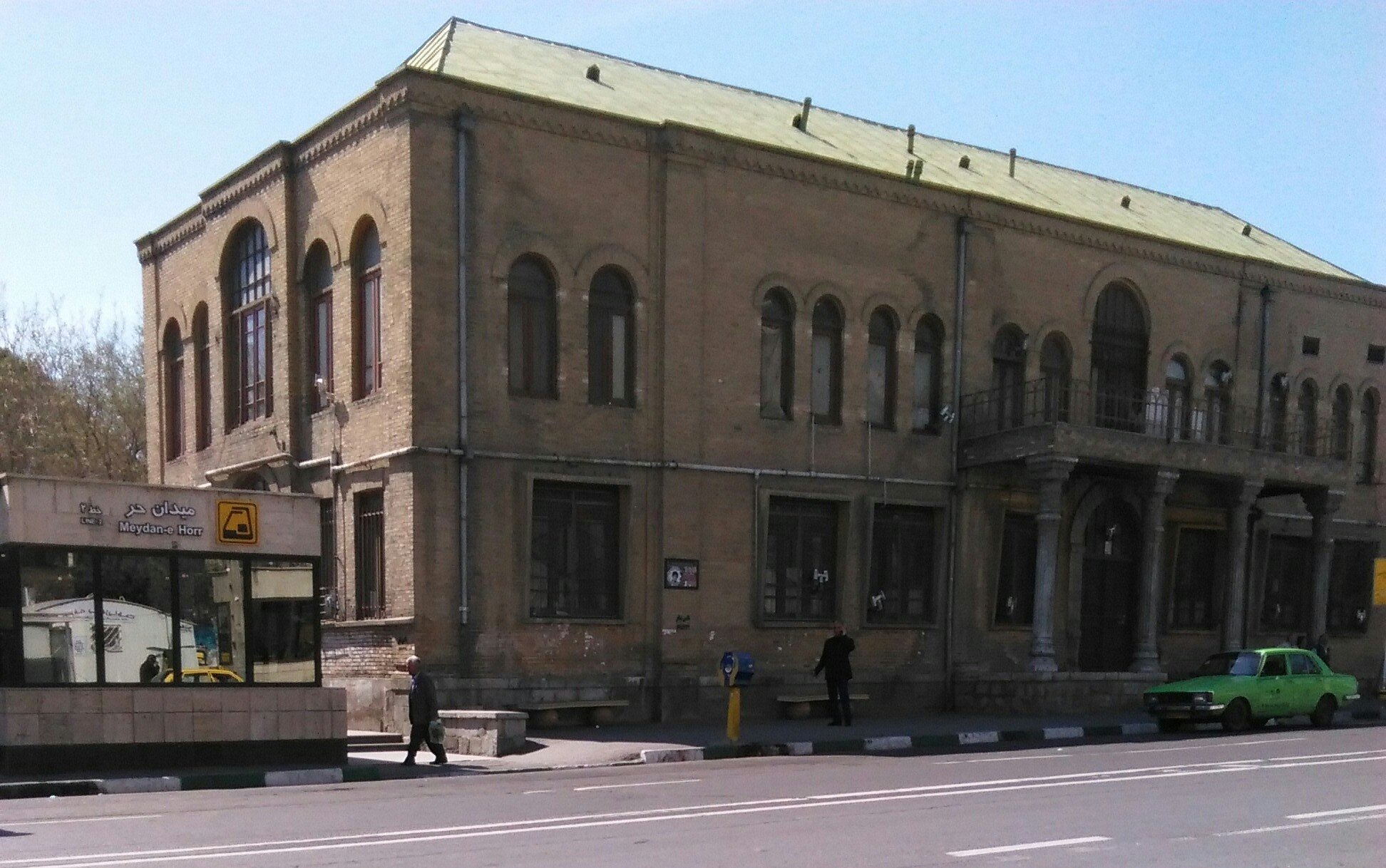
- Entrance to Meydan-e Horr Metro Station

General information
- Location: Imam Khomeini Street; District 11, Tehran, Tehran County; Tehran Province, Iran
- Coordinates: 35°41′27″N 51°23′19″E
- System: Tehran Metro Station
- Operator: Tehran Urban and Suburban Railways Organization (Metro)
- Platforms: 2 Side platforms
- Tracks: 2
- Connections: Tehran Buses: 404 Horr - Shahid Fathi

Construction
- Structure type: Underground
- Depth: 91 ft (28 m)

History
- Opened: 21 February 2000

Services
Preceding station	Tehran Metro	Following station
Shahid Navvab-e Safavi towards Tehran (Sadeghiyeh)	Line 2	Daneshgah-e Emam Ali towards Farhangsara
Location

Meydan-e Horr Metro Station is a station in Tehran Metro Line 2. It is located in Hor Square at the junction of Imam Khomeini Street and Kargar Street. It is between Imam Ali University Metro Station and Navvab Metro Station.
