= Hasan Abad Metro Station =

Station of the Tehran Metro

Hasan Abad Metro Station ایستگاه مترو حسن آباد
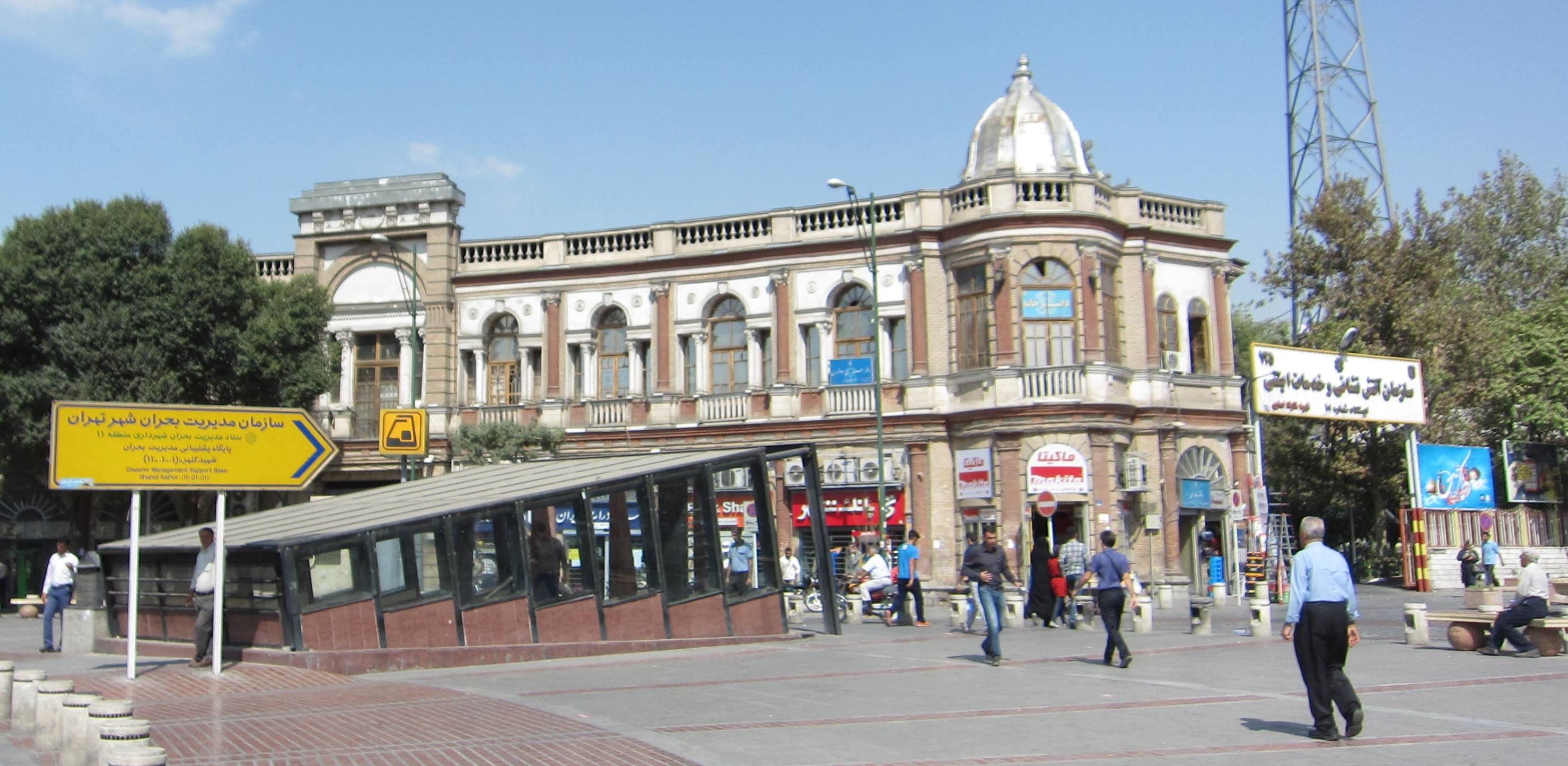
- The entrance of Hasan Abad Metro Station

General information
- Location: Imam Khomeini Street- Hafez Street; Districts 11-12, Tehran, Tehran County; Tehran Province, Iran
- Coordinates: 35°41′11″N 51°24′35″E
- System: Tehran Metro Station
- Operator: Tehran Urban and Suburban Railways Organization (Metro)
- Connections: Tehran Buses: 270 Fayyazbakhsh Term.-Qasrodasht St.

History
- Opened: 21 February 2000

Services
Preceding station	Tehran Metro	Following station
Daneshgah-e Emam Ali towards Tehran (Sadeghiyeh)	Line 2	Imam Khomeini towards Farhangsara
Location

Hasan Abad Metro Station is a station in Tehran Metro Line 2. It is located in the junction of Imam Khomeini Street and Hafez Street in Hasanabad Square. It is located between Imam Khomeini and Imam Ali University Metro Station.
