= Daneshgah-e Emam Ali Metro Station =

Station of the Tehran Metro

Daneshgah-e Emam Ali Metro Station ایستگاه مترو دانشگاه امام علی
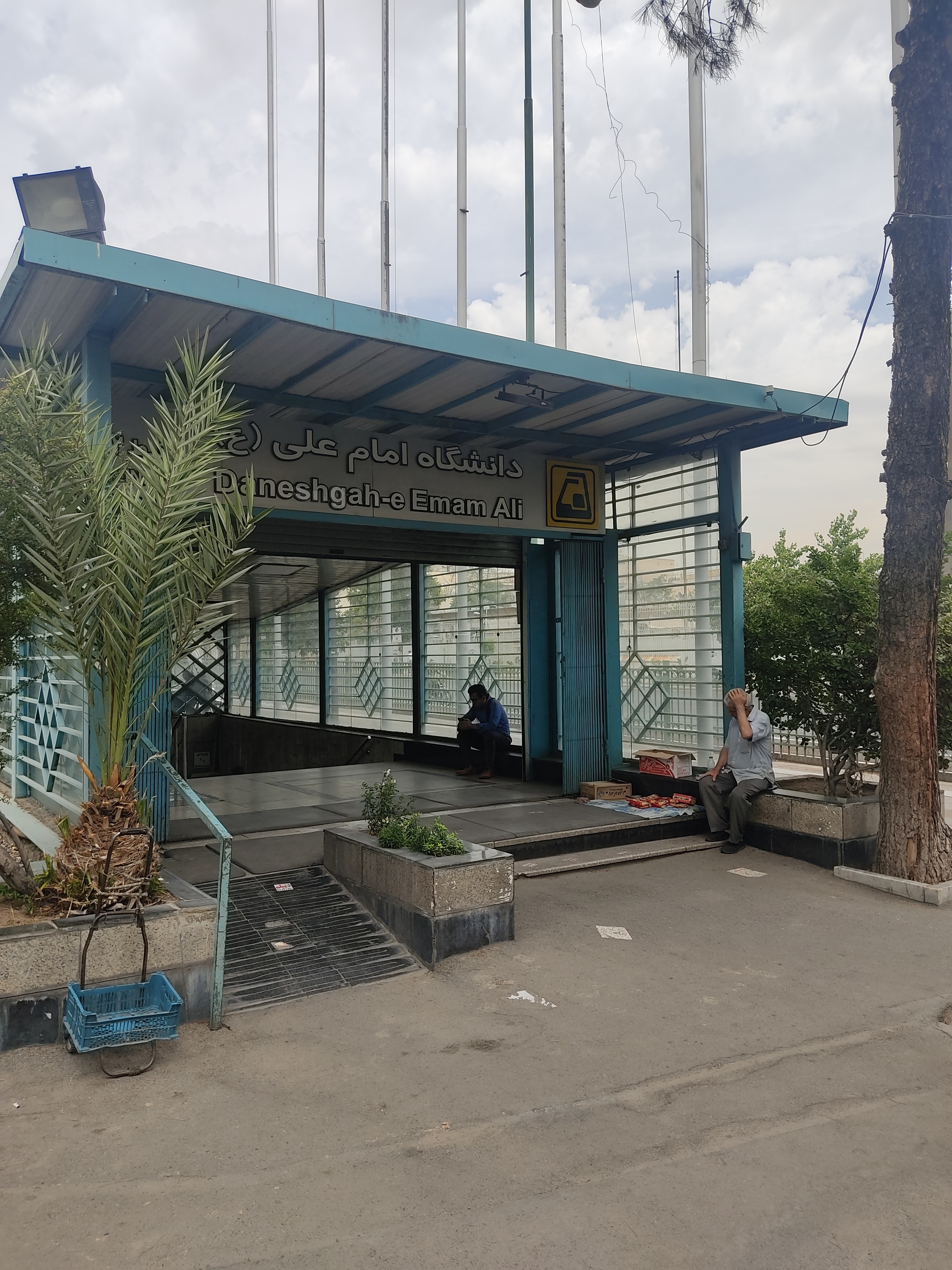

General information
- Location: Imam Khomeini Street; Imam Ali University; District 11, Tehran, Tehran County; Tehran Province, Iran
- Coordinates: 35°41′14″N 51°23′57″E
- System: Tehran Metro Station
- Operator: Tehran Urban and Suburban Railways Organization (Metro)
- Platforms: 2 Side Platforms Tehran Metro Line 2
- Tracks: 4

Construction
- Structure type: Underground
- Platform levels: 2

History
- Opened: 21 February 2000

Services
Preceding station	Tehran Metro	Following station
Meydan-e Horr towards Tehran (Sadeghiyeh)	Line 2	Hasan Abad towards Farhangsara
Location

Daneshgah-e Emam Ali Metro Station, which is translated into Imam Ali University Metro Station is a station in Tehran Metro Line 2. It is located in Imam Khomeini Street in front of the old Majles building near Imam Ali University. It is between Imam Khomeini Metro Station and Hor Square Metro Station. The station is named after Imam Ali University for Army Officers, which is located near the station on Imam Khomeini Street. The Assembly of Experts' building is also located next to this station.
