= Oways Mirza Ehtesham od-Dowleh =

Qajar prince (1839–1892)

Oways Mirza
- Soltan; Ehtesham od-Dowleh
- Born: 1839
- Died: 1892 (aged 52–53)
Names
- Soltan Oways Mirza Ehtesham od-Dowleh
- Dynasty: Qajar
- Father: Farhad Mirza
- Mother: daughter of Mohammad-Ali Mirza Dowlatshah
- Religion: Twelver Shia Islam

Oways Mirza Ehtesham od-Dowleh (Persian: اویس میرزا احتشام الدوله), commonly known as Soltan Oways Mirza (Persian: سلطان اویس میرزا; 1839 – 1892) was a Qajar prince, elder son of Farhad Mirza and maternal grandson of Mohammad-Ali Mirza Dowlatshah.

Oways Mirza served as personal attendant to shah with the title Ehtesham ol-Molk. In 1865, he was governor of Kohgiluyeh and Behbahan. Upon his removal from this post in 1869 he joined his father, who was governor of Kurdistan and who sent him to govern Hamadan as his deputy. Oways Mirza was among entourage of Naser al-Din Shah during shah's first European journey in 1873. He was appointed governor of Fars in 1887 and remained post for four years. After his father's death in 1877, he received title Mo'tamed ed-Dowleh, and Ehtesham od-Dowleh was bestowed upon his younger brother Abdol-Ali Mirza. As governor of Fars, he contributed to development of province. He has been described as a knowledgeable and pleasant person to associate with.

== Sources ==
- Afshar, Iraj (1998). "Ehtešām-al-Dawla". In Yarshater, Ehsan (ed.). Encyclopædia Iranica (Online ed.). Encyclopædia Iranica Foundation.
- Khormuji, Mohammad-Ja'far (1985). حقایق اخبار ناصری [Truths of Naseri News] (in Persian). Tehran: Ney Publishing.
- Bamdad, Mehdi (1972). شرح حال رجال ایران در قرن ۱۲ و ۱۳ و ۱۴ هجری [Biographies of Iranian Notables in the 12th, 13th and 14th Centuries AH] (in Persian). Vol. 2. Zavvar.
