= Mirza Mohammad Qavam al-Dawla =

Iranian politician (died 1873)

Mirza Mohammad Ashtiani
- محمد آشتیانی
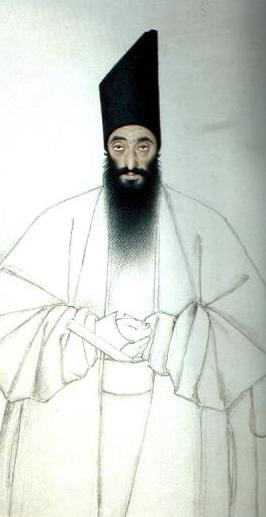
- Qavam al-Dawla by Sani ol Molk

Personal details
- Died: 1873
- Noble family: Mostowfian Ashtiani

Mirza Mohammad Ashtiani (died 1873), also known as Qavam al-Dawla, was the governor of Khorasan and Fars and a member of the Mostowfian Ashtiani family. Qavam al-Dawla is best known for his defeat in the Merv war against Teke Turkmen tribe.

== Career ==
He entered the government service during the reign of Fath-Ali Shah Qajar and during the reign of Naser al-Din Shah Qajar, he achieved high ranks and was appointed governor of Khorasan.

In 1862, Naser al-Din Shah ordered his uncle Hamzeh Mirza Heshmat od-Dowleh, along with Qavam al-Dawla, to seize the bases of the Turkmen insurgents, who from time to time attacked Khorasan, looting the people and creating insecurity. But Qavam al-Dawla and his forces were severely defeated and returned to Tehran. Naser al-Din Shah removed him and Hamzeh Mirza from their posts, imprisoned Qavam al-Dawla as the main culprit, and even tried to kill him. But Mirza Yusuf Ashtiani, brother-in-law of Qavam al-Dawla, presented 100,000 Tomans in a golden tray to Naser al-Din Shah and demanded the release of Qavam al-Dawla. Naser al-Din Shah released Qavam al-Dawlah and appointed him governor of Fars.

== Family ==
Qavam al-Dawlah married twice, his first wife being the daughter of Mirza Mayel Ashtiani, the son of Kazem Ashtiani, from whom he had a son named Ibrahim Motamed al-Saltanah, who was the father of Ahmad Qavam and Vossug ed Dowleh. His second marriage was to Mehrmah Khanum Ismat al-Saltaneh, daughter of Farhad Mirza, son of Abbas Mirza, from whom he had two children.

== Genealogy ==
Genealogy of Mostowfian Ashtiani family, Mirza Hashem branch

Aqa Mohsen Ashtiani
Mirza Kazem Ashtiani	Mirza Hashem	Mirza Aghasi Bey
Mayel Ashtiani	Mirza Mohammad Taqi	Farhad Mirza Motamed Doleh son of Abbas Mirza
daughter	Mirza Mohammad Qavam al-Dawla	Esmat al-Saltanah
Tavus Khanum daughter of Majd ol-Molk Sinaki	Ibrahim Motamed Al-Saltanah	Motazdalmalk	Azim Al-Dawlah
Ahmad Qavam	Vossug ed Dowleh
