= Vosugh od-Dowleh =

Prime Minister of Iran (1868–1951)

- وثوق‌الدوله
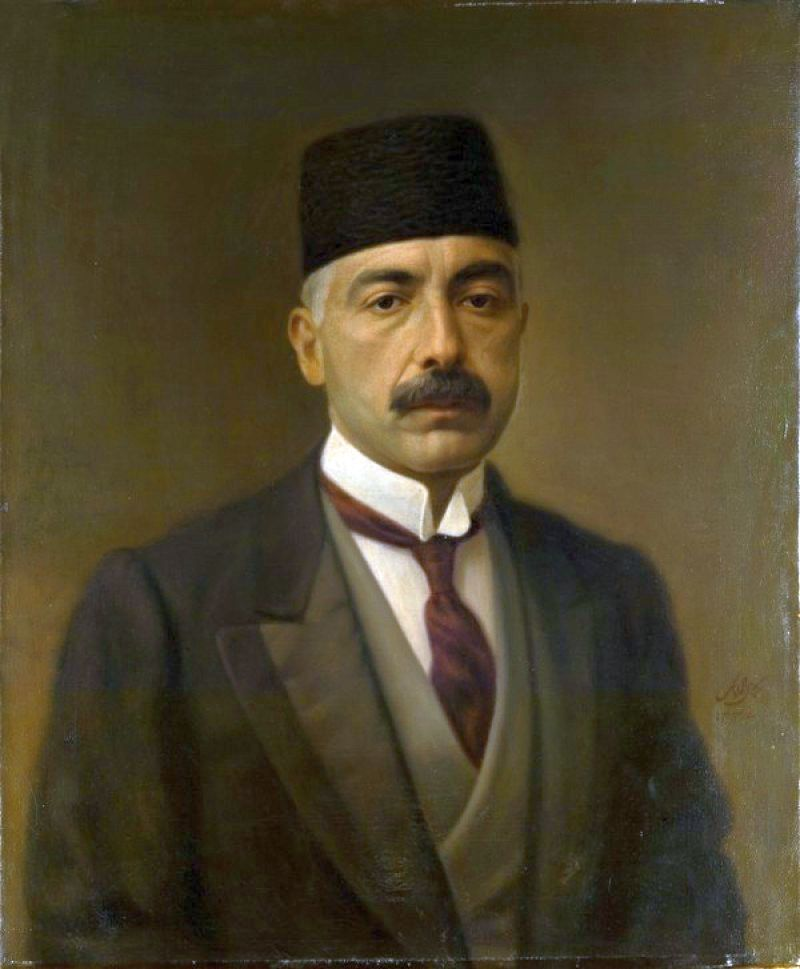
- Vosough od-Dowleh by Kamal-ol-molk, painted between 1900 and 1917

12th Prime Minister of Iran
- In office 29 August 1916 – 5 June 1917
- Monarch: Ahmad Shah Qajar
- Preceded by: Sepahsalar-e Tonekaboni
- Succeeded by: Mohammad-Ali Ala al-Saltaneh
- In office 8 August 1918 – 3 July 1920
- Monarch: Ahmad Shah Qajar
- Preceded by: Najaf-Qoli Samsam al-Saltaneh
- Succeeded by: Hassan Pirnia

Personal details
- Born: 1 April 1868 Tehran, Sublime State of Iran
- Died: 3 February 1951 (aged 82) Tehran, Imperial State of Iran
- Party: Democrat Party
- Spouse: Maryam Badr
- Children: 10

Hassan Vosugh od-Dowleh (Persian: حسن وثوق‌الدوله; 1 April 1868 – 3 February 1951) was an Iranian politician who served as the Prime Minister of Iran twice. He was the older brother of Ahmad Qavam, who also served as Prime Minister, five times.

== Life ==
Hassan Vosugh was born to one of Iran's most famous families. His father was Mirza Ebrahim Motamed os-Saltaneh, and his grandfather was Mirza Mohammad Qavam al-Dawla.

Vosugh's mother died when he was young, after which he was cared for by an uncle while his father worked as a financial manager in several of Iran's provinces. He was educated at home by tutors and was fluent in French and English. As an adolescent, he accompanied his father on his travels, and took over the financial administration of Azerbaijan at a young age.

Vosugh was elected as a founding member and deputy president of the inaugural National Consultative Assembly (Majles) of Iran in 1906. In the years 1911 to 1915, Vosugh was the first Foreign Minister and later Minister of Finance. He served as Prime Minister from August 1916 to June 1917 and again from August 1918 to July 1920.

Vosugh played a leading role in negotiations that resulted in the 1919 Anglo-Persian Agreement, which led to allegations that he had been bribed by the British. Although Vosugh denied that he had enriched himself personally and also offered to repay the money, his reputation was so damaged that he left Iran.

Vosugh returned to the country in June 1926, not long after the accession of Reza Shah. He served briefly again as Minister of Finance and then as Minister of Justice. He resigned as minister to run for a seat in the Majles, to which he was elected. After the expiry of his term in 1928, Vosugh withdrew from politics, though he was still frequently consulted by Reza Shah in financial matters. In 1936, he became a member of the newly founded Academy of Persian Language and Literature.

In 1951, Hassan Vosugh died in Tehran.

== Issue ==
Vosugh married Maryam Badr, daughter of the prominent Qajar statesman and minister Nasir al-Dowleh.

The issue from this marriage was;

Asfar ol-Molk, married Amir Aalam and had issue. Her daughter Homa married Gholamreza Pahlavi.

== See also ==
- Qajar dynasty
- List of prime ministers of Iran

== Sources ==
- 'Alí Rizā Awsatí (عليرضا اوسطى), Iran in the Past Three Centuries (Irān dar Se Qarn-e Goz̲ashteh - ايران در سه قرن گذشته), Volumes 1 and 2 (Paktāb Publishing - انتشارات پاکتاب, Tehran, Iran, 2003). ISBN 964-93406-6-1 (Vol. 1), ISBN 964-93406-5-3 (Vol. 2).

Political offices
Preceded by Mohammad Vali Khan Tonekaboni	Prime Minister of Iran; 1916–1917	Succeeded by Mohammad-Ali Ala al-Saltaneh
Preceded by Najaf-Qoli Samsam al-Saltaneh	Prime Minister of Iran; 1918–1920	Succeeded by Hassan Pirnia
