= Hasanabad Square (Tehran) =

Historic square in Tehran, Iran

- میدان حسن‌آباد (Persian)
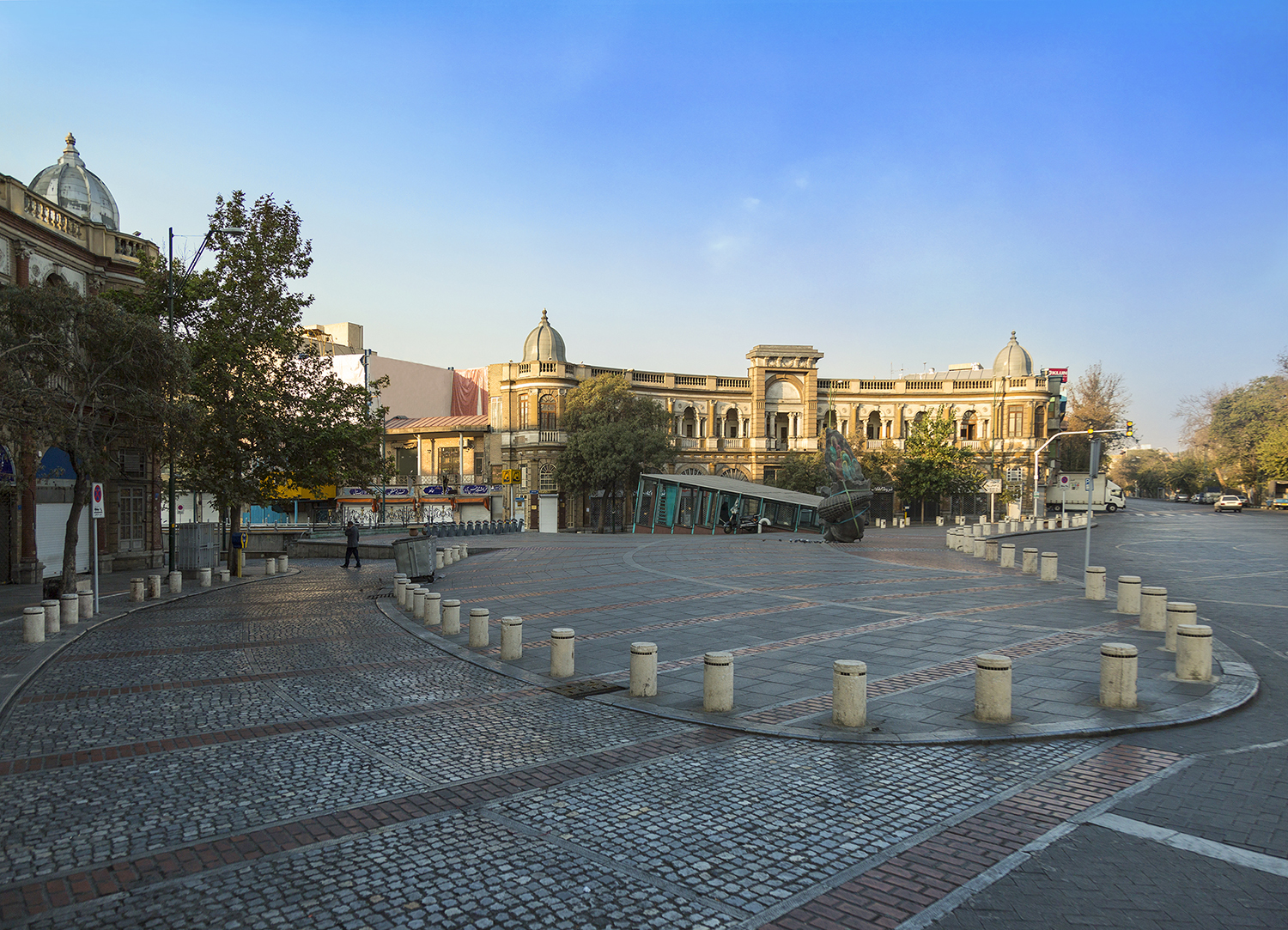
- Hasanabad Square
- Interactive map of Hasanabad Square
- 35.6862°N 51.4180°E
- Location: Tehran, Iran

History
- Built: 1780

Site notes
- Architect: Ghelij Baghlian
- Governing body: Municipality of Tehran

Hasan-Abad Square (Persian: میدان حسن‌آباد, romanized: Meydân-e Hasan Âbâd), also spelled Hasanabad, is a historic area and city square in Tehran, Iran.

== History ==
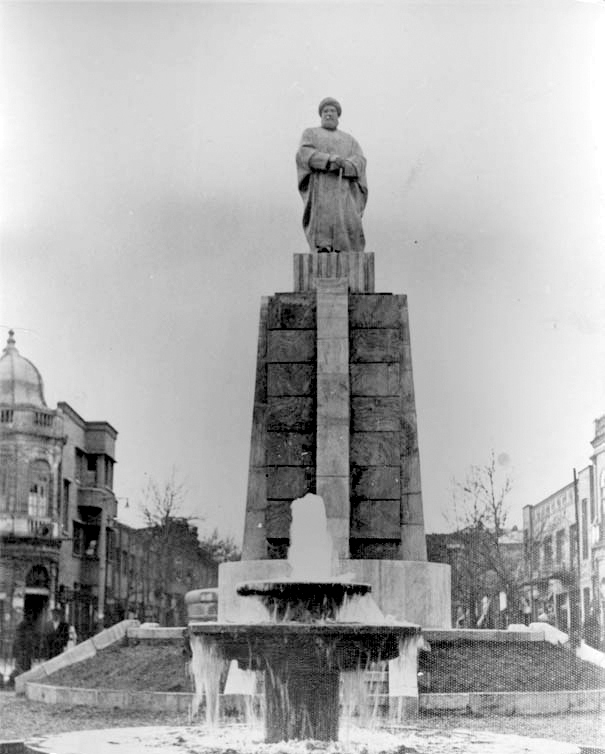
The now lost statue of the Qajar-era constitutional activist Malek-ol-Motekallemin, Hasanabad Square, 1957

The area was once behind the fortifications of Safavid Tehran. It was close to northeastern end of the city limits so burials were performed there, though in small extent.

In 1867, Naser al-Din Shah Qajar ordered the expansion of the capital and thus, that area were enclosed in the new city limits. For much of late 19th-century, the area was just a city junction of moderate importance; a state hospital was built in the east end and the old graveyard was kept being used by the wealthy residents of Tehran. At the western end of the cemetery, Mirza Yusuf Ashtiani, a vizier of the Qajar shah, lived with his family in a mansion which after his death, was used by his eldest son, Mirza Hasan Ashtiani, a Prime Minister of Iran, thus giving it the Hasan Abad name.

In 1929, the current symmetrical buildings were built and the four-way junction became a roundabout. Some years later, a large statue of Malek ol-Motekallemin (an Islamic activist during Persian Constitutional Revolution) was erected in the middle.

Following the Iraqi Invasion of Iran in 1980, the square was briefly renamed to 31st of Shahrivar, in commemoration of the invasion day. However, the new name did not stick and was reverted back to Hasan Abad. At the same time and for construction of the current underpass and metro station, the statue was moved to the warehouse of Park-e Shahr, before completely disappearing.

== Structure ==
Detail of the buildings at Hasanabad Square
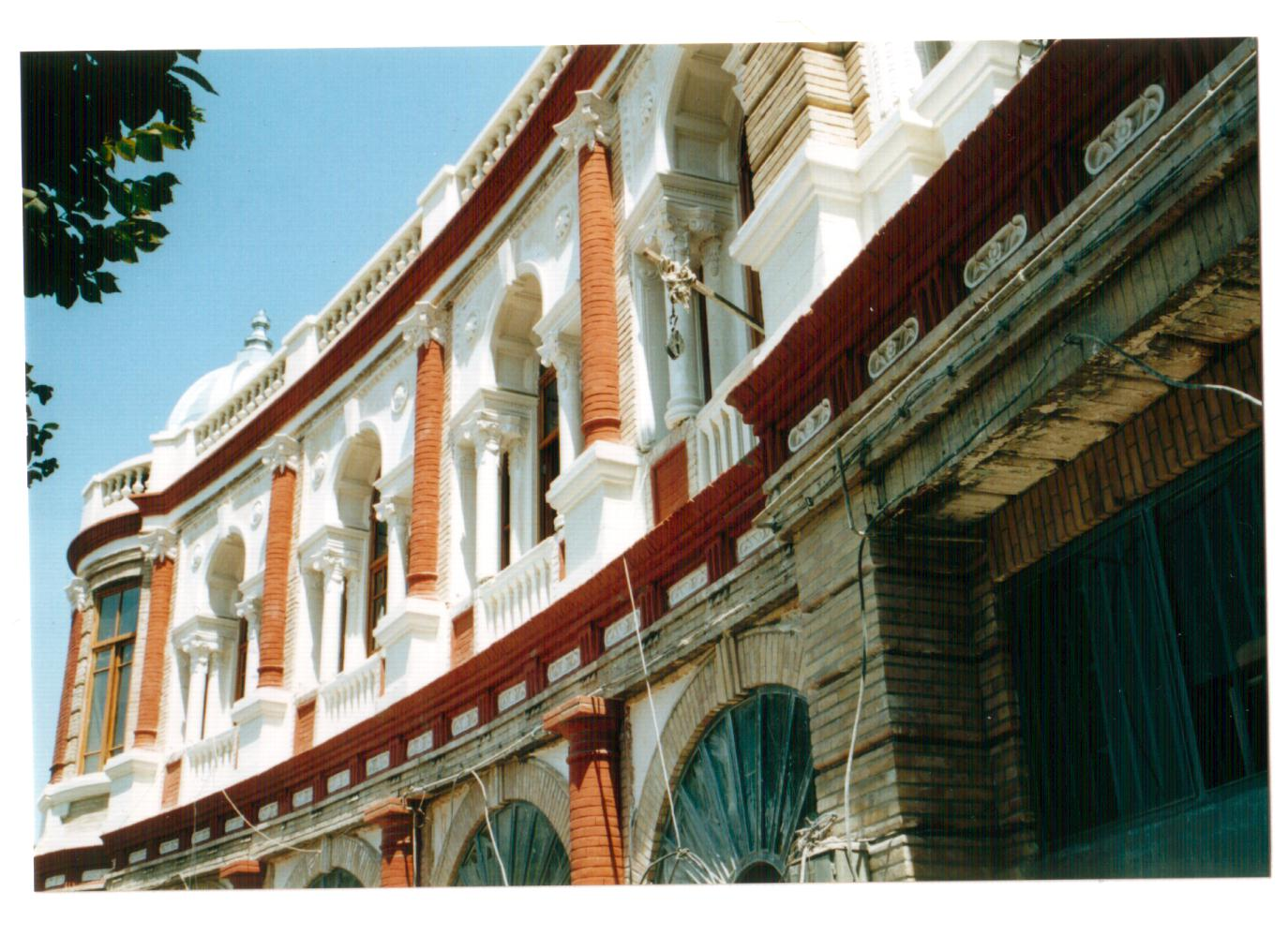
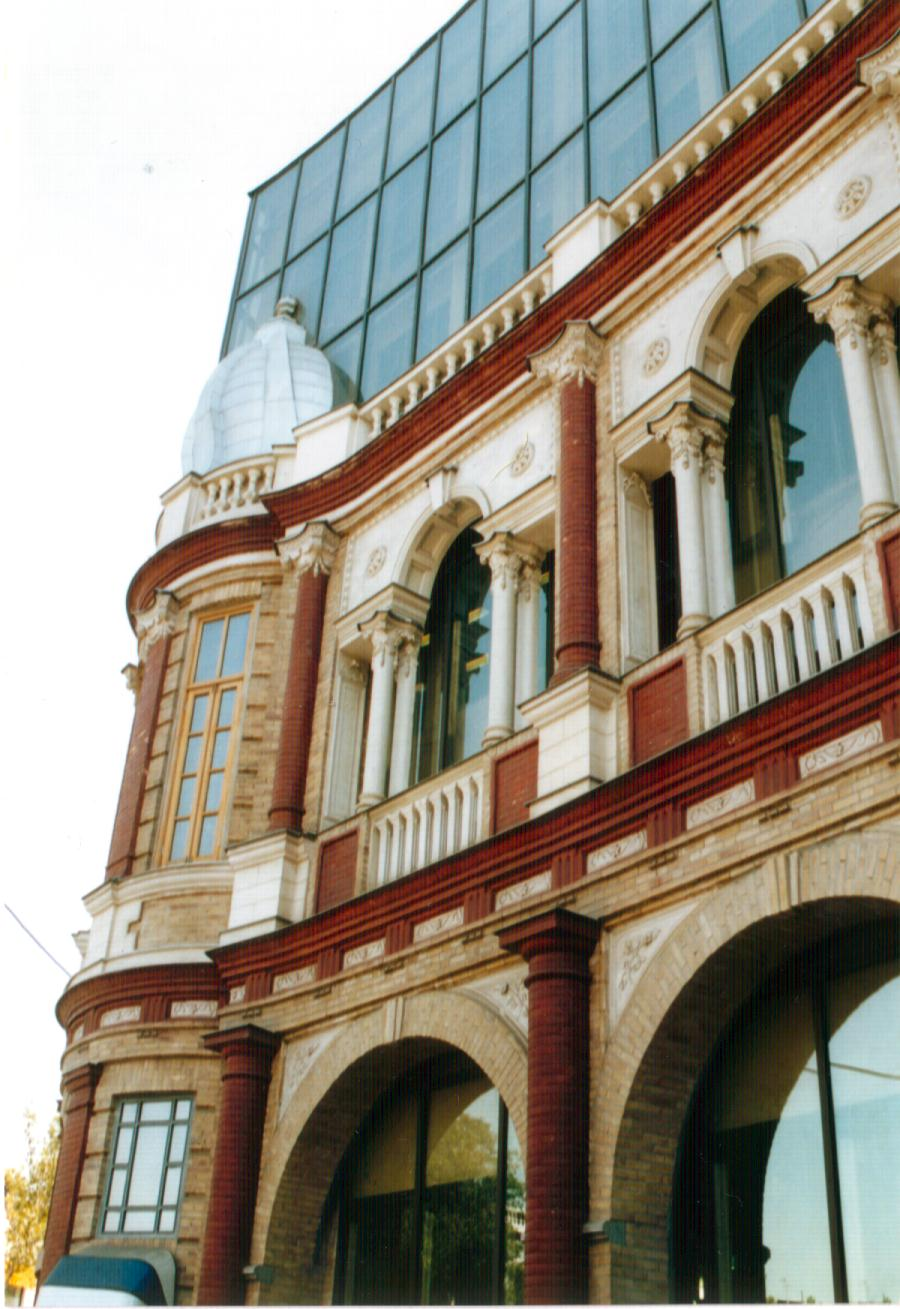

The surrounding buildings of Hasanabad Square were designed by Iranian-Armenian architect Qelich Baqelian, with the structural engineering provided by fellow Iranian-Armenian architect Leon Tadosian. In the 1970s, the southeastern corner of the four symmetrical buildings of Hasan-Abad were demolished for the construction of a new modern branch of Bank Melli, with irrelevant facade in the area. In the 1990s, a brick and stone shell, similar to the other corners were built on the lower walls of the bank building.

== Gallery ==
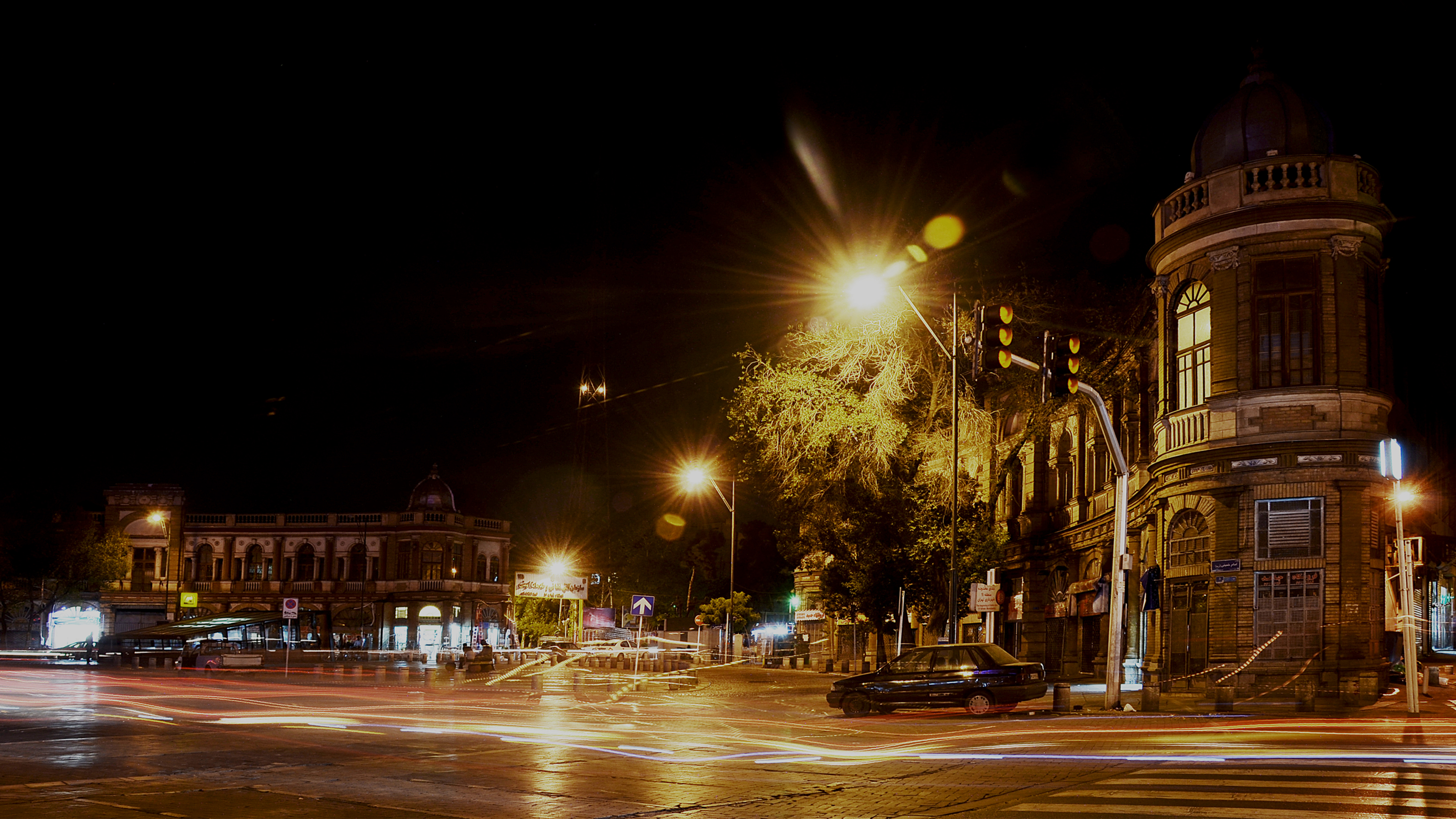
Hasan Abad Square

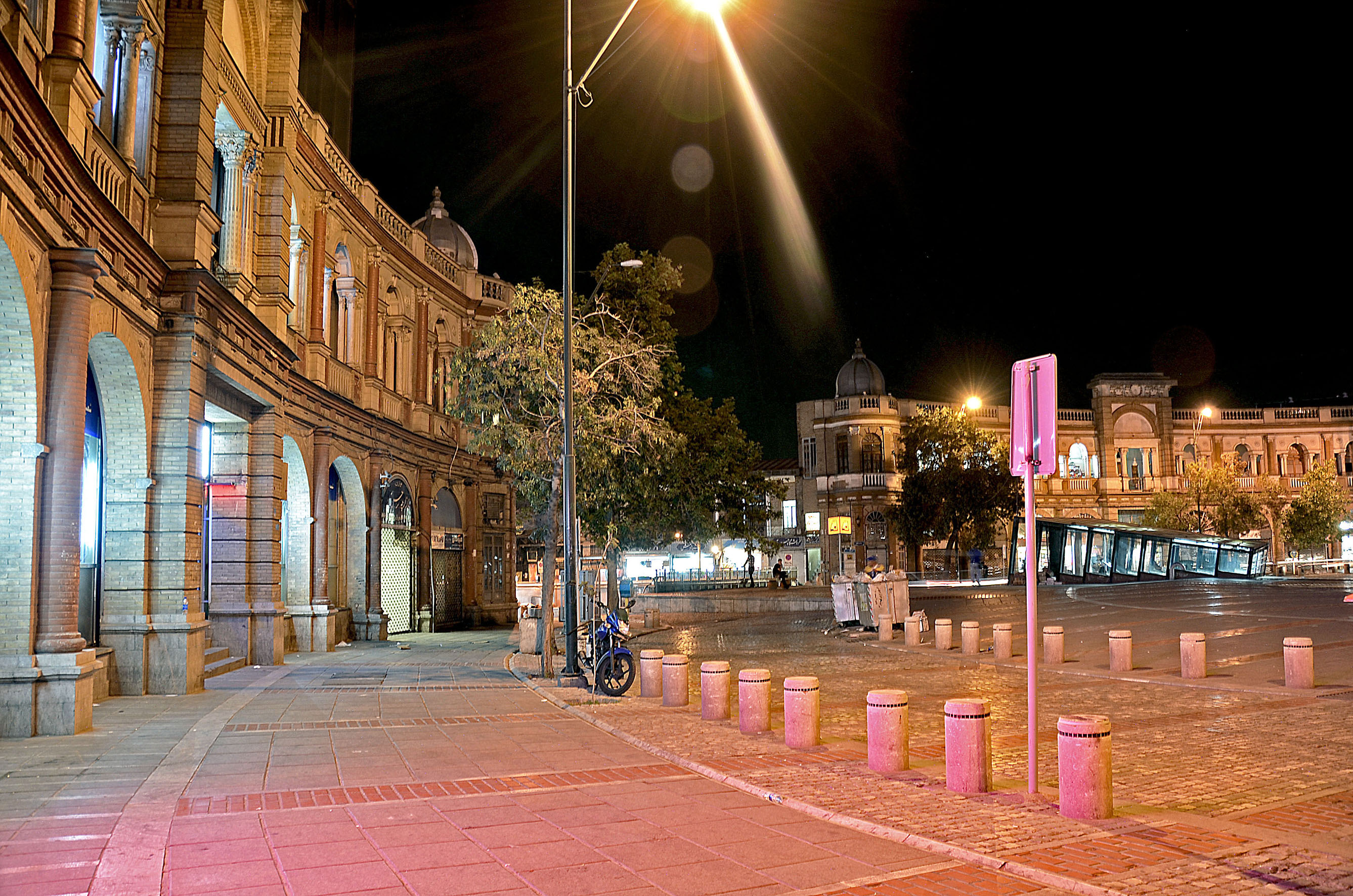
Hasan Abad Square

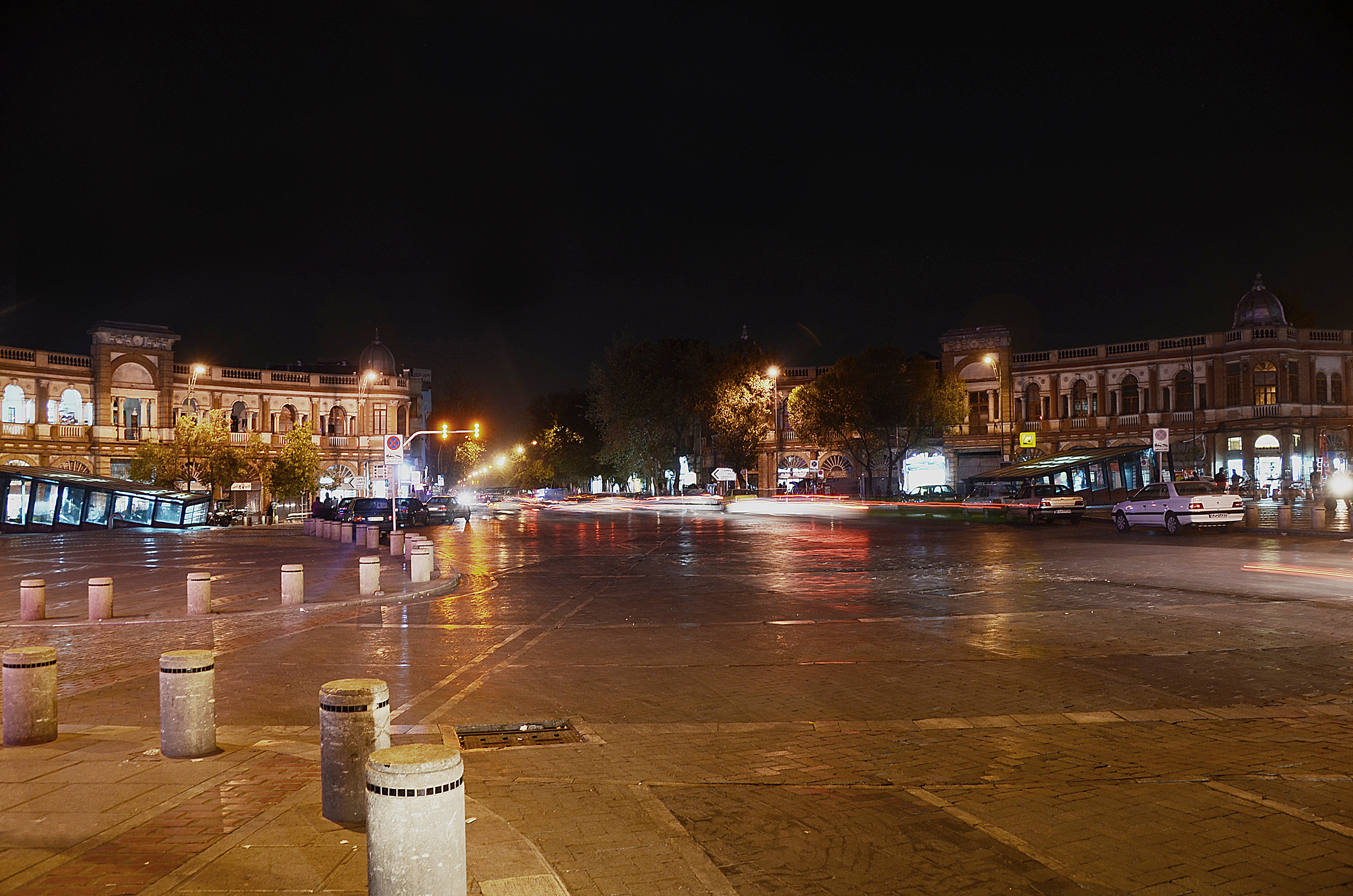
Hasan Abad Square

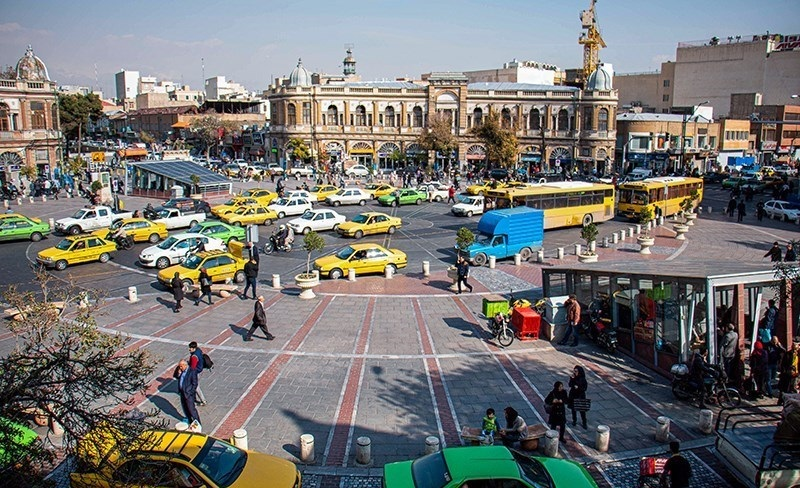
Hasan Abad

== See also ==
- Toopkhaneh
- National Garden, Tehran
- Ferdows Garden
- Museum of the Qasr Prison
