= Mirza Mousa Vazir Lashkar Ashtiani =

Iranian statesman (d. 1881)

Vazir Lashkar Mirza Mousa Ashtiani
- میرزا موسی وزیرلشکر آشتیانی
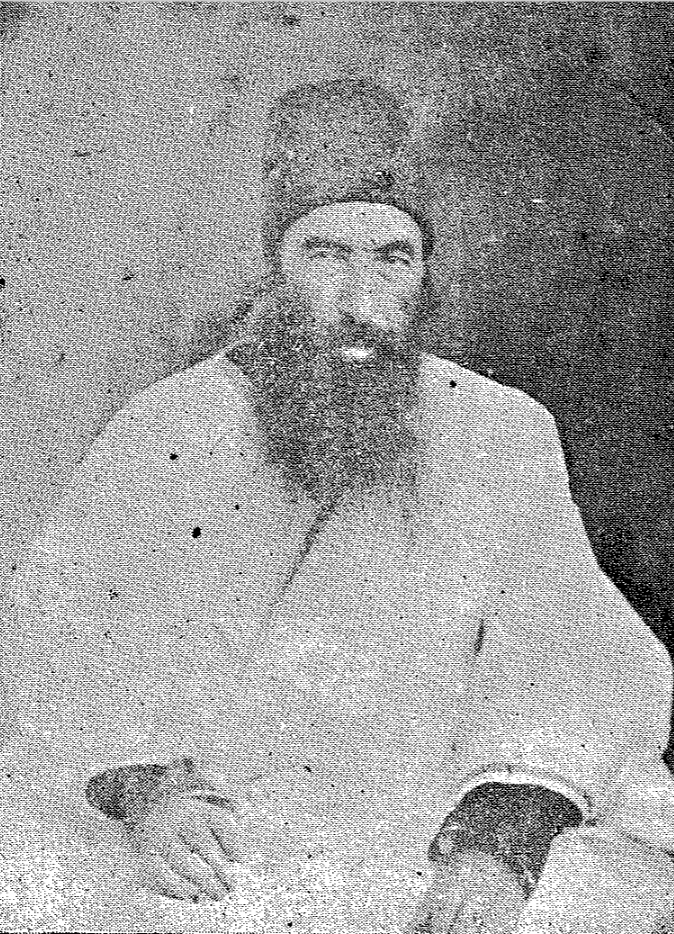

Vazir-Lashkar (Minister of the Army)
- In office 1871–1881
- Monarch: Naser al-Din Shah Qajar

Personal details
- Born: Qajar Iran
- Died: 29 April 1881
- Spouse(s): 3, among them; Amirzadeh Khanom, Mehrmah Khanum
- Children: 7
- Occupation: Statesman

Military service
- Allegiance: Qajar Iran

Mirza Mousa Vazir-Lashkar Ashtiani (Persian: میرزا موسی وزیرلشکر آشتیانی; d. 29 April 1881) was a prominent statesman during the reign of Naser al-Din Shah Qajar.

== Biography ==
Mirza Mousa followed the family tradition and entered the Divan-e Estifa' (دیوان استیفا; lit. Ministry of Finance) at a young age. In 1849, he was stationed in Qazvin, where he demonstrated competence in suppressing a local uprising that had led to the closure of the bazaar. His performance earned him the attention of Amir Kabir, who subsequently appointed him as the financial administrator of Khorasan. At that time, Khorasan was governed by Morad Mirza Hessam al-Saltaneh.

=== Rise to Power ===
In 1850, Amir Kabir was dismissed from office, and Mirza Aqa Khan Nuri became Grand Vizier. During this period, Mirza Mousa was promoted to the position of Minister of Khorasan. However, tensions soon arose between him and Hesam o-Saltaneh over financial matters in the province. While Hesam o-Saltaneh sought his dismissal, Mirza Aqa Khan insisted on retaining him. Although the disputes were eventually resolved, the Grand Vizier ultimately ordered Mirza Mousa's removal from office.

After a period of political inactivity, Mirza Mousa was appointed Minister of Qazvin. Eventually, he was granted independent governorship of the province.

=== Military Administration ===
In 1871, Naser al-Din Shah entrusted the administration of military affairs to Mirza Hossein Khan Sepahsalar. Given his familiarity with Mirza Mousa, Sepahsalar requested the Shah to appoint him as Vazir-Lashkar (وزیر لشکر; lit. Minister of the Army) and put him in charge of military finances. One of his first initiatives in this role was to conduct an audit of the Qurkhaneh (قورخانه; lit. state arsenal) and compile a comprehensive inventory of military equipment stored in Tehran and other regions. These records had not been updated since the tenure of Amir Kabir.

Mirza Mousa remained in office until his death in 1881.

=== Family ===
One of Mirza Musa's wives was Amirzadeh Khanom, the daughter of Mahmoud Mirza (the fifteenth son of Fath-Ali Shah Qajar). They had four children:

1. Mirza Hadi Montaser al-Molk Dadvar
2. Mirza Ali Ghavam al-Saltaneh Dadvar, father of Abdollah Dadvar, a renowned setar player
3. Vosuq al-Saltaneh Dadvar, Minister of War and Member of Parliament
4. Mokarram al-Saltaneh Dadvar

Another wife, Mehrmah Khanum Ismat al-Saltaneh, was the widow of Mirza Mohammad Qavam al-Dawla. From this marriage, they had a son named Mousa Moshir Akram. Mirza Mousa also had a third wife, with whom he had two daughters.
