= Abbas Mirza Molk-Ara =

Qajar prince (1839–1897)

Abbas Mirza
- Molk-Ara; Nayeb es-Saltaneh
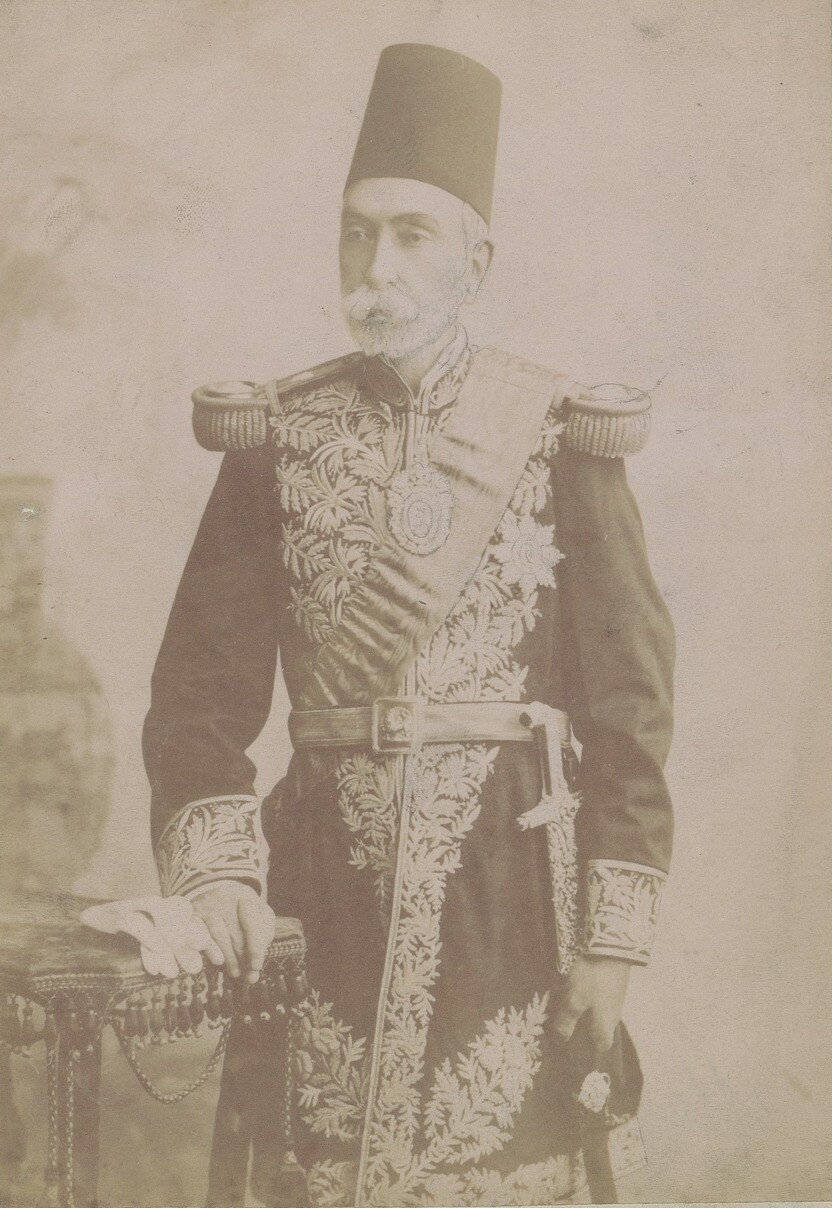
- Born: 27 November 1839; Tehran, Qajar Iran
- Died: 13 April 1897 (aged 57); Tehran, Qajar Iran
- Cause of death: Heart attack
- Dynasty: Qajar
- Father: Mohammad Shah Qajar
- Mother: Khadijeh Khanom Chehriqi
- Religion: Twelver Shia Islam

Abbas Mirza Molk-Ara (Persian: عباس میرزا ملک‌آرا; 27 November 1839 – 13 April 1897) was a Qajar prince and the half-brother of Naser al-Din Shah. His father Mohammad Shah, named him Abbas in memory of his own father Abbas Mirza. Some historians also believe that Mohammad Shah named his son Abbas out of respect for his mentor and prime minister, Mirza Abbas Iravani, better known as Haji Mirza Aqasi. His mother, Khadijeh Khanom Chehriqi, was the sister of Yahya Khan Chehriqi, one of the Kurdish leaders of Shekak tribe.

== Biography ==
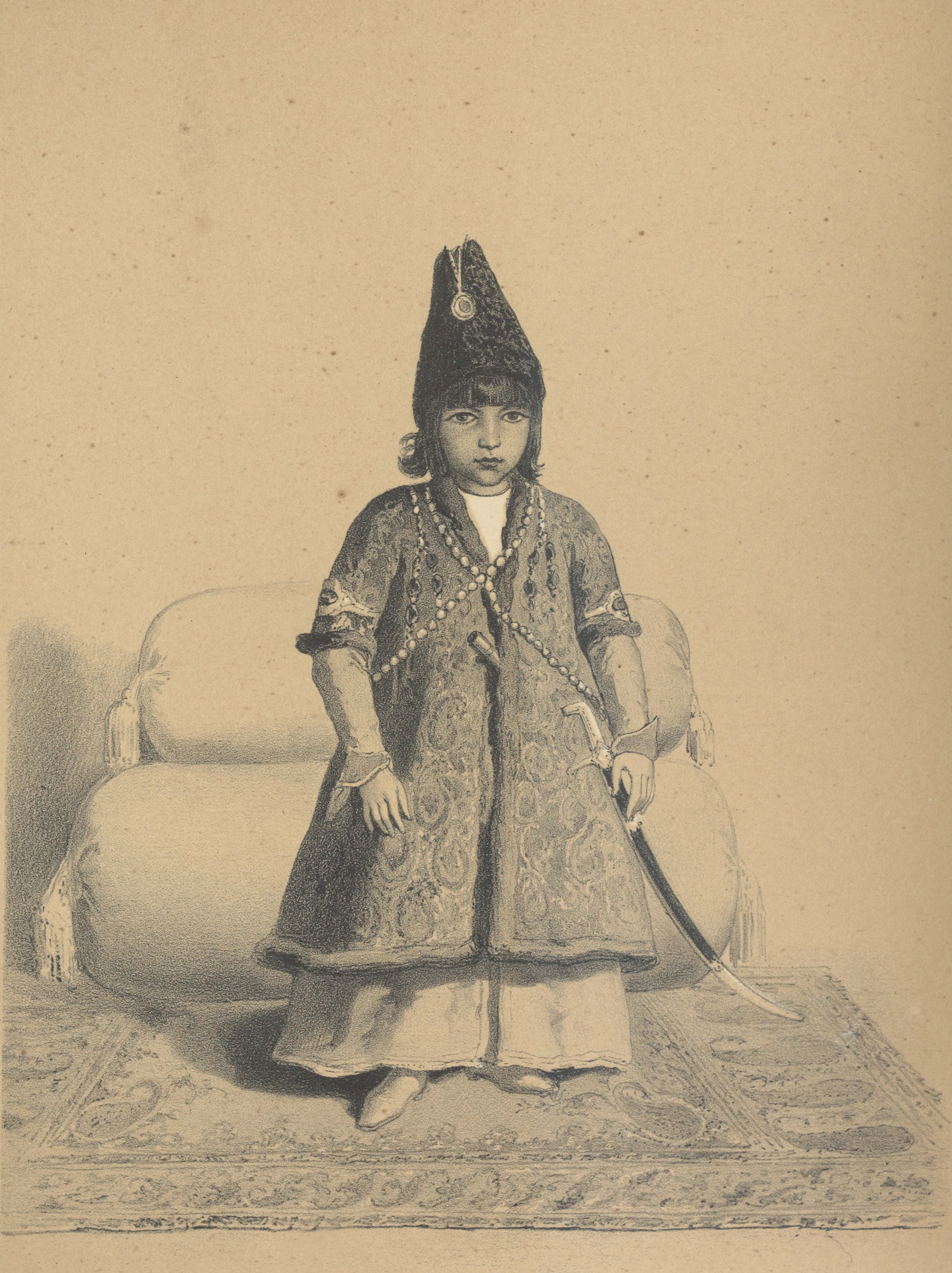
Abbas Mirza Molk-Ara Nayeb-al-saltana in his childhood; Alexey Saltykov (1806–1859); Published in 1850

Abbas Mirza was younger than Naser al-Din Shah and his mother was of Kurdish origin and followed Sunni Islam; these two factors prevented him from becoming crown prince. Mohammad Shah loved Abbas Mirza more than his other sons and granted him the title of “Nāyeb al-Saltaneh” (Deputy of the Sultanate). Abbas Mirza was viewed with suspicion by Naser al-Din Shah, as the Shah considered him a claimant to the throne. He spent 27 years in exile in Baghdad and Istanbul. In 1877 or 1878, he returned to Iran after obtaining permission from Naser al-Din Shah Qajar. The Shah granted him the title “Molk-Ārā” and appointed him governor of Zanjan. After some time, Abbas Mirza fled to the Caucasus out of fear but returned to Iran in 1879/1880 through the mediation of Mirza Hosein Khan Sepahsalar. In 1896, he replaced Mohsen Moshiro’d-Dowleh as Minister of Justice. Two years later, he died of a heart attack while horseback riding.

== Sources ==
- Amanat, Abbas (1997). Pivot of the Universe: Nasir al-Din Shah Qajar and the Iranian Monarchy, 1831–1896. Berkeley: University of California Press. ISBN 9780520914056. OCLC 44964072.
- Navāʾī, Abd ol-Hoseyn (1982). شرح حال عباس میرزا ملک‌آرا [Biography of Abbas Mirza Mulk Ara] (in Persian) (1st ed.). Tehran: Babak. pp. 18–39.
- Sa'adat Nuri, Hossein (1966). "حاج میرزا آقاسی" [Haj Mirza Aqasi]. یغما (in Persian) (210): 540–545.
- Bamdad, Mehdi (1984). شرح حال رجال ایران در قرن ۱۲ و ۱۳ و ۱۴ هجری [Biographies of the Notable Men of Iran in the 12th, 13th and 14th Islamic Centuries] (in Persian). Vol. 6. Zavvar. p. 294.
- Dehkhoda, Ali-Akbar (ed.). "ملک آرا" [Mulk Ara]. لغت‌نامه دهخدا [Dehkhoda Dictionary] (in Persian). University of Tehran.
