= Ahmad Farhad =

Pakistani poet

Ahmad Farhad Shah
- Born: 1986 (age 39–40); Bagh District, Azad Kashmir
- Occupations: Poet, journalist
- Known for: Urdu poetry, Journalism, Human rights activism
- Notable work: mantone منٹونے
- Spouse: Syeda Arooj Zainab (Ain Naqvi)
- Father: Syed Muhammad Hussain Shah
- Relatives: 7 brothers, 4 sisters

Ahmed Farhad Shah is a Pakistani (Kashmiri) Urdu poet and journalist. He has been associated with various media organizations including Bol News. Farhad is known for his strong criticism of the establishment. He often reported on the recent anti-government protests in Azad Kashmir. On the night of 14 May 2024 he mysteriously disappeared from his home in Islamabad. His disappearance sparked widespread concern, leading to legal proceedings and international outcry.

== Disappearance ==
On the night of 14 May 2024, Farhad went missing from his home in Islamabad. His family saw him being taken away. The Islamabad High Court Wednesday was informed regarding the whereabouts of missing Kashmiri poet Ahmed Farhad by Attorney General for Pakistan, Mansoor Usman Awan. The poet "turned up" in police custody in Azad Jammu and Kashmir. He was released on bail on June 14, but the charges and investigation against him remain and he remains under investigation.

=== Legal proceedings ===
After his disappearance, Farhad's family filed a petition in the Islamabad High Court (IHC), requesting that he be produced in court. The IHC ordered the government to produce Farhad by 24 May 2024 and said that if Farhad was not produced within the stipulated time, the court could summon the prime minister and his cabinet members.

== 2026 arrest ==
On 20 June 2026, Farhad was detained by police in Bagh while travelling home from reporting on a Jammu Kashmir Joint Awami Action Committee protest in Rawalakot. The Ireland-based human rights organisation Front Line Defenders reported that he was being held without a formal arrest warrant or legal grounds to justify doing so.

== Personal life ==
Farhad originally belongs to Bagh district of Azad Kashmir. His wife Syeda Urooj Zainab known as Ain Naqvi raised her voice about his disappearance and alleged threats.
