= Abd al-Wahhab Khan Asaf al-Dowleh =

Statesman in Iran (1826–1887)

Abd al-Wahhab Asaf al-Dowleh
- عبدالوهاب آصف‌الدوله
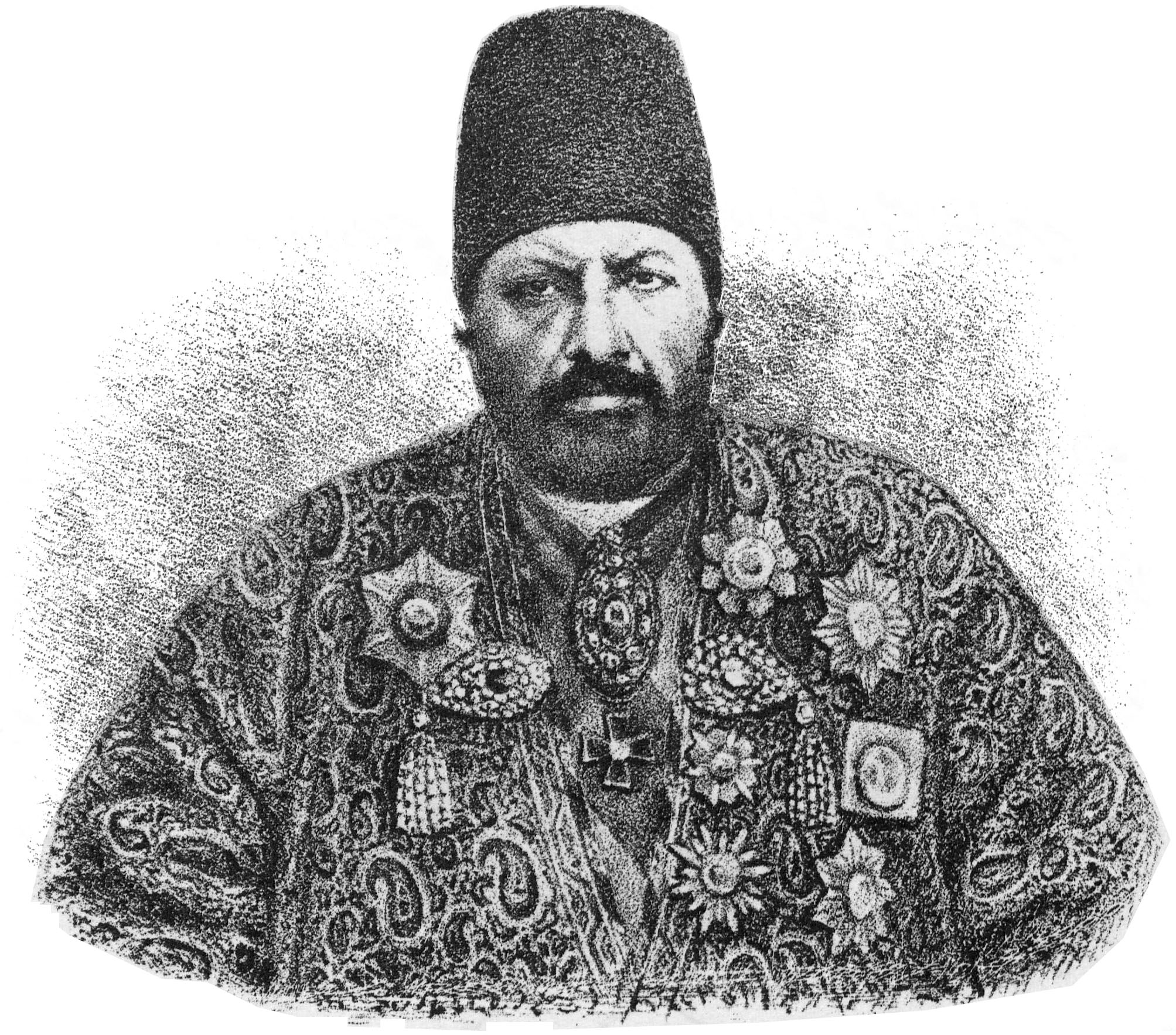
- Born: 1826; Shiraz, Qajar Iran
- Died: 1887 (aged 60–61); Tehran, Qajar Iran
- Other name: Nasir al-Dowleh
- Occupation: Statesman
- Spouse: Mehrmah Khanum Ismat al-Saltaneh
- Children: 2

Abd al-Wahhab Asaf al-Dowleh (Persian: عبدالوهاب آصف‌الدوله; 1826–1887), previously known by the title Nasir al-Dowleh (نصیرالدوله), was a statesman and minister during the reign of Naser al-Din Shah Qajar.

== Biography ==
He was born in Shiraz and moved to Tehran in 1849. He began his career in the administration of Etezad os-Saltaneh, the Minister of Sciences, where his intelligence and strong memory gained attention, leading to his rapid advancement. In 1856, he was appointed as the Second Deputy Minister of Foreign Affairs. Later, he held various positions, including the Agent for Foreign Affairs in Tabriz in 1860 and the Agent of Azerbaijan in 1865.

In 1871, he was granted the title Nasir al-Dowleh, and in 1884, he received the title Asaf al-Dowleh. Among his other appointments were the Governorship of Gilan, the Governorship of Khorasan, and the custodianship of the Astan Quds Razavi shrine.

=== Later years and death ===
A collection of documents from his tenure in Khorasan, titled Documents of Mirza Abd al-Wahhab Khan Asaf al-Dowleh (Selected Documents of Khorasan), was compiled by Abdolhossein Navaei and Niloufar Kasraei.

After returning from his governorship in Khorasan, Asaf al-Dowleh began showing signs of mental illness, which gradually worsened, forcing him into seclusion. He died in 1887 due to a heart attack.

His son, Ahmad Badr, later became a minister, and his daughter, Maryam, married Hassan Vosough (Vosough al-Dawlah).
