= Fereydun Adamiyat =

Fereydun Adamiyat فریدون آدمیت
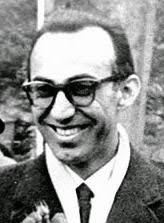
- Born: 23 July 1920; Tehran, Persia
- Died: 29 March 2008 (aged 87); Tehran, Iran
- Resting place: Behesht-e Zahra
- Education: Dar ul-Funun; University of Tehran
- Occupations: Iranian politician and historian
- Relatives: Abbas-Gholi Adamiyat (father)

Fereydun Adamiyat or Fereidoon Adamiyat (23 July 1920 in Tehran – 29 March 2008) (Persian: فریدون آدمیت) was a leading social historian of contemporary Iran and particularly the Qajar era. He was the son of Abbasquli Adamiyat, a pioneer of the Iranian Constitutional Revolution. Fereydun Adamiyat received his B.A. from the University of Tehran and his PhD in diplomatic history from the London School of Economics. He is known for his original works on various aspects of the social and political history of Persia, most of them dealing with the ideological foundations of the Iranian Constitutional Revolution. Believing firmly in history's "Rational Movement" (Persian: حرکت عقلی, harekat-e ʿaqlī), Adamiyat saw no conflict between normative judgement and claims to objectivity. Although predominantly published in Persian, he is often cited by Western scholars. His most famous book was Amir Kabir and Iran (Persian: Amīr Kabīr va Īrān) (one of several re-publications: Tehran: Kharazmi Publishing, 1975/1354).

Prior to his academic activity, Adamiyat was also a diplomat, serving as Iran's ambassador to the Netherlands and India. He also worked for the United Nations in various capacities.

== Scholarly criticism ==
Several other leading Iranists have criticised both Adamiyat's methods and his biases. Abbas Amanat noted that he 'is not free from some of the biases and misinterpretations of which he accuses others' and that his dichotomous portrayal of protagonists and antagonists 'give[s] his work a Manichean flavour appealing to readers in search of easy answers to complex historical problems'. Amanat also rejected Adamiyat's clear bias against both the West and Iranian minorities:

Moreover, in spite of his unacknowledged use of Western studies Adamiyat dismisses them all as ‘Western rubbish’ (bunjul-i farangī). In a characteristically caustic tone he accuses western specialists of fabrication, charlatanism, being in the service of political powers, and entertaining ‘Jewish evil designs’ (aghrāḍ-i yahūdīgarī).

Amanat also considers Adamiyat’s work on the history of the Bábí movement in the book Amir Kabir and Iran to be problematic. In the introduction to the book, Adamiyat promises to employ an analytical and unbiased method and claims that his historical analyses are realistic and logical. Amanat believes that he does not observe these values at all. Amanat regards the chapter “The Story of the Báb” in Amir Kabir and Iran as containing clear historical errors arising from Adamiyat’s careless methodology and insufficient information, and describes Adamiyat’s language in portraying the history and beliefs of the Bábí religion as, in several instances, highly polemical and insulting.

Likewise, Houchang Chehabi has provided examples of Adamiyat's 'hostile attitude towards both Bahaʾis and Jews', a result of his 'virulent nationalism [that] leads him to associate all religious minorities other than Zoroastrians with foreign powers'. Chehabi has demonstrated several cases in which Adamiyat intentionally misquoted and misrepresented his primary sources in order 'to fit his own conspiracy belief'. Furthermore, Adamiyat rejected the work of his scholarly colleagues due to racist opinions; he 'dismisses as worthless the writings of a number of Jewish scholars', among them the noted scholar Nikki Keddie, and 'accused Firuz Kazimzadah, a historian who happens to be a Bahaʾi, of harbouring a "fanatic hostility" towards Iran and Iranians, and ascribes these feelings to his religious affiliation'.
