= Mirza Yusuf Ashtiani =

Iranian politician (1812–1886)

Mirza Yusuf Ashtiani Mostowfi ol-Mamalek
- یوسف آشتیانی
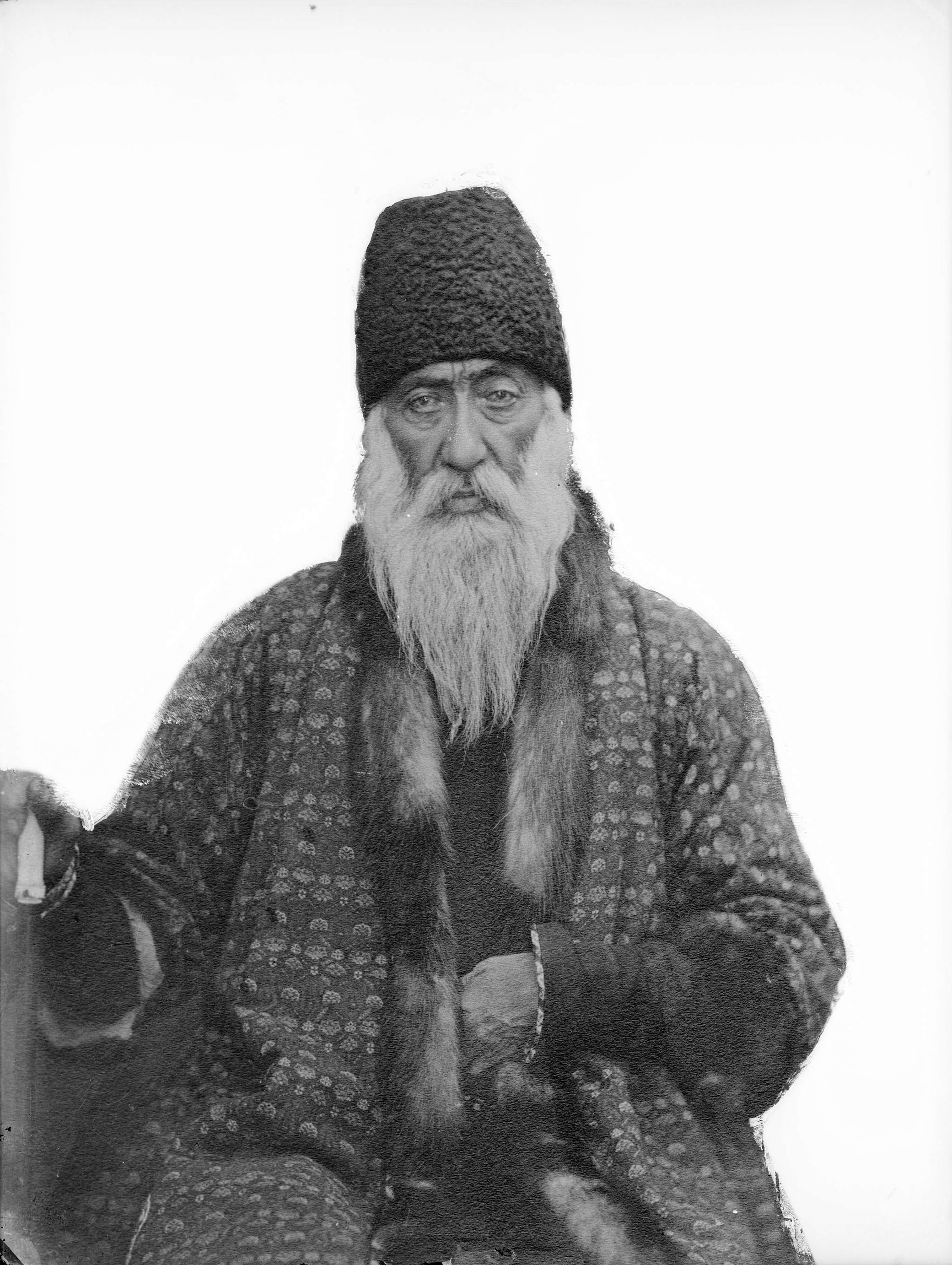
- Photograph by Antoin Sevruguin, c. 1880

Grand Vizier of Iran
- In office 1880 (unofficial) 24 June 1884 (official) – 7 April 1886
- Monarch: Naser al-Din Shah Qajar
- Preceded by: Mirza Hosein Khan Moshir od-Dowleh
- Succeeded by: Mirza Ali Asghar Khan Amin al-Soltan

Mostowfi ol-Mamalek (Minister of Finances)
- In office 1845–1884
- Monarchs: Mohammad Shah Qajar; Naser al-Din Shah Qajar
- Preceded by: Mirza Hassan Mostowfi ol-Mamalek Ashtiani
- Succeeded by: Mostowfi ol-Mamalek

Personal details
- Born: 1812 Ashtian, Qajar Iran
- Died: 7 April 1886 (aged 73–74)
- Children: Mirza Hasan Ashtiani
- Parent: Mirza Hassan Mostowfi ol-Mamalek Ashtiani

Mirza Yusuf Ashtiani (Persian: میرزا یوسف آشتیانی; 1812 – 7 April 1886) also known as Mostowfi ol-Mamalek (مستوفی الممالک) was a Grand Vizier of Iran during the reign of Naser al-Din Shah Qajar and one of the most influential members of the Qajar bureaucratic system. He was from the conservative faction of the Qajar court and an opponent of Mirza Hosein Khan Sepahsalar and his reforms.

Mirza Yusof Ashtiani, as one of the most influential members of Naser al-Din Shah's court, played a role in many important events of his time, including the removal of Mirza Mohammad Khan Sepahsalar, the poisoning of Hossein Gholi Khan Ilkhani, the establishment of the Qajar bureaucracy and the expansion of Tehran.

== Early life ==
Mirza Yusuf was born in Ashtian. He was from the Mostowfian Ashtiani family, who were inheritable the Mostowfi (treasurer) of Ashtian and sometimes the court. After his father's death, he became known as Mostowfi ol-Mamalek and took over the presidency of Mostowfis.

== Political career ==
He was considered and trusted by Amir Kabir due to his honesty and professionalism. When Mirza Aqa Khan Nuri came to power, he was afraid of Mirza Yusuf's influence and closeness. In addition, he always preferred to place his relatives and trustees in important positions, so he caused the deportation of Mirza Yusuf to Ashtian and gave the presidency of Mostowfis to his son Mirza Kazem Nizam al-Mulk. After the dismissal of Mirza Aga Khan, he was again summoned to Tehran and regained his inherited position.

Later, he became the tutor of Kamran Mirza, the young son of the Shah, a job that was equivalent to the government of Tehran and the director of real estate. After that, his sphere of influence and power gradually increased, until Naser al-Din Shah became acquainted with the reformist ideas of Mirza Hosein Khan Sepahsalar. Hosein Khan constantly spoke to Naser al-Din Shah regarding the need for reform in Iran, so the shah dismissed Mirza Yusuf and respectfully sent him to Ashtian. He was away from the political scene for two years, until he was called to Tehran after the dismissal and exile of Hosein Khan to Gilan. After the exile of Hosein Khan, Mirza Yusuf informally served as the Grand Vizier from 1880 and formally from 1884 until his death in 1886.

In 1882, Mirza Yusuf noticed the rise to power of Hossein Gholi Khan Ilkhani, a Bakhtiari khan who had recently entered into an alliance with Mass'oud Mirza Zell-e Soltan, and on his orders he was poisoned with Qajar coffee. The expansion of Tehran during the reign of Naser al-Din Shah was done under the supervision of Mirza Yusuf. He bought and settled many lands around Tehran from Naser al-Din Shah. Hassanabad, Yusef Abad, Behjatabad, Abbasabad, Amirabad and Vanak were among his gardens, and now neighbourhoods with the same names have been built in their place. Mirza Yusuf appointed many of his relatives, such as Mirza Musa Ashtiani, and made reforms in the Qajar bureaucracy that were very powerful in favour of princes, governors, and courtiers. Mirza Yousef Ashtiani supported artists and politicians in addition to assassinating and suppressing many of his opponents.

During the office of Mirza Yusuf, Naser al-Din Shah gradually disregarded the duties of the monarchy and increasingly sought refuge in isolation and his own interests within the Qajar harem. Mirza Yusuf took advantage of the Shah's position and became the most powerful man in the court. Naser al-Din Shah, who did not call anyone "Jenaab", called him "Jenaab Agha" (Your Excellency).

He was known for his humility and good morals, as he cherished the dervishes and befriended them. Alchemy was one of his favorite pastimes, and he was also interested in agriculture, horticulture, and bird breeding. Mirza Yusuf Ashtiani died on 7 April 1886; his title was inherited by his son, Mirza Hasan Ashtiani, who later became Prime Minister under Ahmad Shah Qajar and Reza Shah.

== Legacy ==
Mirza Yusuf Ashtiani had a great influence on the time after him. Before him, the Shah and the Prime Minister (Grand Vizier) were two important poles and had the equal power, but with the reforms he made in the Qajar bureaucracy, the power of the Prime Minister increased sharply, and this increase grew even greater with the Constitutional Revolution. The role of Mirza Yusuf in the influence of his family, the Mostowfian Ashtiani, is also very important because before him, the members of this family did not have much role in the court, but after him, five members of this family became prime minister. In today's society, he is known also as the person who made the Qajar coffee tradition to poison the opposition.

== Honours ==
- Order of Homayoun (Persian: نشان تمثال همایون), 1869
- Order of the Lion and the Sun, 1874
- Neshan-e Aqdas, 1st Class, 1880
- Order of Ali (Persian: نشان تمثال امیرالمؤمنین), 1880
