= Anglo-Persian Agreement =

1919 agreement between the United Kingdom and Persia

The Anglo-Persian Agreement, known in Iran as the Contract of 1919 (Persian: قرارداد ۱۹۱۹) involved the United Kingdom and Persia (official exonym of Iran at the time), and centered on the drilling rights of the Anglo-Persian Oil Company. The "agreement" was issued by British Foreign Secretary, Lord Curzon, to the Persian government in August 1919. It was never ratified by the Majlis (Iranian parliament).

After the 1917 Bolshevik Revolution, the new Soviet government abandoned the former Russian sphere of influence in the five northern provinces of Iran, branding the concept as "Tsarist Imperialism". Britain was the remaining power in the region and Curzon hoped to make Iran not a protectorate but a client state of Britain and of no other great power.

The document gave a guarantee of British access to all Iranian oil fields. In return the British would:

- Supply munitions and equipment for a British-trained army
- Provide a 2 million sterling loan for "necessary reforms"
- Revise the Customs tariff
- Survey and build railroads.

The document was criticized by foreign observers as hegemonic, especially in the United States, which also had designs on accessing Iranian oil fields. Eventually, the Anglo-Persian Agreement was formally denounced by the Majlis on 22 June 1921.

== See also ==
- Anglo-Russian Convention
