= Nausherwan Street =

Street in Isfahan, Iran

Imam Khomeini Streetبزرگراه دو طبقه امام خمینی (ره) اصفهان is one of the most famous streets in the 12th district of Isfahan Province, Iran. In fact, the concrete flyover bridge that was built over it and its importance, made this street eminent and hard to ignore. It is also the way between Kharrazi Expressway and Isfahan-Tehran freeway.

== Name ==
Before the Islamic revolution it was called Nausherwan Street (Persian: خیابان انوشیروان) after the prime minister of prominent king Khosrow I. But after the Islamic Revolution it was renamed Imam Khomeini street after the revolution's leader Ruhollah Khomeini

== Concrete bridge or elevated expressway development ==
Three phases of flyover bridges have been built

	Working values: Ground and underground operations	Concrete work	shuttering	Soil and stone
2006 bridge overpasses Imam Khomeini avenue	60,000 cubic meters	70000 cubic meters	150,000 Metal works (rebar): 9000000 kg	
2007 Bridge over the Imam Khomeini Highway		32,000 cubic meters	40,000 sq. M Metal work (rebar): 4,200,000 kg	21,500 m 3
2008-9		55,000 cubic meters	110,000 sq.m. Metal work (rebar): 8,000,000 kg	22,000 cubic meters

== Neighborhoods ==
Asheq abad:

Ashegh Abad neighborhood from the west to Imam Khomeini (RA) street, south to Golzar Street, and east and north to Marchein desert.

The neighborhood with a total area of 2254423 square meters is home to 168336 people. Population density in Asheghabad neighborhood is 72 people per hectare.

Kowsar Township:

In this town with an area of 958936 square meters, 10915 people live. Population density in Ko'ars is 118 people per hectare.

Mahmoud Abad neighborhood:

Mahmood Abad neighborhood is located south of Rajaee Street and west to Seyyed Mostafa Mahmoud Abadi Street. In this neighborhood with an area of 806399 square meters, 5492 inhabitants reside. Population density in Mahmoud Abad neighborhood is 68 people per hectare.

Montazeri Town:

The town with its total area of 852,853 square meters has 2709 people. Population density in Montazeri is 31 people per hectare.

Malekshahr (ملک شهر، ملکشهر) Malek City:

The Malek city is located north of Fajr, along the Baharestan street, from the south to the Khiaban-e-Al-Hoda street and from the west to Mofattah Street.

The area of the neighborhood is 1874201 square meters, with 35,118 people living in this area. Population density is 187 people per hectare.

Negin Township:

In this town with an area of 801050 square meters, 10394 people live. The population density in Negin is 113 people per hectare.

Naser Khosrow:

Naser Khosrow neighborhood from the north to Abu Tourabi Street, south to Naser Khosrow Street, west to agricultural land and from the east to the intersection of Abu Tourabi Street.

The neighborhood, with a total area of 618885 square meters, has 17,616 people. Population density in Naser Khosro district is 225 people per hectare.

== Important organisations ==
There is two fire station department placed on the street. Department of social security of Isfahan province's second branch is located on the street. The west 63/20 kilowatt electric power station is based on the street. Transit is supported by BRT lane. Kowsar Market No 13 is built there. The street is in region two of health department of Isfahan University of Medical Sciences.
