= Mehdi Bamdad =

Iranian historian and writer (died 1973)

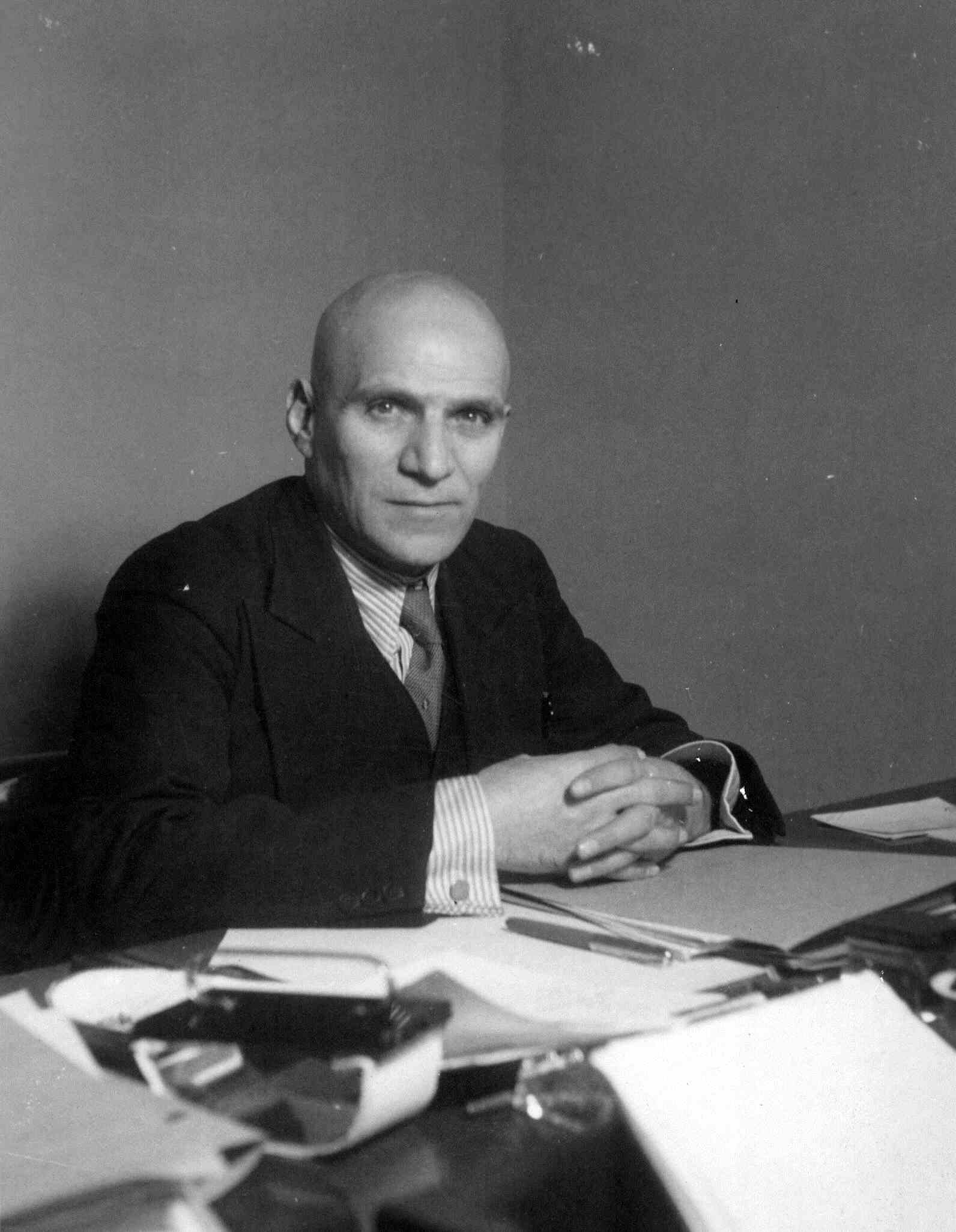
Photograph of Mehdi Bamdad

Mehdi Bamdad (Persian: مهدی بامداد; died 1973) was an Iranian civil servant who is principally known as the author of the Sharh-e hal-e rejal-e Iran dar qorun-e 12 va 13 va 14 hejri ("Biographies of [notable] personages of Iran in the 18th, 19th, and 20th centuries"). Because it was the first attempt to compile a national biography of Iran, Bamdad's work is considered significant, particularly for the images it includes.

== Sources ==
- Mousavi, Mehdi (2021). "Bāmdād, Mahdī". In Fleet, Kate; Krämer, Gudrun; Matringe, Denis; Nawas, John; Rowson, Everett (eds.). Encyclopaedia of Islam (3rd ed.). Brill Online. ISSN 1873-9830.
- Sirjani, Ali-Akbar Sa'idi (1988). "Bāmdād, Mahdī". In Yarshater, Ehsan (ed.). Encyclopædia Iranica (Online ed.). Encyclopædia Iranica Foundation. ISBN 978-0710090959.
