= Ottoman–Persian War (1820–1823) =

Series of conflicts fought between the Ottoman Empire and Qajar Iran from 1820 to 1823

Ottoman–Persian War of 1820–1823
- Part of the Ottoman–Persian Wars
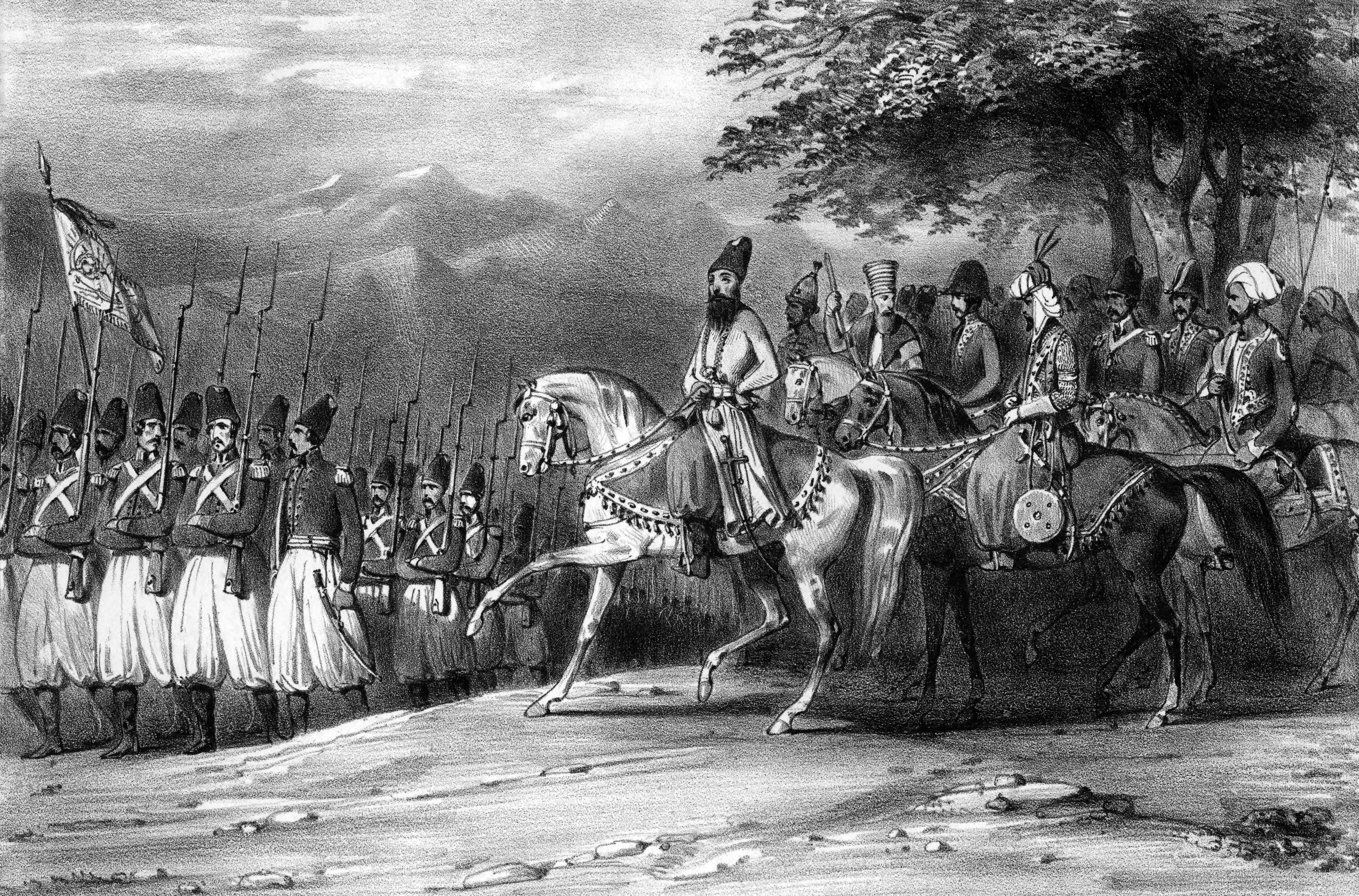
- A depiction of Qajar Crown Prince Abbas Mirza leading the Persian army.
Date	October 1820 – 23 July 1823
Location	Ottoman-Persian border, Eastern Anatolia, Iraq
Result	Inconclusive; Treaty of Erzurum

Belligerents
Ottoman Empire; (Ottoman Empire) Pashalik of Iraq	Qajar Iran

Commanders and leaders
(Ottoman Empire) Mahmud II (Ottoman Empire) Dawud Pasha of Baghdad (Ottoman Empire) Mehmed Emin Rauf Pasha (Ottoman Empire) Mir Muhammad of Rawanduz (Ottoman Empire) Koca Hüsrev Mehmed Pasha	Fath-Ali Shah Qajar; Abbas Mirza; Mohammad-Ali Mirza # Mohammad-Hossein Mirza; Musa Khamis; Ehsan Khan Nakhichevansky

Strength
Eastern Anatolia; Unknown 1821 (Baghdad); 10,000 or 3,900 Infantry; 8,800 cavalry 1822 (Eastern Anatolia); Unknown	Abbas Mirza's forces in Eastern Anatolia; 50,640 1821 (Iraq); 40,000 1822 (Eastern Anatolia); 35,000

Casualties and losses
Unknown	Heavy losses due to the pandemic

The Ottoman–Persian War of 1820–1823 was fought between the Ottoman Empire and Qajar Iran from 1820 to 1823.

== Background ==
Tensions between the two empires had been rising due to the Ottoman Empire's harboring of rebellious tribesmen from the Iranian Azerbaijan Province. The issues concerning the Kurdish borderland tribes, such as the Haydaran and Sipki tribes, had complicated the relations between the two empires. For instance, Iran launched a military campaign against Dervish Pasha, the muhafiz of Van, when he refused to return the Sipki Kurdish who took refuge and settled in Archesh.

Following a series of incidents at the border, Sultan Mahmud II declared war on Iran in October 1820 and appointed Koca Hüsrev Pasha, the Governor of Erzurum, to lead the campaign in the north, while the Mamluks of Baghdad conducted operations in the south. The Ottoman-Iranian War that began in 1820 was also part of a series of wars between the two empires, which was attributed to the influences of foreign powers, particularly Great Britain and the Russian Empire. The Iranians and the Ottomans were within their respective spheres of influence and were drawn to their rivalry. The Russian Empire was attempting to put pressure on the Ottoman Empire, which was then at war with the Greeks.

== War ==
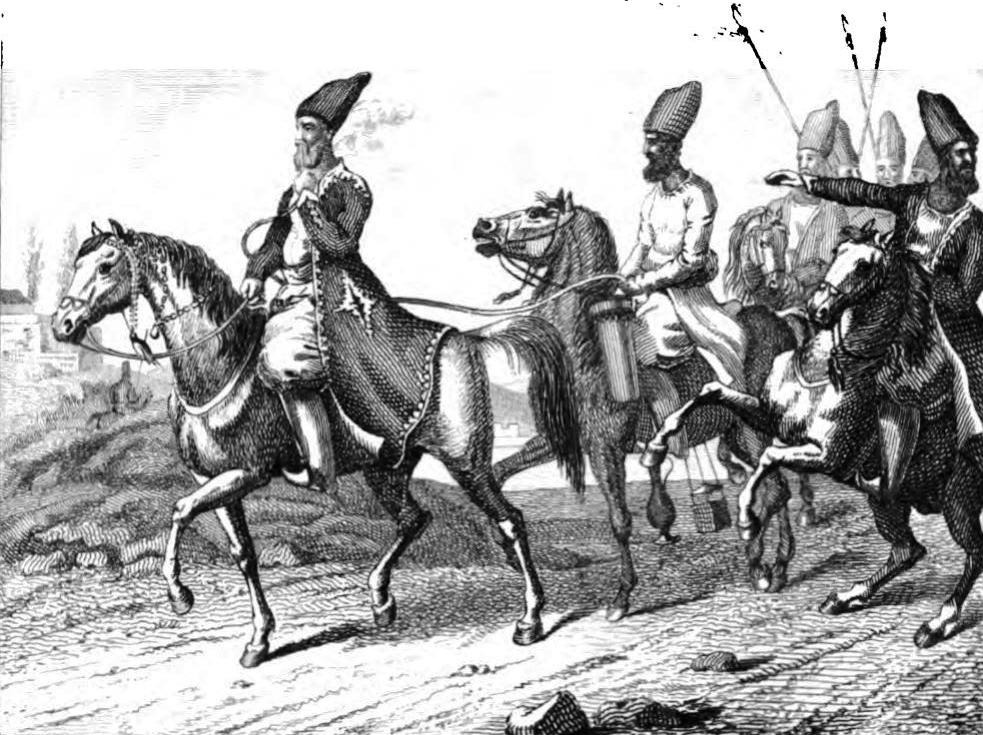
A Persian Cavalier smoking (Letters from the Caucasus and Georgia)

Following a series of border incidents, a large Persian force commanded by Hasan Khan of Revan entered Ottoman territory in September 1820 in pursuit of members of the Haydaran tribe who had fled to the Muş region. According to Ottoman archival records, the objective of this campaign was to bring the tribe members back; failing that, the aim was to plunder their property and take their women captive. Following the border incidents, Sultan Mahmud II declared war on Iran in October 1820 and appointed Koca Hüsrev Pasha, the Governor of Erzurum, to command the northern campaign, while the Mamluks of Baghdad conducted operations in the south. Crown Prince Abbas Mirza of Iran, at the instigation of the Russian Empire, invaded Western Armenia and the areas surrounding the Iranian province of Azerbaijan. On 10 September 1821, the Iranian forces marched out of Tabriz towards the border. On 16 September, Iranian forces crossed the border at Gürbulak and stormed the Bayezid Fortress in November 1821, securing Iranian supply routes. As the Iranian army marched into the region, they went after the Heydaran tribesmen, who would flee to Diyarbakir.

After Abbas Mirza's successful winter campaign, he withdrew most of his forces to Tabriz while leaving garrisons in significant towns and cities. The Turks began to organize a counterattack, organized under the new serasker, Mohammad Amin Rauf Pasha. They planned to steamroll the garrisons in Eastern Anatolia and occupy parts of Azerbaijan to prevent Iran from gathering its troops and force a peace on Ottoman terms. However, the fortress of Toprah Kaleh stood in the way of Ottoman plans due to its strategic location. The Sardar of Erevan kept raiding Ottoman positions around Toprah Kaleh, allowing Abbas Mirza precious time to recover forces to relieve the fortress. The resulting battle in May 1822 was a defeat for the Ottomans, but the Iranians were unable to take advantage of their success.

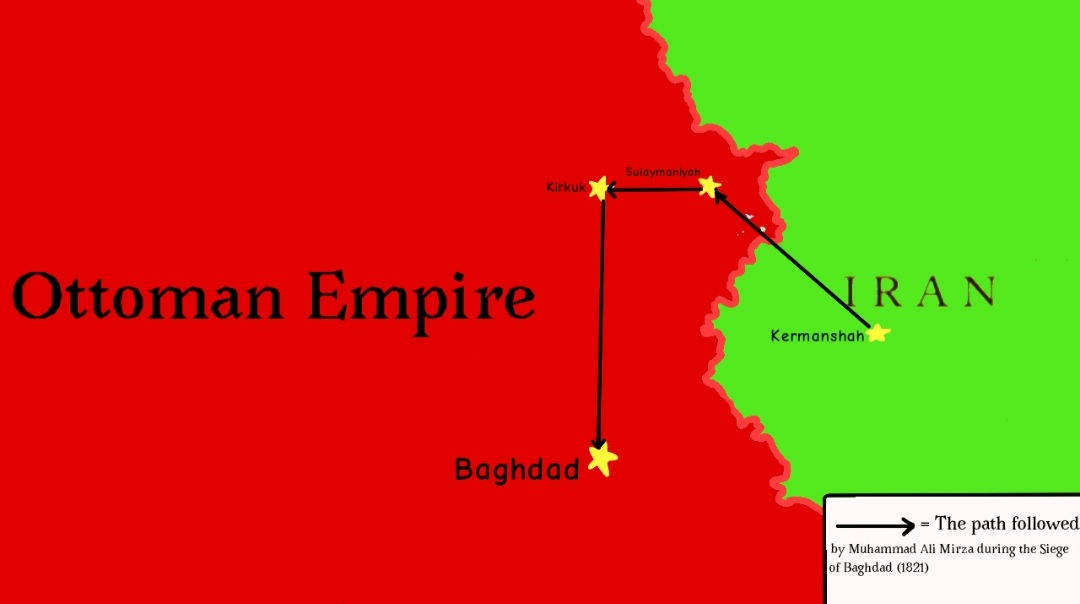
The path followed by Mohammad Ali Mirza during the siege

A second counterattack was organized by the Ottoman Wali (governor) of Baghdad, Dawud Pasha, who invaded Iran. The invasion was unsuccessful and he was pursued by the Qajar army under the lead of the Shah's oldest son, prince Mohammad Ali Mirza. The Ottomans retreated back to their own territory, while the Iranians took Shahrezur along the Sirvan River, supported by the Feyli Kurds and Feyli Lurs who defeated the Ottoman opposition and forced them to further retreat to Kirkuk. Mohammad Ali Mirza conquered Sulayméniyah and following the capture of Samarra, besieged Baghdad with 40,000 infantry and artillery. The Ottoman retreat ended here, as Dawud Pasha successfully defended the city with 3,900 infantry and 8,800 cavalry, preventing the Qajars from taking strategically important Baghdad. Combined with the effects of a cholera outbreak, Mohammad Ali Mirza was ultimately forced to lift the siege. Mohammad Ali Mirza himself caught the disease during the siege, and died on November 22, while in Ctesiphon.

Meanwhile, Abbas Mirza marched into eastern Anatolia with 30,000 troops and met an Ottoman army of 50,000 at the Battle of Erzurum (1821) Abbas Mirza scored a crushing victory over the Ottomans despite being severely outnumbered and his army suffering from a cholera epidemic.

== Result ==
Peace was not concluded until the Treaty of Erzurum two years later; both sides recognized the previous borders established by the Treaty of Zuhab in 1639, with no territorial changes. Also included in the treaty, was the guaranteed access for Persian ziyarat to the holy sites of Mecca and Medina within the Ottoman Empire.

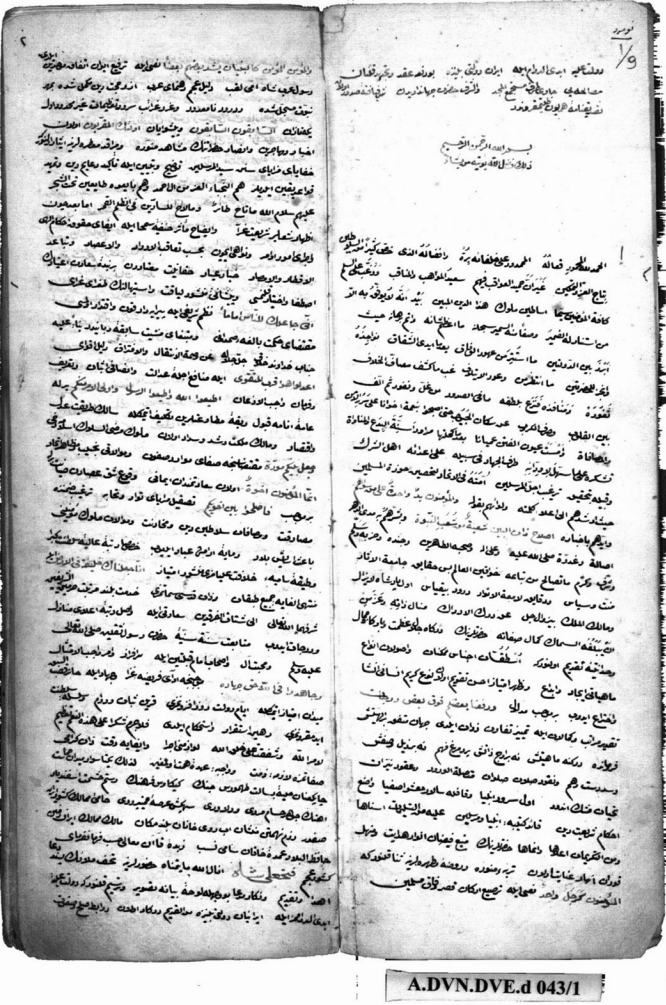
Treaty of Erzurum, Ottoman Archives

== Sources cited ==
- Ateş, Sabri (2013). Ottoman-Iranian Borderlands: Making a Boundary, 1843–1914. New York: Cambridge University Press. ISBN 9781107033658.
- Williamson, Graham (2008). "The Turko-Persian War of 1820-1823: winning the war but losing the peace". In Farmanfarmaian, Roxane (ed.). War and Peace in Qajar Persia: Implications Past and Present. Routledge. ISBN 9781134103089.
- Mikaberidze, Alexander (2011). Conflict and Conquest in the Islamic World: A Historical Encyclopedia. Santa Barbara, CA: ABC-CLIO. ISBN 9781598843361.
- Sicker, Martin (2001). The Islamic World in Decline: From the Treaty of Karlowitz to the Disintegration of the Ottoman Empire. Praeger.
- Sorkhabi, Rasoul (2017). Tectonic Evolution, Collision, and Seismicity of Southwest Asia: In Honor of Manuel Berberian's Forty-Five Years of Research Contributions. Boulder, Colorado: Geological Society of America. ISBN 9780813725253.
- Tucker, Spencer C., ed. (2010). A Global Chronology of Conflict: From the Ancient World to the Modern Middle. Vol. III. ABC-CLIO.
- Ward, Steven R. (2009). Immortal: A Military History of Iran and Its Armed Forces. Georgetown University Press.
