= Ali Khan Maragha'i =

Iranian court minister (1807/08–1867)

- Photograph of Ali Khan Maragha'i by Aqa Reza Akkasbashi, between 1863 and 1865
- Born: 1807/08; Qajar Iran
- Died: 1 August 1867; Tehran, Qajar Iran
- Burial place: Qom
- Children: Mohammad Hasan Khan E'temad os-Saltaneh

Ali Khan Maragha'i (Persian: علی خان مراغه‌ای; 1807/08–1867) was a 19th-century Iranian official who served as the farrash-bashi (court minister) during the early reign of Naser al-Din Shah Qajar (r. 1848–1896).

== Biography ==
Ali Khan was the son of a certain Hossein Khan Moqaddam Maragha'i. He was a member of the Moqaddam tribe of Maragheh, which had assisted the Qajars in their earliest military operations. At a very young age, Ali Khan started working as a golam-bacha (court page) under prince Mohammad Mirza (the future monarch Mohammad Shah Qajar) during the latters governorship of Maragheh. Following Mohammad Mirza's appointment as heir apparent in 1834, Ali Khan was appointed as his shanduqdar (master of the wardrobe). Mohammad Mirza was crowned as shah later that year, which led to Ali Khan's appointment as the khvansalar (chief of the royal household). Ali Khan became well known for both his role in the execution of the former prime minister Amir Kabir and his persecution of the early Babis.

In 1865/66, Ali Khan was given the position of wazir-e wazayef va awqaf (minister of pious foundations) and in 1866/67 he was additionally given the governorship of Hamadan. He died in Tehran on 1 August 1867 and was buried at Qom. His sons held important government offices; the most well-known was Mohammad Hasan Khan E'temad os-Saltaneh, who wrote a number of important books on Qajar history.

== Sources ==
- Amanat, Abbas (1997). Pivot of the Universe: Nasir Al-Din Shah Qajar and the Iranian Monarchy, 1831-1896. I.B.Tauris. ISBN 978-1845118280.
- Amanat, Abbas (1998). "Eʿtemād-al-Salṭana Moḥammad-Ḥasan Khan Moqaddam Marāḡaʾī". In Yarshater, Ehsan (ed.). Encyclopædia Iranica. Vol. VIII/6: Eršād al-zerāʿa–Eʿteżād-al-Salṭana. London and New York: Routledge & Kegan Paul. pp. 662–666. ISBN 978-1-56859-055-4.
- Busse, H. (1985). "ʿAlī Khan Ḥāǰeb-al-dawla". In Yarshater, Ehsan (ed.). Encyclopædia Iranica. Vol. I/8: Alafrank–Alp Arslan. London and New York: Routledge & Kegan Paul. pp. 867–868. ISBN 978-0-71009-097-3.
