= Tahmasp Mirza Moayyed od-Dowleh =

Iranian prince and governor (d. 1879/80)

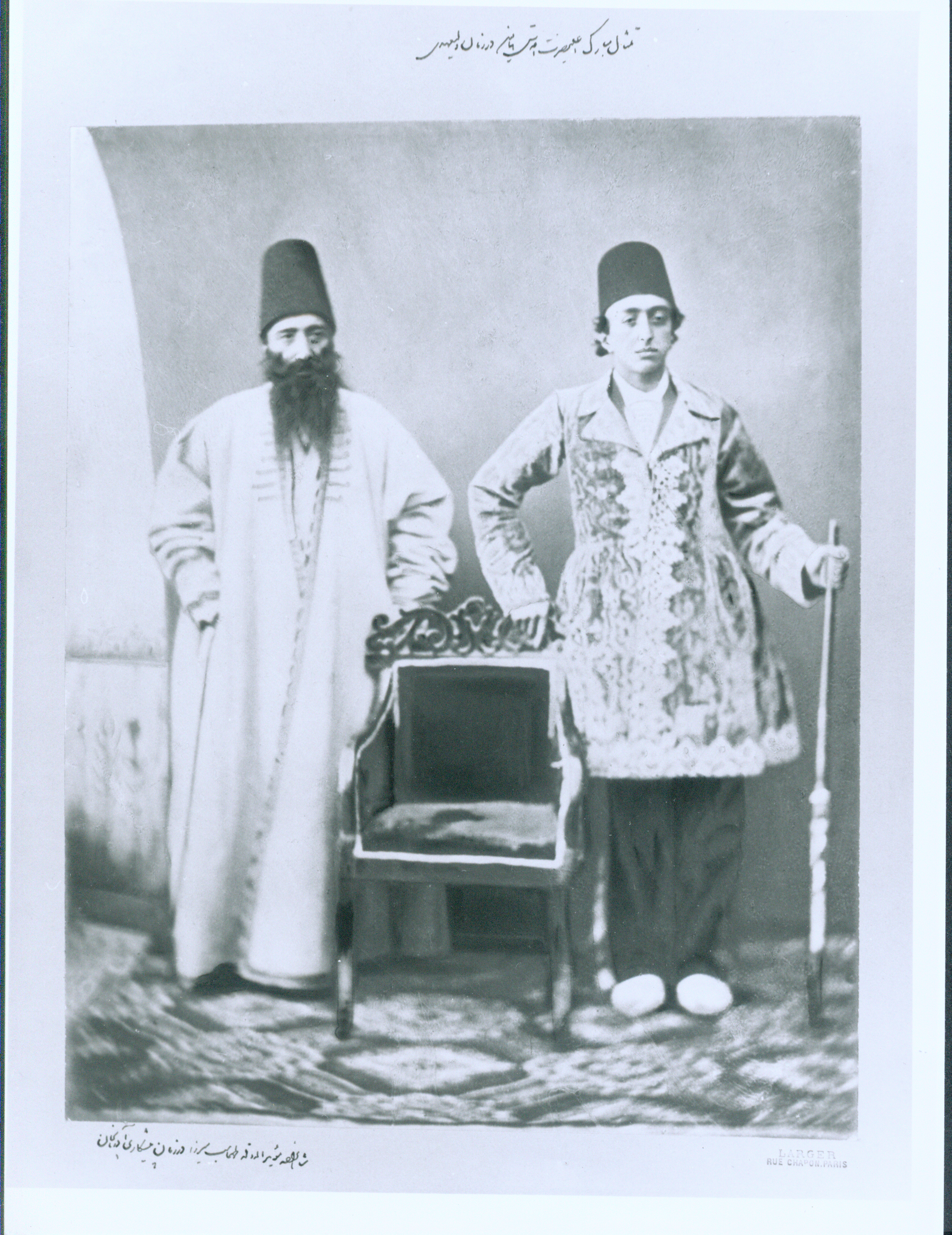
Tahmasp Mirza Moayyed od-Dowleh (left) with prince Mozaffar ad-Din Mirza, from the library of the Golestan Palace in Tehran

Tahmasp Mirza Moayyed od-Dowleh (Persian: تهماسب میرزا مؤیدالدوله) was a Qajar prince and governor in 19th-century Iran. He was the second son of Mohammad-Ali Mirza Dowlatshah and grandson of Fath-Ali Shah Qajar (r. 1797–1834).

After the death of his father in 1821, Tahmasp Mirza started working under his uncle, the Crown Prince Abbas Mirza. He was treated well by his uncle, and eventually married his daughter. In 1831, while Abbas Mirza was making military expeditions in Khorasan, Tahmasp Mirza supplied him with 4,000 troops from the Azerbaijan province. After Abbas Mirza's son Mohammad Shah Qajar became the new shah (king) of Iran in 1834, he appointed Tahmasp Mirza as the governor of the town of Kashan.

In 1835/36, Tahmasp Mirza was appointed as the governor of the Hamadan province. In 1848/49, he replaced Fazl Ali Khan Qarabaghi as the governor of the Kerman province under the orders of the prime minister Amir Kabir. During his three year governorship, Tahmasp Mirza worked to stabilize the disorganized province.

In 1851/52, Mohammad Hasan Khan Sardar succeeded him as the governor of Kerman, after which Tahmasp Mirza was unemployed until 1852/53, when he was re-appointed as the governor of Hamadan. In 1853, he succeeded his cousin Firuz Mirza as the governor of the Fars province. However, he did not make much progress during his term, and was in 1859 replaced by another cousin, Morad Mirza Hesam o-Saltaneh. Tahmasp Mirza held the governorship of Fars again between 1861–1863, being succeeded by Mass'oud Mirza Zell-e Soltan.

In 1871/72, Tahmasp Mirza was appointed as a member of the newly established council, which Naser al-Din Shah had formed after consulting with Mirza Hosein Khan Sepahsalar. In the same year, he was appointed as the governor of the Kermanshah province, thus succeeding his younger brother Emamqoli Mirza Emad od-Dowleh. In 1874/75, the Kurdistan province was incorporated into Kermanshah. Soon afterwards, Emamqoli Mirza waw re-appointed as the governor of Kermanshah.

In 1878, Tahmasp Mirza was appointed as the governor of the towns of Malayer, Nahavand, and Toyserkan. He died in 1879/80, and had a son named Lotf-Ali Mirza, who governed Savojbolagh.

== Sources ==
- Ashraf, Ahmad (1999). "Fārs iv. History in the Qajar and Pahlavi Periods". In Yarshater, Ehsan (ed.). Encyclopædia Iranica (Online ed.). Encyclopædia Iranica Foundation. ISBN 978-0710090959.
- Bamdad, Mehdi (1972). شرح حال رجال ایران در قرن ۱۲ و ۱۳ و ۱۴ هجری [Biographies of [notable] personages of Iran in the 18th, 19th, and 20th centuries, vol. 2].
