= Ashraf os-Saltaneh =

Iranian princess and photographer (1863–1914)

- عزت ملک‌ خانم
- Born: Ezzat Malek Khanom; 1863; Kermanshah, Sublime State of Iran
- Died: 1914 (aged 50–51); Mashhad, Sublime State of Iran
- Other names: Ashraf al-Saltaneh, Ashraf-os-Saltane, Ezzat al-Molk
- Occupation: Member of court
- Years active: 1887–1914
- Spouse(s): Mohammad Hasan Khan E'temad os-Saltaneh (1871–1896); Husayn Thabit (1901–1914)
- Father: Emamqoli Mirza Emad od-Dowleh

Ashraf os-Saltaneh (Persian: اشرف السلطنه; 1863–1914) was an Iranian princess and photographer of the Qajar era, known as one of the earliest women photographers and journalists in the period. After the death of her first husband, she preserved his daily journal, which she had helped write. It was published in 1966 and provides insight into court life and the personality of the monarch during the 19th century.

== Early life ==
Ezzat Malek Khanoum was born in Kermanshah, Iran in 1863. Her father was Emamqoli Mirza Emad od-Dowleh, a governor of western Iran, who was the son of Mohammad-Ali Mirza Dowlatshah. She was a great-granddaughter of Fath-Ali Shah Qajar, the second Qajar shah of Iran. In 1871, she became the second wife of Mohammad Hasan Khan E'temad os-Saltaneh and moved with him to Tehran. Her husband, was a high-ranking member of the court and served as the personal interpreter and translator for Naser al-Din Shah Qajar. After her husband received the title of E'temad os-Saltaneh in 1887, she was commonly known as Ashraf os-Saltaneh.

Ashraf os-Saltaneh had received a typical education for members of the royal harem learning cooking and sewing. She also studied history and medicine, forgoing the usual feminine subjects of poetry and music, and was accomplished at backgammon and chess. In addition, her husband taught her French and her brother Soltan Mohammad Mirza taught her photography. She was a friend of both the Shah and his most important wife Anis al-Dawla. Ashraf os-Saltaneh was haughty, proud and self-confident, and could be confrontational, even with members of the royal family. Her nephew, Yaman al-Dowleh, described her as a masculine woman, an atypical representative of her gender. Her ancestry provided her with connections in the Qajar harem, giving her access to court gossip and intrigue, information vitally important to her husband in navigating through political in-fighting, and power with which to intercede on behalf his behalf with the court. She became a trusted confidant and strategist for E'temad os-Saltaneh.

Because Ashraf os-Saltaneh could not have children, she tolerated her husband's relationships with prostitutes, servants and young boys, as long as no pregnancy resulted. Knowing that offspring might result in a reduction of her power by elevating a servant to a higher position in the household, she required that her husband detail all of his encounters to her. These were recorded in his diary and despite the fact that E'temad os-Saltaneh had fathered a child with his first wife, he repeatedly stated in the journal that he was impotent, in an attempt to appease his wife. In an era when women were separated from society and subordinate to their husbands, Ashraf os-Saltaneh's gender had minimal impact on her life, allowing her to act independently.

With photography, Ashraf os-Saltaneh was reported by her nephew Yaman al-Dowleh and E'temad os-Saltaneh to have taken beautiful photographs. At a time when the law forbade women and men from having any contact outside of the family, few photographs of women were made. With few exceptions, the photographs of female subjects tended to be made by foreign travelers and women of the court. Some of her photographs were made inside the court and she took a well-known photograph of Naser al-Din Shah. Other photographs made by her were included in the diary of her husband. Ashraf os-Saltaneh is widely recognized as the first woman photographer in Iran and was followed by her sisters Azra and Fatemeh, who also took photographs at court, and a Miss Haddad, who took pictures of the public in Shahpour Square.

E'temad os-Saltaneh kept detailed diaries of court life and Ashraf os-Saltaneh was one of the few people who had access to his private notes. From time to time, he dictated the day's events to her and she made the daily entries for him. Saiyed Farid Ghasemi, a noted historian of the Iranian press, named Ashraf os-Saltaneh as the first woman journalist of the country, as well as the first photographer after discovering nine articles she published in collaboration with E'temad os-Saltaneh, while her husband was serving as the press officer of Iran. When her husband died in April 1896, he left his papers to the Shah, but when Naser al-Din Shah Qajar was assassinated a month later, Ashraf os-Saltaneh asked for the diary to be returned to her. Ashraf os-Saltaneh remarried with her first cousin, Sayyid Husayn Arab (Thabit), and moved to Mashhad. In 1903, the new Shah, Mozaffar ad-Din Shah Qajar, returned the journal, which remained with Ashraf os-Saltaneh until her death.

== Death and legacy ==
Ashraf os-Saltaneh died in 1914 in Mashhad and was buried in the mausoleum at Dara al-Sidah. She willed the diary of her first husband to the Library of the Imam Reza shrine in Mashhad. In 1966, the diary was published giving information not only of the cultural and political life of Iran in the 19th century, but personal insights into "the life and personality of a ruler—Naser od-Din Shah". Eight years after she died a biography of her life was written by Soltan Ahmad Dowlatshāhi Yamin-od-Dowle.
