= Mohammad Hasan Khan E'temad os-Saltaneh =

Iranian statesman, scholar and author (1843–1896)

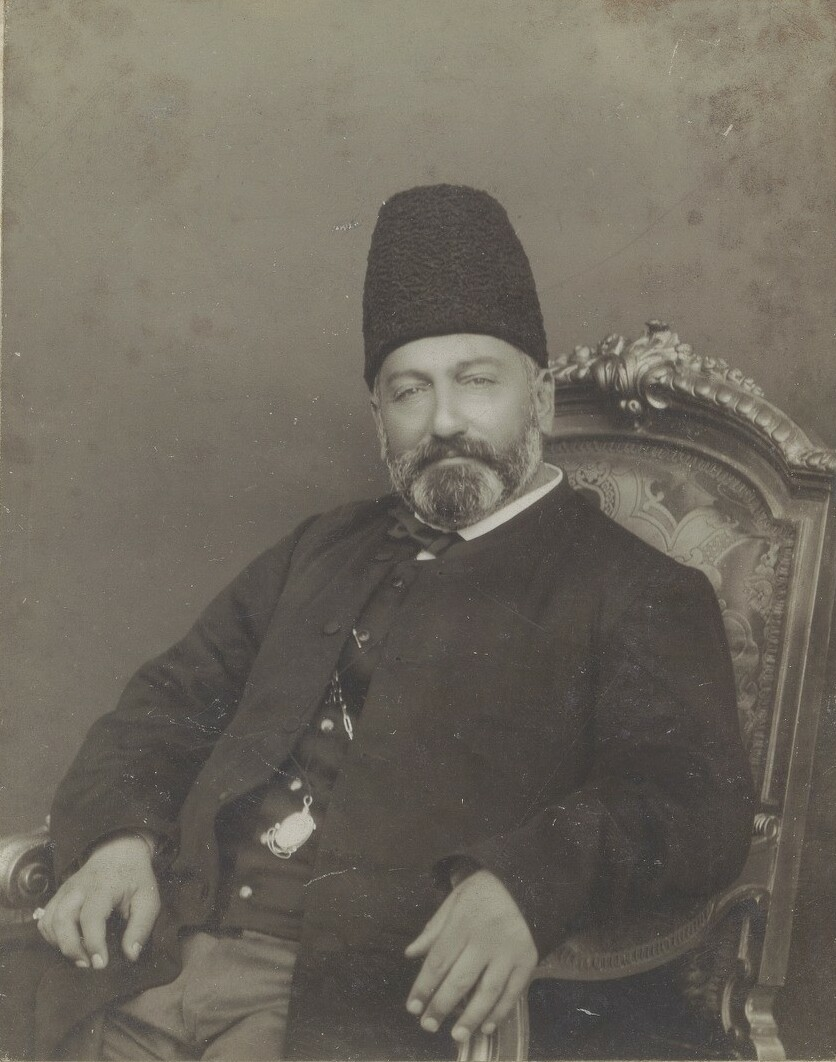
- Photograph of Mohammad Hasan Khan E'temad os-Saltaneh
- Born: 1843; Qajar Iran
- Died: 1896 (aged 52–53); Qajar Iran
- Occupations: Statesman, scholar, and author
- Spouse: Ashraf os-Saltaneh
- Relatives: Ali Khan Maragha'i (father)
- Writing career
- Language: Persian
- Notable work: Ruz-nama-ye khaterat-e E'temad-al-Saltana

Mohammad Hasan Khan E'temad os-Saltaneh (Persian: محمدحسن خان اعتماد السلطنه; 1843–1896) was an Iranian statesman, scholar, and author active during the reign of the Qajar shah (king) Naser al-Din Shah Qajar (r. 1848–1896).

He was the son of Ali Khan Maragha'i, a member of the Moqaddam tribe who served as the farrash-bashi (court minister) during the early reign of Naser al-Din Shah. His mother was from the Qajar dynasty. E'temad os-Saltaneh's secret notebook, entitled Ruz-nama-ye khaterat-e E'temad-al-Saltana, which spans over 17 years of his career, is considered his most significant work and one of the most important sources for the history of the late Qajar era.

E'temad os-Saltaneh, like many of the European-educated politicians of that era, supported a sort of "enlightened" monarchy that was committed to strong governance and advancement in technology but also took into account the interests of the traditional nobility. Like his attempts to teach Naser al-Din Shah good French, E'temad os-Saltaneh's attempts to politically educate Naser al-Din Shah were often ineffective. Frequently, he expressed his dissatisfaction that Naser al-Din Shah was more preoccupied with the dramatic and enjoyable elements of European media and publications than with their important historical and ethical worth.

== Bibliography ==
A selection of works written by E'temad os-Saltaneh:

- Tarikh-e Montazam-e Naseri
- Mir'at al-Buldan
- Mir'at al-Asar
- History of Tabarestan
- Matla'e Shams
- Khayrat-é Hésan

== Sources ==
- Amanat, Abbas (1997). Pivot of the Universe: Nasir Al-Din Shah Qajar and the Iranian Monarchy, 1831-1896. I.B.Tauris. ISBN 978-1845118280.
- Amanat, Abbas (1998). "Eʿtemād-al-Salṭana Moḥammad-Ḥasan Khan Moqaddam Marāḡaʾī". In Yarshater, Ehsan (ed.). Encyclopædia Iranica. Vol. VIII/6: Eršād al-zerāʿa–Eʿteżād-al-Salṭana. London and New York: Routledge & Kegan Paul. pp. 662–666. ISBN 978-1-56859-055-4.
- Kia, Mehrdad (2001). "Inside the Court of Naser od-Din Shah Qajar, 1881-96: The Life and Diary of Mohammad Hasan Khan E'temad os-Saltaneh". Middle Eastern Studies. 37. Taylor & Francis: 101–141. JSTOR 4284141. (registration required)
- Kondo, Nobuaki (2019). "How to Found a New Dynasty: The Early Qajars' Quest for Legitimacy". Journal of Persianate Studies. 12 (2): 261–287. doi:10.1163/18747167-12341336. S2CID 214128812.
