= Husayn Thabit =

Iranian politician (c. 1860–1917)

Sayyid Husayn Nayeb o-tolieh
- Born: Husayn Saeed Sultan Al Thabit c. 1860; Karbala, Ottoman Iraq
- Died: 1917 (aged 56–57); Mashhad, Qajar Iran
- Resting place: Imam Reza shrine
- Spouse: 3 or 4, including Ashraf os-Saltaneh
- Children: 8
- Writing career
- Language: Persian
- Notable work: Ruz-nama-ye Nayeb o-tolieh

Sayyid Husayn Al Thabit (Arabic: حسين آل ثابت; c. 1860–1917), also known as Husayn Nayeb o-tolieh (Persian: حسين نايب التوليه) or Husayn Arab (Persian: حسين عرب), was an Iraqi-Iranian nobleman, writer, statesman, and custodian of the Abbas shrine, as well as deputy custodian of the Imam Reza shrine.

== Early life ==
Thabit was born to a noble father, and a royal mother. His father, Saeed Thabit, was the custodian of the Abbas shrine, and hailed from the noble family of Al Thabit (A branch from the Al Zuhayk family), one of the oldest Alid families of Karbala, which claim descent from the seventh Shia Imam, Musa al-Kazim. His mother was a Qajar princess, and a granddaughter of Fath-Ali Shah Qajar.

== Biography ==
Thabit's father died in c. 1868, whilst he was still young. This left the Abbas shrine custodianship vacant. The Ottoman government were not keen on keeping Thabit, since he descended from Iranian royalty, and Ottomans did not want someone with such family ties to hold such an influential and important role.

They lobbied for the introduction of Husayn Dhiya al-Din (d. 1872), a nobleman from the Dhiya al-Din family to act as regent custodian, until Thabit came of age. By 1870, a firman was issued dubbing Dhiya al-Din as the custodian of the Abbas shrine, rather than regent. By the time Thabit came of age, the Dhiya al-Din family had taken over the custodianship of the shrine, and this matter upset Thabit, leading him to him to go to the Sublime Porte to try and regain his right, but to no avail. Naser al-Din Shah Qajar heard of his cousin's unfortunate situation, and so ordered his ambassador, Mo'in ol-Mulk to bring Thabit along with him when returning to Iran.

Thabit migrated to Iran in 1885, and was sent to Mashhad to become the deputy custodian of the Imam Reza shrine, during the reign of Asif al-Dola.

He returned to Karbala in 1901 for the first time since he left in 1885.

== Personal life ==
Whilst in Iran, during the late Qajar era, when family names were adopted, he used his family name Thabit, but due to pronunciations in the Persian language, it was rendered Sabeti.

Thabit married a number of times. One of his wives was his cousin, from his father's side, another was Ashraf os-Saltaneh, a cousin from his mother's side, and other women. His son, Ali Moayed Sabeti (1903–2000), was a former senator, industrialist, and poet, whilst his son, Hasan Sabeti was the Iranian ambassador to Yemen (North) in the 1970s. His grandson, Masood, married Marziyah Khanum, the daughter of Husayn Quli Mirza Nusrat al-Saltanah.

== Death ==
In 1917, Thabit died in Mashhad and was buried in the Imam Reza shrine.
