= Mohammad-Ali Mirza Dowlatshah =

Iranian prince (1789–1821)

Mohammad-Ali Mirza محمدعلی ‌میرزا
- Dowlatshah
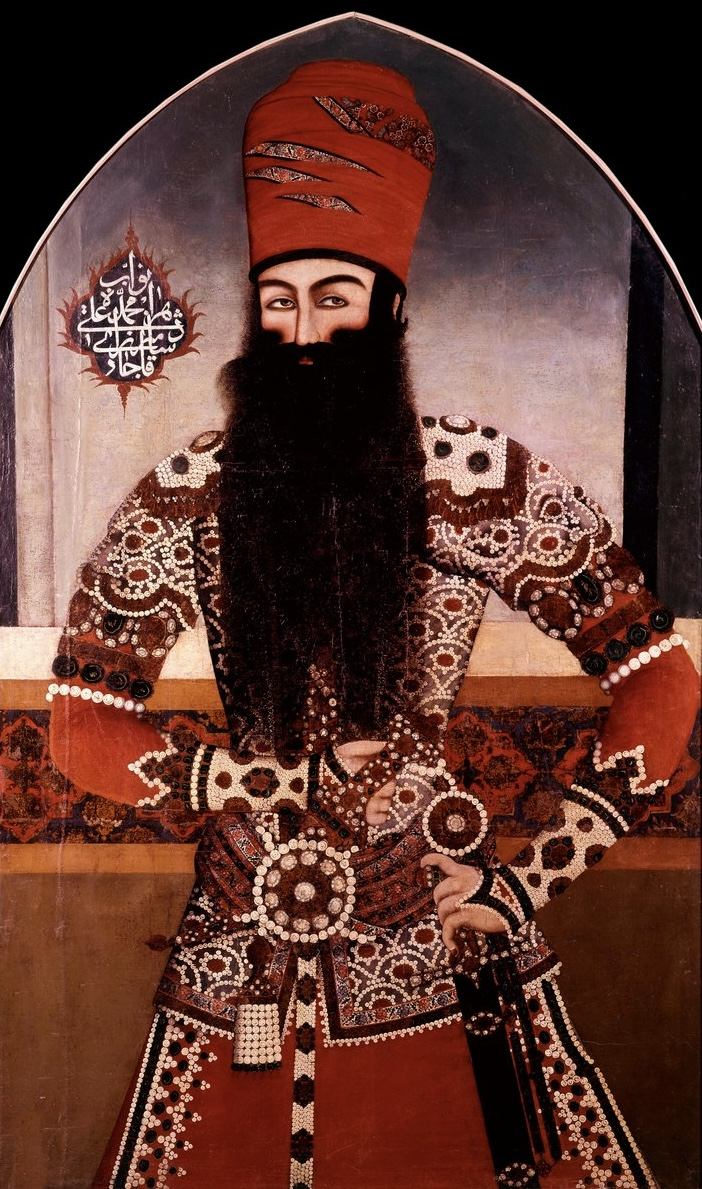
- Portrait of Mohammad-Ali Mirza Dowlatshah, Qajar Iran, Anonymous painter, dated before 1821.

Governor of Fars
- Tenure: 1797–1799
- Predecessor: Hossein Qoli Khan Qajar
- Successor: Hossein Ali Mirza

Governor of Gilan and Qazvin
- Tenure: 1799–1804
- Predecessor: Morteza Qoli Khan Qajar
- Successor: Mirza Musa Khan Monajjembashi

Governor of Khuzestan and Lorestan
- Tenure: 1804–1807

Governor of Kermanshah
- Tenure: 1807–1821
- Predecessor: Fath-Ali Khan Qajar
- Successor: Mohammad-Hossein Mirza
- Born: Mohammad Ali Mirza (محمدعلی میرزا); 5 January 1789; Nava, Mazandaran
- Died: 22 November 1821 (aged 32); Taq-e Gara, Kermanshah province
- Issue Among others: Mohammad-Hossein Mirza; Tahmasp Mirza Moayyed od-Dowleh; Emamqoli Mirza Emad od-Dowleh
- Dynasty: Qajar
- Father: Fath-Ali Shah Qajar
- Mother: Ziba Chehr Khanoum
- Religion: Shia Islam

Mohammad-Ali Mirza Dowlatshah (Persian: محمدعلی‌میرزا دولتشاه; 5 January 1789, in Nava – 22 November 1821, in Ctesiphon) was an Iranian Prince of the Qajar dynasty. He is also the progenitor of the Dowlatshahi family. He was born at Nava, in Mazandaran, a Caspian province in northern Iran. He was the first son of Fath-Ali Shah, the second Qajar shah of Iran, and Ziba-Chehr Khanum, a Georgian girl of the Tsikarashvili (also spelled Tzicara Chwili) family. He was also the elder brother (by seven months) of Abbas Mirza. Dowlatshah was the governor of Fars at age 9, Qazvin and Gilan at age 11, Khuzestan and Lorestan at age 16, and Kermanshah at age 19.

In the wars against Russia, he crushed the Russians in Yerevan and Tbilisi. Dowlatshah developed the city of Kermanshah and founded Dowlat-Abad, which was later renamed Malayer.

Dowlatshah had 10 sons. His descendants live in various countries around the world and carry the surname: in Persian: دولتشاهی, romanized: Doulatšâhi, which is rendered as Dowlatshahi in English, Doulatchahi in French and Doulatszahi in Polish, etc.

== Biography ==
=== Early life ===
Dowlatshah was born on 5 January 1789 in the village of Nava in Mazandaran, northern Iran. He was the eldest son of Fath-Ali Shah Qajar (r. 1797–1834), the second Qajar shah (king) of Iran and part of the Qovanlu branch of the Qajar tribe. His mother was Ziba-Chehr Khanum, a Georgian slave girl from the Tsikarashvili family. Despite being the oldest, Dowlatshah was excluded from the succession since the law of the Qajar tribe required that the chieftain of the tribe (as well as the crown prince) had to have Qajar parents. Instead, it was planned that the succession would pass to his seven-month younger brother Abbas Mirza, due to his mother belonging to the Davanlu clan of the Qajars. This choice has been made by Fath-Ali Shah's uncle Agha Mohammad Khan Qajar (r. 1789–1797), who wanted to unite the Qovanlu and Davanlu.

Agha Mohammad Khan also appears to have taken the personalities of both princes into account when choosing Abbas Mirza over Dowlatshah. These two princes had opposite personalities, attitudes, and physiques. Abbas Mirza was frail, bashful and humble in comparison to Dowlatshah's robust body, brave and fearless personality, and impolite and brash manners. Dowlatshah therefore consistently had the advantage in their fights when growing up. Agha Mohammad Khan first developed a strong affection for Dowlatshah because of this particular characteristic and the similarities in their personalities. Agha Mohammad Khan spent a lot of time with both of them attempting to impart his expertise and experience. He eventually discovered that his efforts with Dowlatshah were futile after observing his agitated, hostile, and daring personality through a series of tests. Agha Mohammad Khan thus made the decision to increasingly concentrate his attention on Abbas Mirza.

Fath-Ali Shah appointed Dowlatshah to rule and protect the boundaries of the two Iraqs (a name given to western states of Iran) and also adjoined Khuzestan province to his territories. In fact, during Dowlatshah's time, Kermanshah had become a citadel against the Ottomans.

Dowlatshah carried out the last, and initially very successful, attack on Ottoman Iraq in 1821. Iran was resentful of the inability of the Ottoman government to protect the Shia population of Iraq against the Wahhabi attacks that had begun in 1801. Many of the Shias killed in the raids were Iranians, some of whom closely related to the ruling Qajar dynasty of Iran. His forces quickly occupied Shahrazur and Kirkuk, and laid siege to Baghdad.

His skills and ambitions mirrored those of his younger brother. He was a great military leader and a patron of the arts, poetry and philosophy. The origin of the family names "Dowlatshah," "Dowlatshahi," and close variations such as "Dolatshahi" are from this ancestor's title.

Dowlatshah has been greatly respected among the people of Kermanshah (Persians, Kurds, Lors and Laks), mainly because of his contributions such as Dowlatshah mosque (مسجد دولتشاه) His mosque is located in the Javanshir Square of Kermanshah and was built in the years 1820–1822 AD. In recent years this mosque has been repaired. It consists of separate nocturnal areas along with a courtyard.

=== Governor of Kermanshah ===
The city of Kermanshah is located in the center of the province and has a temperate climate. It is one of the ancient cities of Iran and it is said that Tahmores Divband, a mythical ruler of the Pishdadian, had constructed it. Some attribute its constructions to Bahram Sassanid. During the reigns of Qobad I and Anushirvan Sassanid, Kermanshah was at the peak of its glory. But in the Arab attack suffered great damage. Concurrent with the Afghan attack and the fall of Esfahan, Kermanshah was destroyed due to the Ottoman invasion. But from the beginning of the 11th century AH it began to flourish.

In order to prevent a probable aggression of the Zangeneh tribe and due to its proximity with the Ottoman Empire, the Safavid rulers paid great attention to this city. In the Zand era upheavals increased, whereas during the Qajar era, Ottoman attacks reduced. Mohammad Ali Mirza in 1221 AH was seated in Kermanshah in order to prevent Ottoman aggression, and Khuzestan also came under his realm. An epigraph of Mohammad Ali Mirza in Taq-e-Bostan has remained as a relic.

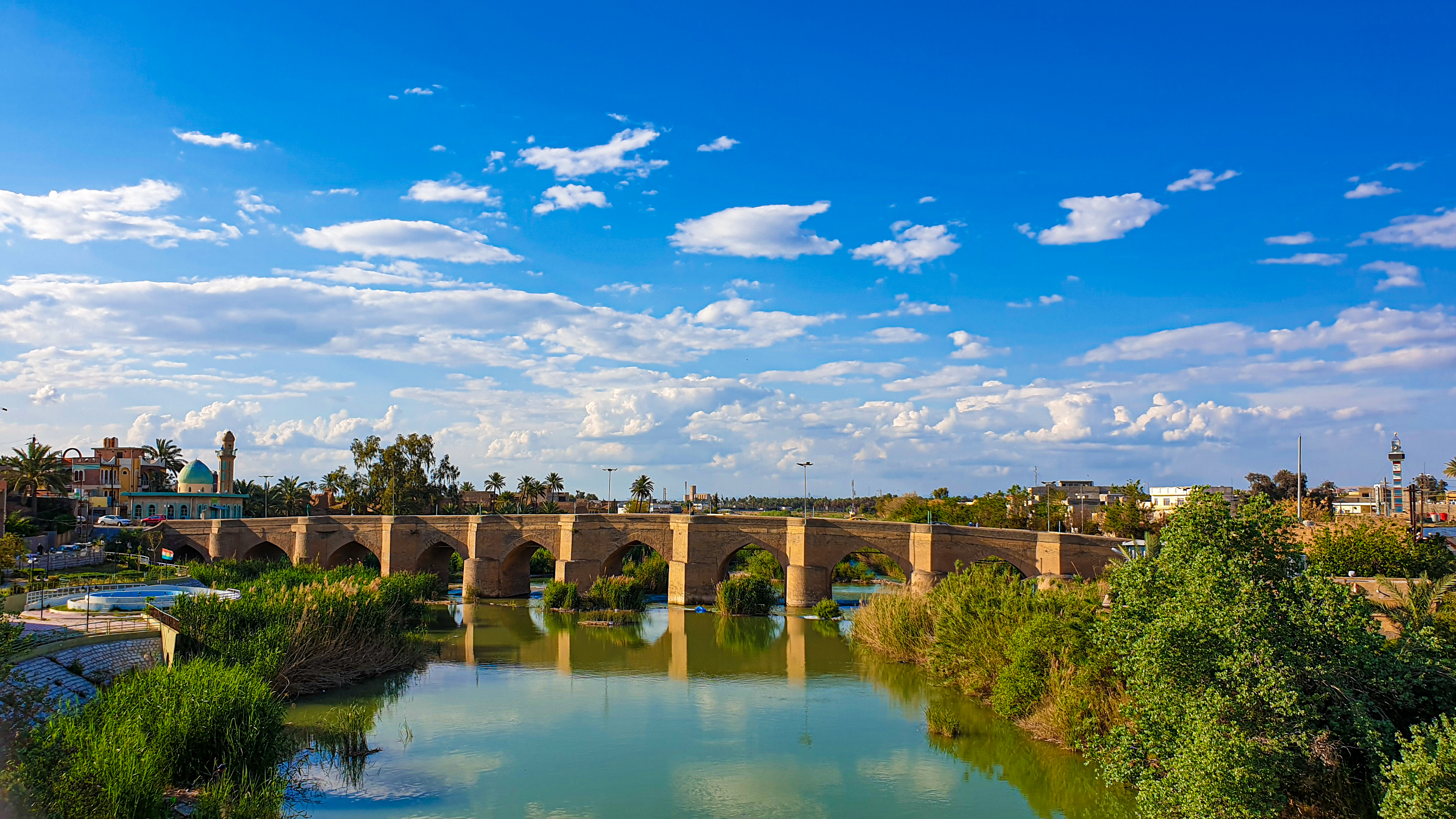
Alwand Bridge in Khanaqin

The famous Alwand Bridge on the Alwand River was built by him when he went to Khanaqin in 1855 on his way to visit the Shia holy sites in Karbala and Najaf, but that year Khanaqin faced a severe flood and he decided to spend his travel expenses in addition to the additional costs of building a bridge in Khanaqin. He brought a number of architects from Isfahan to Khanaqin and the bridge was built using walnut wood imported from Kermanshah. The bridge was completed in 1860.

=== Turkish-Persian War (1820–1823) ===
The regime of Crown Prince Abbas Mirza launched an attack on the Ottoman Empire, placing the Iranian army under the leadership of Mohammad Ali Mirza Dowlatshah. The war was sparked by the Ottoman inability to protect the Shia population of Ottoman Iraq from Wahhabi attacks. A large number of Shias had fled from Ottoman Iraq and were given refuge by the Qajars. The war opened with a Persian invasion of Turkey in the Lake Van region, and a counter-invasion by the Ottoman Pasha of Baghdad (as Iraq belonged to the Ottoman Empire), who invaded western Persia. This invasion force was driven back across the border, but Dowlatshah's newly modernised army of 30,000 troops defeated 50,000 Ottoman troops in the Battle of Erzurum near Lake Van in 1821. Dowlatshah then led the Iranian army south and besieged the city of Baghdad, but Dawud Pasha successfully defended the city, and with the impact of a cholera outbreak, Dowlatshah was defeated. A peace treaty in 1823 ended the war with no changes to their mutual border.

=== Death and burial ===
On his way back to Kermanshah after besieging Baghdad, Mohammad Ali Mirza Dowlatshah was infected with what is presumed to have been cholera in Taq-e Gara and died there.

He is buried in the shrine of Imam Husayn in Karbala.

== Offspring ==
Mohammad Ali Mirza Dowlatshah had 12 daughters and 10 sons.

=== Sons ===
- Prince Mohammad-Hossein Mirza (1808–1835), governor of Kermanshah from 1821 to 1834
- Prince Tahmasp Mirza (1809–1879/1880)
- Prince Nasrollah Mirza Vali
- Prince Assadollah Mirza
- Prince Fathollah Mirza
- Prince Emamqoli Mirza Emad od-Dowleh (1814–1875), governor of Kermanshah from 1834 to 1875.
- Prince Nour-ol-Dahr Mirza
- Prince Jahangir Mirza
- Prince Mohammad Rahim Mirza
- Prince Abol Hossein Mirza

== Government positions held ==
- Governor of Fars 1797–1799
- Governor of Gilan and Qazvin 1799–1804
- Governor of Khuzestan and Lorestan 1804–1807
- Governor of Kermanshah 1807–1821

== Sources ==
- Amanat, Abbas (1994). "Dawlatšāh, Moḥammad-ʿAlī Mīrzā". In Yarshater, Ehsan (ed.). Encyclopædia Iranica. Vol. VII/2: Dastūr al-Afāżel–Dehqān I. London and New York: Routledge & Kegan Paul. pp. 147–149. ISBN 978-1-56859-020-2.
- Amanat, Abbas (1999). "Fatḥ-ʿAlī Shah Qājār". In Yarshater, Ehsan (ed.). Encyclopædia Iranica. Vol. IX/4: Fārs II–Fauna III. London and New York: Routledge & Kegan Paul. pp. 407–421. ISBN 978-0-933273-32-0.
- Amanat, Abbas (2017). Iran: A Modern History. Yale University Press. ISBN 978-0-300-11254-2.
- Busse, H. (1982). "ʿAbbās Mīrzā Qajar". In Yarshater, Ehsan (ed.). Encyclopædia Iranica. Vol. I/1: Āb–ʿAbd-al-Hamīd. London and New York: Routledge & Kegan Paul. pp. 79–84. ISBN 978-0-71009-090-4.
- Hambly, Gavin R. G. (1991). "Āghā Muhammad Khān and the establishment of the Qājār dynasty". In Avery, Peter; Hambly, Gavin R. G.; Melville, Charles Peter (eds.). The Cambridge History of Iran: From Nadir Shah to the Islamic Republic. Vol. 7. Cambridge: Cambridge University Press. pp. 104–143. ISBN 0-521-20095-4.
- Hambly, Gavin R. G. (1991). "Iran during the reigns of Fath 'Alī Shāh and Muhammad Shāh". In Avery, Peter; Hambly, Gavin R. G.; Melville, Charles Peter (eds.). The Cambridge History of Iran: From Nadir Shah to the Islamic Republic. Vol. 7. Cambridge: Cambridge University Press. pp. 144–173. ISBN 0-521-20095-4.
- Lahouti, Hassan (2015). "ʿAbbās Mīrzā". In Madelung, Wilferd; Daftary, Farhad (eds.). Encyclopaedia Islamica Online. Brill Online. ISSN 1875-9831.
- Shahvar, Soli (2020a). "Domestic and external considerations in the struggle over regency in early Qajar Iran: The princely rivalry between ʿAbbas Mirza and Muhammad-ʿAli Mirza". Middle Eastern Studies. 56 (4): 549–569. doi:10.1080/00263206.2020.1751617. S2CID 219927274.
- Shahvar, Soli (2020b). "Abbas Mirza's Invitation to Europeans to Settle in Nineteenth-Century Iranian Azerbaijan: Reasons, Causes and Motives". Iran: Journal of the British Institute of Persian Studies. 60: 121–134. doi:10.1080/05786967.2020.1749009. S2CID 216249898.
- Werner, Christoph (2012). "ʿAbbās Mīrzā". In Fleet, Kate; Krämer, Gudrun; Matringe, Denis; Nawas, John; Rowson, Everett (eds.). Encyclopaedia of Islam (3rd ed.). Brill Online. ISSN 1873-9830.
