= Tarikh-e Montazam-e Naseri =

1880–1882 book by Mohammad Hasan Khan E'temad os-Saltaneh

Tārikh-e Montazam-e Naseri (Persian: تاریخ منتظم ناصری, lit. 'The Naseri Chronological History') is a historical book written in Persian by Mohammad Hasan Khan E'temad os-Saltaneh, who served as the translator and head of the royal printing house and translation bureau under Naser al-Din Shah Qajar.

The work was composed between 1880 and 1882 (1298 and 1300 AH) and presented to the Shah of Iran. It covers the general history of the world from the Hijrah of the Prophet Muhammad to the beginning of the Qajar era. The author organises his historical accounts geographically, covering Asia, Europe, Africa, and Americas, which made the book unique in its approach.

The name of the book reflects its ordered chronological structure (Tarikh-e Montazam; lit. Chronological History) and its dedication to Naser al-Din Shah (Naseri).

== Background ==
The delay in writing the fifth volume of Mir'at al-Buldan (Persian: مرآة البُلْدَان) due to a lack of accurate information on some cities and villages, was one of the reasons for the composition of Tārikh-e Montazam-e Naseri. Moreover, there was no comprehensive book in Persian on the general history of Iran and the world that went beyond merely recounting the reigns of monarchs and their wars. This book includes various events such as the birth and death of scholars and notables, inventions, public diseases, and even certain eclipses.

== Structure ==
The work is organized in two sections and three volumes, offering a comparative timeline of Hijri and Gregorian calendars. This book was also one of the first efforts to synchronize the calendars comprehensively in Persian.

Each report in the Tārikh-e Montazam-e Naseri is marked with both its Hijri and Gregorian dates. The author has summarized the reports and, whenever an event previously discussed is mentioned again, directs the reader back to that earlier point in the text. Following the date, the reports are also organised by geographical regions (e.g., Asia, Europe, etc.), which facilitates reading and understanding the context. Even smaller geographical subdivisions are mentioned after the name of the continent and before the main report, such as "Europe-England" or "Europe-Russia."

Also at the end of each volume, a calendar of the corresponding year is printed, followed by a table of Qajar shahs, listing their birth and death years and reign durations. Additionally, the book provides detailed accounts of royal family members, tribal leaders, military officials, and government offices.

=== Three volumes ===
- The first volume covers the history of the Islamic world from the Hijra (622 CE) to the fall of the Abbasid Caliphate in 656 AH. It then discusses the Mongol invasion under Hulegu Khan and traces events up to the author's time.
- The second volume ends with the events of 1193 AH (the year of Karim Khan Zand's death), covering the period from the Mongol invasion to Karim Khan Zand's time.
- The third volume focuses on the Qajar dynasty, covering its history from the rise of Agha Mohammad Khan Qajar until 1300 AH. Notably, the author avoids discussing prominent figures such as Mirza Taqi Khan Amir Kabir, which has drawn criticism.

The first volume draws heavily on Ibn Athir’s al-Kamil fi al-Tarikh and other sources such as the works of Abulfeda and Ibn Khallikan's Wafayat al-Ayan.

The second and third volumes rely on works like Tarikh-e Moghol Nasavi, Matla‘ al-Sa‘dayn, Habib al-Siyar, Ahsan al-Tawarikh, and Nasikh al-Tawarikh.

== Historical errors ==
The book contains some historical errors that critics have noted. For instance, there are mistakes in the identification of some figures and places due to inaccuracies in the manuscript sources. The author occasionally points out discrepancies among historians, such as differences in the date of Agha Mohammad Shah Qajar's assassination.

The book's inclusion of unique works like the Afghan History by Sheikh Abd al-Nabi Munshi Behbahani and the Ibrat Nama by a European traveler adds to its value.

== Sources ==
- Kasravi, Ahmad (1973), Kasravi's Collection, Tehran, printed by Yahya Zaka.
- Aqa Bozorg Tehrani, Al-Dhari'a ila Tasaneef al-Shi'a.
- Mohammad Hassan ibn Ali Etemad al-Saltaneh, Tārikh-e Montazam-e Naseri, edited by Mohammad Esmaeil Rezvani, Tehran, 1984–1988.
- Farid Qasemi, Famous Figures of Iranian Press, Vol. 1, Mohammad Hassan Etemad al-Saltaneh, Tehran, 2000.
