= Bahram Mirza =

Prince of Qajar Iran (died 1882)

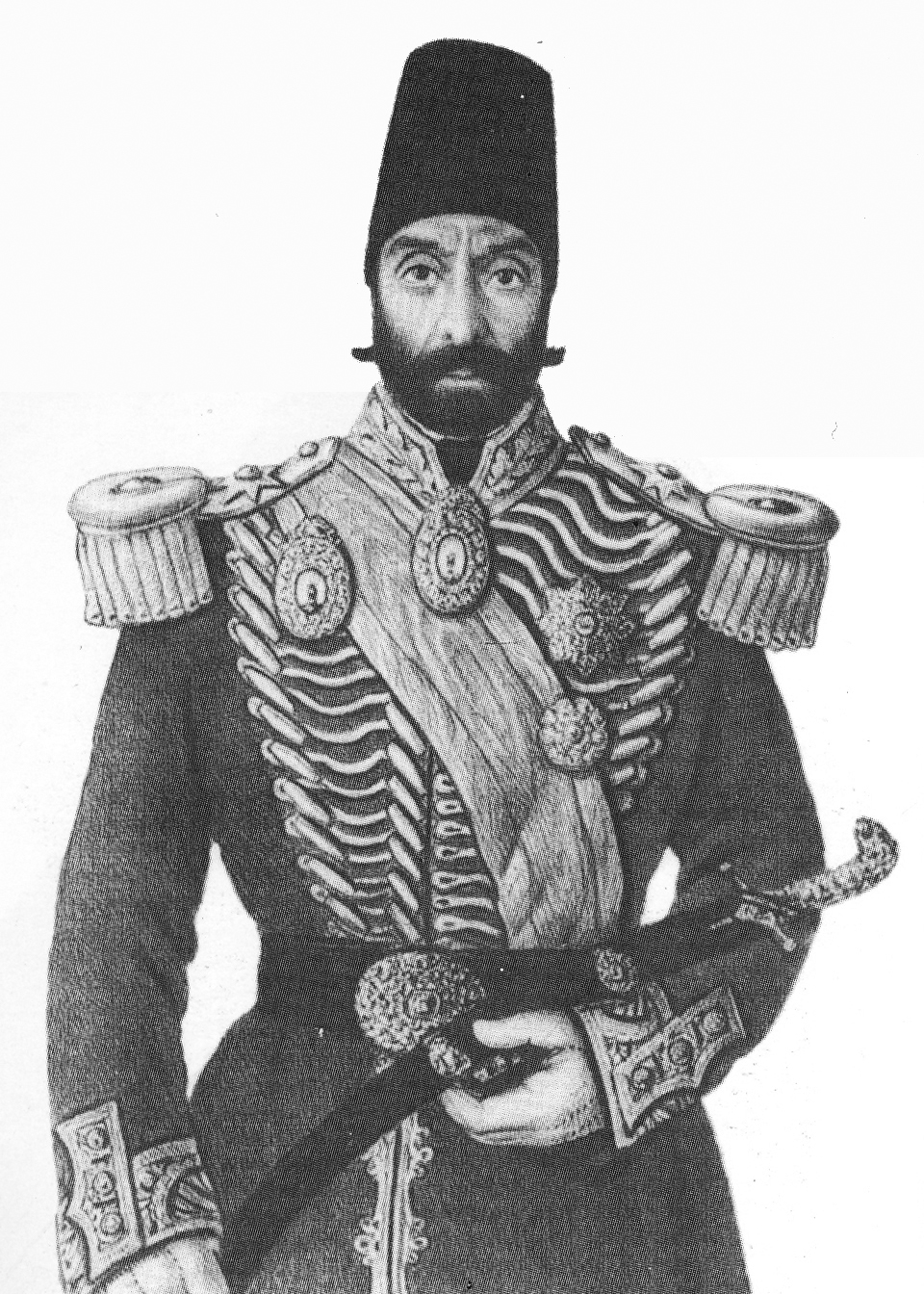
- Portrait of Bahram Mirza by Abu'l-Hasan Sani al-Mulk
- Died: 21 October 1882
- Burial: Shah Abdol-Azim Shrine, Ray
- Issue: Unnamed daughter
- Dynasty: Qajar
- Father: Abbas Mirza
- Religion: Twelver Shia Islam
- Writing career
- Language: Persian
- Notable works: Nezam-e naseri

Bahram Mirza Moezz-od-Dowleh (Persian: بهرام میرزا معزالدوله) was a Qajar prince, statesman and governor in 19th-century Iran. The second son of the crown prince Abbas Mirza, he served as the Minister of Justice from 1878 until his death on 21 October 1882.

Bahram Mirza first started working for the government in 1828, when he briefly governed Khoy. After the death of his grandfather and sovereign Fath-Ali Shah Qajar (r. 1797–1834) on 24 October 1834, a dynastic struggle for the throne erupted. Bahram Mirza helped his elder brother Mohammad Shah Qajar (r. 1834–1848) defeat some of the rebel princes and was made the governor of Kermanshah, Khuzestan, and Lorestan, the latter of which he assigned to his brother Farhad Mirza.

With the assistance of British military advisor Henry Rawlinson, Bahram Mirza led an expedition to confront the disobedient Bakhtiari Chahar Lang tribe, which ended in a truce. Bahram Mirza's tenure ceased soon afterward due to grievances from its residents, and he subsequently held other posts, including governor of Azerbaijan (1858–1860) and chief of the military council (1865–1868). During this period, he composed the military drill manual of Nezam-e naseri. His final post was as the Minister of Justice from 1878 to 1882.

== Name ==
"Bahram" is a New Persian name that originally meant "smiting of resistance", and is derived from Middle Persian Warahrān. In the Qajar era, a person of aristocratic or prestigious origin was represented by the title Mirza. Princes bore the title at the end of their name.

== Biography ==
=== Background and early career ===
A member of the ruling Qajar dynasty of Iran, Bahram Mirza was the second son of the crown prince Abbas Mirza and grandson of the shah (king) Fath-Ali Shah Qajar (r. 1797–1834). Bahram Mirza first started working for the government in 1828, when he was given the governorship of Khoy, with Mirza Mohammad Qavam al-Dawla serving as his minister. The same year, the city was besieged by the Russian Empire. Abbas Mirza evacuated Bahram Mirza and brought Amir Aslan Khan Donboli in his place. After the death of Abbas Mirza in 1834, his eldest son Mohammad Mirza was appointed the new crown prince. Bahram Mirza was in the company of Mohammad Mirza when Fath-Ali Shah died on 24 October 1834, which sparked schemes and a dynastic struggle over the throne.

=== Governorship of Kermanshah and Khuzestan ===
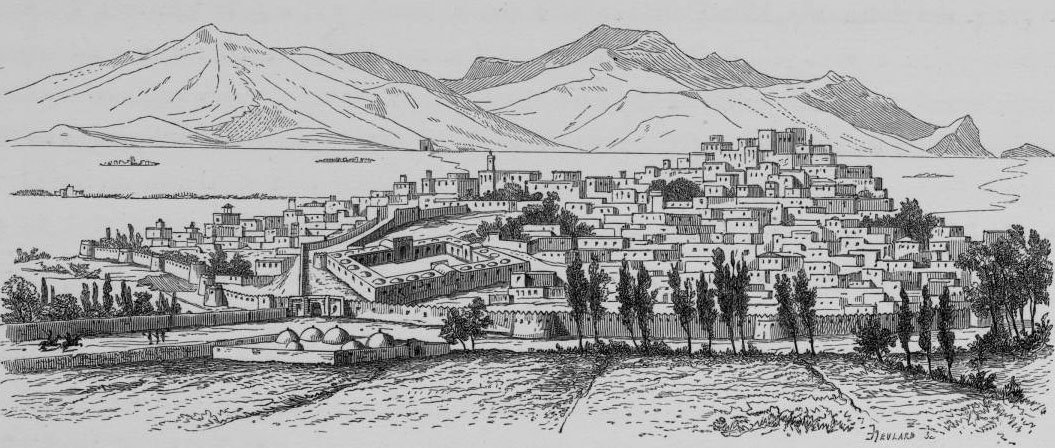
Illustration of Kermanshah, made by Eugène Flandin and Pascal Coste in 1840

Under the orders of the newly ascended Mohammad Mirza (crowned as Mohammad Shah Qajar), Bahram Mirza was appointed the governor of the southwestern region (Kermanshah, Khuzestan and Lorestan), which he successfully wrested from the rebellious brother princes Mohammad-Hossein Mirza, Asadollah Mirza and Nasrollah Mirza. Mohammad-Hossein Mirza, attempting to avoid Bahram Mirza, took an alternate route to the capital of Tehran, but was soon captured and sent to imprisonment in Ardabil. Asadollah Mirza and Nasrollah Mirza shared the same fate as him and were sent to Tehran. Bahram Mirza subsequently appointed his brother Farhad Mirza as the governor of Lorestan. In April 1835, Mohammad Shah sent the British military adviser Henry Rawlinson to Kermanshah to serve "as a sort of military adviser and assistant" to Bahram Mirza.

In the spring of 1837, Bahram Mirza was ordered by Mohammad Shah to launch a military expedition to Mungasht, the fortress of the disobedient Bakhtiari Chahar Lang tribe led by Mohammad Taqi Khan Bakhtiari. Bahram Mirza was joined by Henry Rawlinson, who had trained a Kurdish regiment for the shah. Six cannons and five thousand cavalry and infantry troops made up the military expedition. After the celebration of Nowruz (Iranian new year), the Qajar and Chahar Lang forces clashed on the Malamir plain near the banks of the Karun River. With neither of the forces managing to emerge victorious, a truce was made.

The contemporary historian Mohammad Taqi Sepehr reported that following the truce, Rawlinson was permitted to choose a thousand Bakhtiari tribesmen to be added to the Iranian elite regiment Nezam-e Jadid. Escorted by Rawlinson and 5,000 soldiers, Bahram Mirza met with Mohammad Taqi Khan at Mungasht, where he gifted him a jeweled sword and a robe of honor (khilat). Mohammad Taqi Khan promised that the Bakhtiari would stop avoiding their yearly taxes and fight for the shah if needed. As a sign of his compliance, he sent his brother Ali Naqi Khan to live in Kermanshah. However, in reality, the Chahar Lang would first start paying their yearly taxes during the 1840s, as a result of the harsh measures by the new governor, Manuchehr Khan Gorji.

=== Later career and death ===
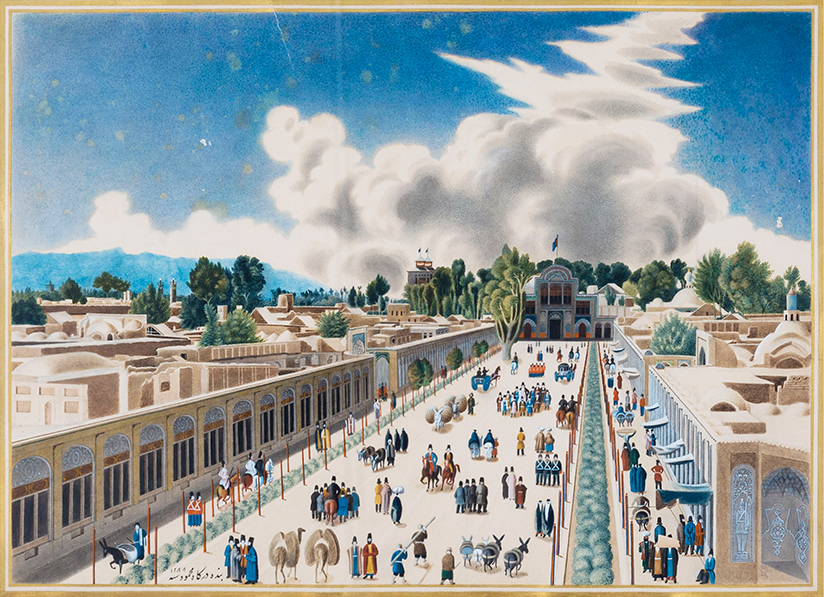
Illustration of Tehran, made by Mahmud Khan Malek al-Sho'ara in 1871

Bahram Mirza was soon called back to Tehran due the grievances expressed by the residents of Kermanshah. In December 1848, he was appointed the governor of Fars, thus replacing Hossein Khan Ajudanbashi. During his tenure, the government began to progressively widen its power to include parts of the south (such as Bushehr), started to actively push for taxes, and was able to keep enlarging certain aspects of their bureaucratic administration. He was replaced in January 1849. In 1850, during the visit to Isfahan by Naser al-Din Shah Qajar (r. 1848–1896) and his prime minister Amir Kabir, Bahram Mirza was named deputy governor of Tehran. In the same year, Bahram Mirza composed the military drill manual of Nezam-e naseri ("the army under Naser al-Din Shah" or "the victorious army"), which had 400 copies published in Tehran. It was praised as "well done and carefully written" by the Iranian government's official gazette, Vaqaye-e Ettefaqiyeh.

In 1858, Bahram Mirza was given the governorship of Azerbaijan and the title of "Moezz-od-Dowleh". However, he was only its titular governor, as he had given his pishkar (general manager) Aziz Khan Mokri complete control of its administration. In 1860, the governorship of the province was instead given to the crown prince Mozaffar ad-Din Mirza. Bahram Mirza was summoned to Tehran, where he served as the chief of the military council from 1865 to 1868. Mirza Mohammad Khan Sepahsalar had established this council to look into military personnel promotions and to propose new regulations. From 1865 to 1869, Bahram Mirza served as the governor of Khuzestan and Lorestan. He briefly held the governorship of Mazandaran from 1873 to 1874, being subsequently re-appointed as the governor of Khuzestan and Lorestan. In 1878, he was appointed as the Minister of Justice. He died on 21 October 1882 from a heart attack, and was buried in the Shah Abdol-Azim Shrine in Ray. He had a daughter who was married to the Twelver Shia jurist Mirza Abutaleb Zanjani.

== Legacy and assessment ==
Bahram Mirza is given very little attention in Nader Mirza's biography of the governors of Azerbaijan, which suggests that outside from serving as a soldier, he had no real interests. The social well-being of the individuals under his authority does not appear to have occurred to him. His shifting provincial governorship assignments are indicative of his uncompromising wealth accumulation strategies, which in turn infuriated the populace and led to his removal.

== Sources ==
- Busse, H. (1982). "ʿAbbās Mīrzā Qajar". In Yarshater, Ehsan (ed.). Encyclopædia Iranica. Vol. I/1: Āb–ʿAbd-al-Hamīd. London and New York: Routledge & Kegan Paul. pp. 79–84. ISBN 978-0-71009-090-4.
- Calmard, Jean (1988). "ʿAzīz Khan Mokrī". In Yarshater, Ehsan (ed.). Encyclopædia Iranica. Vol. III/3: Azerbaijan IV–Bačča(-ye) Saqqā. London and New York: Routledge & Kegan Paul. pp. 261–263. ISBN 978-0-71009-115-4.
- Calmard, Jean (2004). "Moḥammad Shah Qājār". In Yarshater, Ehsan (ed.). Encyclopædia Iranica (Online ed.). Encyclopædia Iranica Foundation.
- Davies, Charles Edward (1987). "Qajar Rule in Fars Prior to 1849". Iran. 25: 125–153. doi:10.2307/4299789. ISSN 0578-6967. JSTOR 4299789. OCLC 819189725.
- Ebrahimnejad, Hormoz (2004). Medicine, Public Health, and the Qājār State: Patterns of Medical Modernization in Nineteenth-century Iran. Brill. ISBN 978-9004139114.
- Gnoli, G.; Jamzadeh, P. (1988). "Bahrām". In Yarshater, Ehsan (ed.). Encyclopædia Iranica (Online ed.). Encyclopædia Iranica Foundation. ISBN 978-0710091215.
- Hambly, Gavin R. G. (1991). "Iran during the reigns of Fath 'Alī Shāh and Muhammad Shāh". In Avery, Peter; Hambly, Gavin R. G.; Melville, Charles Peter (eds.). The Cambridge History of Iran: From Nadir Shah to the Islamic Republic. Vol. 7. Cambridge: Cambridge University Press. pp. 144–173. ISBN 0-521-20095-4.
- Khazeni, Arash (2009). Tribes and Empire on the Margins of Nineteenth-Century Iran. University of Washington Press. ISBN 978-0295989952.
- Marzolph, Ulrich; Zenhari, Roxana (2022). Mirzā ʿAli-Qoli Khoʾi: The Master Illustrator of Persian Lithographed Books in the Qajar Period. Vol. 1. Brill Publishers. ISBN 978-1845118280.
- Nava'i, A. (1986). "Bahrām Mīrzā, Moʿezz-al-Dawla". In Yarshater, Ehsan (ed.). Encyclopædia Iranica. Vol. II/5: Armenia and Iran IV–Art in Iran I. London and New York: Routledge & Kegan Paul. p. 524. ISBN 978-0-71009-105-5.
- Rabiei, Manijeh (2004). "Bahram Mirza Mo'ez od-Dowleh". Encyclopaedia of the World of Islam (in Persian). Vol. 4. Encyclopaedia Islamica Foundation. ISBN 978-964-447-004-2.
- Sahraei, Shahram (2016). "Mirza Abotaleb Zanjani". Encyclopaedia of the World of Islam (in Persian). Vol. 21. Encyclopaedia Islamica Foundation. ISBN 978-964-447-004-2.
