= Khayrat-é Hésan =

Encyclopedia of Women in the Islamic World (pub. 1890s)

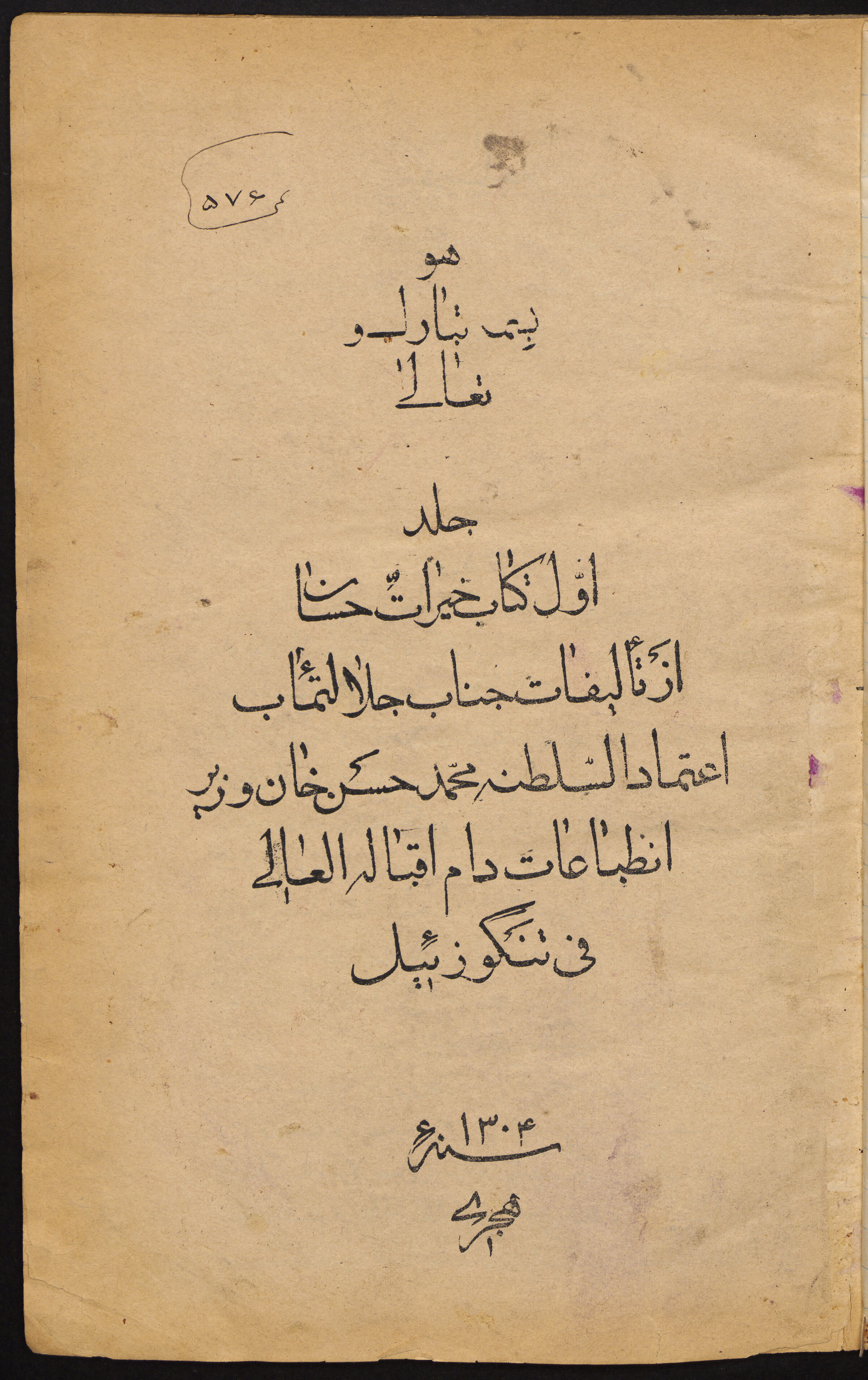
Colophon of the first volume; published in 1887, Tehran, Iran

Khayrat-é Hésan (Persian: خیرات حسان; lit. Fairest Women) is a comprehensive biographical encyclopedia of prominent women in the Islamic world, written in Persian and compiled in three volumes by Mohammad Hasan Khan Maraghe’i, known as E'temad os-Saltaneh (died 1895). A notable writer and politician of the Qajar era, E'temad os-Saltaneh organised this work alphabetically and documented the lives of distinguished women from the early Islamic period to his own time. Due to its writing style, use of varied sources, and comprehensiveness, this work is considered one of the most significant historical records of its kind.

== The book ==
=== Sources and motivation for compilation ===
To compile Khayrat-é Hésan, E'temad os-Saltaneh relied primarily on the book Mashahir al-Nisa (Arabic: مشاهیر النساء; lit. Famous Women), a Turkish work written by his contemporary, Mehmed Zihni Efendi. (Note: محمد ذهنی افندی) Mashahir al-Nisa was a biographical encyclopedia focusing on notable Muslim women. E'temad os-Saltaneh not only translated this work with great care but also added his findings and insights, making changes in some parts. Through this process, Khayrat-é Hésan became a more comprehensive and diversified source than the original Turkish text.

In the preface of the book, the author writes about the reason and method for its compilation as follows:

"It so befell that one of the Companions narrated a hadith, recounting words ascribed to the Followers. From that day forth, I resolved to undertake a thorough investigation of the conditions of renowned women, and, with the counsel of learned men in this art, to lay the groundwork for such an endeavor. By fortunate happenstance, whilst occupied in these thoughts, I chanced upon the book Mashahir al-Nisa by the distinguished and erudite Mehmed Zihni Efendi—may his beneficence endure. Upon beholding this work, I said to myself… Verily, I made it the foundation of my own translation, adding thereto my own learning, accompanied by such alterations as my feeble judgment deemed appropriate. I commenced by setting down the accounts of Khayrat-é Hésan, to whom I share a kinship, and with whom I am bound by the ties of faith and homeland. Should any reference to those outside the fold of Islam appear in this compilation, let it be known it is by way of approximation and with the intention of fostering goodwill. In this undertaking, I have been graced with the notes of His Royal Highness Soltan-Ahmad Mirza Azod od-Dowleh, that noble and high-minded prince."

In creating this work, E'temad os-Saltaneh utilised numerous sources, including dozens of Arabic, Turkish, and Persian texts. In addition to these well-known sources, he referenced other texts and documents, many of which can only be identified and distinguished from one another through meticulous comparison of the Persian and Turkish versions. Through his extensive study and research in various works, he was able to expand the scope of information in the book and include first-hand knowledge of women, particularly those of his era.

Throughout the book, E'temad os-Saltaneh sometimes cites his sources and occasionally critiques the views of earlier authors to correct and expand upon their information. By carefully analyzing these sources, he was able to highlight important details, especially accounts rarely found in other works. Some information was taken directly from Mashahir al-Nisa without significant alterations, while other sections were augmented with additional information and modifications by E'temad os-Saltaneh, resulting in a more comprehensive narrative.

=== Content and structure ===
The preface of the book is dedicated to Naser al-Din Shah Qajar. The work primarily focuses on Muslim women, including poets, writers, calligraphers, artists, scholars, jurists, ascetics, mystics, saints, members of royal harems, wives and daughters of notables, lovers, and women who influenced history across various ethnicities, including Turk, Arab, Persian, Indian, and Ethiopian.

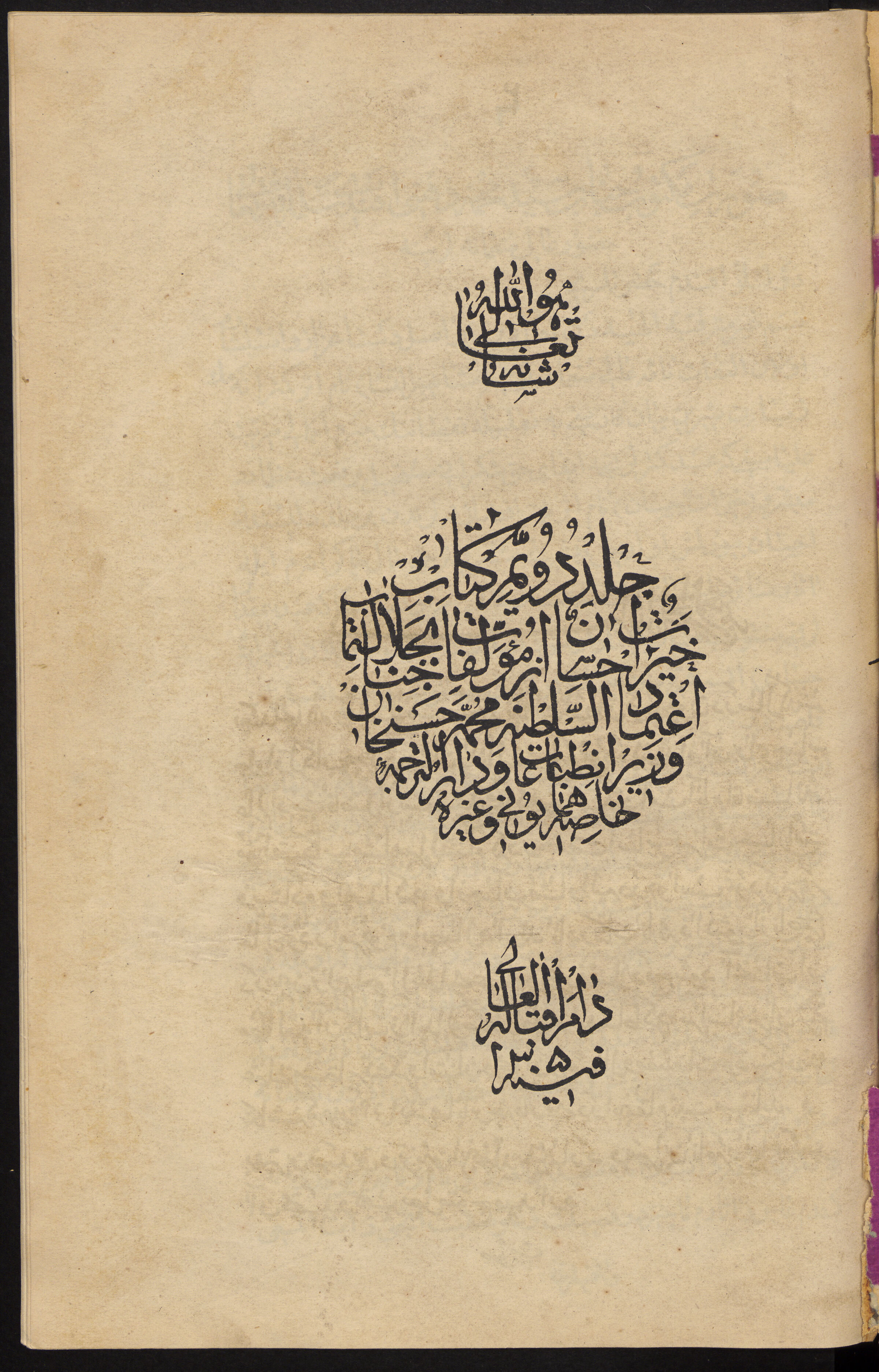
Colophon of the second volume; published in 1888, Tehran, Iran

In this work, E'temad os-Saltaneh sometimes refers to a single figure under multiple names and includes attributes and titles as entries. For instance, the entry Lady of Heaven (Note: بانوی بهشت) provides a brief explanation before referring to Fatimah. In some cases, a single entry covers multiple individuals, such as Safiyah Khatun, which mentions several Safiyahs, or Fawatim, (Note: فواطم) listing several women named Fatimah.

Volume One starts with the biography of Amina bint Wahb and ends with Rayta. At the end of this volume, it resumes with Amina and concludes with Raya Aqiliyyah. (Note: رَیّا عَقیلیّه) According to the author's note in Volume Two, a copy of the first volume was sent to Mohammad Zehni, who expressed satisfaction after reading it. The original Turkish text of Mashahir al-Nisa and its Persian translation appear at the beginning of Volume Two. The second volume continues with the biography of Za'iri (Note: زائری) and ends with Fadila Ansariyyah. (Note: فاضله انصاریّه)

Subsequently, E'temad os-Saltaneh, under the heading Supplement and Apology, (Note: تذییل و اعتذار) apologizes for not including the biographies of many women in the book and promises to append a relatively extensive supplement in the conclusion of the book. Nonetheless, he includes several biographies at the end of the second volume. Volume Three begins with a reference to the life of Fatimah in books of narrations and hadiths, continues with the biography of Fatimah bint Hussein (Note: فاطمه بنت حسین) and ends with Yahabullah al-Habashiyyah. (Note: یَهَبُ اللّه الحبشیة) A supplement containing anecdotes about female poets and their poems follows, and the biographies of Maryam Khanum (Note: مریم خانم) and Fatimah Sultan Khanum, (Note: فاطمه سلطان خانم) the daughter and granddaughter of Qa'em Maqam Farahani, are added.

=== Number of entries ===
In total, Khayrat-é Hésan contains 927 entries:

- Volume One: 380 entries from "A" to "R," with 46 additional entries
- Volume Two: 260 entries from "Z" to "F," with 7 additional entries
- Volume Three: 232 entries from "F" to "Y," with 2 additional entries

According to Golchin Ma'ani's count, the book includes biographies of 52 Persian-speaking poets, some of whom are mentioned more than once. Among all the entries, the biography of Sakina bint Husayn (Note: سكينة بنت الحسين) is the most detailed in this biographical encyclopedia.

=== Literary characteristics ===
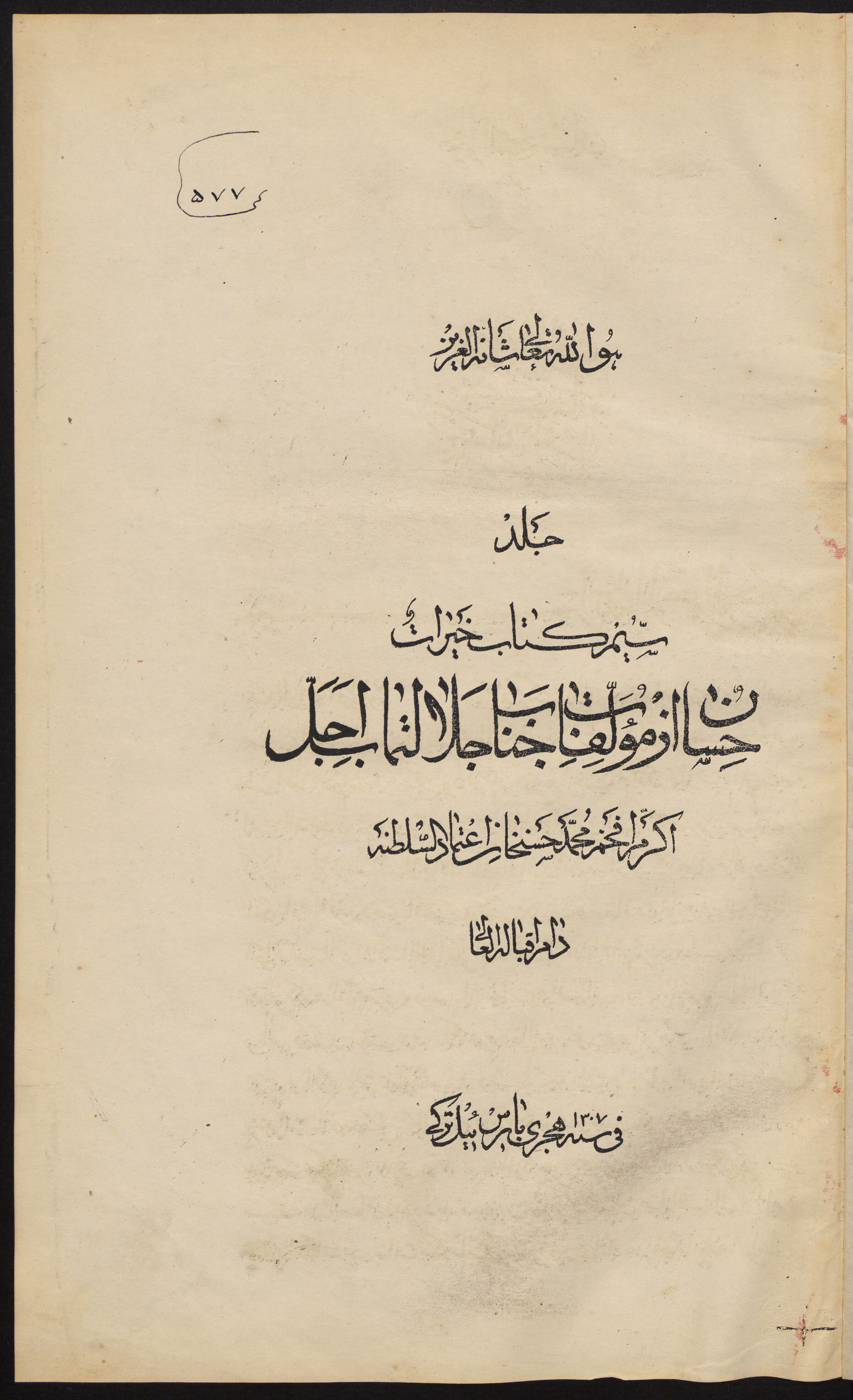
Colophon of the third volume; published in 1890, Tehran, Iran

The preface of the book is written in a smooth, balanced prose style interwoven with Persian and Arabic poetry. The text of the book also employs some degree of balance and rhythm. The biographies of female poets are accompanied by samples of their Persian, Arabic, or Turkish poetry. Alongside the biographies of scholarly women, the author provides translations of poetry, tales, explanations of terms, meanings of verses, historical anecdotes, jurisprudential discussions, and other related information. E'temad os-Saltaneh translates certain Arabic content, including two sermons of Zainab and Arabic poems, into Persian.

=== Arrangement ===
The entries in Khayrat-é Hésan are organized alphabetically, with each letter presented in a separate section. The sole exception is the entry for Amina bint Wahb, which is placed at the beginning of the book before other names due to her revered status as the mother of the Muhammad. Additionally, the entries under the letters "B" and "P" are intermixed.

=== Publication and public reception ===
In a note titled Notification, (Note: اخطار) E'temad os-Saltaneh mentions that the publication of the first volume of the book was met with public enthusiasm. Although a few individuals sought to discredit the book, the author responded to their criticisms, affirming the significance of his work.

=== Publication ===
Khayrat-é Hésan was first published in three volumes in large folio format with high-quality Naskh script by Mohammad Sadeq Shams al-Kitab (Note: محمدصادق شمس‌الکتاب) in Tehran: the first volume in 1887, the second in 1888, and the third in 1890. At the end of the first volume, a yearly calendar was appended, and at the end of all three volumes, there were lists of Qajar shahs, a record of Naser al-Din Shah’s reign, names of the royal family, Qajar nobility, state officials, and foreign territories. The book was reprinted in 1893 and 1894.
