= Badi-al-Molk Mirza =

Iranian prince, statesman and author

Badi-al-Molk Mirza (Persian: بدیع‌الملک میرزا; died after 1891) was a Qajar prince, statesman and author in 19th-century Iran. He was the son of Emamqoli Mirza Emad od-Dowleh. His granddaughter was the Modernist painter, Shokouh Riazi.

== Sources ==
- Calmard, Jean (2017). "Kermanshah iv. History to 1953". In Yarshater, Ehsan (ed.). Encyclopædia Iranica. Vol. XVI/3: Kégl–Kešaʾi Dialect. London and New York: Routledge & Kegan Paul. pp. 319–324. ISBN 978-1-934283-50-9.
- Mousavi, Reza (2019). "بدیع الملک میرزا عمادالدوله". The Great Islamic Encyclopaedia (in Persian).
