= Agha Khan Moghaddam =

Agha Khan Moghaddam (Note: Also spelled "Moghadam", "Moqaddam" or "Moqadam") was a Safavid military leader and official, prominent in the late 16th and early 17th centuries. Of Turkoman origin, he was a member of the Moghaddam branch of the Otuziki/Otuzayeki tribe, who were based in the Karabagh Province. When King (Shah) Abbas I (r. 1588–1629) removed Qobad Khan Mokri, then governor of Marageh and a member of the Kurdish Mokri tribe, from his position in 1609 he appointed Agha Khan Moghaddam as its new governor (hakem). From then on, and decisively from 1610 to 1611, when the Mokri Kurds in Maragheh were massacred on the order of Abbas I, the governorship of the city was invariably held by members of the Moghaddam clan until the end of the Qajar period.

== Sources ==
- Floor, Willem (2001). Safavid Government Institutions. Costa Mesa, California: Mazda Publishers. p. 104. ISBN 978-1568591353.
- Floor, Willem M. (2008). Titles and Emoluments in Safavid Iran: A Third Manual of Safavid Administration, by Mirza Naqi Nasiri. Washington, DC: Mage Publishers. p. 238. ISBN 978-1933823232.
- Maeda, Hirotake (2006). "The forced migrations and reorganisation of the regional order in the Caucasus by Safavid Iran: Preconditions and developments described by Fazli Khuzani". In Ieda, Osamu; Uyama, Tomohiko (eds.). Reconstruction and interaction of Slavic Eurasia and its neighbouring worlds (PDF). Slavic Eurasian Studies, No.10. Sapporo: Slavic Research Centre, Hokkaido University. pp. 242, 245–246. ISBN 4938637391.
