= Nava, Mazandaran =

Nava نوا
- Village
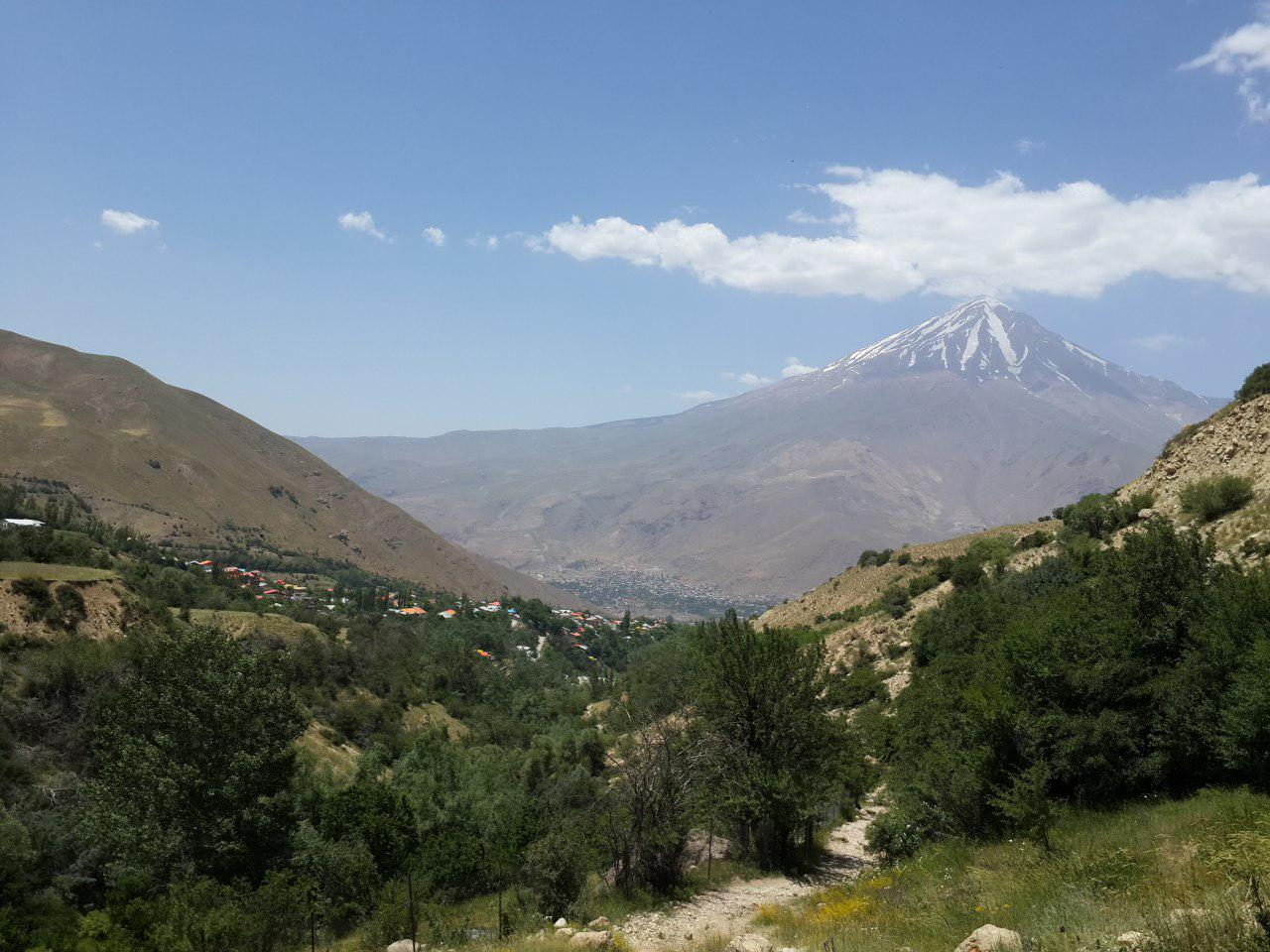
- Nava village and Mount Damavand

- Location within Iran
- Coordinates: 35°51′16″N 52°12′39″E
- Country: Iran
- Province: Mazandaran
- County: Amol
- Bakhsh: Larijan
- Rural District: Bala Larijan

Population (2006)
  - Total: 185
- Time zone: UTC+3:30 (IRST)

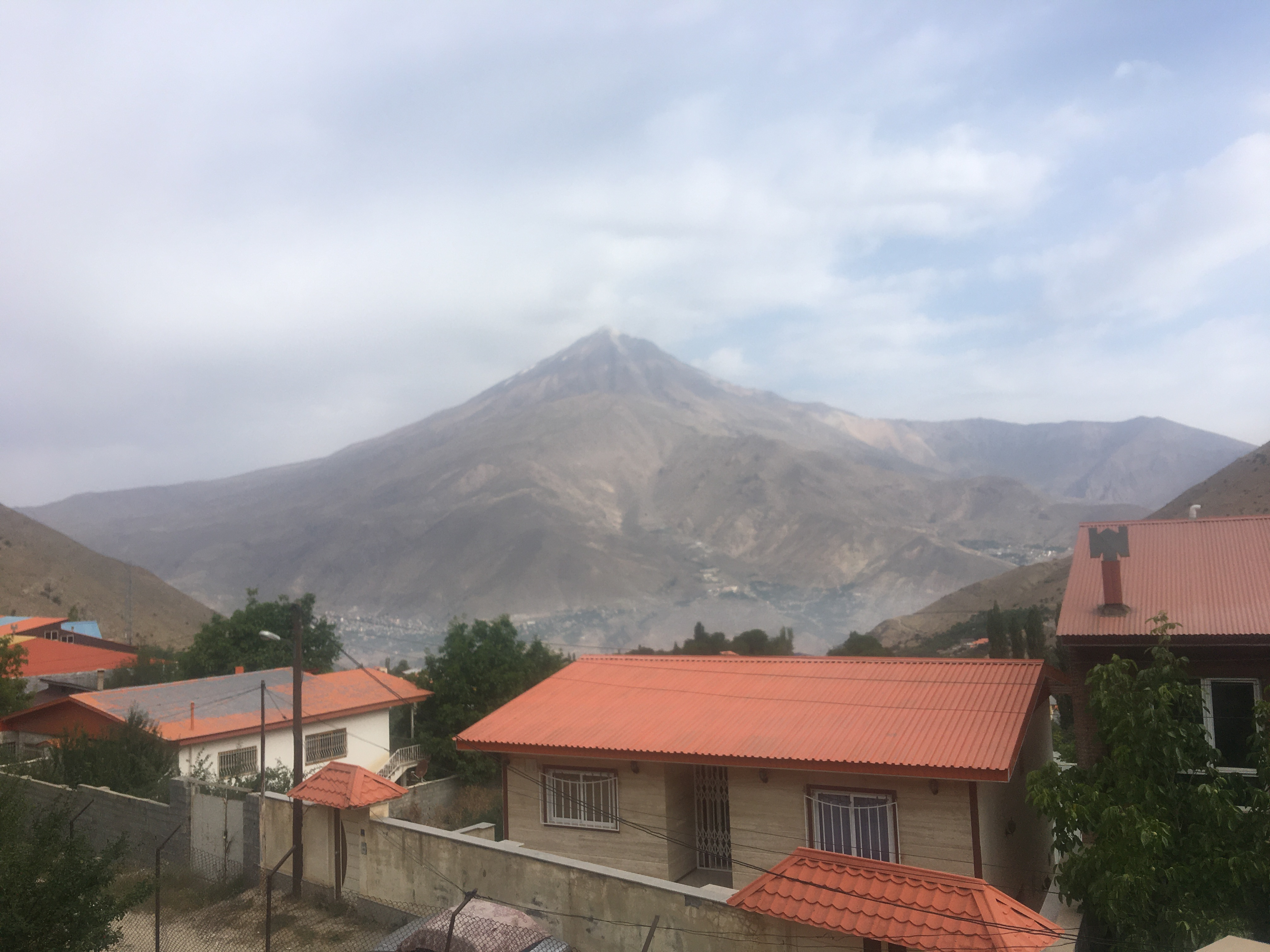
Nava overlooking mount Damavand

Nava (Persian: نوا, also Romanized as Nevā and Navā) is a village in Bala Larijan Rural District, Larijan District, Amol County, Mazandaran Province, Iran. At the 2016 census, its population was 51, in 24 families, down from 185 people in 2006.
