= Toprakkale =

Toprakkale can refer to:

- Toprakkale (castle)
- Toprakkale, Aziziye
- Toprakkale, Çayırlı
- Toprakkale, Hınıs
- Toprakkale, Oltu
- Toprakkale, Osmaniye
- Toprakkale–İskenderun railway
