= Mohammad-Hossein Mirza =

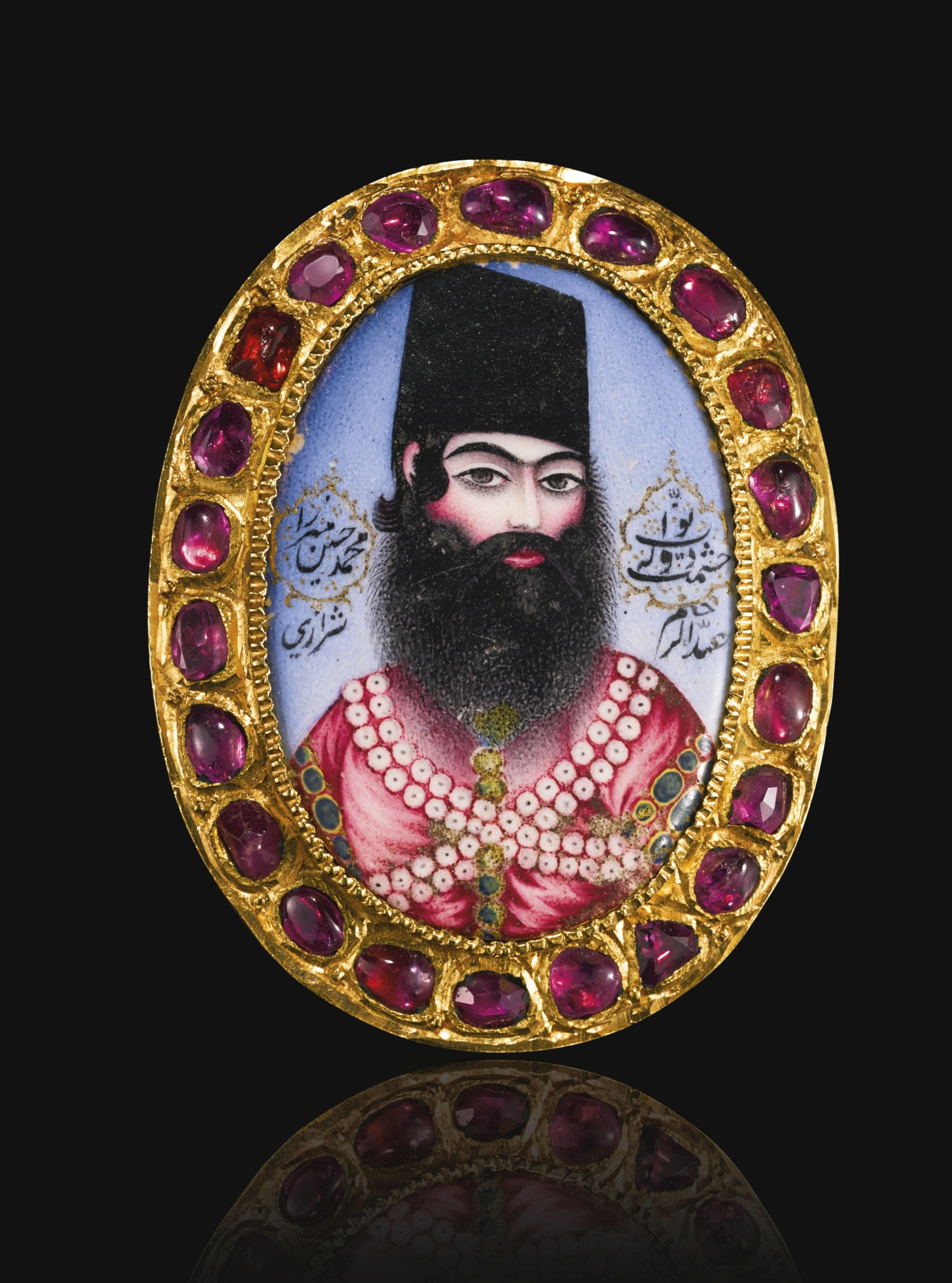
- A enamelled and gem-set portrait medallion of Mohammad-Hossein Mirza. Made in Qajar Iran in the early 19th century

Governor of Kermanshah
- 1st tenure: 1821–1826
- Predecessor: Mohammad-Ali Mirza Dowlatshah
- Successor: Tahmasp Mirza
- 2nd tenure: 1829–1835
- Predecessor: Tahmasp Mirza
- Successor: Bahram Mirza
- Died: 1845/46; Tabriz, Qajar Iran
- Dynasty: Qajar
- Father: Mohammad-Ali Mirza Dowlatshah
- Religion: Twelver Shia Islam

Mohammad-Hossein Mirza (Persian: محمد حسین میرزا) was a Qajar prince, who governed Kermanshah twice, between 1821–1826 and 1829–1835. He was the eldest son of Mohammad-Ali Mirza Dowlatshah and grandson of Fath-Ali Shah Qajar (r. 1797–1834).

== Biography ==
After the death of his father in 1821, Mohammad-Hossein Mirza succeeded him as the governor of Kermanshah. In 1826, he was replaced by his brother Tahmasp Mirza due to his debauchery and lack of competence, although he later got back the position in 1829. The death of his grandfather, Fath-Ali Shah in October 1834 caught Mohammad-Hossein Mirza off guard. The military establishment that had been his father's pride was no longer with him, and it does not appear that he had the ability or the desire to try become the new shah. Additionally, he had long since lost the friendships of the tribes that his father had enjoyed exceptionally warm ties with. Due to the remoteness of Kermanshah, he was unable to assess the proportional forces of the three parties fighting for the throne. As a result, he wrote pledges of allegiance to them; Hossein Ali Mirza in Shiraz, Ali Mirza Zel as-Soltan in the capital Tehran, and Mohammad Shah Qajar, who was reportedly still in Tabriz.

Mohammad-Hossein Mirza's attempts to preserve good relations with all three parties was unsuccessful, and when Mohammad Shah had consolidated his authority in January 1835, he summoned Mohammad-Hossein Mirza to Tehran and sent his brother Bahram Mirza to Kermanshah as its new governor. Mohammad-Hossein Mirza attempted to flee, but was soon captured. Together with other royal family members who were seen as possible challenges to the new government, he spent his final days imprisoned in the fortress of Ardabil. Later, he was relocated to Tabriz, where died in 1845 or 1846.

== Sources ==
- Amanat, Abbas (1994). "Dawlatšāh, Moḥammad-ʿAlī Mīrzā". In Yarshater, Ehsan (ed.). Encyclopædia Iranica. Vol. VII/2: Dastūr al-Afāżel–Dehqān I. London and New York: Routledge & Kegan Paul. pp. 147–149. ISBN 978-1-56859-020-2.
- Bamdad, Mehdi (1966). شرح حال رجال ایران در قرن ۱۲ و ۱۳ و ۱۴ هجری [Dictionary of National Biography of Iran, 1700-1960, vol. 3]. Tehran.
- Calmard, Jean (2017). "Kermanshah iv. History to 1953". In Yarshater, Ehsan (ed.). Encyclopædia Iranica. Vol. XVI/3: Kégl–Kešaʾi Dialect. London and New York: Routledge & Kegan Paul. pp. 319–324. ISBN 978-1-934283-50-9.
- Hambly, Gavin R. G. (1991). "Iran during the reigns of Fath 'Alī Shāh and Muhammad Shāh". In Avery, Peter; Hambly, Gavin R. G.; Melville, Charles Peter (eds.). The Cambridge History of Iran: From Nadir Shah to the Islamic Republic. Vol. 7. Cambridge: Cambridge University Press. pp. 144–173. ISBN 0-521-20095-4.
- Nava'i, A. (1986). "Bahrām Mīrzā, Moʿezz-al-Dawla". In Yarshater, Ehsan (ed.). Encyclopædia Iranica. Vol. II/5: Armenia and Iran IV–Art in Iran I. London and New York: Routledge & Kegan Paul. p. 524. ISBN 978-0-71009-105-5.
