= Moqaddam family =

The Moqaddam family (also known as the Moqaddam tribe) are a Turkic tribe/family centered in the Iranian town of Maragheh. They were created by the Safavid monarch Shah Abbas I (r. 1588–1629) as part of his policy to redistribute land as well as the restructure provincial governmental and tribal structures.

The Moqaddam were originally a clan of the Otuziki tribe of Karabakh. Ghazi Soltan, who had served Shah Abbas I during the latters time as a prince, was appointed the leader of the Moqaddam. The Iranian historian and official Fazli Isfahani Khuzani reported that the Moqaddam initially encompassed 70 families, but increased to 10,000 under Shah Abbas I due to the massive support he gave to the sons of Ghazi Soltan, Niyaz and Agha Khan Moqaddam. In 1609, Shah Abbas I installed Agha Khan Moqaddam as the governor of Maragheh, a position that the Moqaddams would mostly keep until 1925.

Under the Qajar dynasty (1779–1925), the Moqaddam governors administrated Maragheh in a similar way as the Qajars did in Iran. For five generations the Moqaddams managed to have significant autonomy from the central government.

Following the ascent of Reza Shah of the Pahlavi dynasty, the provincial authority was incorporated into the national government, and thus the Moqaddams lost their status as self-governing provincial rulers. The most notable members of the Moqaddam joined the national elite, but their influence in provincial political matters began to wane. Despite this, Reza Shah's appointments in the provincial administration continued to be significantly influenced by the Moqaddams and other families of the aristocratic and commercial elite, who supported and participated in his government.

The historian Mary-Jo Delvecchio Good, writing in 1977, states that "The Moqaddams who remain in Maragheh are still quite wealthy but have lost much of their prestige along with their villages and political roles."

== Governors ==
The known Moqaddam governors of Maragheh were the following:

- Agha Khan Moqaddam (1609–1625)
- Ghazi Soltan (1625–1648)
- Abdol-Ghaffar Khan (1694–1695)
- Ahmad Khan Moqaddam (?–1830)
- Hossein Pasha Khan (1830–1848)
- Eskandar Khan (late 1848–late 1890s)
- Samad Khan Shoja al-Dowleh (late 1890s–1911)
- Eskandar Khan Sadar Nasr (1911–1925)

== Sources ==
- Bournoutian, George (2021). From the Kur to the Aras: A Military History of Russia's Move into the South Caucasus and the First Russo-Iranian War, 1801–1813. Brill. ISBN 978-9004445154.
- Floor, Willem (2008). Titles and Emoluments in Safavid Iran: A Third Manual of Safavid Administration, by Mirza Naqi Nasiri. Washington, D.C.: Mage Publishers. ISBN 978-1933823232.
- Good, Mary-Jo Delvecchio (1977). "Social Hierarchy in Provincial Iran: The Case of Qajar Maragheh". Iranian Studies. 10 (3): 129–163. doi:10.1080/00210867708701529. JSTOR 4310267. (registration required)
- Maeda, Hirotake (2006). "The forced migrations and reorganisation of the regional order in the Caucasus by Safavid Iran: Preconditions and developments described by Fazli Khuzani". In Ieda, Osamu; Uyama, Tomohiko (eds.). Reconstruction and interaction of Slavic Eurasia and its neighbouring worlds (PDF). Slavic Eurasian Studies, No.10. Sapporo: Slavic Research Centre, Hokkaido University. pp. 242, 245–246. ISBN 4938637391.
- Matthee, Rudi (2011). Persia in Crisis: Safavid Decline and the Fall of Isfahan. I.B.Tauris. ISBN 978-0857731814.
- Potts, Daniel T. (2014), Nomadism in Iran: From Antiquity to the Modern Era, London and New York: Oxford University Press, ISBN 978-0190600594
- Tapper, Richard (1997). Frontier Nomads of Iran: A Political and Social History of the Shahsevan. Cambridge University Press. ISBN 978-0-521-58336-7.
