= Emamqoli Mirza Emad od-Dowleh =

Qajar prince (d. 1875)

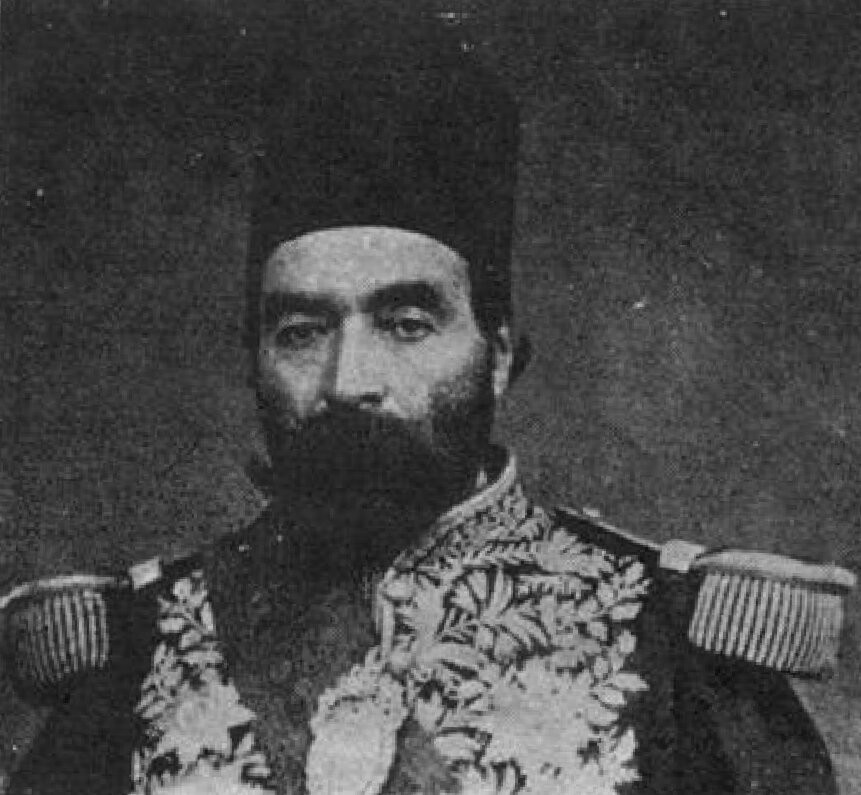
- Photograph of Emamqoli Mirza Emad od-Dowleh

Governor of Kermanshah
- Tenure: 1852–1875
- Successor: Badi-al-Molk Mirza
- Died: 1875
- Issue: Badi-al-Molk Mirza; Ashraf os-Saltaneh
- House: Qajar
- Father: Mohammad-Ali Mirza Dowlatshah
- Religion: Twelver Shia Islam

Emamqoli Mirza Emad od-Dowleh (Persian: امام‌قلی میرزا عمادالدوله) was a Qajar prince who held the governorship of the western Iranian province of Kermanshah from 1852 until his death in 1875, with a one year interruption. He was the sixth son of Mohammad-Ali Mirza Dowlatshah. He commissioned the construction of Emad od-Dowleh Mosque.

After his death, he was succeeded by his son Badi-al-Molk Mirza.

== Sources ==
- Amanat, Abbas (1994). "Dawlatšāh, Moḥammad-ʿAlī Mīrzā". In Yarshater, Ehsan (ed.). Encyclopædia Iranica. Vol. VII/2: Dastūr al-Afāżel–Dehqān I. London and New York: Routledge & Kegan Paul. pp. 147–149. ISBN 978-1-56859-020-2.
- Calmard, Jean (2017). "Kermanshah iv. History to 1953". In Yarshater, Ehsan (ed.). Encyclopædia Iranica. Vol. XVI/3: Kégl–Kešaʾi Dialect. London and New York: Routledge & Kegan Paul. pp. 319–324. ISBN 978-1-934283-50-9.
