= Naderabad =

Naderabad (Persian: نادراباد) may refer to the now abandoned city created by Nader Shah Afshar:

- Naderabad, Kandahar

Naderabad (Persian: نادراباد) may refer to the following villages in Iran:

- Naderabad, Chaharmahal and Bakhtiari
- Naderabad, Ilam
- Naderabad, Kermanshah
- Naderabad, Kohgiluyeh and Boyer-Ahmad
- Naderabad, Markazi
- Naderabad, North Khorasan
- Naderabad, West Azerbaijan
- Naderabad, Maku, West Azerbaijan Province
- Naderabad, Zanjan
