= Anjir, Iran (disambiguation) =

Anjir (Persian: انجير) in Iran may refer to:

- Anjir, Iran, Ilam Province
- Anjir, East Azerbaijan
- Anjir, Hormozgan
- Anjir, Razavi Khorasan
- Anjir Mehi, Sistan and Baluchestan Province
- Anjir-e Sigan
- Anjir-e Ziraki
