= Qaleh Juq, Ilam =

Village in Ilam province, Iran

Qaleh Juq Persian: قلعه جوق
- Village
- Location within Iran Location within Ilam Province
- Coordinates: 33°23′48″N 46°34′53″E
- Country: Iran
- Province: Ilam
- County: Malekshahi
- District: Gachi
- Rural District: Kabirkuh

Population (2016)
  - Total: 1,468
- Time zone: UTC+3:30 (IRST)

Qaleh Juq (Persian: قلعه جوق) (Note: Also romanized as Qal‘eh Jūq) is a village in, and the capital of, Kabirkuh Rural District of Gachi District, Malekshahi County, Ilam province, Iran.

== Demographics ==
=== Ethnicity ===
The village is populated by Kurds.

=== Population ===
At the time of the 2006 National Census, the village's population was 1,724 in 275 households, when it was in Gachi Rural District of the former Malekshahi District (Note: Formerly Arkavazi District) of Mehran County. The following census in 2011 counted 1,262 people in 308 households, by which time the district had been separated from the county in the establishment of Malekshahi County. The rural district was transferred to the new Gachi District, and Qaleh Juq was transferred to Kabirkuh Rural District created in the district. The 2016 census measured the population of the village as 1,468 people in 371 households. It was the most populous village in its rural district.
