= Dul Kabud-e Khvoshadul =

Village in Ilam province, Iran

Dul Kabud-e Khvoshadul Persian: دول كبود خوشادول
- Village
- Location within Iran Location within Ilam Province
- Coordinates: 33°15′26″N 46°41′56″E
- Country: Iran
- Province: Ilam
- County: Malekshahi
- District: Central
- Rural District: Shuhan

Population (2016)
  - Total: 142
- Time zone: UTC+3:30 (IRST)

Dul Kabud-e Khvoshadul (Persian: دول كبودخوشادول) (Note: Also romanized as Dūl Kabūd-e Khvoshādūl) is a village in, and the capital of, Shuhan Rural District of the Central District of Malekshahi County, Ilam province, Iran.

== Demographics ==
=== Ethnicity ===
The village is populated by Lurs.

=== Population ===
At the time of the 2006 National Census, the village's population was 128 in 7527households, when it was in the former Malekshahi District (Note: Formerly Arkavazi District) of Mehran County. The following census in 2011 counted 153 people in 39 households, by which time the district had been separated from the county in the establishment of Malekshahi County. The rural district was transferred to the new Central District. The 2016 census measured the population of the village as 142 people in 57 households.
