= Kalak-e Naqi =

Village in Ilam province, Iran

Kalak-e Naqi Persian: کلک نقی
- Village
- Location within Iran Location within Ilam Province
- Coordinates: 33°22′02″N 46°30′02″E
- Country: Iran
- Province: Ilam
- County: Malekshahi
- District: Gachi
- Rural District: Gachi

Population (2016)
  - Total: 339
- Time zone: UTC+3:30 (IRST)

Kalak-e Naqi (Persian: کلک نقی) (Note: Also romanized as Kalak-e Naqī; also known as Kalak Naftī and Sarāb-e Kalak) is a village in Gachi Rural District of Gachi District, Malekshahi County, Ilam province, Iran.

== Demographics ==
=== Ethnicity ===
The village is populated by Kurds.

=== Population ===
At the time of the 2006 National Census, the village's population was 508 in 98 households, when it was in the former Malekshahi District (Note: Formerly Arkavazi District) of Mehran County. The following census in 2011 counted 477 people in 107 households, by which time the district had been separated from the county in the establishment of Malekshahi County. The rural district was transferred to the new Gachi District. The 2016 census measured the population of the village as 339 people in 90 households. It was the most populous village in its rural district.
