= List of counties in Ilam province, Iran =

Ilam province is divided into 11 counties, 28 districts, 52 rural districts.

Counties of Ilam province

On 4 January 2020, Holeylan, having been a district of Chardavol County, became the 11th county of Ilam province.

== List ==
The following is the list of counties of Ilam province.

County	Seat	Population	Area (km^{2})
Abdanan	Abdanan	47,851	2,520
Ilam	Ilam	235,144	2,168
Eyvan	Eyvan	49,491	914
Badreh	Badreh	15,614	568
Chardavol (Note: The area and population of Holeylan and Chardavol counties are estimated because Holeylan county was established on 4 January 2020 and prior to that it was a district of Chardavol County and the latest official numbers belong to Iran's 2016 Census.)	Sarableh	42,105	920
Darreh Shahr	Darreh Shahr	43,708	896
Dehloran	Dehloran	65,630	6,671
Sirvan	Lumar	14,404	653
Malekshahi	Arkavaz	21,138	1,740
Mehran	Mehran	29,797	2,436
Holeylan	Towhid	15,276	620
