= Gonbad-e Pirmohammad =

Village in Ilam province, Iran

Gonbad-e Pirmohammad Persian: گنبد پیرمحمد
- Village
- Location within Iran Location within Ilam Province
- Coordinates: 33°15′03″N 46°32′25″E
- Country: Iran
- Province: Ilam
- County: Malekshahi
- District: Central
- Rural District: Chamzey

Population (2016)
  - Total: 1,573
- Time zone: UTC+3:30 (IRST)

Gonbad-e Pirmohammad (Persian: گنبد پیرمحمد) (Note: Also romanized as Gonbad Pīr Moḩammad, Gonbad-e Pir Mohammad, and Gonbad-e Pīr Moḩammad; also known as Emāmzādeh Pīr Moḩad, Emāmzādeh Pīr Moḩammad, Īmāmzādeh Pīr Mohad, Īmamzade Pīr Mohan, and Pīr Moḩammad) is a village in Chamzey Rural District of the Central District of Malekshahi County, Ilam province, Iran.

== Demographics ==
=== Ethnicity ===
The village is populated by Kurds.

=== Population ===
At the time of the 2006 National Census, the village's population was 1,766 in 341 households, when it was in the former Malekshahi District (Note: Formerly Arkavazi District) of Mehran County. The following census in 2011 counted 1,655 people in 424 households, by which time the district had been separated from the county in the establishment of Malekshahi County. The rural district was transferred to the new Central District. The 2016 census measured the population of the village as 1,573 people in 436 households. It was the most populous village in its rural district.
