= Faramarz Asadi =

- Haj Mirza Faramarz Asadi Khan
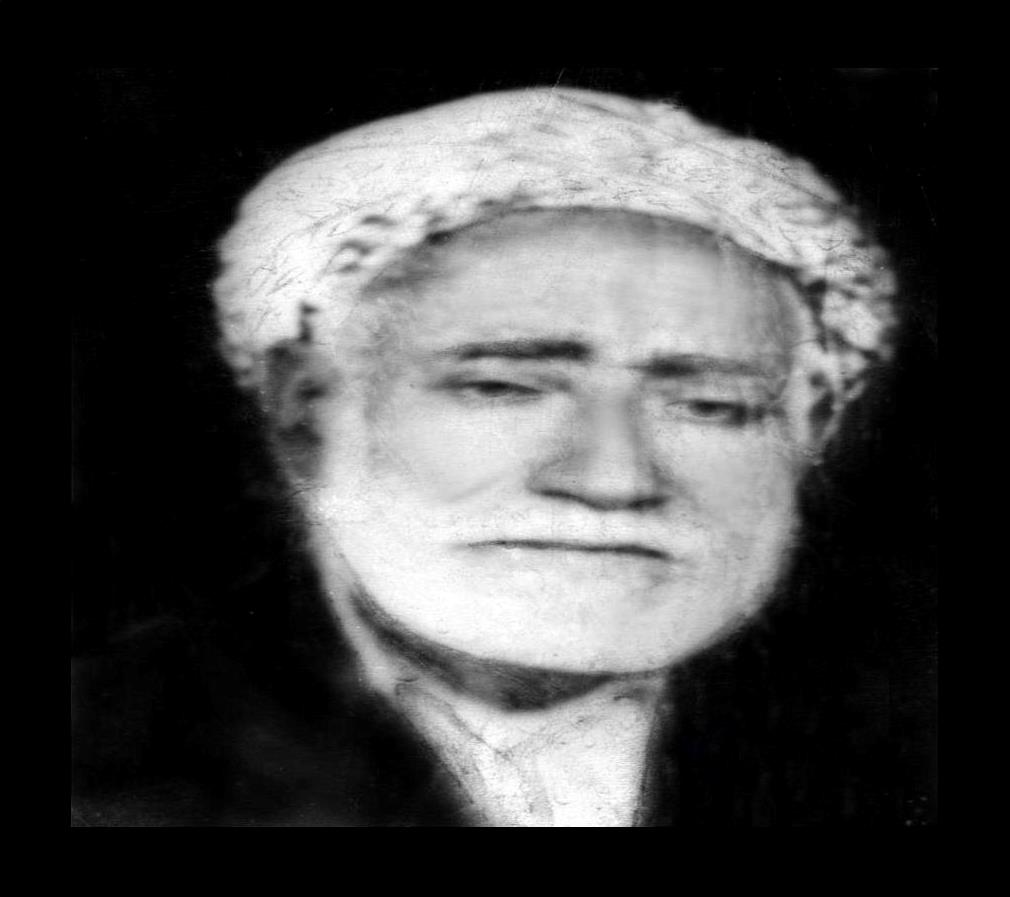

Tribal chief (sheikh) of the Malekshahi, (Mirza) prince of the Feyli Kurds
- Born: 1869; Arkavaz, Malekshahi County, Iran
- Died: 1969 (aged 99–100); Arkavaz
- Burial: Fatima Masumeh Shrine, Qom

Faramarz Asadi was the (Mirza) prince of the Feyli Kurds and the tribal chief (Sheikh) of the Malekshahi in Iran and Iraq. In World War II he was the vali of the Ilam province. Faramarz Asadi fought during the years of the Ottoman, Russian and British invaders. In 1945, after the World War II and the occupation of Iran, Asadi was appointed as governor of the Ilam province. He was one of the homeland patriots and an idealist, his lack of compromise with British and Russian forces in peace Poshtkoh impact was during World War II Asadi was the founder of the city of Arkavaz and the Malekshahi County.

== Biography ==
Asadi was the son of Iranian general Musa Khamis popular during the reign of Fath-Ali Shah Qajar, son of Amir Alijah Khamis, son of Amir Alijah shahMir. He descends into account Iran's mythical king Jamshid.

== Governor of Ilam ==
After World War II, through a decree by Mohammad Reza Pahlavi, Asadi was appointed as governor of Ilam province.
