= Cheshmeh Pahn, Malekshahi =

Village in Ilam province, Iran

Cheshmeh Pahn Persian: چشمه پهن
- Village
- Location within Iran Location within Ilam Province
- Coordinates: 33°20′49″N 46°45′59″E
- Country: Iran
- Province: Ilam
- County: Malekshahi
- District: Central
- Rural District: Shuhan

Population (2016)
  - Total: 330
- Time zone: UTC+3:30 (IRST)

Cheshmeh Pahn (Persian: چشمه پهن) (Note: Also known as Chashma Kampana, Chashmeh Kānīpanaeh, Chashmeh Kanīpāneh, and Cheshmeh-ye Kānī Pāneh) is a village in Shuhan Rural District of the Central District of Malekshahi County, Ilam province, Iran.

== Demographics ==
=== Ethnicity ===
The village is populated by Lurs.

=== Population ===
At the time of the 2006 National Census, the village's population was 382 in 75 households, when it was in the former Malekshahi District (Note: Formerly Arkavazi District) of Mehran County. The following census in 2011 counted 326 people in 83 households, by which time the district had been separated from the county in the establishment of Malekshahi County. The rural district was transferred to the new Central District. The 2016 census measured the population of the village as 330 people in 64 households. It was the most populous village in its rural district.
