= Garab Khvoshadul =

Garab Khvoshadul گراب خوشادول
- Village
- Location within Iran
- Coordinates: 33°16′02″N 46°42′46″E
- Country: Iran
- Province: Ilam
- County: Malekshahi
- Bakhsh: Central
- Rural District: Shuhan

Population (2006)
  - Total: 27
- Time zone: UTC+3:30 (IRST)
  - Summer (DST): UTC+4:30 (IRDT)

Garab Khvoshadul (Persian: گراب خوشادول, also Romanized as Garāb Khvoshādūl and Garāb Khowshādūl) is a village in Shuhan Rural District, in the Central District of Malekshahi County, Ilam Province, Iran. As of the 2006 Iranian census, its population was 27, in 5 families.
