= Tut-e Khvoshadul =

Tut-e Khvoshadul توتخوشادول
- Village
- Location within Iran
- Coordinates: 33°13′00″N 46°41′00″E
- Country: Iran
- Province: Ilam
- County: Malekshahi
- Bakhsh: Central
- Rural District: Shuhan

Population (2006)
  - Total: 84
- Time zone: UTC+3:30 (IRST)
  - Summer (DST): UTC+4:30 (IRDT)

Tut-e Khvoshadul (Persian: توتخوشادول, also Romanized as Tūt-e Khvoshādūl and Tūt-e Khowshādūl; also known as Tūt Shūhān) is a village in Shuhan Rural District, in the Central District of Malekshahi County, Ilam Province, Iran. At the 2006 census, its population was 84, in 18 families. The village is populated by Lurs.
