= Shirinabad-e Gachan =

Shirinabad-e Gachan شيرين ابادگچان
- Village
- Country: Iran
- Province: Ilam
- County: Malekshahi
- Bakhsh: Gachi
- Rural District: Gachi

Population (2006)
  - Total: 434
- Time zone: UTC+3:30 (IRST)
  - Summer (DST): UTC+4:30 (IRDT)

Shirinabad-e Gachan (Persian: شيرين ابادگچان, also Romanized as Shīrīnābād-e Gachān) is a village in Gachi Rural District, Gachi District, Malekshahi County, Ilam Province, Iran. At the 2006 census, its population was 434, in 58 families. The village is populated by Kurds.
