= Mehr, Ilam =

City in Ilam province, Iran

Mehr Persian: مهر
- City
- Location within Iran Location within Ilam Province
- Coordinates: 33°25′45″N 46°27′56″E
- Country: Iran
- Province: Ilam
- County: Malekshahi
- District: Gachi

Population (2016)
  - Total: 1,060
- Time zone: UTC+3:30 (IRST)

Mehr (Persian: مهر) is a city in, and the capital of, Gachi District of Malekshahi County, Ilam province, Iran.

== Demographics ==
=== Ethnicity ===
The city is populated by Kurds.

=== Population ===
At the time of the 2006 National Census, Mehr's population was 1,238 in 262 households, when it was a village in Gachi Rural District of the former Malekshahi District (Note: Formerly Arkavazi District) of Mehran County. The following census in 2011 counted 1,198 people in 319 households, by which time the district had been separated from the county in the establishment of Malekshahi County. The rural district was transferred to the new Gachi District. The 2016 census measured the population as 1,060 people in 301 households, when Mehr had been elevated to the status of a city.
