= Ban Rahman =

Ban Rahman بان رحمان
- Village
- Location within Iran
- Coordinates: 33°10′00″N 46°20′56″E
- Country: Iran
- Province: Ilam
- County: Mehran
- Bakhsh: Central
- Rural District: Mohsen Ab

Population (2006)
  - Total: 1,070
- Time zone: UTC+3:30 (IRST)
  - Summer (DST): UTC+4:30 (IRDT)

Ban Rahman (Persian: بان رحمان, also Romanized as Bān Raḩmān; also known as Bān Sheyţān) is a village in Mohsen Ab Rural District, in the Central District of Mehran County, Ilam Province, Iran. At the 2006 census, its population was 1,070, in 215 families. The village is populated by Kurds.
