= Ilam University Farm =

Ilam University Farm مزرعه اموزشي دانشگاه ايلام
- Village
- Country: Iran
- Province: Ilam
- County: Mehran
- Bakhsh: Central
- Rural District: Mohsen Ab

Population (2006)
  - Total: 104
- Time zone: UTC+3:30 (IRST)
  - Summer (DST): UTC+4:30 (IRDT)

Ilam University Farm (Persian: مزرعه اموزشي دانشگاه ايلام – Mazra‘eh-ye Āmūzshī Dānshgāh Īlām) is a village in Mohsen Ab Rural District, in the Central District of Mehran County, Ilam Province, Iran. At the 2006 census, its population was 104, in 13 families.
