= Shahid Kashuri =

Shahid Kashuri شهيدكشوري
- Village
- Country: Iran
- Province: Ilam
- County: Malekshahi
- Bakhsh: Central
- Rural District: Chamzey

Population (2006)
  - Total: 367
- Time zone: UTC+3:30 (IRST)
  - Summer (DST): UTC+4:30 (IRDT)

Shahid Kashuri (Persian: شهيدكشوري, also Romanized as Shahīd Kashūrī) is a village in Chamzey Rural District, in the Central District of Malekshahi County, Ilam Province, Iran. At the 2006 census, its population was 367, in 62 families. The village is populated by Kurds.
