= Ban-e Rushan =

Ban-e Rushan بانروشان
- Village
- Location within Iran
- Coordinates: 33°33′31″N 46°13′09″E
- Country: Iran
- Province: Ilam
- County: Mehran
- Bakhsh: Salehabad
- Rural District: Hejdandasht

Population (2006)
  - Total: 68
- Time zone: UTC+3:30 (IRST)
  - Summer (DST): UTC+4:30 (IRDT)

Ban-e Rushan (Persian: بانروشان, also Romanized as Bān-e Rūshān; also known as Bandar-e Ūsān, Bāndarīshān, Bandar-o-Sān, Bandarsān, Bandrīshan, and Bān Rīshān) is a village in Hejdandasht Rural District, Salehabad District, Mehran County, Ilam Province, Iran. At the 2006 census, its population was 68, in 19 families. The village is populated by Kurds.
