= Qarjiligan =

Qarjiligan قرجيليگان
- Village
- Location within Iran
- Coordinates: 33°15′13″N 46°27′37″E
- Country: Iran
- Province: Ilam
- County: Malekshahi
- Bakhsh: Central
- Rural District: Chamzey

Population (2006)
  - Total: 40
- Time zone: UTC+3:30 (IRST)
  - Summer (DST): UTC+4:30 (IRDT)

Qarjiligan (Persian: قرجيليگان, also Romanized as Qarjīlīgān; also known as Qarjalgān) is a village in Chamzey Rural District, in the Central District of Malekshahi County, Ilam Province, Iran. At the 2006 census, its population was 40, in 6 families. The village is populated by Kurds.
