= Darageh, Malekshahi =

Darageh درگه
- Village
- Location within Iran
- Coordinates: 33°17′00″N 46°38′00″E
- Country: Iran
- Province: Ilam
- County: Malekshahi
- Bakhsh: Central
- Rural District: Chamzey

Population (2006)
  - Total: 47
- Time zone: UTC+3:30 (IRST)
  - Summer (DST): UTC+4:30 (IRDT)

Darageh (Persian: درگه; also known as Dezkeh) is a village in Chamzey Rural District, in the Central District of Malekshahi County, Ilam Province, Iran. At the 2006 census, its population was 47, in 9 families. The village is populated by Kurds.
