= Pariab, Ilam =

Pariab پارياب
- Village
- Location within Iran
- Coordinates: 33°15′55″N 46°37′24″E
- Country: Iran
- Province: Ilam
- County: Malekshahi
- Bakhsh: Central
- Rural District: Chamzey

Population (2006)
  - Total: 155
- Time zone: UTC+3:30 (IRST)
  - Summer (DST): UTC+4:30 (IRDT)

Pariab (Persian: پارياب, also Romanized as Pārīāb) is a village in Chamzey Rural District, in the Central District of Malekshahi County, Ilam Province, Iran. At the 2006 census, its population was 155, in 36 families. The village is populated by Kurds.
