= Shahrak-e Changuleh =

Shahrak-e Changuleh شهرك چنگوله
- Village
- Country: Iran
- Province: Ilam
- County: Mehran
- Bakhsh: Central
- Rural District: Mohsen Ab

Population (2006)
  - Total: 1,254
- Time zone: UTC+3:30 (IRST)
  - Summer (DST): UTC+4:30 (IRDT)

Shahrak-e Changuleh (Persian: شهرك چنگوله, also Romanized as Shahrak-e Changūleh) is a village in Mohsen Ab Rural District, in the Central District of Mehran County, Ilam Province, Iran. At the 2006 census, its population was 1,254, in 276 families. The village is populated by kurds.
