= Cham Anar-e Sofla =

Cham Anar-e Sofla چم انارسفلي
- Village
- Location within Iran
- Coordinates: 33°15′47″N 46°32′22″E
- Country: Iran
- Province: Ilam
- County: Malekshahi
- Bakhsh: Central
- Rural District: Chamzey

Population (2006)
  - Total: 424
- Time zone: UTC+3:30 (IRST)
  - Summer (DST): UTC+4:30 (IRDT)

Cham Anar-e Sofla (Persian: چم انارسفلي, also Romanized as Cham Anār-e Soflá; also known as Cham Nār-e Soflá and Cheshmeh Anār-e Soflá) is a village in Chamzey Rural District, in the Central District of Malekshahi County, Ilam Province, Iran. At the 2006 census, its population was 424, in 83 families. The village is populated by Kurds.
