= Miantang =

Miantang or Miyantang (Persian: ميان تنگ) may refer to:

- Miantang-e Olya
- Miantang-e Sofla
- Miyantang-e Mansuri

== See also ==
- Mian Tang (disambiguation)
