= Sarab-e Kalak =

Sarab-e Kalak سراب كلك
- Village
- Location within Iran
- Coordinates: 33°22′00″N 46°30′00″E
- Country: Iran
- Province: Ilam
- County: Malekshahi
- Bakhsh: Gachi
- Rural District: Gachi

Population (2006)
  - Total: 57
- Time zone: UTC+3:30 (IRST)
  - Summer (DST): UTC+4:30 (IRDT)

Sarab-e Kalak (Persian: سراب كلك, also Romanized as Sarāb-e Kalak) is a village in Gachi Rural District, Gachi District, Malekshahi County, Ilam Province, Iran. At the 2006 census, its population was 57, in 9 families. The village is populated by Kurds.
