= Mar Barreh =

Mar Barreh ماربره
- Village
- Location within Iran
- Coordinates: 33°32′45″N 46°20′32″E
- Country: Iran
- Province: Ilam
- County: Mehran
- Bakhsh: Salehabad
- Rural District: Hejdandasht

Population (2006)
  - Total: 119
- Time zone: UTC+3:30 (IRST)
  - Summer (DST): UTC+4:30 (IRDT)

Mar Barreh (Persian: ماربره, also Romanized as Mār Barreh and Mār Bereh; also known as Māyereh) is a village in Hejdandasht Rural District, Salehabad District, Mehran County, Ilam Province, Iran. At the 2006 census, its population was 119, in 27 families. The village is populated by Kurds.
