= Gol Gol-e Sofla, Malekshahi =

Gol Gol-e Sofla گل گل سفلي
- Village
- Location within Iran
- Coordinates: 33°27′49″N 46°28′57″E
- Country: Iran
- Province: Ilam
- County: Malekshahi
- Bakhsh: Gachi
- Rural District: Gachi

Population (2006)
  - Total: 140
- Time zone: UTC+3:30 (IRST)
  - Summer (DST): UTC+4:30 (IRDT)

Gol Gol-e Sofla (Persian: گل گل سفلي, also Romanized as Gol Gol-e Soflá and Golgol-e Soflá; also known as Sīrāneh) is a village in Gachi Rural District, Gachi District, Malekshahi County, Ilam Province, Iran. At the 2006 census, its population was 140, in 35 families. The village is populated by Kurds.
