= Taleqani, Ilam =

Taleqani طالقاني
- Village
- Location within Iran
- Coordinates: 33°21′36″N 46°38′00″E
- Country: Iran
- Province: Ilam
- County: Malekshahi
- Bakhsh: Central
- Rural District: Chamzey

Population (2006)
  - Total: 118
- Time zone: UTC+3:30 (IRST)
  - Summer (DST): UTC+4:30 (IRDT)

Taleqani (Persian: طالقاني, also Romanized as Ţāleqānī; also known as Rūstā-ye Ţāleqānī) is a village in Chamzey Rural District, in the Central District of Malekshahi County, Ilam Province, Iran. At the 2006 census, its population was 118, in 26 families. The village is populated by Kurds.
