= Delgosha =

City in Ilam province, Iran

Delgosha Persian: دلگشا
- City
- Location within Iran Location within Ilam Province
- Coordinates: 33°24′21″N 46°35′44″E
- Country: Iran
- Province: Ilam
- County: Malekshahi
- District: Gachi

Population (2016)
  - Total: 1,819
- Time zone: UTC+3:30 (IRST)

Delgosha (Persian: دلگشا) (Note: Also romanized as Delgoshā) is a city in Gachi District of Malekshahi County, Ilam province, Iran. It is adjacent to the city of Arkavaz, (Note: Formerly Qaleh Darreh-ye Malekshahi) bordering it to the south. The city is populated by Kurds.

== Demographics ==
=== Population ===
At the time of the 2006 National Census, Delgosha's population was 3,931 in 676 households, when it was a village in Gachi Rural District of the former Malekshahi District (Note: Formerly Arkavazi District) of Mehran County. The following census in 2011 counted 2,201 people in 551 households, by which time the district had been separated from the county in the establishment of Malekshahi County, and the village had been elevated to the status of a city. Delgosha and the rural district were transferred to the new Gachi District. The 2016 census measured the population of the city as 1,819 people in 510 households.
