= Shahrak-e Chalab =

Shahrak-e Chalab شهرك چالاب
- Village
- Country: Iran
- Province: Ilam
- County: Mehran
- Bakhsh: Central
- Rural District: Mohsen Ab

Population (2006)
  - Total: 1,973
- Time zone: UTC+3:30 (IRST)
  - Summer (DST): UTC+4:30 (IRDT)

Shahrak-e Chalab (Persian: شهرك چالاب, also Romanized as Shahrak-e Chālāb) is a village in Mohsen Ab Rural District, in the Central District of Mehran County, Ilam Province, Iran. At the 2006 census, its population was 1,973, in 451 families.
