= Gol Gol-e Olya, Malekshahi =

Gol Gol-e Olya گل گل عليا
- Village
- Location within Iran
- Coordinates: 33°28′51″N 46°29′25″E
- Country: Iran
- Province: Ilam
- County: Malekshahi
- Bakhsh: Gachi
- Rural District: Gachi

Population (2006)
  - Total: 162
- Time zone: UTC+3:30 (IRST)
  - Summer (DST): UTC+4:30 (IRDT)

Gol Gol-e Olya (Persian: گل گل عليا, also Romanized as Gol Gol-e ‘Olyā and Golgol-e ‘Olyā; also known as Gol Gol) is a village in Gachi Rural District, Gachi District, Malekshahi County, Ilam Province, Iran. At the 2006 census, its population was 162, in 25 families. The village is populated by Kurds.
