= Iran–Iraq border =

International border

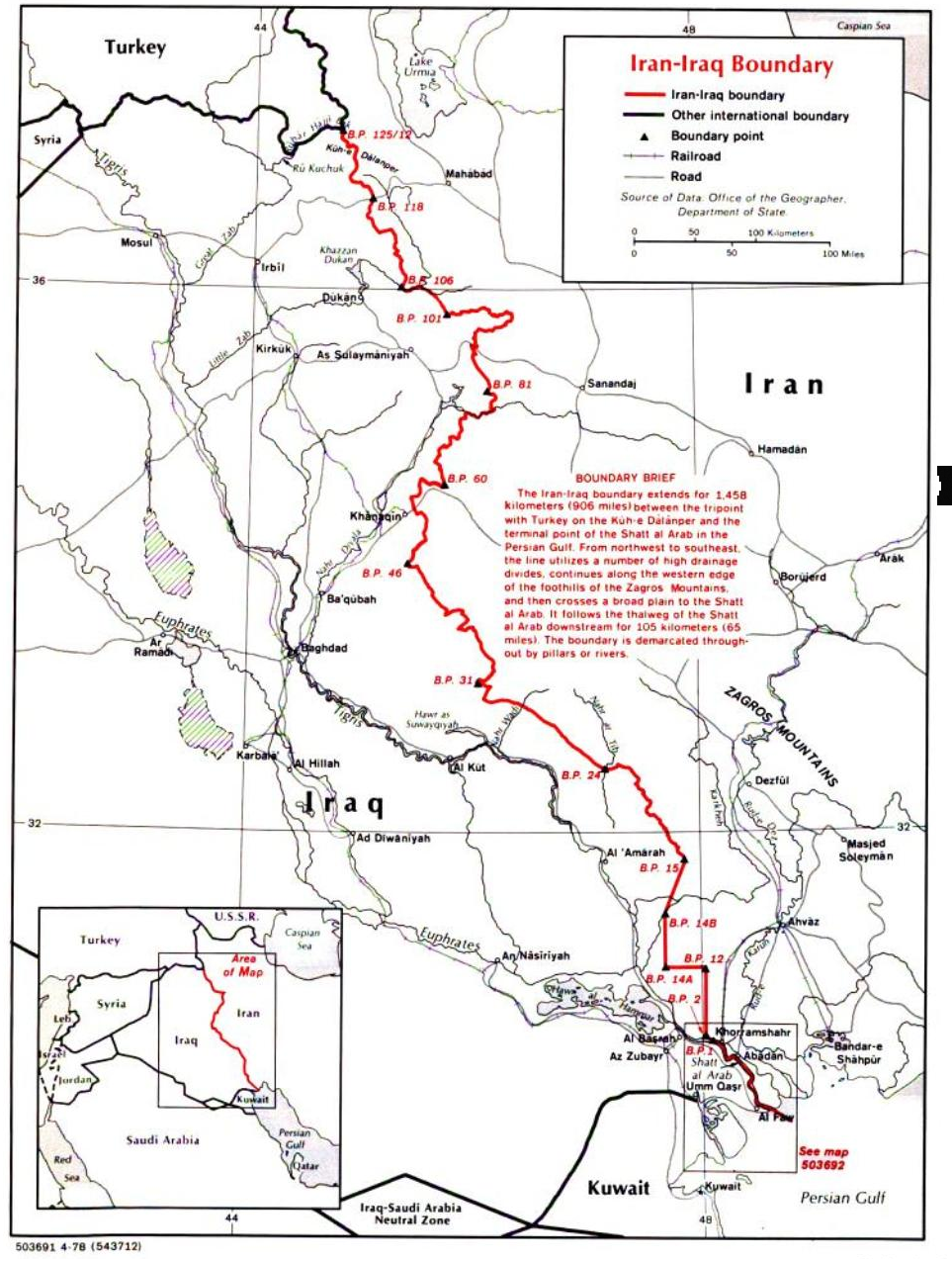
- Map of the Iran–Iraq border

Characteristics
- Entities: Iran; Iraq
- Length: 1,599 km (994 mi)

History
- Established: 1639; Treaty of Zuhab
- Current shape: Ongoing; Disputes over the Shatt al-Arab waterway and minor border adjustments
- Treaties: Treaty of Zuhab (1639), Treaty of Erzurum (1847), Constantinople Protocol (1913), 1975 Algiers Agreement
- Notes: The border has seen numerous disputes, especially over the Shatt al-Arab waterway. The last major conflict occurred during the Iran–Iraq War (1980–1988).

The Iran–Iraq border runs for 1,599 km (994 mi) from the tripoint with Turkey in the north down to the Shatt al-Arab (known as Arvand River in Iran) waterway and out to the Persian Gulf in the south. Although the boundary was first determined in 1639, certain disputes continue, particularly surrounding navigation on the Shatt al-Arab.

== Boundary line ==
The border starts in the north at the Turkish tripoint (at 37° 08' 44" N and 44° 47' 05" E). It then proceeds southwards via a series of irregular lines through the Zagros Mountains, trending broadly to the south-east, save for short stretches where it utilises rivers (such as the Zab as Saghir and Diyala River) and a protrusion of Iraqi territory east of Sulaymaniyah in Penjwen District. To the east of Al Amarah the irregular lines cease, and the border continues southward via four straight-line sections through marshland down to the Nahr al-Khayin river. The border follows this river briefly down to the Shatt al-Arab, the thalweg of which it then follows out to the Persian Gulf at the "lowest point of low water" at the mouth of the Shatt al-Arab at 29°51′16″N 48°44′45″E (WGS84).

== History ==
=== Ottoman era (1500s–1920) ===
The Ottoman Empire had conquered much of Ottoman Iraq from Safavid Persia in the Ottoman–Safavid War of 1532–1555. The war concluded with the Peace of Amasya, by which Ottoman rule over Mesopotamia was confirmed. Ottoman control of Mesopotamia was strengthened following the Ottoman–Safavid War (1623–1639), which was ended by the Treaty of Zuhab. The Zuhab treaty stipulated that the boundary between the two empires would run between the Zagros Mountains and the Tigris River, though a precise line was not drawn at that time.

During the Ottoman–Hotaki War (1722–1727) the Ottomans invaded Iran in league with Russia, gaining large parts of north-west Iran via the Treaty of Hamedan. Another war followed in the 1740s which was ended by the Treaty of Kerden in 1746, which restored Iran's western provinces and re-affirmed the 1639 Zuhab border.

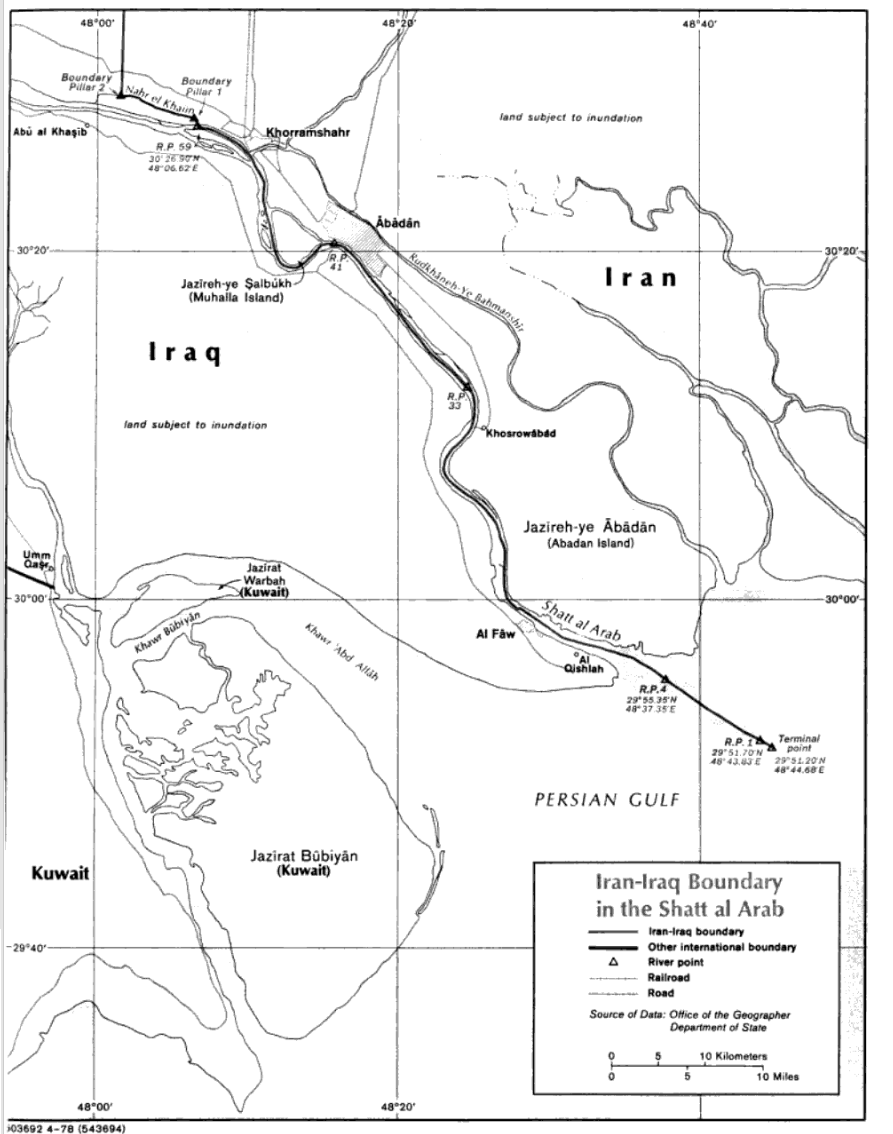
Detailed map of the border in the Shatt al-Arab

The Ottoman–Persian War (1821–1823) ended with the signing of the First Treaty of Erzurum, which re-affirmed the 1639 Zuhab border. A boundary commission involving Iranian, Ottoman, Russian and British officials assisted with the boundary delimitation, resulting in the Second Treaty of Erzurum of 1847 which affirmed the 1639 border with some small modifications. The new treaty first raised the issue of the Shatt al-Arab waterway; the boundary was set at the eastern bank of the river so that the entire waterway remained under Ottoman control, whilst allowing that “Persian vessels shall have the right to navigate freely without let or hindrance”. The four-way boundary commission resumed its work in the following years, and after much work and cartographic disputation a detailed map was produced in 1869.

Despite the work of the commission, disputes concerning the precise boundary alignment continued. The Ottomans and Iran agreed to work on a more precise demarcation in 1911 at the urging of Russia and the Britain, both of whom had colonial aspirations in the region. From November 1913-October 1914 a boundary commission established the Constantinople Protocol, providing a detailed delimitation of the entire boundary, and also confirmed Ottoman control of the Shatt al-Arab. In general, the line was to follow the east bank of the waterway except in the region surrounding the Iranian town of Khorramshahr, where it was to follow the thalweg. The four-nation boundary commission then surveyed the border on the ground and demarcated it with pillars, producing a detailed series of map depicting the confirmed frontier.

=== Colonial and independent Iraq (1920–present) ===
During the First World War the Arab Revolt, supported by Britain, succeeded in removing the Ottomans from most of the Middle East. As a result of the secret 1916 Anglo-French Sykes–Picot Agreement Britain gained control of the Ottoman Vilayets of Mosul, Baghdad and Basra, which it organised into the mandate of Iraq in 1920. The former Ottoman-Iran boundary was retained, now forming the borders between Iran and Iraq, and also Iran and the new Republic of Turkey established in 1923. Iraq later gained independence in 1932.

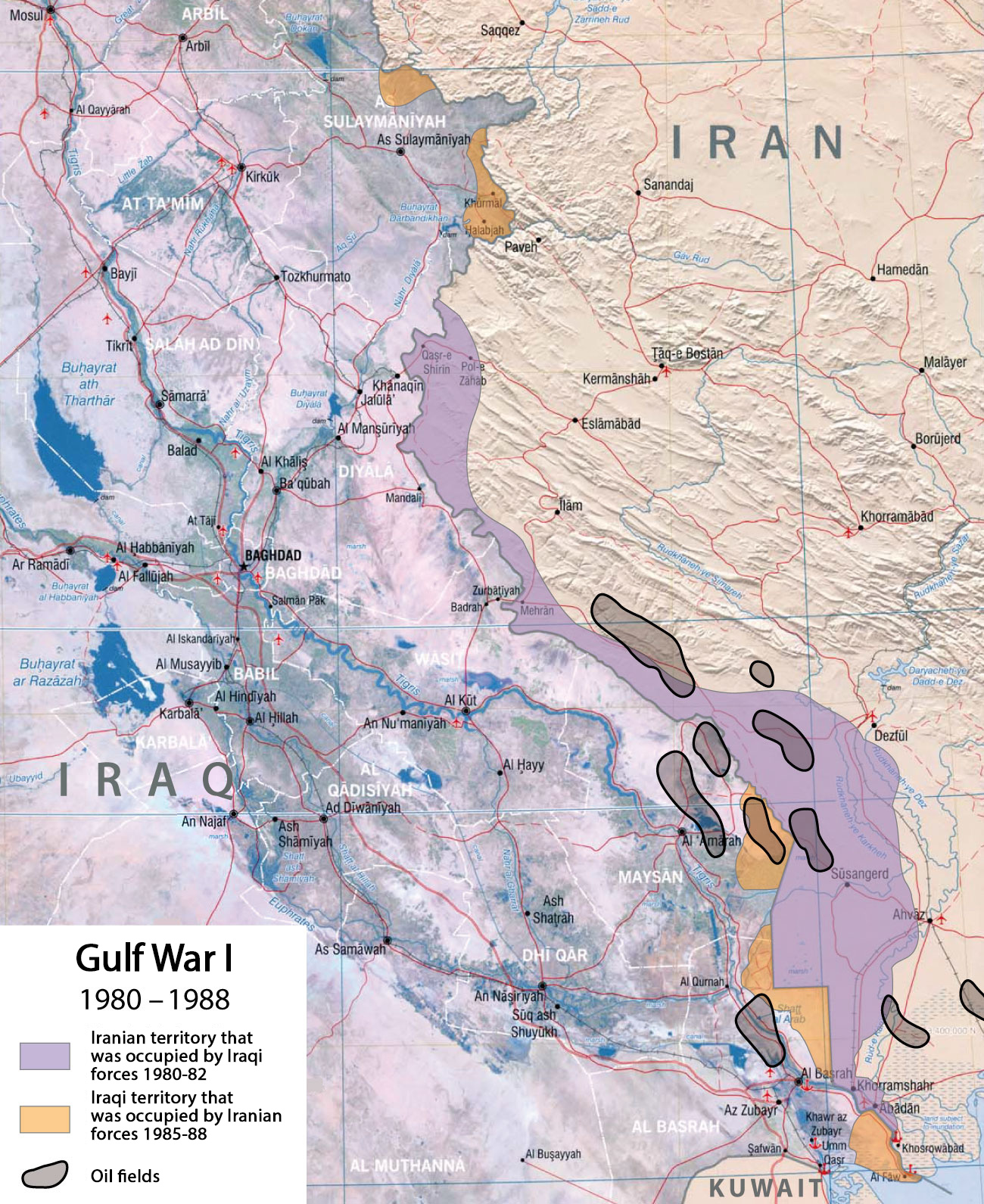
Map showing the major areas of fighting during the Iran–Iraq War (1980–1988)

The border was challenged by Iran in 1934 at the League of Nations, with the validity of both the Treaty of Erzurum and the Constantinople Protocol being called into question. The dispute was resolved in 1937, following the general lines of the old boundary, with the exception of the area immediately around the Iranian town of Abadan, where the boundary was moved from the east bank to the thalweg, as had been done around Khorramshahr two decades earlier.

While that resolved Iran's major grievances, it failed to respond to the issue of freedom of navigation in the Shatt al-Arab. The issue rumbled on in the following decades, with Iraq adopting a more assertive foreign policy in the 1970s following the rise of Saddam Hussein. In 1969 Iran abrogated the 1937 treaty, resulting in the 1974–75 Shatt al-Arab conflict with Iraq on the Shatt al-Arab. In retaliation Iraq supported Arab separatists in Iran's oil-rich Khuzestan province, with Iran supporting Kurdish rebels in Iraq. A peace agreement was signed on 6 March 1975 in Algiers in which both parties pledged to further demarcate the border, both on land and in the Shatt al-Arab, based upon the Erzurum Treaty and Constantinople Protocol. A further treaty was signed in Baghdad that year, confirming the Algiers provisions, along with maps marking the border.

Relations soured once again in 1979, as Saddam Hussein formally took office and the Shah of Iran was overthrown in the Islamic Revolution and replaced by a Shi'ite theocracy under Ayatollah Ruhollah Khomeini. War broke out in 1980 when Iraq invaded Iran, leading to the eight-year long Iran–Iraq War. Almost the entire ground war was fought in close proximity to the international boundary, though the conflict resulted in stalemate and following the end of fighting no changes to the border were made. Relations were restored in 1990 and have improved substantially since the overthrow of Saddam Hussein in 2003.

== Settlements near the border ==
=== Iran ===
- Piranshahr
- Sardasht
- Maraghan
- Alut
- Baneh
- Qohabad
- Nanur
- Qamishaleh
- Sadabad
- Marivan
- Hani Garmaleh
- Nowdesheh
- Marrehkhel
- Kheyli Mara
- Sumar
- Tappeh Maran
- Qasr-e Shirin
- Naft shahr
- Pasgah-e Meyan Tang
- Sar Ney
- Salehabad
- Mehran
- Dobrij
- Khorramshahr
- Abadan
- Shalamcheh

=== Iraq ===
- Qaladiza
- Tutkan
- Kani Spika
- Said Sadiq
- Halabja
- Sazan
- Girdanawe
- Hajilar
- Qoratu
- Khanaqin
- Makatu
- Mandali
- Ney Khezer
- Zurbatiyah
- Badra
- Al Qurnah
- Basra
- Al-Faw

== Border crossings ==
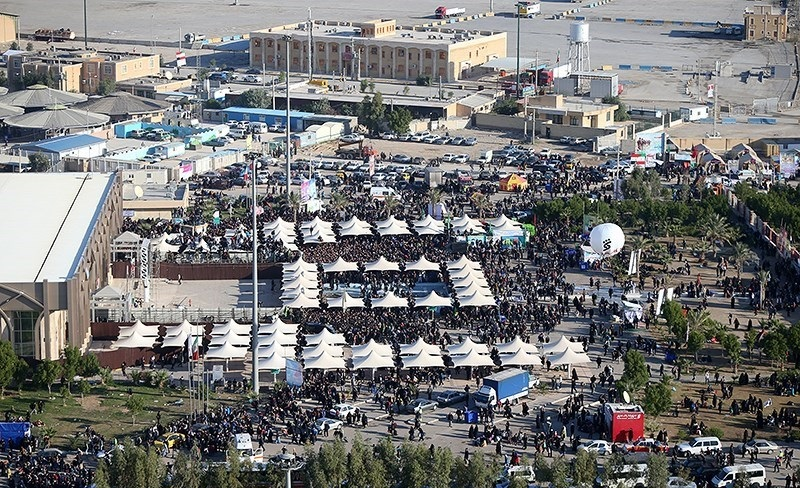
An Iran-Iraq border crossing in Mehran in 2015

There are multiple border crossings between Iran and Iraq, with separate crossings for Iraqi Kurdistan and the rest of Iraq. Below is the organization of these crossings:

=== Border crossings with Iraqi Kurdistan ===
These border crossings link Iran to the autonomous region of Iraqi Kurdistan:

- Parviz border (Sulaymaniyah Governorate, Kermanshah Province)
- Haji Omeran (Erbil Governorate)
- Bashmaq (Kurdistan Province/Sulaymaniyah Governorate)
- Sayran Ban (Penjwen district, Sulaymaniyah Governorate, from 2016)

=== Border crossings with the rest of Iraq ===
These border crossings connect Iran with the rest of Iraq:

- Khosravi/Manzarieh
- Mehran/Zurbatiyah
- Chazabeh/Al Shaib
- Shalamcheh
- Soomar/Mandali

=== Security measures ===
In 2023, the Iraqi government was working on the construction of 47 security installations along its border with Iran.

== See also ==
- Al-Fakkah Field - disputed oil field on the border
- Iran–Iraq relations
- Iran–Turkey border
- Iraq–Turkey border
- Iraq–Kuwait border
