= Menar =

Menar (Persian: منار) may refer to:

- Menar, Ilam
- Menar, Khuzestan
- Menar, Lorestan

== See also ==
- Minar (disambiguation)
