= Bustaneh, Malekshahi =

Bustaneh بوستانه
- Village
- Location within Iran
- Coordinates: 32°58′47″N 46°57′25″E
- Country: Iran
- Province: Ilam
- County: Malekshahi
- Bakhsh: Gachi
- Rural District: Gachi

Population (2006)
  - Total: 474
- Time zone: UTC+3:30 (IRST)
  - Summer (DST): UTC+4:30 (IRDT)

Bustaneh (Persian: بوستانه, also Romanized as Būstāneh) is a village in Gachi Rural District, Gachi District, Malekshahi County, Ilam Province, Iran. At the 2006 census, its population was 474, in 66 families. The village is populated by Kurds.
