= Anjir, Iran =

Anjir انجير
- Village
- Location within Iran
- Coordinates: 33°25′01″N 46°25′33″E
- Country: Iran
- Province: Ilam
- County: Malekshahi
- Bakhsh: Gachi
- Rural District: Gachi

Population (2006)
  - Total: 807
- Time zone: UTC+3:30 (IRST)
  - Summer (DST): UTC+4:30 (IRDT)

Anjir (Persian: انجير, also Romanized as Anjīr) is a village in Gachi Rural District, Gachi District, Malekshahi County, Ilam Province, Iran. At the 2006 census, its population was 807, in 100 families. The village is populated by Kurds.
