= Shahrak-e Eslamiyeh =

Village in Ilam province, Iran

Shahrak-e Eslamiyeh Persian: شهرك اسلاميه
- Village
- Location within Iran Location within Ilam Province
- Coordinates: 33°05′39″N 46°17′05″E
- Country: Iran
- Province: Ilam
- County: Mehran
- District: Central
- Rural District: Mohsenab

Population (2016)
  - Total: 3,349
- Time zone: UTC+3:30 (IRST)

Shahrak-e Eslamiyeh (Persian: شهرك اسلاميه) (Note: Also romanized as Shahrak-e Eslāmīyeh) is a village in, and the capital of, Mohsenab Rural District of the Central District of Mehran County, Ilam province, Iran.

== Demographics ==
=== Ethnicity ===
The village is populated by Kurds.

=== Population ===
At the time of the 2006 National Census, the village's population was 2,477 in 520 households. The following census in 2011 counted 3,391 people in 830 households. The 2016 census measured the population of the village as 3,349 people in 920 households. It was the most populous village in its rural district.
