= Mian Tang =

Mian Tang or Mian-i-Tang or Meyan Tang (Persian: ميان تنگ) may refer to:

- Mian Tang, Ilam
- Mian Tang, Kermanshah
- Miantang (disambiguation)
