= Kabirkuh Rural District =

Rural district in Ilam province, Iran

Kabirkuh Rural District Persian: دهستان کبیرکوه
- Rural District
- Location within Iran Location within Ilam Province
- Coordinates: 33°25′49″N 46°33′22″E
- Country: Iran
- Province: Ilam
- County: Malekshahi
- District: Gachi
- Capital: Qaleh Juq

Population (2016)
  - Total: 2,210
- Time zone: UTC+3:30 (IRST)

Kabirkuh Rural District (Persian: دهستان کبیرکوه) is in Gachi District of Malekshahi County, Ilam province, Iran. Its capital is the village of Qaleh Juq.

== History ==
In 2008, Malekshahi District (Note: Formerly Arkavazi District) was separated from Mehran County in the establishment of Malekshahi County, and Kabirkuh Rural District was created in the new Gachi District.

== Demographics ==
=== Population ===
At the time of the 2011 National Census, the rural district's population was 2,086 inhabitants in 517 households. The 2016 census measured the population of the rural district as 2,210 in 576 households. The most populous of its 13 villages was Qaleh Juq, with 1,468 people.
