= Siab =

Siab or SIAB may refer to:

- Ship in a bottle, a type of impossible bottle
- Siab-e Darvish (also Sīāb), a village in Gachi Rural District, Malekshahi County, Ilam Province, Iran
- Sirab (also Siab), a village and municipality in the Babek Rayon of Nakhchivan, Azerbaijan
- SIAB: Shell in a Box, Web-based SSH
- SIAB, a Romanian acronym for the Bucharest International Auto Show
- SIAB, an abbreviation for the sodium-ion aqueous battery
- SIAB (company), a former Swedish construction company Svenska Industribyggen AB
- Schools International Athletic Board, a British organization hosting sport of athletics meetings for young athletes
