= Mian Tang, Ilam =

Mian Tang ميان تنگ
- Village
- Location within Iran
- Coordinates: 33°21′40″N 46°35′32″E
- Country: Iran
- Province: Ilam
- County: Malekshahi
- Bakhsh: Central
- Rural District: Chamzey

Population (2006)
  - Total: 222
- Time zone: UTC+3:30 (IRST)
  - Summer (DST): UTC+4:30 (IRDT)

Mian Tang (Persian: ميان تنگ, also Romanized as Mīān Tang; also known as Kānī Keh) is a village in Chamzey Rural District, in the Central District of Malekshahi County, Ilam Province, Iran. At the 2006 census, its population was 222, in 47 families. The village is populated by Kurds.
