= Naderabad, Ilam =

Naderabad نادراباد
- Village
- Location within Iran
- Coordinates: 33°15′50″N 46°49′21″E
- Country: Iran
- Province: Ilam
- County: Malekshahi
- Bakhsh: Central
- Rural District: Shuhan

Population (2006)
  - Total: 149
- Time zone: UTC+3:30 (IRST)
  - Summer (DST): UTC+4:30 (IRDT)

Naderabad (Persian: نادراباد, also Romanized as Nāderābād; also known as Nāderābād-e Showhān) is a village in Shuhan Rural District, in the Central District of Malekshahi County, Ilam Province, Iran. At the 2006 census, its population was 149, in 28 families. The village is populated by Lurs.
