= Siab-e Darvish =

Siab-e Darvish سيابدرويش
- Village
- Location within Iran
- Coordinates: 33°20′38″N 46°27′58″E
- Country: Iran
- Province: Ilam
- County: Malekshahi
- Bakhsh: Gachi
- Rural District: Gachi

Population (2006)
  - Total: 94
- Time zone: UTC+3:30 (IRST)
  - Summer (DST): UTC+4:30 (IRDT)

Siab-e Darvish (Persian: سيابدرويش, also Romanized as Sīāb-e Darvīsh; also known as Sīāb and Sīyāb) is a village in Gachi Rural District, Gachi District, Malekshahi County, Ilam Province, Iran. At the 2006 census, its population was 94, in 15 families. The village is populated by Kurds.
