= Golan, Ilam =

Village in Ilam province, Iran

Golan Persian: گلان
- Village
- Location within Iran Location within Ilam Province
- Coordinates: 33°25′04″N 46°15′51″E
- Country: Iran
- Province: Ilam
- County: Mehran
- District: Salehabad
- Rural District: Hejdandasht

Population (2016)
  - Total: 986
- Time zone: UTC+3:30 (IRST)

Golan (Persian: گلان) (Note: Also romanized as Golān and Gūlān) is a village in Hejdandasht Rural District of Salehabad District, Mehran County, Ilam province, Iran.

== Demographics ==
=== Ethnicity ===
The village is populated by Kurds.

=== Population ===
At the time of the 2006 National Census, the village's population was 1,010 in 194 households. The following census in 2011 counted 923 people in 228 households. The 2016 census measured the population of the village as 986 people in 290 households. It was the most populous village in its rural district.
