= Anjirestan =

Anjirestan (Persian: انجيرستان) may refer to:

- Anjirestan, Kerman
- Anjirestan, Izeh, Khuzestan Province
