= Sar Ney =

Sar Ney سرني
- Village
- Location within Iran
- Coordinates: 33°34′08″N 46°06′24″E
- Country: Iran
- Province: Ilam
- County: Mehran
- Bakhsh: Salehabad
- Rural District: Hejdandasht

Population (2006)
  - Total: 21
- Time zone: UTC+3:30 (IRST)
  - Summer (DST): UTC+4:30 (IRDT)

Sar Ney (Persian: سرني) is a village in Hejdandasht Rural District, Salehabad District, Mehran County, Ilam Province, Iran. At the 2006 census, its population was 21, in 4 families. The village is populated by Kurds.
