= Menar-e Balutestan =

Menar-e Balutestan مناربلوطستان
- Village
- Country: Iran
- Province: Ilam
- County: Malekshahi
- Bakhsh: Central
- Rural District: Shuhan

Population (2006)
  - Total: 179
- Time zone: UTC+3:30 (IRST)
  - Summer (DST): UTC+4:30 (IRDT)

Menar-e Balutestan (Persian: مناربلوطستان, also Romanized as Menār-e Balūṭestān) is a village in Shuhan Rural District, in the Central District of Malekshahi County, Ilam Province, Iran. At the 2006 census, its population was 179, in 30 families. The village is populated by Lurs.
