= Vehicle registration plates of Ilam =

Ilam vehicle license plates

Ilami code is 98. In public cars, Taxis and Governal cars the letter is always the same. But in simple cars this letter (ب) depends on the city.

۱۲ ۳۴۵	۹۸

City	Letter
Ilam	ب-ج-د-س
Mehran; Malekshahi	ص
Darrehshahr	ط
Dehloran	ق
Shirvan va Chardavol	ل
Ivan	م
Abdanan	ن
