= Rika, Ilam =

Village in Ilam province, Iran

Rika Persian: ريكا
- Village
- Location within Iran Location within Ilam Province
- Coordinates: 33°30′10″N 46°10′32″E
- Country: Iran
- Province: Ilam
- County: Mehran
- District: Salehabad
- Rural District: Hejdandasht

Population (2016)
  - Total: 348
- Time zone: UTC+3:30 (IRST)

Rika (Persian: ريكا) (Note: Also romanized as Rīkā) is a village in, and the capital of, Hejdandasht Rural District of Salehabad District, Mehran County, Ilam province, Iran.

== Demographics ==
=== Ethnicity ===
The village is populated by Kurds.

=== Population ===
At the time of the 2006 National Census, the village's population was 373 in 79 households. The following census in 2011 counted 341 people in 82 households. The 2016 census measured the population of the village as 348 people in 97 households.
