= Minar =

Minar may refer to:

- Minar (Firuzabad), a structure in Iran
- Minar, an alternative form of minaret

== People ==
- Minar Rahman (born 1992), Bangladeshi singer-songwriter
- Minář, surname

== See also ==
- Menar (disambiguation)
