= Chazi =

Chazi may refer to:

- Chazi, Iran
- Cazê, Tibet
