= Selahabad District =

Selahabad District may refer to:

- Salehabad District (Ilam Province)
- Salehabad District (Razavi Khorasan Province)
