= Bustaneh =

Bustaneh (Persian: بوستانه) may refer to:

- Bustaneh, Hormozgan
- Bustaneh, Malekshahi, Ilam Province
