= Killing of Latif Karimi =

Retired brigadier general (died 2026)

Latif Karimi (Persian: لطیف کریمی) was an Iranian citizen and a retired Colonel of the Islamic Revolutionary Guard Corps. During the 2025–2026 Iranian protests (Dey 1404), he was shot and killed on 3 January 2026 (13 Dey 1404) in Malekshahi County, in Ilam Province, after being struck by live ammunition fired by agents of the Islamic Republic of Iran. His son confirmed on his personal social media page that Karimi was killed directly by government forces. Following the incident, state-affiliated institutions promoted media narratives describing him as a member of government forces who had been killed by protesters.

== Background ==
Starting on 28 December 2025, widespread protests erupted across Iran amid a deepening economic crisis and growing public frustration with government corruption, and demands for the end of the regime. The protests were Initially triggered by soaring inflation, skyrocketing food prices, and the Iranian rial's sharp depreciation, but quickly expanded into a broader movement demanding political change and the end of the Islamic Republic, with slogans like "Death to the Dictator", referring to supreme leader Ali Khamenei, and "Long live the Shah", referring to Reza Pahlavi. The demonstrations began in Tehran's Grand Bazaar, and spread to universities and major cities including Isfahan, Shiraz, and Mashhad, drawing students and merchants alike, many of whom cited government corruption, mismanagement, and prioritization of foreign conflicts over domestic needs as major grievances. The economic crisis, worsened by the 2025 conflict with Israel, reimposed UN sanctions, chronic inflation (42.2% in December), and food and health price surges of 50-72%, left merchants struggling to trade and households struggling to survive. Calls for reform grew alongside outrage over energy shortages, water crises, and civil rights abuses, and by early January 2026, dozens of protesters had been arrested, with reports of security forces firing live ammunition directly at demonstrators.

== Life ==
Latif Karimi (Persian: لطیف کریمی) was a Kurdish citizen from Malekshahi County, in Ilam Province, Iran. He was a retired brigadier general of the Islamic Revolutionary Guard Corps. Following his retirement, he lived in Malekshahi, where he participated in public protests in the city in January 2026.

== Death ==
During the 2025–2026 Iranian protests, Karimi was killed on 3 January 2026 (13 Dey 1404) in a protest that was taking place in Malekshahi. According to reports by the Hengaw Organization for Human Rights and statements from informed sources and eyewitnesses, Karimi was among the protesters when members of the Islamic Revolutionary Guard Corps opened fire, and he was struck by live ammunition. Reports stated that Karimi was specifically targeted by the shooters. He was transferred to Imam Khomeini Hospital in Ilam, where he later succumbed to his injuries.

Following his death, state-affiliated media published reports describing Karimi as a member of government forces who had been killed in clashes with protesters. His son, Emad Karimi, stated on his personal social media account that his father had been killed directly by government forces and wrote that he had urged those present not to shoot. Additionally, witness accounts cited by Hengaw also disputed the official narrative and reported that Karimi was participating in the protests when he was shot. Similar media portrayals were reported in other protest-related deaths during the same period, including those of Amir Hossam Khodayarifard and Ali Azizi.

== See also ==
- Deaths during the 2025–2026 Iranian protests
- 2025–2026 Iranian protests
