= Leyla Qasim =

Feyli Kurdish activist

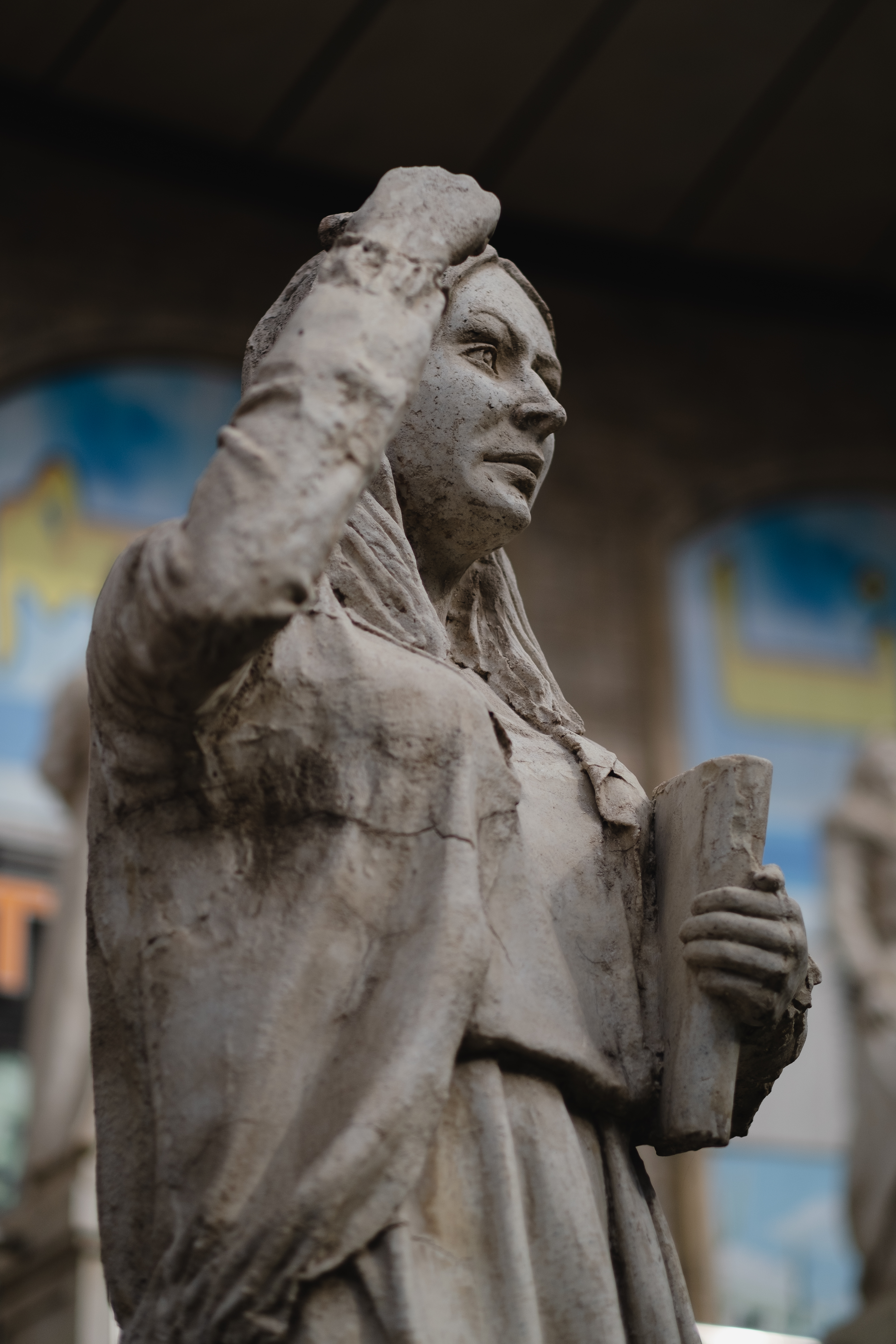
- Statue of Leyla Qasim in Downtown Erbil
- Born: 1952; Khanaqin, Kingdom of Iraq
- Died: 12 May 1974 (aged 21/22); Baghdad, Ba'athist Iraq
- Cause of death: Execution by hanging
- Other name: Bride of Kurdistan
- Known for: Pro-Kurdish political activism, execution by Iraqi Ba'ath party

Leyla Qasim (Kurdish: Leyla Qasim ,لەیلا قاسم; 1952 – 12 May 1974) was a Feyli Kurdish activist against the Iraqi Ba'ath regime who was executed in Baghdad. She is known as a national martyr among the Kurds.

== Birth and childhood ==
She was the third out of five children born to a Dalahu Qasim, a farmer, and his wife Kani, in the village of Masfa in Khanaqin. They were a Kurdish family from the Malekshahi tribe. Her family relocated to Erbil when she was four years old.

== Education ==
Leyla and her brother Çiyako were taught Arabic and agriculture by their mother when they were aged six and eight. In 1958 she entered elementary and later finished secondary school in Khanaqin. In 1971 she moved to Baghdad to study sociology at the University of Baghdad.

== Political activism ==
Leyla Qasim was sixteen years old as Abdul Rahman Arif was overthrown by Ba'ath party leader, General Ahmed Hassan al-Bakr in 1968. Leyla was disturbed by the violent takeover in the capital. During the late 1960s, Leyla and Çiyako wrote pamphlets on the horrors of the Ba'ath party including the new leader, Saddam Hussein, whom they described as being against Kurdish independence.

Leyla spoke to several Kurds in the Kurdistan Region about the Ba'ath regime and the loose morals of the members. Leyla was told that her words were inspiring sedition.

In 1970 she joined the Kurdistan Students Union and the Kurdistan Democratic Party.

On 28 April 1974 she was detained together with four others and accused of attempting to hijack a plane. She was arrested, tortured and, in Baghdad on 12 May 1974, ultimately hanged after a show trial, broadcast throughout Iraq. She was accused of having planned to kill Saddam Hussein. She was the first woman to be hanged by the Iraqi Ba'ath party. Executed along with Qasim were also Jawad Hamawandi, Nariman Fuad Masti, Hassan Hama Rashid and Azad Sleman Miran. Leyla Qasim’s final request was reportedly for a set of Kurdish clothes to be brought to her prison cell, so she could wear them at her execution. She would become known as the “Bride of Kurdistan”. She was the first woman to be executed in Iraq’s history.

== Remembrance ==
Many Kurdish families named their children Leyla after her. Every year the anniversary of her death is remembered by many Kurds. In Kelar there exists a Leyla Qasim Park and a statue of her in Xaneqîn.
