= Malekshahi (tribe) =

Kurdish tribe in Iran and Iraq

Malekshahi (Kurdish: مەڵگشای, Mełigşay) is a Kurdish tribe found in the borderlands between Iran and Iraq. The tribe speaks Southern Kurdish.

== History ==
The Malekshahi tribe was one of the Kurdish tribes native to the region around Ilam province, Iran. The Malekshahi mainly lived in the provinces of Ilam province in Iran, and Diyala Governorate, Wasit Governorate and Baghdad Governorate in Iraq. The Malekshahi was considered one of the main tribes of Ilam. There was a theory that the tribe were natives of a region around Ilam named Arkavaz (from "arak" meaning "capital" and "vaz" meaning "wide"), and that during the reign of the Seljuk sultan Malik-Shah I, the governor of the Arkavaz region renamed the region to Malekshahi after the sultan, after which the natives of the region were also called Malekshahi. The historical region of Arkavaz, also known as Arkavaz-e-Malekshahi, later became the Malekshahi County of Ilam province.

There was an unrelated tribe also called Malekshahi but more commonly Malkishi, which historically lived in the Emirate of Çemişgezek.

The Malekshahi tribe speaks the Malekshahi dialect of Feyli, also known as Ilami, which is a dialect of Southern Kurdish. The main clans within the Malekshahi tribe were the Khamis, Qaytol Qaytas, Qaytol Gachi, Hosseynbegi, Shakarbegi, Khalilwand, Chashmaadina, Jomeh, Alinazar, Kolegah, Baveh, Shahremir, Kazembegi, Garawandi, Kanariwand, Naqi, Dusageh, Kolehwand, Khalaf, Khairsha, Kuki, Duqorseh, Rasulwand, Rusageh, Kolkol, Bawlik, Milehga, Siyehga, Khwadag (Khodadad), Kugir (Kabekgir), Kharzinewand, and Gulan. The tribes of Panjasetun and Melkhatawi were also part of the Malekshahi.

Among the famous historical leaders of the Malekshahi tribe were Musa Khan Garzinvand and Shah Mohammad Yari. Leyla Qasim was also from the tribe. The tribe intensely resisted the Iraqi invaders in Ilam province during the Iran-Iraq war. The Malekshahi tribe gained significant attention for their role during the 2025–2026 Iranian protests, and they were the main victims of the 2026 Malekshahi massacre.
