= Naderabad, Chaharmahal and Bakhtiari =

Naderabad نادراباد
- Village
- Location within Iran
- Coordinates: 32°23′48″N 50°22′09″E
- Country: Iran
- Province: Chaharmahal and Bakhtiari
- County: Kuhrang
- Bakhsh: Central
- Rural District: Dasht-e Zarrin

Population (2006)
  - Total: 124
- Time zone: UTC+3:30 (IRST)
  - Summer (DST): UTC+4:30 (IRDT)

Naderabad (Persian: نادراباد, also Romanized as Nāderābād) is a village in Dasht-e Zarrin Rural District, in the Central District of Kuhrang County, Chaharmahal and Bakhtiari Province, Iran. At the 2006 census, its population was 124, in 19 families. The village is populated by Lurs.
