= Anjir Mehi =

Anjir Mehi انجيرمهي
- Village
- Location within Iran
- Coordinates: 28°39′22″N 60°52′42″E
- Country: Iran
- Province: Sistan and Baluchestan
- County: Khash
- Bakhsh: Nukabad
- Rural District: Eskelabad

Population (2006)
  - Total: 88
- Time zone: UTC+3:30 (IRST)
  - Summer (DST): UTC+4:30 (IRDT)

Anjir Mehi (Persian: انجيرمهي, also Romanized as Anjīr Mehī) is a village in Eskelabad Rural District, Nukabad District, Khash County, Sistan and Baluchestan Province, Iran. At the 2006 census, its population was 88, in 33 families.
