= Minář =

Minář (feminine: Minářová) is a Czech surname. It is a dialectical form of the word mlynář, i.e. 'miller'. Notable people with the surname include:

- Ivo Minář (born 1984), Czech tennis player
- Jan Minář (born 1981), Czech tennis player
- Ladislav Minář (born 1969), Czech football manager
- Thomas J. Minar, American academic administrator
