= Miantang-e Sofla =

Miantang-e Sofla ميان تنگسفلي
- Village
- Location within Iran
- Coordinates: 34°15′13″N 47°48′10″E
- Country: Iran
- Province: Lorestan
- County: Delfan
- Bakhsh: Kakavand
- Rural District: Kakavand-e Sharqi

Population (2006)
  - Total: 102
- Time zone: UTC+3:30 (IRST)
  - Summer (DST): UTC+4:30 (IRDT)

Miantang-e Sofla (Persian: ميان تنگسفلي, also Romanized as Mīāntang-e Soflá) is a village in Kakavand-e Sharqi Rural District, Kakavand District, Delfan County, Lorestan Province, Iran. At the 2006 census, its population was 102, in 21 families.
