= Mian Tang, Kermanshah =

Mian Tang ميان تنگ
- Village
- Location within Iran
- Coordinates: 34°19′53″N 46°10′19″E
- Country: Iran
- Province: Kermanshah
- County: Dalahu
- Bakhsh: Central
- Rural District: Howmeh-ye Kerend

Population (2006)
  - Total: 60
- Time zone: UTC+3:30 (IRST)
  - Summer (DST): UTC+4:30 (IRDT)

Mian Tang (Persian: ميان تنگ, also Romanized as Mīān Tang, Meyān Tang, and Miyān-i-Tang; also known as Naotang, Nāv Tang, and Nūtang) is a village in Howmeh-ye Kerend Rural District, in the Central District of Dalahu County, Kermanshah Province, Iran. At the 2006 census, its population was 60, in 13 families.
