= Mehran, Ilam =

City in Ilam province, Iran

Mehran Persian: مهران
- City
- Location within Iran Location within Ilam Province
- Coordinates: 33°07′15″N 46°09′51″E
- Country: Iran
- Province: Ilam
- County: Mehran
- District: Central

Population (2016)
  - Total: 17,435
- Time zone: UTC+3:30 (IRST)

Mehran (Persian: مهران) (Note: Also romanized as Mehrān; formerly Mansurabad (منصورآباد), also romanized as Mansūrābād) is a city in the Central District of Mehran County, Ilam province, Iran, serving as capital of both the county and the district.

Mehran is near Iran's western border with Iraq. Because of its strategic proximity (only two hours' drive from Baghdad) the city has played a continuing role in dealings between Iran and Iraq.

In May 1981, during the Iran–Iraq War, in the Battle of Mehran, Iraqi forces captured Mehran, on the western plain of the Zagros Mountains and pushed eastward to the mountain base. Along with other Iraqi forces, they had been driven out by 1982-83.

== Demographics ==
=== Language and ethnicity ===
The city is mostly populated by Kurds with a small Shohani minority.

Mehran linguistic composition
language	percent
Southern Kurdish	85%
Shohani	15%

=== Population ===
At the time of the 2006 National Census, the city's population was 13,118 in 2,958 households. The following census in 2011 counted 14,920 people in 3,745 households. The 2016 census measured the population of the city as 17,435 people in 5,019 households.

== Climate ==
Mehran has a hot semi-arid climate (Köppen BSh). On July 30 2020 a temperature of 53.5° C (128.3° F) was recorded.

Climate data for Mehran
Month	Jan	Feb	Mar	Apr	May	Jun	Jul	Aug	Sep	Oct	Nov	Dec	Year
Mean daily maximum °C (°F)	15.1 (59.2)	17.5 (63.5)	23.5 (74.3)	29.4 (84.9)	36.5 (97.7)	41.8 (107.2)	44.1 (111.4)	44.3 (111.7)	40.0 (104.0)	33.3 (91.9)	22.6 (72.7)	17.0 (62.6)	30.4 (86.8)
Daily mean °C (°F)	10.2 (50.4)	12.2 (54.0)	17.6 (63.7)	23.4 (74.1)	30.2 (86.4)	35.4 (95.7)	37.8 (100.0)	37.8 (100.0)	33.2 (91.8)	27.0 (80.6)	17.1 (62.8)	12.0 (53.6)	24.5 (76.1)
Mean daily minimum °C (°F)	5.3 (41.5)	6.6 (43.9)	10.8 (51.4)	16.0 (60.8)	22.0 (71.6)	27.3 (81.1)	30.0 (86.0)	29.7 (85.5)	25.3 (77.5)	20.1 (68.2)	11.7 (53.1)	7.2 (45.0)	17.7 (63.8)
Average precipitation mm (inches)	52 (2.0)	39 (1.5)	38 (1.5)	24 (0.9)	6 (0.2)	0 (0)	0 (0)	0 (0)	0 (0)	9 (0.4)	42 (1.7)	46 (1.8)	256 (10)
Average precipitation days (≥ 1.0 mm)	5	4	4	3	1	0	0	0	0	1	3	4	25
Average relative humidity (%)	64	58	37	29	17	12	12	12	15	22	46	60	32
Source: https://en.climate-data.org/asia/iran/ilam/mehran-50574/

== Economy ==
=== Border trade ===
In December 2022 Mehran border market accounts for 23 percent of Iran' total exports to Iraq.

== See also ==
- Qasr-e Shirin
