= Miantang-e Olya =

Miantang-e Olya ميان تنگعليا
- Village
- Location within Iran
- Coordinates: 34°15′22″N 47°48′04″E
- Country: Iran
- Province: Lorestan
- County: Delfan
- Bakhsh: Kakavand
- Rural District: Kakavand-e Sharqi

Population (2006)
  - Total: 68
- Time zone: UTC+3:30 (IRST)
  - Summer (DST): UTC+4:30 (IRDT)

Miantang-e Olya (Persian: ميان تنگعليا, also Romanized as Mīāntang-e ‘Olyā) is a village in Kakavand-e Sharqi Rural District, Kakavand District, Delfan County, Lorestan Province, Iran. At the 2006 census, its population was 68, in 16 families.
