= Miyantang-e Mansuri =

Miyantang-e Mansuri ميان تنگ منصوري
- Village
- Location within Iran
- Coordinates: 33°49′27″N 46°39′36″E
- Country: Iran
- Province: Kermanshah
- County: Eslamabad-e Gharb
- Bakhsh: Homeyl
- Rural District: Mansuri

Population (2006)
  - Total: 189
- Time zone: UTC+3:30 (IRST)
  - Summer (DST): UTC+4:30 (IRDT)

Miyantang-e Mansuri (Persian: ميان تنگ منصوري, also Romanized as Mīyāntang-e Manṣūrī) is a village in Mansuri Rural District, Homeyl District, Eslamabad-e Gharb County, Kermanshah Province, Iran. At the 2006 census, its population was 189, in 45 families.
