= Anjireh, Hormozgan =

Anjireh انجيره
- Village
- Location within Iran
- Coordinates: 26°59′52″N 54°48′23″E
- Country: Iran
- Province: Hormozgan
- County: Bandar Lengeh
- Bakhsh: Central
- Rural District: Mehran

Population (2006)
  - Total: 894
- Time zone: UTC+3:30 (IRST)
  - Summer (DST): UTC+4:30 (IRDT)

Anjireh (Persian: انجيره, also Romanized as Anjīreh; also known as Anjīr) is a village in Mehran Rural District, in the Central District of Bandar Lengeh County, Hormozgan Province, Iran. At the 2006 census, its population was 894, in 140 families.
