= Tappeh Maran =

Tappeh Maran تپه ماران
- Village
- Location within Iran
- Coordinates: 34°35′40″N 45°46′55″E
- Country: Iran
- Province: Kermanshah
- County: Sarpol-e Zahab
- Bakhsh: Central
- Rural District: Dasht-e Zahab

Population (2006)
  - Total: 485
- Time zone: UTC+3:30 (IRST)
  - Summer (DST): UTC+4:30 (IRDT)

Tappeh Maran (Persian: تپه ماران, also Romanized as Tappeh Mārān and Tappeh-ye Mārān) is a village in Dasht-e Zahab Rural District, in the Central District of Sarpol-e Zahab County, Kermanshah Province, Iran. At the 2006 census, its population was 485, in 89 families.
