= Mian Zamin =

Mian Zamin ميان زمين
- Village
- Country: Iran
- Province: Kerman
- County: Rigan
- Bakhsh: Central
- Rural District: Gavkan

Population (2006)
  - Total: 287
- Time zone: UTC+3:30 (IRST)
  - Summer (DST): UTC+4:30 (IRDT)

Mian Zamin (Persian: ميان زمين, also Romanized as Mīān Zamīn; also known as Anjīr-e Zīrakī (Persian: انجيرزيركي)) is a village in Gavkan Rural District, in the Central District of Rigan County, Kerman Province, Iran. At the 2006 census, its population was 287, in 63 families.
