= Salehabad, Ilam =

City in Ilam province, Iran

Salehabad Persian: صالح آباد
- City
- Location within Iran Location within Ilam Province
- Coordinates: 33°28′10″N 46°11′14″E
- Country: Iran
- Province: Ilam
- County: Mehran
- District: Salehabad

Population (2016)
  - Total: 1,751
- Time zone: UTC+3:30 (IRST)

Salehabad (Persian: صالح آباد) (Note: Also romanized as Şāleḩābād) is a city in, and the capital of, Salehabad District of Mehran County, Ilam province, Iran.

== Demographics ==
=== Ethnicity ===
The city is populated by Kurds.

=== Population ===
At the time of the 2006 National Census, the city's population was 1,934 in 399 households. The following census in 2011 counted 1,707 people in 407 households. The 2016 census measured the population of the city as 1,751 people in 447 households.
