= Bucharest International Auto Show =

Auto show in Romania

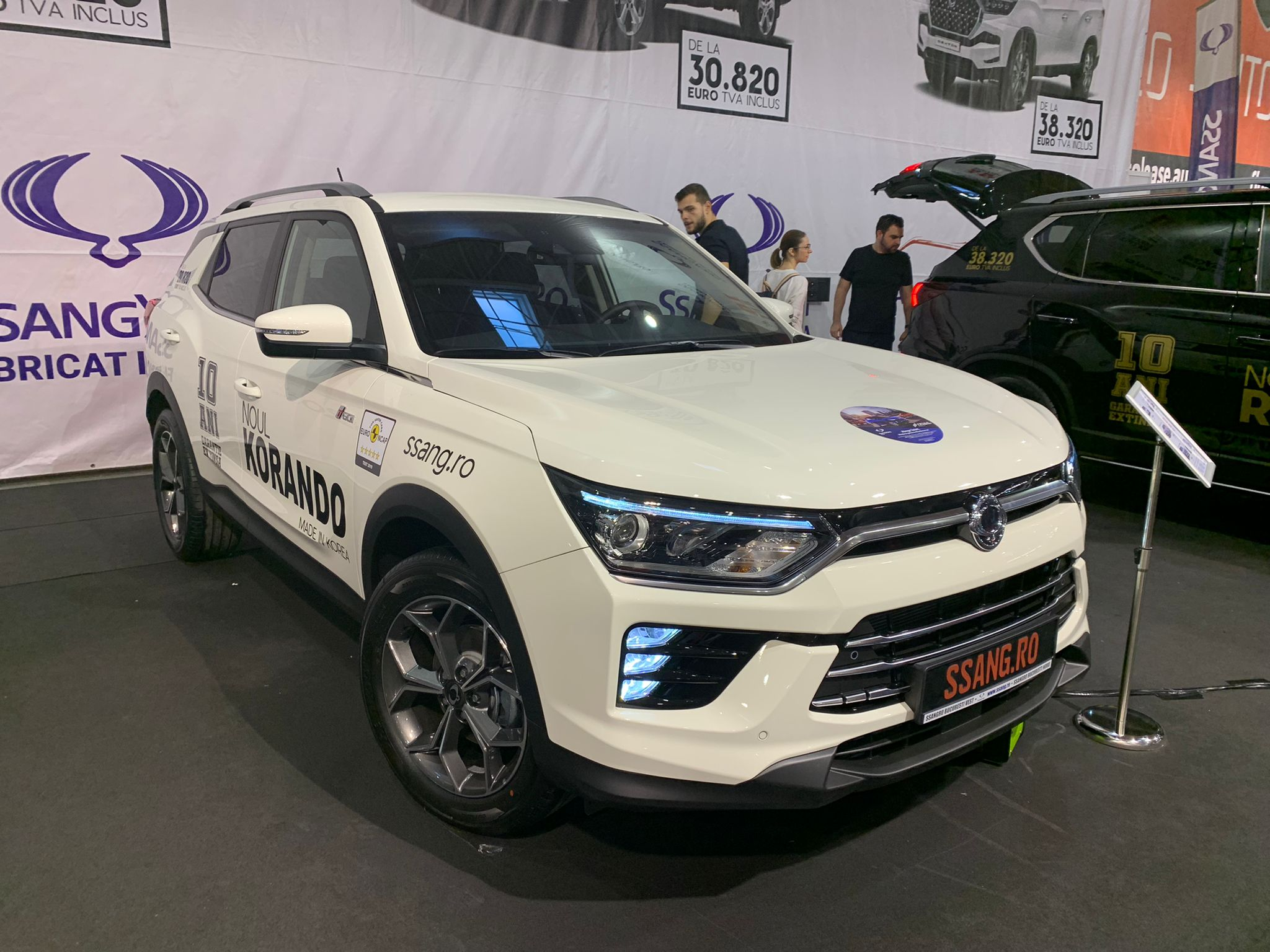
- SsangYong Korando at the 2022 Bucharest International Auto Show
- Genre: Auto show
- Venue: Romexpo
- Location: Bucharest
- Country: Romania
- Inaugurated: 1995
- Most recent: 2022
- Website: www.siab.ro

The Bucharest International Auto Show (Romanian: Salonul Internațional de Automobile București, or just SIAB) is an auto show organized every two years in Romania. The SIAB is conducted over a ten-day period.

== History ==
In 2007, SIAB took place in an area of 50,000 m2, within Romaero Băneasa, and had 250,000 visitors, the same as in 2005. In 2007, ticket sales amounted to over 1.25 million euros, and 3.5 million euros were collected from the rental of exhibitors' stands. The average cost of renting a stand at SIAB 2007 was between 50 and 90 euros per square meter, while the cost of building the stand was 445 euros per square meter.

In 2003, 125 exhibitors participated in an area of 38,000 square meters.

In 2001, during the ten days of the event, there were more than 20,000 visitors every day.

Until 2003, the event was called the Bucharest Auto Show.

The 2009 and 2011 SIAB editions have been cancelled.

After a break of 11 years, a new edition was organized in Bucharest, inaugurated on March 23, 2018, in the Romexpo exhibition spaces, pavilions B1, B2 and B3.
