= Anjirestan, Kerman =

Anjirestan انجيرستان
- Village
- Location within Iran
- Coordinates: 28°52′37″N 57°53′04″E
- Country: Iran
- Province: Kerman
- County: Jiroft
- Bakhsh: Jebalbarez
- Rural District: Maskun

Population (2006)
  - Total: 40
- Time zone: UTC+3:30 (IRST)
  - Summer (DST): UTC+4:30 (IRDT)

Anjirestan (Persian: انجيرستان, also Romanized as Anjīrestān; also known as Anjīr-e Sīgān and Anjīr Sīrkan) is a village in Maskun Rural District, Jebalbarez District, Jiroft County, Kerman Province, Iran. At the 2006 census, its population was 40, consisting of 9 families.
