= Musa Khamis =

Iranian politician

Musa Khamis was an Iranian general in the war between Qajar Empire and the Ottoman Empire in 1821. Also Musa Khamis was a champion in varzesh-e bāstāni and won the Pahlevan of Iran title and armband in Pahlevani traditional wrestling several times.

== Turkish-Persian War (1820–1823) ==
The Ottoman–Qajar War was fought between the Ottoman Empire and Qajar Empire from 1820 to 1823.

The regime of Crown Prince Abbas Mirza launched an attack on Ottoman Turkey under the leadership of Mohammad Ali Mirza Dowlatshah. The war was sparked by Turkish aid to Azerbaijani rebels in Persia. The rebels had fled from Persia and were given refuge by the Ottomans. The war opened with a Persian invasion of Turkey in the Lake Van region, and a counter-invasion by the Ottoman Pasha of Baghdad (Iraq belonged to the Ottoman Empire), who invaded western Persia. This invasion force was driven back across the border, but Dowlatshah's newly modernized army of 30,000 troops defeated 50,000 Ottoman Turks in the Battle of Erzurum near Lake Van in 1821. A peace treaty in 1823 ended the war with no changes to their mutual border. Musa Khamis Persia army general in this war.

In the grounds of the Pars Museum, there are reliefs of commanders present in the battle against the Ottoman Empire and the hero of Musa Khamis Garzdin Vand, the first hero of Iran in the Zandieh to mid-Qajar period and the commander of the Iranian army in the battle against the Ottoman Empire.

The Battle of Erzurum occurred in 1821 as part of the Ottoman-Persian War of 1821–1823. The Persians, led by crown prince Abbas Mirza himself scored a crushing defeat over their Ottoman arch-rivals near Erzurum, securing a Persian victory.

The Persians were heavily outnumbered with 30,000 men, led by Crown Prince Abbas Mirza, against the Turks with 50,000 men. However, the Persian army had recently been undergoing new modernisations according to the most up to date European models, with the leadership of Abbas Mirza's brother, Dowlatshah, as part of the modernising policy known as Nezam-e Jadid.

Mohammad Taqi Khan Sepehr In the writing of history Naskhaltvarykh Sepehr -The History of Sepehr- in the presence of Musa Khamis champion in the army of Prince Dowlatshah wrote her - Prince Mohammed Ali Mirza Dvltshah- days the sun on his head, made the tour of Musa Khamis and of the British teacher English -Officers (armed forces) responsible Jew's-harp and Artillery - house with a group of soldiers and artillery and Znbvrkkhanh ride through the valley seen as hostile and did not retrograde Bfrstad to suddenly become the enemy and fight the army of the testing and data movement and Right and left Direction Over the brow of the hill climb and the soil of independent work hard to seek help and wept. Then came the army. The throes of two top heroes and mouth Saqhbar ball gun and the man's blood ruby and coral species of the soil. Romans (Ottoman) did not hesitate to allow, back to war once they turn away.

Mahmoud Pasha Baban (ruling in force, current Sulaymaniyah) and Sultan Mahmut II, the Ottoman Vizier Mohammad Agha Kahya quickly in the camp fled to Kirkuk and artillery Ottoman prince fell easily into the hands of forces. Mohammad Ali Mirza Dowlatshah went to Sulaymaniyah Abdullah pasha, uncle Lypasha (governor of Diyarbakir time) earlier fled to Iran and he had taken refuge, was appointed to the city by force. It was the beginning of the month of Muharram and the Prince temporarily stopped fighting and remain confidant in Sulaimaniyah. Muharram and reach zero by the end of 1821 and to open up tents outside Baghdad fair division. But he was awaiting death.
