= Chezi-ye Olya =

Chezi-ye Olya چزي عليا
- Village
- Location within Iran
- Coordinates: 32°04′49″N 49°22′59″E
- Country: Iran
- Province: Khuzestan
- County: Andika
- Bakhsh: Abezhdan
- Rural District: Abezhdan

Population (2006)
  - Total: 263
- Time zone: UTC+3:30 (IRST)
  - Summer (DST): UTC+4:30 (IRDT)

Chezi-ye Olya (Persian: چزي عليا, also Romanized as Chezī-ye 'Olyā; also known as Chazī, Chīzī, and Menār) is a village in Abezhdan Rural District, Abezhdan District, Andika County, Khuzestan province, Iran. At the 2006 census, its population was 263, in 47 families.
