= Arkavaz =

City in Ilam province, Iran

Arkavaz Persian: اركواز
- City
- Location within Iran Location within Ilam Province
- Coordinates: 33°23′05″N 46°35′59″E
- Country: Iran
- Province: Ilam
- County: Malekshahi
- District: Central

Population (2016)
  - Total: 11,977
- Time zone: UTC+3:30 (IRST)

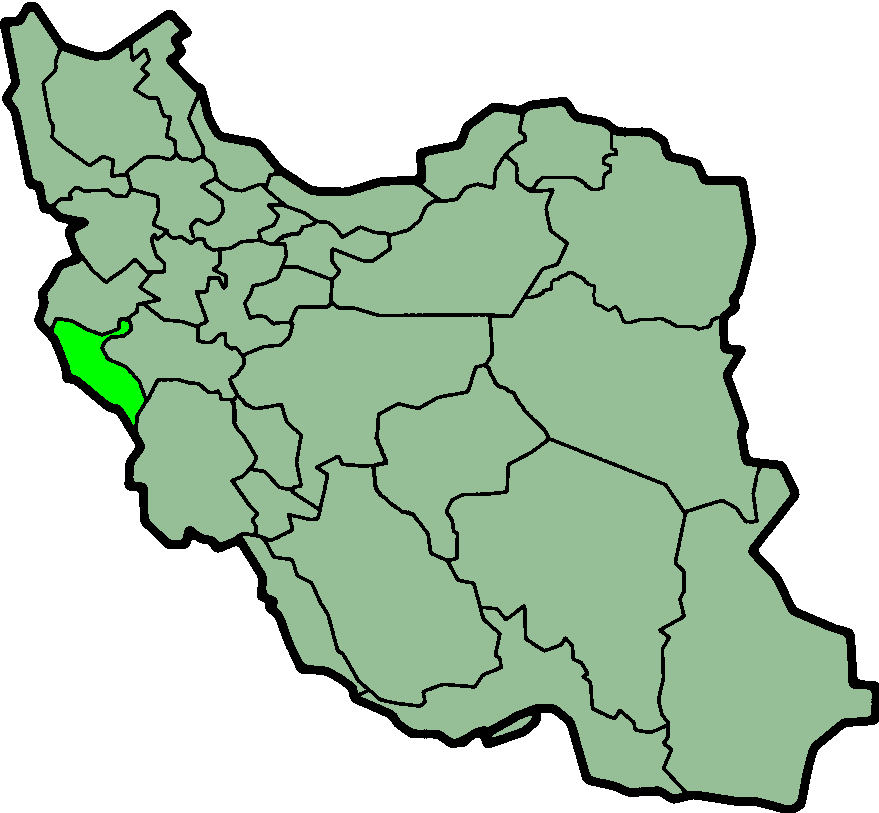
Ilam Province, Iran

Arkavaz (Persian: اركواز) (Note: Also romanized as Arak Vāz, Arakvaz, Arkvāz, Arkwāz, and Erkewaz; also known as Arak Vāz-e Malek Shāhī, Qal‘eh Darreh and Qaleh Darreh-ye Malekshahi (قلعه دره ملکشاهی)) is a city in the Central District of Malekshahi County, Ilam province, Iran, serving as capital of both the county and the district. It is adjacent to the city of Delgosha, bordering it to the north.

== Demographics ==
=== Ethnicity ===
The city is populated by Kurds from the Malekshahi tribe.

=== Population ===
At the time of the 2006 National Census, the city's population was 14,225 in 2,771 households, when it was capital of the former Malekshahi District (Note: Formerly Arkavazi District) of Mehran County. The following census in 2011 counted 12,358 people in 3,116 households, by which time the district had been separated from the county in the establishment of Malekshahi County. Arkavaz was transferred to the new Central District as the county's capital. The 2016 census measured the population of the city as 11,977 people in 3,498 households.
