= Mohsenab Rural District =

Rural district in Ilam province, Iran

Mohsenab Rural District Persian: دهستان محسن آب
- Rural District
- Location within Iran Location within Ilam Province
- Coordinates: 33°06′29″N 46°18′33″E
- Country: Iran
- Province: Ilam
- County: Mehran
- District: Central
- Capital: Shahrak-e Eslamiyeh

Population (2016)
  - Total: 8,738
- Time zone: UTC+3:30 (IRST)

Mohsenab Rural District (Persian: دهستان محسن آب) is in the Central District of Mehran County, Ilam province, Iran. Its capital is the village of Shahrak-e Eslamiyeh.

== Demographics ==
=== Population ===
At the time of the 2006 National Census, the rural district's population was 6,901 in 1,485 households. There were 8,953 inhabitants in 2,266 households at the following census of 2011. The 2016 census measured the population of the rural district as 8,738 in 2,469 households. The most populous of its 52 villages was Shahrak-e Eslamiyeh, with 3,349 people.
