= Shuhan Rural District =

Rural district in Ilam province, Iran

Shuhan Rural District Persian: دهستان شوهان
- Rural District
- Location within Iran Location within Ilam Province
- Coordinates: 33°13′36″N 46°43′00″E
- Country: Iran
- Province: Ilam
- County: Malekshahi
- District: Central
- Capital: Dul Kabud-e Khvoshadul

Population (2016)
  - Total: 675
- Time zone: UTC+3:30 (IRST)

Shuhan Rural District (Persian: دهستان شوهان) is in the Central District of Malekshahi County, Ilam province, Iran. Its capital is the village of Dul Kabud-e Khvoshadul.

== Demographics ==
=== Population ===
At the time of the 2006 National Census, the rural district's population (as a part of the former Malekshahi District (Note: Formerly Arkavazi District) of Mehran County) was 949 in 183 households. There were 829 inhabitants in 194 households at the following census of 2011, by which time the district had been separated from the county in the establishment of Malekshahi County. The rural district was transferred to the new Central District. The 2016 census measured the population of the rural district as 675 in 181 households. The most populous of its 15 villages was Cheshmeh Pahn, with 330 people.
