= Hejdandasht Rural District =

Rural district in Ilam province, Iran

Hejdandasht Rural District Persian: دهستان هجداندشت
- Rural District
- Location within Iran Location within Ilam Province
- Coordinates: 33°26′22″N 46°08′58″E
- Country: Iran
- Province: Ilam
- County: Mehran
- District: Salehabad
- Capital: Rika

Population (2016)
  - Total: 1,778
- Time zone: UTC+3:30 (IRST)

Hejdandasht Rural District (Persian: دهستان هجداندشت) is in Salehabad District of Mehran County, Ilam province, Iran. Its capital is the village of Rika.

== Demographics ==
=== Population ===
At the time of the 2006 National Census, the rural district's population was 1,925 in 396 households. There were 1,648 inhabitants in 407 households at the following census of 2011. The 2016 census measured the population of the rural district as 1,778 in 510 households. The most populous of its 42 villages was Golan, with 986 people.
