= Central District (Mehran County) =

District in Ilam province, Iran

Central District (Mehran County) Persian: بخش مرکزی شهرستان مهران
- District
- Location within Iran Location within Ilam Province
- Coordinates: 33°06′29″N 46°18′33″E
- Country: Iran
- Province: Ilam
- County: Mehran
- Capital: Mehran

Population (2016)
  - Total: 26,173
- Time zone: UTC+3:30 (IRST)

The Central District of Mehran County (Persian: بخش مرکزی شهرستان مهران) is in Ilam province, Iran. Its capital is the city of Mehran.

== Demographics ==
=== Population ===
At the time of the 2006 National Census, the district's population was 20,019 in 4,443 households. The following census in 2011 counted 23,873 people in 6,011 households. The 2016 census measured the population of the district as 26,173 inhabitants in 7,488 households.

=== Administrative divisions ===
Central District (Mehran County) Population
Administrative Divisions	2006	2011	2016
Mohsenab RD	6,901	8,953	8,738
Mehran (city)	13,118	14,920	17,435
Total	20,019	23,873	26,173
RD = Rural District
