= Gachi District =

District in Ilam province, Iran

Gachi District Persian: بخش گچی
- District
- Location within Iran Location within Ilam Province
- Coordinates: 33°22′55″N 46°31′27″E
- Country: Iran
- Province: Ilam
- County: Malekshahi
- Capital: Mehr

Population (2016)
  - Total: 5,609
- Time zone: UTC+3:30 (IRST)

Gachi District (Persian: بخش گچی) is in Malekshahi County, Ilam province, Iran. Its capital is the city of Mehr.

== History ==
In 2008, Malekshahi District (Note: Formerly Arkavazi District) was separated from Mehran County in the establishment of Malekshahi County, which was divided into two districts of two rural districts each, with Arkavaz (Note: Formerly Qaleh Darreh-ye Malekshahi) as its capital. The village of Delgosha was elevated to the status of a city. After the 2011 National Census, the village of Mehr became a city as well.

== Demographics ==
=== Population ===
At the time of the 2011 National Census, the district's population was 6,298 people in 1,561 households. The 2016 census measured the population of the district as 5,609 inhabitants in 1,527 households.

=== Administrative divisions ===
Gachi District Population
Administrative Divisions	2011	2016
Gachi RD	2,011	520
Kabirkuh RD	2,086	2,210
Delgosha (city)	2,201	1,819
Mehr (city)		1,060
Total	6,298	5,609
RD = Rural District
