= Chamzey Rural District =

Rural district in Ilam province, Iran

Chamzey Rural District Persian: دهستان چمزی
- Rural District
- Location within Iran Location within Ilam Province
- Coordinates: 33°16′43″N 46°33′42″E
- Country: Iran
- Province: Ilam
- County: Malekshahi
- District: Central

Population (2016)
  - Total: 2,722
- Time zone: UTC+3:30 (IRST)

Chamzey Rural District (Persian: دهستان چمزی) is in the Central District of Malekshahi County, Ilam province, Iran.

== Demographics ==
=== Population ===
At the time of the 2006 National Census, the rural district's population (as a part of the former Malekshahi District (Note: Formerly Arkavazi District) of Mehran County) was 3,152 in 614 households. There were 2,957 inhabitants in 733 households at the following census of 2011, by which time the district had been separated from the county in the establishment of Malekshahi County. The rural district was transferred to the new Central District, and the 2016 census measured the population of the rural district as 2,722 in 774 households. The most populous of its 14 villages was Gonbad-e Pirmohammad, with 1,573 people.
