= Salehabad District (Mehran County) =

District in Ilam province, Iran

Salehabad District Persian: بخش صالح‌آباد
- District
- Location within Iran Location within Ilam Province
- Coordinates: 33°26′22″N 46°08′58″E
- Country: Iran
- Province: Ilam
- County: Mehran
- Capital: Salehabad

Population (2016)
  - Total: 3,529
- Time zone: UTC+3:30 (IRST)

Salehabad District (Persian: بخش صالح‌آباد) is in Mehran County, Ilam province, Iran. Its capital is the city of Salehabad.

== Demographics ==
=== Population ===
At the time of the 2006 National Census, the district's population was 3,859 in 795 households. The following census in 2011 counted 3,355 people in 814 households. The 2016 census measured the population of the district as 3,529 inhabitants in 957 households.

=== Administrative divisions ===
Salehabad District Population
Administrative Divisions	2006	2011	2016
Hejdandasht RD	1,925	1,648	1,778
Salehabad (city)	1,934	1,707	1,751
Total	3,859	3,355	3,529
RD = Rural District
