= Malekshahi District =

Former district in Ilam province, Iran

Malekshahi District Persian: بخش ملکشاهی
- Former District
- Location within Iran Location within Ilam Province
- Coordinates: 33°18′N 46°35′E
- Country: Iran
- Province: Ilam
- County: Mehran
- Capital: Arkavaz

Population (2006)
  - Total: 31,393
- Time zone: UTC+3:30 (IRST)

Malekshahi District (Persian: بخش ملکشاهی) (Note: Formerly Arkavazi District) is a former administrative division of Mehran County, Ilam province, Iran. Its capital was the city of Arkavaz. (Note: Formerly Qaleh Darreh-ye Malekshahi)

== History ==
After the 2006 National Census, the district was separated from the county in the establishment of Malekshahi County.

== Demographics ==
=== Population ===
At the time of the 2006 census, the district's population was 31,393 in 5,722 households.

=== Administrative divisions ===
Malekshahi District Population
Administrative Divisions	2006
Chamzey RD	3,152
Gachi RD	13,067
Shuhan RD	949
Arkavaz (city)	14,225
Total	31,393
RD = Rural District
