= Gachi Rural District =

Rural district in Ilam province, Iran

Gachi Rural District Persian: دهستان گچی
- Rural District
- Location within Iran Location within Ilam Province
- Coordinates: 33°21′37″N 46°25′57″E
- Country: Iran
- Province: Ilam
- County: Malekshahi
- District: Gachi

Population (2016)
  - Total: 520
- Time zone: UTC+3:30 (IRST)

Gachi Rural District (Persian: دهستان گچی) is in Gachi District of Malekshahi County, Ilam province, Iran.

== Demographics ==
=== Population ===
At the time of the 2006 National Census, the rural district's population (as a part of the former Malekshahi District (Note: Formerly Arkavazi District) of Mehran County) was 13,067 in 2,154 households. There were 2,011 inhabitants in 493 households at the following census of 2011, by which time the district had been separated from the county in the establishment of Malekshahi County. The rural district was transferred to the new Gachi District. The 2016 census measured the population of the rural district as 520 in 140 households. The most populous of its nine villages was Kalak-e Naqi, with 339 people.
