= Central District (Malekshahi County) =

District in Ilam province, Iran

Central District (Malekshahi County) Persian: بخش مرکزی شهرستان ملکشاهی
- District
- Location within Iran Location within Ilam Province
- Coordinates: 33°13′52″N 46°38′04″E
- Country: Iran
- Province: Ilam
- County: Malekshahi
- Capital: Arkavaz

Population (2016)
  - Total: 15,374
- Time zone: UTC+3:30 (IRST)

The Central District of Malekshahi County (Persian: بخش مرکزی شهرستان ملکشاهی) is in Ilam province, Iran. Its capital is the city of Arkavaz. (Note: Formerly Qaleh Darreh-ye Malekshahi)

== History ==
In 2008, Malekshahi District (Note: Formerly Arkavazi District) was separated from Mehran County in the establishment of Malekshahi County, which was divided into two districts of two rural districts each, with Arkavaz as its capital.

== Demographics ==
=== Population ===
At the time of the 2011 National Census, the district's population was 16,144 people in 4,043 households. The 2016 census measured the population of the district as 15,374 inhabitants in 4,453 households.

=== Administrative divisions ===
Central District (Malekshahi County) Population
| Administrative Divisions | 2011 | 2016 |
|---|---|---|
| Chamzey RD | 2,957 | 2,722 |
| Shuhan RD | 829 | 675 |
| Arkavaz (city) | 12,358 | 11,977 |
| Total | 16,144 | 15,374 |
RD = Rural District
