= Mehran County =

County in Ilam Province, Iran

Mehran County Persian: شهرستان مهران
- County
- Location of Mehran County in Ilam province (left, purple)

- Location of Ilam province in Iran
- Coordinates: 33°17′N 46°12′E
- Country: Iran
- Province: Ilam
- Capital: Mehran
- Districts: Central, Salehabad

Population (2016)
  - Total: 29,797
- Time zone: UTC+3:30 (IRST)

Mehran County (Persian: شهرستان مهران) is in Ilam Province, Iran. Its capital is the city of Mehran.

== History ==
After the 2006 National Census, Malekshahi District (Note: Formerly Arkavazi District) was separated from the county in the establishment of Malekshahi County.

== Demographics ==
=== Population ===
At the time of the 2006 National Census, the county's population was 55,271 in 10,960 households. The following census in 2011 counted 27,506 people in 6,884 households. The 2016 census measured the population of the county as 29,797 in 8,471 households.

=== Administrative divisions ===
Mehran County's population history and administrative structure over three consecutive censuses are shown in the following table.

Mehran County Population
Administrative Divisions	2006	2011	2016
Central District	20,019	23,873	26,173
Mohsenab RD	6,901	8,953	8,738
Mehran (city)	13,118	14,920	17,435
Malekshahi District (Note: Transferred to Malekshahi County)	31,393		
Chamzey RD	3,152		
Gachi RD	13,067		
Shuhan RD	949		
Arkavaz (city) (Note: Formerly Qaleh Darreh-ye Malekshahi)	14,225		
Salehabad District	3,859	3,355	3,529
Hejdandasht RD	1,925	1,648	1,778
Salehabad (city)	1,934	1,707	1,751
Total	55,271	27,506	29,797
RD = Rural District

== See also ==
Media related to Mehran County at Wikimedia Commons
