= Malekshahi County =

County in Ilam Province, Iran

Malekshahi County Persian: شهرستان ملکشاهی
- County
- Location of Malekshahi County in Ilam province (center, pink)

- Location of Ilam Province in Iran
- Coordinates: 33°18′N 46°35′E
- Country: Iran
- Province: Ilam
- Capital: Arkavaz
- Districts: Central, Gachi

Population (2016)
  - Total: 21,138
- Time zone: UTC+3:30 (IRST)

Malekshahi County (Persian: شهرستان ملکشاهی) (Note: The name in Persian (ملگشاهی) is from the old name, Melkishi, a Kurdish tribe spread from Ilam to Ardahan province in Turkey. There is a Georgian counterpart to this tribe, namely the Melikishvili. The Malekshahi form one of the largest tribes in Iran, Iraq and Turkey. Melikshahi Kurdish language and dialect is Malekshahi.) is in Ilam province, Iran. Its capital is the city of Arkavaz. (Note: Formerly Qaleh Darreh-ye Malekshahi) The Malekshahi tribe is the largest Kurdish tribe in Ilam.

== History ==
In 2008, Malekshahi District (Note: Formerly Arkavazi District) was separated from Mehran County in the establishment of Malekshahi County, which was divided into two districts of two rural districts each, with Arkavaz as its capital. The village of Delgosha was elevated to the status of a city. After the 2011 National Census, the village of Mehr became a city as well.

=== During the 2025-2026 Iranian protests ===
On January 3, 2026, during the 2025-2026 Iranian protests and 2026 Iran massacres, forces of the Islamic Revolutionary Guard Corps (IRGC) and Basij opened fire on protesting civilians, killing several in the Malekshahi County.

Among those killed was Latif Karimi. His son confirmed on his personal social media page that Karimi was killed directly by government forces. Following the incident, state-affiliated institutions promoted media narratives describing him as a member of government forces who had been killed by protesters.

== Demographics ==
=== Population ===
At the time of the 2011 census, the county's population was 22,587 people in 5,626 households. The 2016 census measured the population of the county as 21,138 in 6,022 households.

=== Administrative divisions ===
Malekshahi County's population history and administrative structure over two consecutive censuses are shown in the following table.

Malekshahi County Population
Administrative Divisions	2011	2016
Central District	16,144	15,374
Chamzey RD	2,957	2,722
Shuhan RD	829	675
Arkavaz (city)	12,358	11,977
Gachi District	6,298	5,609
Gachi RD	2,011	520
Kabirkuh RD	2,086	2,210
Delgosha (city)	2,201	1,819
Mehr (city)		1,060
Total	22,587	21,138
RD = Rural District

== 2026 Malekshahi massacre ==
The 2026 Malekshahi massacre was committed by the forces of the Islamic Revolutionary Guard Corps (IRGC) and Basij on 3 January 2026 in Malekshahi County, Ilam province, Iran. The massacre began at noon when the IRGC and Basij forces opened fire on protesting civilians, killing several.

== See also ==
Media related to Malekshahi County at Wikimedia Commons
